= Atlantic theater aircraft carrier operations during World War II =

World War II was the first war where naval aviation took a major part in the hostilities. Aircraft carriers were used from the start of the war in Europe looking for German merchant raiders and escorting convoys. Offensive operations began with the Norwegian campaign where British carriers supported the fighting on land.

Carriers were important to the Mediterranean and Middle East theatre where they were used to resupply Malta's aircraft and so keep it viable in preventing resupply of Axis forces in North Africa.

Later in the war small escort carriers built on civilian cargo hulls took over convoy protection.

Naval historians such as Evan Mawdsley, Richard Overy, and Craig Symonds concluded that World War II's decisive victories on land could not have been won without decisive victories at sea. Naval battles to keep shipping lanes open for combatant's movement of troops, guns, ammunition, tanks, warships, aircraft, raw materials, and food largely determined the outcome of land battles. Without the Allied victory in keeping shipping lanes open during the Battle of the Atlantic, Britain could not have fed her people or withstood Axis offensives in Europe and North Africa. Without Britain's survival and without Allied shipments of food, materiel and industrial equipment to the Soviet Union, (Note: Britain and America shipped materiel and foodstuffs to the Soviet Union via Arctic convoys, the Persian Corridor (Iran), the Pacific Route (Vladivostok) and the Alaska-Siberia Air Route) her military and economic power would likely not have rebounded in time for Russian soldiers to prevail at Stalingrad and Kursk.

Allied operations in the Atlantic and Pacific war theaters were interconnected because they frequently competed for scarce naval resources for everything from aircraft carriers to transports and landing craft. Effective transport of troops and military supplies between the two war theaters required naval protection for shipping routes around the Cape of Good Hope, through the Suez canal, and through the Panama Canal. In both theaters, maritime dominance enabled combatants to use the sea for their own purposes and deprive its use by adversaries. As naval historian Admiral Herbert Richmond stated, "Sea power did not win the war itself: it enabled the war to be won".

Aircraft carriers played a major role in winning decisive naval battles, supporting key amphibious landings, and keeping critical merchant shipping lanes open for transporting military personnel and their equipment to land battle zones.

== Atlantic war overview (1939-1945) ==
During the 1930s, Germany began rebuilding her military from its dissolution following World War I. She initially achieved annexations short of war by unopposed initiatives in Alsace-Lorraine, Austria, and Czechoslovakia. Germany launched the war in Europe with the invasion of Poland prompting war with Britain and France and the naval blockade of Germany. In 1940 Germany invaded Denmark and Norway, and then the Netherlands, Belgium, and France. Italy joined what she perceived would be a short war in order for her to benefit from the spoils. Although Britain was not invaded or subjugated by Germany's intensive bombing campaign, Britain's survival was threatened by an Axis blockade using submarines, warship raiders, and land-based aircraft that undermined her means to continue resisting. In North Africa Italy attempted an invasion of Egypt but was beaten back drawing Germany into the conflict there.

Germany boldly attacked the Soviet Union, initially with considerable success. Stiff resistance and the onset of bitter winter weather prevented a quick German victory, leading to protracted war on Germany's Eastern Front.

Prior to Japan's attack on Pearl Harbor that resulted in the United States formally entering the war in both the Pacific and Atlantic theaters, support for the war had been mixed with some noted industrialists (such as the Ford Motor company) providing material support to the Axis, while other elements supported the Allies. The attack on Pearl Harbor galvanized national support for the Allied nations and spurred the entrance of the United States into the war on the side of the Allies in both the Pacific and Atlantic theaters. Within a year, led by Soviet victory at Stalingrad, the British victory at the Second Battle of El Alamein, and the American stand at Guadalcanal, the tide of war began to turn against the Axis. Allied protection of convoys improved, permitting significant transportation of troops, equipment, and food to European war zones. The Allies moved toward Germany from the west by invading North Africa, then Italy, and then France. From the east, in the world's largest land battles, Russia confronted and drove back what was the bulk of Germany's huge army, ultimately overrunning Berlin. Germany surrendered.

== Carriers in the Atlantic theater (1939-1945) ==
From 1918, British naval aviation was within the Royal Air Force. The development of naval aircraft for the Fleet Air Arm was neglected as part of general limitations on military spending, and Britain's previous lead in naval air capability was lost. Naval aviation was returned to the control of the Admiralty in mid-1939. Coastal patrol remained with RAF. When war broke out in Europe in 1939, the Royal Navy had only about 400 aircraft compared to the US Navy with over 2,000. In the years leading up to the war, the majority of investment in UK was in building up the defensive fighter force. Throughout the war, British naval air competed with RAF Bomber Command for resources, and the strategic bombing campaign against Germany with long-range, land-based bombers typically had priority.

In 1939, the British navy had strong bases at both ends of the Mediterranean Sea, one at Alexandria, Egypt, and another at Gibraltar and a strong position in the central Mediterranean with Malta. The French Navy had strong naval bases at Toulon southern France and Mers-el-Kébir French Algeria from which it could exert great influence in Western Mediterranean. Located in the central Mediterranean and with land projecting well into the center of what they considered "mare nostrum" ("our sea"), the Italians relied upon surface vessels and land-based aircraft to dominate the Central Mediterranean. They did not perceive that they needed aircraft carriers.

As part of the largest fleet in the world, Britain had seven aircraft carriers at the time of the declaration of war with Germany on 3 September 1939. (Note: Argus, Hermes, Eagle, Furious, Courageous, Glorious, and Ark Royal. Hermes was in use as an accommodation ship when the war began but immediately became operational thereafter.) and another five (of six planned) under construction. These carriers soon proved vulnerable to submarines, battleships, and land-based aircraft. Carriers had played no material role in World War I, and there were no battle-tested policies or procedures on how to use or protect them. Losses during their initial operations would provide sobering learning experiences. These losses resulted from questionable command decisions coupled with task assignments for which the carriers were not well suited or adequately protected.

Two weeks after the war began HMS Courageous was on an anti-submarine patrol with only a small screening force. It was sunk by the German submarine U-29 off the coast of Ireland. HMS Ark Royal might well have been sunk the same week by U-39 if the U-boat's torpedoes had not been spotted Thereafter, such carriers were regarded by the Admiralty as too vulnerable to be used for anti-submarine patrols. Eight months later, HMS Glorious was evacuating aircraft during the British withdrawal from Norway. Travelling independently it was discovered by two German battleships. (Note: The Scharnhorst and the Gneisenau) With only two destroyers, aircraft landed and her own 4-inch guns to protect herself, she was sunk by the battleships' shellfire; the first aircraft carrier to be sunk by gunfire. Her commander had not launched bombers to protect her from such warships, perhaps in part because of inability to sustain an effective launch and recovery cycle with her decks crowded with fighters recovered from Norway airfields that she was transporting back to Britain. Even if aircraft had been deployed, however, the outcome may have been the same. British torpedoes, like those used by Germany and America at the time, were defective and often detonated prematurely or did not detonate at all. Similarly, British anti-submarine bombs aboard Glorious at the time had almost no destructive power

At the beginning of 1942, the USN Atlantic Fleet had, in Carrier Division 3, the three fleet carriers Ranger, Hornet, and Wasp and the escort carrier Long Island.

Over the course of the war, Allied carriers became increasingly effective. Aircraft from British and American carriers in the Atlantic Theater were used for both offensive and defensive operations. These included providing air cover during invasions; raiding enemy installations; blockading ports; patrolling for and attacking submarines, raiders, and land-based aircraft; protecting trade routes and convoys; and transporting aircraft, troops, and supplies for military and civilian use. As America's shipbuilding capability was mobilized, large numbers of carriers became available to perform these tasks.

Carrier operations in the Pacific Theater tend to receive more attention from historians than those in the Atlantic Theater. The major, tide-turning naval battles between carrier fleets were fought in the Pacific while decisive, turning points in the Atlantic Theater were land battles, specifically at Stalingrad and El Alamein. Historian Evan Mawdsley contends that the war for the Atlantic was considerably more important for the Allies than the war in the Pacific. Accordingly, the relatively unsung contributions of carriers in the Atlantic, which made these victories possible, may warrant more appreciation.

== Commanders, organizations, and strategies (1939 - 1945) ==
Unlike in the Pacific Theater, where naval commanders exerted the principal influence on operations, war in the Atlantic Theater was closely directed by the heads of government, namely Adolf Hitler, Winston Churchill, Joseph Stalin, and Franklin Roosevelt. The first three frequently involved themselves in operational details, while Roosevelt was more inclined to leave such details to his military commanders.

In Germany, Hitler assumed multiple political and military roles. He unilaterally developed strategic military initiatives and exercised increasingly greater control over operational details, including movement of troops, units to be involved and commanders to be in charge. Insisting he knew more than his generals, he disregarded and humiliated his professional military planners and commanders, relying instead upon himself and political allies such as Heinrich Himmler and Hermann Göring. For the Navy, Hitler vacillated between emphasis upon building capital ships to rival Britain on the oceans' surfaces and upon building submarines with which to strangle Britain from below. One of Germany's principal strategies during the war was to blockade Britain, forcing her to capitulate for lack of food and military supplies. On the surface, warship raiders such as the pocket battleship Admiral Scheer and merchant raiders such as the Atlantis had some limited success. But it was German submarines that almost succeeded in bringing Britain to her knees. Emphasis on submarine production and "wolfpack" tactics to cripple Britain were the focus of the Supreme Commander of the German Navy Admiral Donitz. In addition to seeking to blockade sea lanes to Britain, his submarines were also used to prevent blockades of sea lanes needed to transport iron ore to Germany from Scandinavia and to transport critical supplies across the Mediterranean to German forces in North Africa.

In Britain, Churchill also exercised considerable control for the overview and details regarding the course of the war. Unlike Hitler, however, he did respect and take advice from his military advisors. He also had to negotiate with American political and military leaders, whom he wanted to enter the war (Note: Churchill's plan for beating the German's was reportedly to "drag the United States in." (See Larson, "The Splendid and the Vile", p. 25)) and who ultimately commanded more troops and controlled more resources than Britain could bring to bear. Before becoming prime minister, Churchill had served as Britain's First Lord of the Admiralty both during World War I and the opening months of World War II. He was fully aware of the danger that German surface raiders and submarines represented to Britain's survival. He ultimately convinced the Americans to approach Germany by invading North Africa and Italy before invading Normandy. He was unsuccessful later in the war in convincing the Americans to push toward Germany through the Balkans instead of southern France.

Admiral Bertram Ramsay oversaw the evacuation from Dunkirk and had command roles for naval forces during the invasions of North Africa, Sicily, and Normandy. Admiral James Somerville commanded Force H in the Mediterranean and later the Far East Fleet. Admiral John Cunningham was Commander-in-Chief Mediterranean Fleet. Eisenhower and Cunningham planned and executed operation Torch.

In Russia, Stalin remained suspicious of his generals, as he had been when he executed tens of thousands of experienced military officers during his purges of the late 1930s. He was, however, more like Churchill and less like Hitler and inclined to listen to the advice from military professionals even if he issued contrary orders. Russian naval activities during the war were mostly defensive, protecting shore installations and convoys.

In America, Roosevelt typically relied on his military advisors. As the war progressed, Chief of Staff Admiral Leahy and General of the Army General Marshall had direct access to Roosevelt and came to have strong influence if not almost complete control over military matters in Europe. Harry Hopkins, Roosevelt's closest advisor, also had strong influence. Virtually all the important American decisions of the war were made by Roosevelt, Hopkins, and the Joint Chiefs of Staff. Roosevelt was instrumental in strengthening the US Navy by building a two-ocean navy and in passing the Lend-Lease Act to support Britain. He agreed with Churchill on the "Germany First" strategy. Also like Churchill, his naval priority for the Atlantic Theater was to keep sea lanes open to support Britain and to get US troops and equipment to Britain, North Africa and Continental Europe.

== Battle of the Atlantic (1939-1945) ==
The Battle of the Atlantic was the longest continuously running battle of World War II in the Atlantic theater. It was principally a strategic contest between the Allies and Axis powers to deny each other the use of oceanic shipping for transporting troops and vital supplies. Britain and America sought to blockade ports to prevent raw materials and other supplies from reaching Germany from Norway by sea. Similarly, Germany and Italy sought to prevent supplies principally from the Americas from reaching Britain and USSR. Without those supplies, Britain could not have continued to fight in the West, and Russia may not have been able to ultimately defeat German forces in the East. Germany and Italy used submarines, merchant raiders, battle cruisers, and land-based aircraft to sink Allied transport ships. German submarines were by far the most effective tools for sinking Allied shipping, accounting for 70% of worldwide Allied merchant shipping losses. According to naval historian Samuel Eliot Morison, the submarine was the single greatest threat to Allied victory over the Axis nations. Winston Churchill wrote that "the only thing that ever really frightened me during the war was the U-boat peril."

The Allies' use of aircraft carriers contributed significantly to the ultimate success of the Battle of the Atlantic. Carrier-launched aircraft both protected Allied shipping, especially against submarines, and attacked Axis shipping. These aircraft, along with long-range, land-based aircraft, were increasingly used by the Allies during the war both for close protection of convoy transports and for independent anti-submarine and anti-raider patrols. After capturing and deciphering German code machines, the Allies were able to intercept and decrypt transmissions between the German submarines and their naval headquarters. This gave the Allies advance warning of the submarines' locations, enabling convoys to be redirected around submarine concentrations. Further, knowing submarine locations increased carriers' effectiveness while patrolling against attack submarines and their submarine re-supply ships.

=== Early German successes (1939-1941) ===
In September 1939, Germany had 57 submarines, although only 22 were the Type VII suitable for operations in the Atlantic. (Note: The 626 ton Type VII and the 1,032 ton Type IX.) Only eight or nine of these could be on station at any one time because of the time needed to travel to and from their bases and to replenish their supplies. Nonetheless, by March 1940 this relatively small number of submarines had sunk 222 Allied ships, including an aircraft carrier, a battleship, and two destroyers.

With the sinking of the passenger liner Athenia the day the war started in September 1939, it became apparent to the British that a defense against German submarines and commerce raiders had to be mounted. The initial, fateful response was to send the fleet carrier HMS Courageous on an anti-submarine patrol, culminating in her being sunk by a submarine rather than the other way around. Light carrier HMS Hermes and fleet carrier HMS Ark Royal formed the centers around which other anti-submarine groups were assembled to patrol Britain's Western Approaches. Although aircraft carriers were included in patrols to locate submarines in 1939, there were no reliably effective air-launched anti-submarine weapons. The only effective aircraft-launched anti-submarine weapons at the time were torpedoes with magnetic pistol detonators that sometimes exploded prematurely or not at all. Only later were improved torpedo detonators and depth charges suitable for aircraft use developed.

In October 1939, eight "hunting groups" consisting of British and French aircraft carriers and cruisers were ordered to the Atlantic to hunt for German pocket-battleship raiders. HMS Ark Royal was sent to the waters off Sierra Leone in West Africa as part of newly formed Force K to assist with providing protection for Allied merchant ships and to sink German ships. Aircraft from the carrier located a German cargo ship, (Note: SS Uhenfels) which Force K captured.

Two weeks after the Germans invaded Norway in April 1940, British troops made amphibious landings there with air cover provided by squadrons from HMS Glorious and HMS Ark Royal. Glorious and Furious ferried aircraft over intended for use from captured airports. The British attempt to establish a position in Norway was not successful, and HMS Glorious was sunk by German battleship fire as she was transporting evacuated aircraft back to Britain.

The situation worsened for Britain following the Fall of France in June 1940. Germany became able to base U-boat operations on the French coast, bringing U-boats 1,000 miles nearer to Allied convoy routes. In addition, the French fleet came under control of the German puppet regime at Vichy. As a result, the French fleet was no longer available to the Allies for combating the U-boat threat in the Atlantic or the Mediterranean. Also, Italy joined the war the same month France fell and, with its strong navy, threatened British convoys in the Atlantic and Mediterranean with surface warships, submarines, and land-based aircraft. Finally, Germany had broken Britain's naval code, giving them great intelligence about convoy movements that lasted until August 1940. Again in May 1943, a British change of ciphers "at last defeated the highly skilled German cryptographers."

In December 1940 while en route to Takoradi, Ghana, ferrying aircraft to fly to reinforce the Middle East, the convoy including HMS Argus and HMS Furious were threatened by a German raider, the cruiser Admiral Hipper. Carrier aircraft was mostly crated and the carriers initially unready for offensive action. The raider withdrew rather than engage with the escorting destroyers. By the time carrier aircraft was ready to attack, the raider could not be located.

By April 1941, Germany's monthly U-boat production was enough for Admiral Dönitz to begin employing submarines in groups of eight to 20 at a time using wolfpack tactics. Early that month, a wolfpack sank ten of the 22 ships in convoy SC 26 sailing from Halifax to Liverpool. Although not yet technically in the war, America transferred the new fleet carrier USS Yorktown, three battleships, and six other warships from the Pacific to the Atlantic Theater to assist with escorting convoys. Nonetheless, the shortage of suitable convoy escorts constituted a great handicap for the Allies. U-boat successes during this period led the German submariners to refer it as the "happy time".

Despite the threats from enemy submarines and land-based bombers, British carriers ferried troops and aircraft to the Mediterranean throughout 1941. In April, HMS Furious ferried aircraft to Gibraltar for transfer to HMS Ark Royal which, in turn, launched them for Malta. Both carriers made additional fores into the Mediterranean during May and June. After Germany attacked Russia in June, Furious accompanied convoys there, making an unsuccessful raid on Petsamo, Finland as HMS Victorious raided Kirkenes, Norway. Furious then resumed ferrying aircraft to Malta, again with Ark Royal.

America had helped strengthen British convoy protection capability beginning in September 1940 by transferring 50 destroyers to the Royal Navy under the Destroyers for Bases Agreement. In addition, American warships began escorting Britain-bound convoys from North America as far as waters south of Iceland. Nonetheless, by December 1941 when America came into the war, U-boats had hit about 1,200 ships raising serious concerns about the sustainability of adequately supplying the United Kingdom with food, raw materials, and military supplies.

After June 1941, when Germany launched its attack against Russia, Britain began convoying goods to Archangel and Murmansk across the Arctic Ocean. The first carried munitions and crated aircraft and was escorted by the carrier HMS Argus with its two dozen Hurricane fighters. HMS Victorious helped provide cover for ten of the 78 convoys that were completed between then and 1945, many of which were subjected to intense German bombing and U-boat attacks. The worst losses occurred with the joint British/American convoy PQ 17 to Murmansk of September 1942. It lost 23 of its 35 merchant ships due to attacks by German aircraft and submarines after close supporting convoy escort vessels were withdrawn. The main covering force, which included HMS Victorious, was too far away to help.

=== Neutrality patrols (1939-1941) ===
When war broke out in Europe September 1939, the United States declared its neutrality and established a Neutrality Zone in the Atlantic in which it would protect shipping. Fleet carrier USS Ranger began conducting Neutrality Patrols to monitor movement and activities of the belligerents. Based in Bermuda, she patrolled the eastern seaboard from the middle Atlantic to Argentia, Newfoundland. Such patrols evolved into escort duties, and by early 1941, American warships joined those from Britain and Canada, sharing responsibility for safe passage of convoys destined for the United Kingdom. Germany was warned that her warships entering the zone would be attacked if they threatened ships under American escort protection. In September, fleet carrier USS Wasp participated in the neutrality patrols. In October, destroyers providing convoy escort and screening the USS Yorktown dropped depth charges on a suspected U-boat position. American destroyers escorting another convoy engaged German U-boats and two US destroyers were torpedoed, one sinking. (Note: USS Kearny and USS Ruben James.)

=== Sinking the Bismarck (1941) ===
In late May 1941, the German battleship Bismarck, accompanied by the heavy cruiser Prinz Eugen, attempted to break out into the Atlantic with the principal objective of destroying British merchant shipping. She sustained damage but successfully fought off an initial British attempt to stop her at the Battle of the Denmark Strait east of Iceland. In this engagement, Bismarck sank the battlecruiser HMS Hood but was damaged and turned for safety in France. Aircraft from the newly commissioned carrier HMS Victorious torpedoed the Bismarck to little effect.

Warships from Force H in the Mediterranean, including Ark Royal, joined Home Fleet warships in pursuit. The weather was foul with winds up to fifty-six knots, making carrier take-offs and landings extremely hazardous. Nonetheless, Fairey Swordfish torpedo bombers from Ark Royal shadowed the Bismarck as it sailed for the German base at Brest on the French coast seeking the protection of land-based air cover it would have if it were able to out-race the pursuing warships. The Bismarck appeared likely to win that race unless Ark Royal aircraft could prevent it. Weathering gale-force winds, rain, and intensive anti-aircraft fire, 15 Swordfish attacked with torpedoes. At least two torpedoes hit. One of them, by luck, damaged Bismarck's steering gear resulting in her being unable to hold her course and speed. Aircraft continued to shadow the battleship as British warships overtook her and engaged her in battle, the battleships inflicted such damage that Bismarck's captain ordered Bismarck to be scuttled. During the battle, Ark Royal was attacked by land-based German aircraft but was effectively protected by escorting cruisers.

In August 1939, anticipating war breaking out soon, the Kriegsmarine prepositioned two pocket battleships in the Atlantic also to act as surface raiders on British merchant shipping. The Deutschland hunted in the North Atlantic and sank only two ships before being recalled in November. The Graf Spee, was more successful in the South Atlantic, but was sunk during the Battle of the River Plate in December 1939. The most successful of the German warship raiders was the Admiral Scheer, which sank 17 ships between October 1940 and April 1941. However, Hitler did not believe merchant raiding justified the commitment of his capital ships and was infuriated at the loss of the Bismarck. The German raider threat in the Atlantic Theater, except for in the Arctic, effectively ended with the sinking of the Bismarck.

=== Escort carrier (CVE) development (1940-1944) ===
Early in the War, large areas in the Atlantic could not be covered by land-based aircraft from Canada, Iceland, and Britain. Britain did not have enough fleet or light carriers to provide sufficient protection for convoys in those gaps. She took several measures to enhance convoy protection in those ocean areas by adding aircraft launching capabilities to convoy escort ships, including some ships that, at the same time, were transporting food, oil, grain, and other vital supplies.

First, in 1940–1941, Britain converted three ocean boarding vessels, an aircraft transport and training ship, and a former cargo ship to Fighter catapult ships (FAC). Each such ship had a single aircraft, a Fairey Fulmar, a long range naval fighter that could be launched using a catapult. Three of these five ships were sunk in 1941. Beginning in 1941, Britain converted 35 cargo or transport ships to catapult aircraft merchant ships (CAM ships). Like the fighter catapult ships, the CAM ships carried only one, catapult-launched aircraft. While in service in 1941 and 1942, the CAMs provided valuable service, making nine combat launches while with convoys in the North Atlantic and Arctic oceans and downing nine German aircraft. There was no provision for recovering aircraft by the ship that launched them. After completing their attack, the fighters either flew to land or were ditched and their pilots recovered by other ships. As adequate numbers of escort carriers became available to protect convoys in mid-1943, FAC and CAM ships were judged to be too vulnerable to German raiders and U-boats and were retired from service.

Between April 1943 and April 1944, the British converted 19 commercial grain transports and oil tankers to Merchant aircraft carriers (MAC ships) by adding a flight deck to the top while retaining their cargo capacity. They typically carried three or four Fairey Swordfish torpedo bombers for anti-submarine operations. Converted oil tankers did not have hangars or lifts, and aircraft were stored on the flight deck. Although these carriers, like their predecessors, were intended to be stop gap measures until enough escort carriers became available, MACs proved effective and all but four of them continued in service until the end of the European war. (Note: MV ‘’Rapana’’, MV ‘’Amastra’’, MV ‘Ancylus’’, MV ‘’Acavus’’ were retired from service in October 1944.)

In January 1941, Britain began rebuilding a captured German merchant ship into what was to become Britain's first escort carrier, HMS Audacity, for protecting shipping against U-boat attacks. She carried six operational aircraft and could store another eight. There was no hangar deck or lift, and aircraft were stored on deck. Shortly thereafter, in April 1941, the Americans began converting Type C3 merchant hulls to escort carriers. To get CVEs operational as soon as possible, President Roosevelt insisted upon conversions taking no more than three months. In this he was supported by Admirals William Halsey Jr. and Husband E. Kimmel. The first American-built CVE was the USS Long Island (commissioned in June 1941) and capable of operating 21 aircraft. The following November, the second American-built CVE, capable of operating 15 aircraft, was transferred to the Royal Navy and entered service as HMS Archer.

Charger/Avenger-Class CVEs. Four more such carriers were constructed in American shipyards of which three were immediately transferred to Britain under the Lend-Lease Act. Carrier names along with the number of operational aircraft carried were HMS Avenger (15), HMS Biter (15-21), HMS Dasher (15), and USS Charger (30). These carriers were referred to as the Avenger class by the British and as the Charger-class by the Americans.

Bogue/Attacker-Class CVEs. Experience with the USS Long Island led to design improvements for the forty-five C-3 hull conversions that made up the Bogue class escort carriers. Forty-five Bogue class carriers capable of operating 19-24 aircraft were launched in America between 1942 and 1943 of which 33 went to Britain, where they were referred to as Attacker-class.

Sangamon-Class CVEs. At the same time C-3 merchant ships were being converted to CVEs, the same was being done with four American fast fleet T-3 mercantile tanker hulls that became the Sangamon-class. These ex-oilers had longer flight decks, greater range, were faster, more stable, carried 25-32 aircraft, and carried more fuel than the Bogue-Class ships. These improvements made them the choice for escorting troops across the Atlantic for the invasion of North Africa (Operation Torch) and their completion was expedited. Their extra fuel capacity also proved useful in the Pacific. After providing close combat support and combat air patrols for the invasion of the Gilbert Islands (Operation Galvanic), three Sagamon carriers still had enough fuel between them to refuel 45 destroyers and two cruisers. More such CVEs might have been constructed, but the critical need for more oilers prevented the conversion of additional mercantile tankers to warships.

Casablanca/Kaiser-Class CVEs. The critical need for protecting convoys led to mass production in Kaiser's American shipyards of Casablanca-class CVEs. These carriers carried 28 operational aircraft. Although the design incorporated some improvements, ships of the class were generally considered good enough but just barely. Nonetheless, fifty were commissioned between 1942 and 1944.

Nairana-Class CVEs. Britain converted three merchant ships to CVEs, one each in England, Scotland, and Northern Ireland. They came into use during 1944 and carried 15 to 20 aircraft.

Commencement Bay-Class CVEs. Everything that had been learned from earlier designs was taken into consideration for the Commencement Bay-class. They were fast and carried 34 operational aircraft. Nineteen of these carriers were commissioned beginning in November 1944 but only a few saw combat during the war.

Details for CVE design is included in the article, Design and capability of aircraft carriers during World War II

The greatest initial need for escort carriers, as with FACs, CAMs, and MACs, was to protect merchant shipping in convoys. Transport aircraft to war zones became a critical function after America entered the war. Additional combat roles were also envisioned for them. Britain's intended deployment for CVEs was 24 for convoy escort, 11 for assault operations, seven for ferrying aircraft, and two for training. Early on, CVEs proved valuable for raiding ports and supporting amphibious landings.

As they became more plentiful, UK and America began using escort carriers, together with corvettes, frigates, destroyers or destroyer escorts, for independent anti-submarine patrols forming Hunter-killer Groups. American escort carriers USS Bogue, USS Card, USS Core, and USS Croatan, guided to locations for German submarines with intercepted and decoded German Navy transmissions, were highly successful as “hunter-killer” warships.

=== Types of carrier functions (1939-1945) ===
Aircraft carriers successfully completed a variety of functions during the war, both in the Atlantic and the Pacific theaters. All of these functions were, at one time or another, accomplished by fleet, light, and escort carriers. Functions performed by carriers in the Atlantic Theater are listed below.

Support amphibious landings. Carrier-launched aircraft provided air cover at amphibious landings for such operations as Operation Torch in French North Africa, Operation Avalanche in Italy, and Operation Dragoon in Southern France.

Raid enemy ports. Carrier-launched aircraft damaged warships, transports, and port facilities at Mers-el-Kébir in French Algeria, Taranto in Italy, and at Bodø in Norway.

Patrol for and attack submarines and raiders. Early in the war, fleet carriers and light carriers were used for anti-submarine and anti-raider patrols. British carriers HMS Hermes, HMS Courageous, and HMS Ark Royal patrolled Britain's Western approaches. In September 1941, before America was officially in the war and shortly after a U-boat fired upon the destroyer USS Greer, the fleet carrier USS Wasp sailed to Iceland with orders to find and destroy German or Italian warships. Accompanied by a cruiser and four destroyers during November 1941, Wasp patrolled around Newfoundland and on her subsequent trip to Norfolk in October, the month the destroyer USS Kearny and oiler USS Salinas were torpedoed and the destroyer USS Reuben James was torpedoed and sunk. Wasp conducted further patrols out of Bermuda. By mid-1943, some American CVEs began operating independently of convoys and formed hunter-killer groups along with destroyers and destroyer escorts to search for and destroy U-boats. During October 1943, USS Ranger patrolled the waters between Britain and Iceland.

Escort convoys. To improve protection from raider and U-boat attacks, thousands of merchant ships traveled in thousands of convoys protected by thousands of escorts. British naval escorts alone completed 13,200 separate trans-Atlantic voyages to protect merchant ships. Raiders were reluctant to engage convoy escorts. Britain and America favored different approaches for using escort carriers in anti-submarine warfare. The British typically kept their CVEs close to convoys since protection of the merchant ships was their priority, not sinking submarines. In addition, it was reasoned that, if the objective was to find U-boats to sink, they could well be expected to come to the convoys. CVE operations were closely controlled centrally to optimize convoy escort efforts. Convoys were routed around known submarine concentrations and additional escorts were sent to strengthen threatened convoys. The Americans, on the other hand, believed a complementary effort by independent CVEs to search out and destroy U-boats and their supply ships would also be effective. Disrupting refueling operation and sinking supply ships such as "milk cow" submarines reduced the patrol time for attack submarines to find and sink ships before having to return to their bases. American CVEs, led by officers with naval aviation experience, formed the center of escort carrier hunter-killer groups that moved independently of convoys and independently of centralized control. They acted upon highly accurate intelligence about enemy submarines positions because the Allies were intercepting and decoding Axis naval transmissions. Both the British and American approaches for using CVEs proved highly successful for sinking U-boats.

Ferry aircraft, troops, and supplies. Immediately after the German invasion of Norway in April 1940, the United Kingdom and France landed forces there to expel them. British carriers transported fighter aircraft to provide air cover. Britain invaded and occupied Iceland in May 1940 to prevent Germany from doing so. In August 1941, American forces assumed responsibility for Iceland's occupation and defense. USS Wasp transported the troops to Iceland along with P-40C Warhawk fighter aircraft to protect the American troop landings. Between April and July 1942, USS Ranger transported aircraft to the Gold Cost in Africa that ultimately reached the American Flying Tigers fighting in China. In April 1943, CVE USS Chenango transported P-40 Warhawk fighters to North Africa in ongoing support of Allied landings there. In April 1944, USS Ranger transported P-38 Lightning fighters and personnel to Casablanca and returned to New York with aircraft needing repair. The fleet carrier USS Wasp could carry up to 100 aircraft and, from her flight decks, with 11 of her own Wildcat fighters on patrol overhead, 47 Spitfire fighters took off for Malta in April 1942. The escort carrier USS Liscome Bay could operate 27 aircraft when on patrol or providing close combat support but, when the decks were packed, she could ferry about 45 aircraft to wherever they were needed.

Train carrier pilots. Some carriers were mostly dedicated to pilot training and carrier trials. The escort carrier USS Charger spent most of the war in the Chesapeake Bay with this focus, although she did ferry aircraft to Bermuda in October 1942 in support of Operation Torch. USS Ranger operated out of Rhode Island waters as a training carrier between January and April 1944. After a brief assignment transporting aircraft, she was transferred to the Pacific for training pilots out of California and Hawaii. After October 1944, HMS Furious was also deployed principally for trials and training.

=== Mid-War U-boat successes (1942-1943) ===
Many advances in anti-submarine warfare had been made by 1942. However, as with Britain, America endured a costly learning period as she became fully engaged. The US was slow to adopt the convoy system in its own waters and slow to begin controlling lighting at coastal cities that effectively outlined target shipping for U-boat commanders. Destroyer USS Jacob Jones was sent out on patrol to sink submarines off the Delaware Capes in February 1942 and was instead sunk by U-578, reminiscent of Britain's sending HMS Courageous out to sink submarines. Allied shipping losses to U-boats immediately after America entered the war were enormous, leading German submariners to refer to this period as the "second happy time". From December 1941 through April 1943, U-boats hit about 1,600 ships, once again raising serious concerns whether enough supplies could reach Britain to keep her in the war.

=== Early escort carrier operations (1941-1942) ===
Early in the war, there were not enough vessels available to provide continuous escort across the Atlantic. Having learned the importance of transporting in protected convoys from its World War I experience, Britain hastily assembled Escort Groups using whatever vessels were at hand. These included destroyers, corvettes, sloops, minesweepers, militarized yachts and fishing trawlers. Corvettes constructed rapidly in Britain and Canada from 1939 to 1941 became the essential escort vessel until 1943, when the larger frigates (destroyer escorts in US terms) that were mass-produced in America started to become available. Early British escort groups were made up of about nine vessels, many of which with limited range, that escorted convoys through Britain's Western Approaches.

In May 1941, with help from the Royal Canadian Navy, homeward-bound convoy HX 129 was the first to receive escort for the entire passage. By July, similar coverage was given to Sierra Leone and outward-bound North Atlantic convoys. Merchant ship losses in the North Atlantic temporarily declined in the autumn of 1941 as Germany diverted many U-boats from the Atlantic to the Mediterranean in an effort to prevent the collapse of Italy's army in Africa.

The first use of a carrier escort for convoy protection was made in September 1941 when Britain's first escort carrier, HMS Audacity, escorted convoy OG-74 (Outbound from Britain to Gibraltar). Five of the twenty-five merchant ships were sunk by U-boats (Note: U-124 and U-201.) but a German Luftwaffe attack by land-based aircraft from an airfield in France was repulsed. A German Focke-Wulf Condor was shot down. The return convoy HG-74 (Homeward bound from Gibraltar) was uneventful. Later that month, escorting convoy OG-76 along with the 36th Escort Group, Audacity's aircraft conducted anti-submarine sweeps and fought off German Condors, shooting down four but losing one Grumman Martlet (Note: The Martlet name was dropped in 1944 after which the aircraft were all known as Wildcats in common with the US naming) fighter in the exchange. The return convoy HG-76 of mid-December consisted of 32 merchant ships, including the CAM Empire Darwin, and 17 escorting warships ships, including three destroyers and Audacity. Audacity's Martlet fighters shot down two Condors without a loss and spotted German submarine U-131 which was subsequently depth charged by screening warships and scuttled. This was the first instance of escort carrier-launched aircraft guiding another escort warship to a submarine that resulted in a kill. It demonstrated the potential for routinely including carriers as convoy escorts. The convoy fought through a total of nine U-boats (including wolfpack "Seerauber"), sinking five, (Note: Submarines U-127, 131, 434 U-567, and 574 were sunk. Submarines U-67, U-107, U-108, and U-751 (which sank Audacity), were also part of the attack on HG-76.) and losing three merchant ships, a destroyer and Audacity, which was torpedoed by U-751. Even with the losses, the Admiralty considered the convoy a success. Audacity's aircraft reduced the size of the unprotected area on the Gibraltar convoy route and demonstrated the importance of escort carriers, which carried with them their own fighter and anti-submarine protection. On the German side, the severe losses of U-boats discouraged U-boat commandeer Admiral Dönitz from authorizing such attacks unless U-boats outnumbered convoy escort vessels.

America's first escort carrier, USS Long Island, spent only a few months in the Atlantic Theater. In late December 1941, she escorted a convoy to Newfoundland and, upon her return to Norfolk VA, she was sent to the Pacific.

Before sufficient aircraft carriers became available for escort duty, critical convoys had to be escorted by other capital ships. In January 1942, a month after America had become a full combatant in the war, troop convoys to Britain were initiated to begin building up US Army forces for ultimate invasion of continental Europe. A heavy escort of battleships, cruisers and destroyers escorted these transports, (Note: Troopships were generally liners and sailed at much higher speeds than cargo ships and their escorts) the first leaving Halifax 10 January 1942. When a convoy was close enough to air bases, land-based aircraft also provided protection, but no carriers or carrier-launched aircraft were involved. During this early period, convoys transporting supplies in both the Atlantic and Pacific suffered enormous losses for lack of suitable escorts.

Before sufficient escort carriers became available, fleet carriers had to be used for critical functions. HMS Argus escorted convoys and ferried aircraft. HMS Courageous was on anti-submarine patrol when she was sunk. HMS Glorious was ferrying aircraft when she was sunk. HMS Furious escorted the newly constructed but not yet completely fitted-out escort carriers HMS Archer and HMS Avenger across the Atlantic from America, where they had been built.

From March to May 1942, USS Ranger and USS Wasp remained in the Atlantic Theater and were attached to Britain's Home Fleet enabling the Royal Navy's modern carriers to be sent to the Indian Ocean. The larger American carriers, USS Yorktown and USS Hornet, were also sent from the Atlantic to the Pacific Theater.

Similar to when the escort carrier HMS Audacity had helped reduce the length of time Gibraltar convoys were out of range of protective aircraft in 1941, a year later HMS Avenger helped close the air gap on the Arctic convoy route. In September 1942, she was part of a powerful group that escorted PQ-18, the first North Russia-bound convoy after the disastrous PQ-17 two months earlier. Day after day, her Hawker Hurricane fighters engaged German bombers as surface escorts attacked German submarines. Thirteen merchant ships were sunk, but 41 enemy aircraft and three U-boats were destroyed as 27 merchantmen arrived safely. The return convoy, QP-14, suffered losses of two escort warships and three merchantmen. While the losses were considerable, it was evident that escorting with escort carriers could make an improvement. This pair of convoys also represented a turning point in the Arctic, since thereafter the demands on the German air force in North Africa and the Eastern front reduced the number of aircraft that could be committed to attacking Arctic convoys.

=== Developments in submarine and antisubmarine warfare (1939-1945) ===
Over the course of the war, the Germans weapons systems were improved by refinements to their basic torpedo and by development of a torpedo that could acoustically home-in on ship propellers. Also, when enough submarines became available, wolf-pack tactics were adopted. Each submarine patrolled separately to find convoys and communicate their findings to headquarters, which would direct other submarines to concentrate for coordinated attacks. To extend the range and length of attack submarine patrols, large, specially designed "milk cow" submarines were sent to resupply the attack submarines. Later in the war, snorkels were added to submarines enabling them to recharge their batteries while still submerged, reducing the likelihood of being picked up by radar or patrolling aircraft. Several new types of German submarines were developed, including one that could travel submerged at 25 knots. Tactics evolved with successes. At one point, submariners were even ordered to fight back against aircraft attacks using deck-mounted anti-aircraft guns rather than escape by submerging.

The Allies improved their radar and sonar systems for detecting submarines both on and under the surface of the water. Weapons systems improvements included better stern-deployed depth charges, forward-firing "Hedgehog" mortars and acoustic homing torpedoes dropped from aircraft. Longer range aircraft including the Consolidated PBY Catalina and (from 1941) "Very Long Range" Consolidated B-24 Liberators were used to patrol for and attack submarines, which reduced the size of the mid-ocean air gaps where air protection had to be provided by aircraft carriers. Improvements in ship designs and production rates made improved escort vessels such as escort carriers and destroyer escorts available. Mass production of Liberty Ships helped with timely replacement of shipping tonnage sunk. Improved tactics included better convoy procedures, aircraft endurance patrols forcing submarines to surface at disadvantageous times and places in order to recharge their batteries. Hunter-killer groups of CVEs working with corvettes, destroyers, or destroyer escorts made focused anti-submarine patrols. Some patrols specifically targeted German "milk cow" submarines used for resupplying U-boats at sea. Cryptological intelligence resulting from breaking the German code enabled convoys to be routed around known submarine locations and enabled anti-submarine groups to find and attack them. At least through 1943, the British were at the forefront for innovations of electronics development and German code-breaking, both of which were highly valuable for convoy defense in the Atlantic.

These innovations and counter innovations in submarine warfare greatly affected the relative attrition rates for Axis submarines and Allied transports. There were times during the war when both types of ships were being sunk faster than they were being launched.

=== The turning point (1943) ===
Many historians regard May 1943 as the turning-point in battle for the Atlantic. The turn-around was abrupt and dramatic. There were 133 Allied ships hit by U-boats in the second quarter of 1943 compared to 268 for the previous quarter and 338 for the quarter before that.

For Convoy ONS 5, leaving Liverpool for Halifax 21 April, Admiral Dönitz sent at least 51 U-boats to attack the 42-ship convoy. It was protected by the nine-ship Escort Group B7 Thirteen merchant ships were sunk but the escort ships and Catalina flying boats sank of seven U-boats and badly damaged seven more. Long-range bombers and escort carrier-launched aircraft effectively closed the Mid-Atlantic air gap. Also that month, long-range bombers with microwave radar that the Germans could not detect and powerful searchlights mounted a nighttime offensive in the Bay of Biscay. Added to other actions in May, a total of 38 U-boats were sunk, 12 more than Germany produced that month. The losses during what the Germans called "Black May" caused Dönitz to temporarily discontinue the U-boat campaign. From mid-May and mid-September 1943, there were 62 northern transatlantic convoys with 3,546 merchant vessels between Britain and America. Not a single ship was sunk. Churchill reported to the House of Commons that the supply crisis for the UK had passed.

Faced with little gain and unacceptable losses in the North Atlantic, Dönitz ordered his U-boats to the Central Atlantic, South Atlantic, and Indian Ocean. The US Navy was then transporting hundreds of ships with troops, oil, and other military supplies through the central Atlantic in preparation for the invasion of Sicily. US Admiral Royal Ingersol countered Dönitz' initiative by authorizing commanders of hunter-killer anti-submarine groups to operate independently of convoy movements. These groups were centered on escort carriers (CVEs) and screened by destroyers or destroyer escorts. The CVEs carried F4F Wildcat fighters and TBF Avenger bombers with bombs, depth charges and torpedoes. A typical engagement involved locating a submarine with radar or visually by aircraft on patrol, strafing by a fighter forcing the submarine to dive, and bomber attack immediately after the sub left the surface. Between June and December 1943, hunter-killer groups built around CVEs USS Card, USS Bogue, USS Core, USS Santee, HMS Tracker, and HMS Biter sank a total of 31 U-boats. All ten Type XIV "milk cow" resupply submarines were sunk or scuttled between July and October 1943. USS Block Island sank two U-boats, one being a torpedo resupply sub, between October 1943 and March 1944 before herself being sunk in May off the Canary Islands by U-549. She was the only American carrier sunk in the Atlantic during the war. U-549 was sunk immediately afterward by a destroyer escort from Block Island's screen. (Note: USS Eugene E. Elmore (DE-686)) The following month, the USS Guadalcanal escort carrier group boarded and captured U-505, which was subsequently towed to Bermuda. (Note: U-505 is now on display at the Chicago Museum of Sciences and Industry.) A six-week U-boat initiative was undertaken by Dönitz in the Caribbean during July and August 1943. Very little Allied tonnage was lost but five U-boats were sunk and two more did not return home. In short, Dönitz' Central Atlantic campaign of 1943 did not do much better than his North Atlantic campaign. Overall, during June through August in all waters of the Atlantic and Pacific theaters excluding the Mediterranean, U-boats sank about 58 Allied merchant ships but lost 74 U-boats in return. During the autumn months, the British kept several escort groups including escort carriers at sea ready to be directed to reinforce normal escort support for any convoy believed to be threatened by U-boat attack.

A strong Allied task force including battleships, cruisers, and destroyers was assembled in October 1943 to disrupt shipments of iron ore from Norway to Germany. Dive bombers and torpedo bombers from USS Ranger sank or damaged a tanker, troop transport, and merchant ships near Bodø. Her fighters successfully fended off German land-based bombers.

During 1943 and beyond, the Allies faced the threat that one or more of Germany's powerful battleships would sortie from their bases in Norway to attack Russia convoys or breakout to the Atlantic. Successful Allied operations to sink, damage, or otherwise contain these capital ships variously involved submarines, midget submarines, battleships, and aircraft carriers.

=== Allied dominance in the Atlantic (1944) ===
Allied anti-submarine and anti-blockade runner operations continued in the Atlantic through 1944 but never faced the level of threat as before May 1943. Admiral Dönitz moved his U-boats around looking for soft spots in Allied convoy defenses but, for the most part, lost a disproportionate number of submarines as a result. In January, he moved most of his North Atlantic boats to the vicinity of the Irish Sea. British intelligence detected the move and countered by relocating bombers to bases in Northern Ireland. The Royal Navy's 2nd Escort Group, including escort carriers HMS Nairana and HMS Activity, joined the effort and sank four U-boats. Aircraft from HMS Fencer sank another. When Dönitz moved his boats further west to threaten two convoys, three British escort groups were sent and sank two more U-boats. No merchant ships were lost from the 12 convoys that passed through the Western Approaches during this period, but a total of 11 U-boats were sunk.

In February, Dönitz tried to establish a fueling station off the Azores. American escort carrier hunter-killer groups sank five attack U-boats and then sank the "milk cow" submarine that was to do the refueling. Dönitz then switched his main focus to attacking mid-ocean convoys, but Canadian and British escorts sank three more U-boats. Dönitz ordered surviving submarines further north, but 3 more were sunk, one by aircraft from HMS Vindex. During the first three months of 1944, only three merchant ships were sunk of the 3,360 that crossed the Atlantic in 105 convoys at a cost to Dönitz of 29 U-boats. He temporarily cancelled all U-boat operations against convoys in the Atlantic.

By early 1944, there were finally enough escort carriers available to include them with Arctic convoys. HMS Chaser sailed with convoy RA 57 from the Kola Inlet in March. Escort carriers HMS Activity and HMS Tracker sailed with the next convoy, JW 58 to Kola Inlet. This convoy contained 49 merchant ships and was the largest ever for this route. The carriers' Swordfish anti-submarine aircraft cooperated with surface escorts to sink four U-boats. Carrier-launched fighters drove off shadowing enemy aircraft. Only one merchantmen in these two convoys was lost to enemy action.

Dönitz ordered 58 U-boats to interfere with the Allied landings on Normandy in June 1944. They sank only four small ships at a cost of thirteen U-boats sunk by warships or land-based bombers. After the Germans retreated from France, the U-boat fleet had to operate from Norway, far from the convoy hunting grounds in the Atlantic.

In early 1944, the German battleship Tirpitz, sister-ship to the Bismarck, lay at anchor in northern Norway. She had been a concern to the Allies since her commissioning in 1940, since her breaking out into the Atlantic as a raider would be problematic. She did little during the war but constituted such a potential threat to Allied convoys that she was attacked over two dozen times. Repairs of damage sustained from a miget submarine attack in September 1943 were coming to an end and an attack was launched against her again on 3 April 1944. Battleships, cruisers, destroyers, fleet carriers (HMS Victorious and HMS Furious), and four escort carriers (HMS Searcher, HMS Emperor, HMS Pursuer, HMS Striker) sortied to attack. Bomb damage from carrier-launched aircraft put her out of action again for another three months. Also, the raid deceived the Germans into believing the Allies were contemplating an invasion of Norway instead of or addition to France. Large German forces were kept there, including 30 U-boats at Bergen. Another raid was made on Tirpitz in July by aircraft from Furious, Formidable, and Indefatigable and another in August by the latter two carriers. In another attempt to sink her later that month, long-range Lancaster bombers from Archangel damaged Tirpitz enough for her to need repairs in Tromso in southern Norway. During October and November, Lancasters from British bases tried again and finally succeeded in sinking her. With her threat finally eliminated, the Royal Navy felt comfortable sending Formidable, and Indefatigable to the Far East to join the British Pacific Fleet.

=== Last gasp and final accounting (1945) ===
At the beginning of 1945, the Allies had only a single fleet carrier, HMS Implacable in active combat in the Atlantic Theater. (Note: Other British fleet and light carriers then in the Atlantic theater were HMS Furious, then dedicated to training activities, Argus, then an accommodation ship, Formidable, being refitted at Gibraltar, and Colossus, just commissioned but not yet operational. American fleet carriers USS Shangri-La and Bon Homme Richard were also newly commissioned but not yet operational.) It was engaged in mine-laying and attacking coastal shipping and shore targets between Bergen and Stavanger, Norway. For escort carriers, the British had 12 and the Americans had 10 operational in the Atlantic. Most Allied carriers had by now been deployed in the Pacific.

There was little U-boat activity in the North Atlantic after June 1944. The Kriegsmarine's new snorkel U-boats were mainly deployed in British coastal waters, and only one or two Allied merchant ships were sunk each month in the North Atlantic. Similarly, only a handful were sunk by U-boats in the Mediterranean, South Atlantic, and Indian Ocean.

U-boat attacks continued on the Arctic convoys. In February 1945, convoy JW 64 with 26 merchantmen was attacked by a 30 U-boat force and Luftwaffe torpedo-bombers. Carrier-launched fighters from escort carriers HMS Campania and HMS Nairana along with anti-aircraft fire from the screen drove back the attack. No merchant ships were hit. The return convoy with 34 merchantmen and an escort including HMS Nairana struggled through U-boat attacks and gale-force weather. The next outbound convoy with 24 ships lost two merchantmen and one of the escort vessels. For JW 66, the last outward-bound Arctic convoy of the war, an escort support group was sent ahead of the merchant ships to clear the way. The same was done for the corresponding homeward convoy. For this final round trip, one escort frigate but no merchantmen were sunk and the escorts sank two U-boats.

Convoys to northern Russia continued through May 1945. By this time, however, more supplies had been transported to her using other routes, including the northern Pacific route. After Turkey declared war on Germany in February 1945, a route through the Black Sea strait opened up that supplanted the Persian corridor route. Summarizing the results of the Arctic convoys to northern Russia during the war, 720 ships in 40 outbound convoys arrived safely delivering about 5,000 tanks and over 7,000 aircraft. Ninety-two merchantmen and 18 escorting warships were lost due to enemy action. In return, the Allies sank a German battleship, (Note: German battleship Scharnhorst) three destroyers and 38 U-boats.

U-boat activity continued to the last days of World War II. New U-boats were being launched faster than they were being sunk. Some of Germany's new types designed to operate primarily underwater with higher underwater speed and snorkels were entering the battle. Operational U-boat strength reached its wartime peak of 463 boats in March 1945, but were sinking relatively few Allied merchantmen while losing boats when they did engage. That month, Admiral Dönitz sent Wolfpack Seewolf, comprising several snorkel-type submarines, into North Atlantic waters. Fearing that these submarines might be capable of launching V-1 rockets on East Coast cities, Americans hastily initiated Operation Teardrop to create warship barriers to intercept them. American CVEs USS Bogue, USS Croatan, USS Core, and USS Mission Bay were part of that effort along with 20 destroyer escorts. Snorkel U-boats were very difficult to spot from the air. In addition, the heavy fog prevented carrier aircraft scouting from being maintained. Nonetheless, guided by intelligence from decrypted German radio transmissions, five submarine sinkings were accomplished by the destroyer escorts A destroyer escort from the USS Mission Bay escort carrier group sank U-881, the last submarine sinking in the Battle of the Atlantic. The following day, the war in Europe ended.

Over the course of the war, Germany had a total of about 1,150 U-boats in service. According to Morison, these U-boats sank 2,572 Allied and neutral nation merchant ships totaling 14.5 million tons, mostly in the Atlantic Theater. Italian submarines sank another 94 ships totaling 0.5 million tons. British and American loss of life for merchant mariners was at least 45,000. In return, the Germans and Italians lost 785 (Note: Estimates for German U-boat losses range from 765 (uboat.net) and 781 (Morison, Two-Ocean War, p. 562) to 785 (Roskill, p. 422 and Y'Blood, Hunter-Killer, p. 272)) and 84 submarines respectively Thirty-two thousand U-boat men lost their lives.

Use of the convoy system significantly reduced Allied shipping losses. About 70% of merchant ships sunk by submarines were unescorted or stragglers from convoys compared to the 30% that were sailing in convoys. From the beginning of the war through 1942, about 4,450 Allied and neutral ships were lost from all causes, including land-base aircraft, submarines and raiders. After the convoy system became fully operational in 1943, only about 1,450 such ships were lost.

Many new anti-submarine tactics, detection systems, and weapons were developed during the War. Perhaps the greatest single factor for combating U-boats in the Atlantic, aside from the convoy system, was the use of Enigma decrypts that enabled rerouting convoys to safer routes and guiding warships and aircraft to U-boat locations for attack. This, along with radar, sonar and radio direction finding, reduced the U-boats' invisibility, which was their greatest defense. Of the 54 U-boats sunk by American escort carrier groups, all but one had direct or indirect help from Enigma Intelligence.

Although the tide had turned against the U-boats before escort carriers became significant players in anti-submarine warfare, CVEs played an important role in reducing shipping losses. Carrier-launched aircraft from American escort carrier groups sank 31 U-boats and their escort destroyers and destroyer escorts sank another 23 alone or in conjunction with carrier aircraft. The Royal Navy Fleet Arm sank at least another 31 U-boats. Naval historian Stephen Roskill estimates the causes of U-boat losses as follows:

Causes of U-boat Losses	Losses
Surface Ships	246
Shore based aircraft (excluding raids)	245
Ship borne aircraft	43
Shared between surface ships and aircraft	50
Submarines	21
Bombing raids	61
Mines	26
Accidents, marine causes, scuttling	57
Russian action	7
Unknown	29
Total Sunk	785

Countries Sinking U-boats	Losses
Britain & Commonwealth	514
USA	166
UK & USA Shared	12
Other	93
Total Sunk	785

Warships and land-based aircraft sunk many more U-boats than carrier aircraft, but the patrols in ocean air gaps that could not be covered by land-based aircraft were critical for Allied success. In addition to the U-boats sunk by carrier aircraft, warplane presence overhead degraded U-boat performance by keeping them under the surface more of the time and by reducing the aggressiveness of the U-boat commanders. Morison credits escort carriers as probably the single greatest contribution by the US Navy to victory over enemy submarines. Roskill also gives credit to the "tiny force of anti-submarine aircraft embarked in the escort carriers," but also recognizes the major contributions from the other escorting warships and from land-based, very-long-range aircraft.

== Battle of the Mediterranean (1939-1943) ==
Like the Battle of the Atlantic, much of the Battle of the Mediterranean was about combatants denying each other the use of critical shipping lanes while keeping those lanes open for themselves. The Allies sought to protect strategic bases at Gibraltar, Malta, and Egypt against invasion. The Axis powers sought to cut lanes to neutralize Malta, thereby protecting their own supply line to North Africa, and to extend territorial control to include Greece. Malta was of critical importance to the Allies in the Mediterranean for offensive actions against Axis shipping and as an intelligence gathering station.

=== Neutralization of the French fleet (1940-1942) ===
The Fall of France and establishment of the government at Vichy in June 1940 caused anxiety in Britain regarding which combatant, if any, would get the use of the warships of the French Navy then mostly anchored in North African ports. The French Navy was the world's fourth largest, after Britain, America, and Japan. With Britain now standing alone against the seemingly invincible Axis juggernaut, command of the sea was considered essential to her survival. British intelligence had learned that the Germans had acquired and were using French naval codes. It seemed likely to the British that Germany would soon acquire use of the French ships, regardless of Vichy French assurances that this would not happen. The resulting combined Italian/French/German navies would dominate the Mediterranean and change the balance of power on the high seas. The French ships could also facilitate the invasion of Britain itself, which British leadership believed to be immanent. Alternatively, decisive action by the British to prevent German assimilation of the French fleet could maintain British naval superiority and send a message to the Americans and others that Britain was determined to continue to fight.

Proposals were made to Vichy France naval leadership in French North Africa for them to continue to fight Germany alongside Britain. Alternative proposals for ensuring French warships would not be available to the Axis included quarantining them in neutral ports for the remainder of the war or scuttling them. If none of these alternatives was accepted, Britain declared it would sink the French fleet itself. The proposals were not accepted. Accordingly, in July 1940, British warships of the newly formed Force H including HMS Ark Royal sailed from Gibraltar and in [Operation Catapult attacked the French fleet at Mers El Kébir and Oran. In these Vichy French ports were two modern battleships, two older battleships and 21 other warships. Aircraft from Ark Royal provided reconnaissance confirming that the French Fleet was preparing to sail rather than accept Britain's terms. This aircraft also spotted from overhead to assist with naval bombardment and dropped mines to blockade the port's entrance and that at Oran. Next day, that aircraft further damaged a French battleship at Mers-el-Kebir with torpedoes. Finally, it pursued the French warships that broke out of the harbor, attacking them with torpedoes. This was the first instance of using an aircraft-launched torpedo on a capital ship at sea.

A few days later, aircraft from the HMS Hermes torpedoed another, new and powerful French battleship (Note: Richelieu) in the Vichy French port of Dakar in French West Africa, inflicting minor damage. In contrast, skillful and mutually respectful negotiations between British and French commanders in Alexandria, Egypt, resulted in a demilitarization of the French fleet there without having to resort to military action.

In September 1940, the British made another attempt to neutralize Dakar and its Vichy French warships. This attempt was combined with plans to invade and install Free French forces led by Charles de Gaulle. Battleships exchanged gunfire and aircraft from Ark Royal dropped bombs, but the effort failed. One result was to further increase the resentment of the Vichy French navy against the British that may have inclined the French to resist Allied landings in North Africa two years later.

After the successful Allied invasion of French Morocco in November 1942, Vichy France began cooperating with the Allies. Fulfilling pledges made by French leaders two years earlier that their warships would never be used by the Axis, they scuttled their remaining Mediterranean fleet at Toulon to prevent its warships from falling under German control. France's only operational aircraft carrier, the Béarn, spent most of the war effectively in quarantine in Martinique and did not launch aircraft in combat.

=== Air-naval battles between Italy and Britain (1940-1941) ===
Italy's Regia Marina was the world's fifth largest navy, nearly as large as that of France. Days after the French North African fleet had been neutralized at Mers-el-Kébir, Britain's focus in the Mediterranean turned toward Italy. With France knocked out of the war by Germany and with Italy joining the war following Germany's many military successes, the dominance of naval power in the Mediterranean shifted from the Allies to the Axis. Not only did Italy have considerable naval power, its land-based aircraft could reach almost anywhere in the Mediterranean, regarded by the Italians as "our sea" as it had been in the time of the Roman Empire.

Italian land-based aircraft could easily bomb Britain's critical base at Malta as well as the ships transporting critical supplies to her. Unlike Italy, with only a 170-mile sea lane to protect from Marsala in Sicily to Tunis in North Africa, Britain's strong positions at either end of the Mediterranean at Alexandria in the east and Gibraltar in the west were 1,000 miles and 1,200 miles respectively from Malta. Forty miles south of Sicily, Malta was subjected to Axis siege. If Malta fell, Britain would be forced to support Egypt by shipments around the Cape of Good Hope and through the Suez Canal, which would lengthen the lifeline for supplies by thousands of miles and several weeks. Aircraft carriers, however, provided Britain with the possibility of keeping the central Mediterranean open for convoys to Malta and Egypt. Aircraft carriers also constrained Italy and later Germany in their efforts supply their troops in North Africa.

In early July 1940, a British naval force with battleships, cruisers, destroyers, and the fleet carrier HMS Eagle sailed from Alexandria to the Mediterranean's central basin to protect two convoys from Malta to Alexandria and to find and destroy Italian naval forces. At the same time a greatly superior Italian Fleet of battleships, cruisers and destroyers was escorting an Italian convoy destined for Libya. The location of the Italian Fleet was reported by a British submarine and a long range reconnaissance plane. British and Australian ships attacked. During the ensuing Battle of Calabria, Fairey Swordfish torpedo bombers from HMS Eagle attacked the Italian convoy as the battleships exchanged gunfire. The torpedo attacks did little more than disrupt Italian formations, reportedly because of faulty British torpedo detonators. Italian land-based bombers also caused little damage, dropping their bomb from 10,000 feet. However, a near miss damaged the Eagle enough to prevent her from participating on the upcoming, famous raid on Taranto. Overall, the Battle of Calabria was indecisive, but it resulted in greater confidence on the part of the British for confronting the Italian navy in its home waters.

In early August, recognizing that Malta's fighter defenses needed strengthening, 12 Hurricane fighters were transported by HMS Argus to a point southwest of Sardinia from which they launched and flew to Malta. This was the first of many such hazardous operations undertaken to keep Malta in the war.

Ark Royal's aircraft attacked Italian land bases for the first time in August 1940. British bombing of airbases and mine laying at Cagliari harbor were unsuccessfully opposed by the Italian air force. On the last day of August, a significant British technological development, radio direction finding aka radar, was first used to alert the Ark Royal to approaching enemy aircraft. Her fighters were launched in time to fight off the attackers before they reached the carrier, inaugurating a new era in anti-aircraft defense.

In September, as Italian land forces were approaching Egypt, Fairey Swordfish from HMS Illustrious joined British warships to bomb and bombard Italian supply lines. The advance was turned back.

Additional carrier-launched raids in November by Ark Royal on the Italian mainland damaged hangars and factories despite strengthened Italian antiaircraft defenses. In late November 1940, while Force H was escorting a convoy carrying tanks and military stores from Gibraltar to Alexandria, a reconnaissance patrol from Ark Royal spotted an Italian fleet south of Sardinia that included two battleships and six cruisers . Torpedo bombers were launched and repeated attacks resulted in damage to an Italian cruiser. The limited success of the attacks was later ascribed principally, once again, to faulty torpedoes. At the same time, bombers from the Italian Air Force made determined attacks on the Ark Royal, but without success.

Also in November 1940, carrier-launched attacks were made from Ark Royal on the dam at Lake Tirso in Sardinia. In February 1941, an oil refinery, factory, airfield, and railroad junction were bombed and a harbor mined. Genoa was bombarded by guns from Force H as aircraft provided spotting services from overhead. All these raids would not have been possible without Britain's strong aircraft carrier capability.

Ark Royal aircraft protected convoys and scouted for German raiders and their supply ships in the Atlantic as well as the Mediterranean. At the same time, the carrier had to protect itself against the Italian fleet and against land-based aircraft that sometimes attacked with as many as thirty-six torpedo-bombers at a time. Effective defense by the carrier's fighters shot down attackers or harassed them to the point that they often jettisoned their bombs and retreated. British success against Italy resulted in Germany's transferring 150 land-based bombers to Sicily with orders to attack British warships in the straits between Sicily and North Africa and at Alexandria.

=== Raid on Taranto (Nov 1940) ===
In November 1940, the Italian navy had six battleships and several heavy cruisers at its large base at Taranto, Italy. HMS Eagle had been too badly damaged in recent operations to participate in a raid on Taranto, but the HMS Illustrious had recently arrived in the Mediterranean. She was screened by four cruisers and four destroyers. Photos of the shallow harbor taken by reconnaissance planes based on Malta were flown to the Illustrious and specific warship targets identified. That same day, two waves of Fairey Swordfish, variously carrying bombs, torpedoes, and flares, were launched from Illustrious and flew the 170 miles to Taranto. Ultimately, a total of about 21 aircraft, eleven with torpedoes, navigated through a balloon barrage and dodged anti-aircraft fire to sink three battleships and damage a cruiser. The cost to the British was two aircraft downed and pilots killed. More Italian ships would have been damaged except that some bombs failed to explode. In any event, half of Italy's capital ship navy was rendered unusable, which went a long way toward equalizing the balance of naval power in the Mediterranean. It also demonstrated the extraordinary potential for carrier-launched aircraft.

On Illustrious's return from Taranto to Alexandria, her Fulmer fighters shot down Italian CANT patrol float planes and Fiat fighters, bombed Rhodes and Tripoli harbors, and sank Italian merchant ships.

The successful tactics and torpedo modifications used by the British for their raid on Taranto were carefully studied by the Japanese as they planned their raid on Pearl Harbor, another shallow harbor rich in warship targets.

=== Allied reversals in North Africa, Greece, and Crete (1940-1941) ===
In late 1940, Britain's Army of the Nile successfully repulsed an Italian attempt to invade Egypt, pushing them back to Benghazi in Libya. To support this drive, Hurricane fighters had been ferried crated to the Gold Coast in West Africa by HMS Furious, assembled there, and then flown across Africa to Egypt. This British initiative came to a halt in early 1941 when troops were diverted to Greece for Operation Lustre to counter the Axis invasion there. As British troops were being removed from Africa, the Axis significantly strengthened their presence there. This enabled German General Erwin Rommel to begin the push of his Afrika Korps toward Egypt that was not stopped until late 1942 at El Alamein..

In January 1941, a convoy was assembled to resupply Malta and Greece from Gibraltar. Simultaneously, a convoy was initiated from Alexandria to resupply Malta from the east and bring back empty merchant ships. HMS Illustrious provided air cover for the Alexandria convoy and was badly damaged by German Junkers bombers, both while at sea and later while receiving temporary repairs at Malta. This damage ultimately resulted in Illustrious being sent to America for permanent repairs, removing her from service from several months.

In March 1941, the Italian fleet moved against the convoys supporting the Allied invasion of Greece. In one of World War II's earliest successes for operationally useful code breaking, British intelligence at Bletchley Park detected and reported this advance. In response, the British Navy sent a strong force resulting in the Battle of Cape Matapan south of Greece. Aircraft from HMS Formidable, which had made the lengthy voyage around the Cape of Good Hope, through the Indian Ocean and the Red Sea, to reach the eastern Mediterranean and replace the damaged HMS Illustrious, located the enemy force and then launched torpedo-bombers to attack. The ensuing gun battle between warships resulted in the sinking of five Italian warships against the loss of only one British aircraft.

The Allies did not fare as well on land. Rommel advanced to Tobruk and beyond in North Africa and Germany successfully invaded Greece and Yugoslavia. German paratroopers overran Crete. In April, British withdrawal from Greece began, meaning that no benefit had resulted from weakening their forces in North Africa. Naval engagements while rescuing British troops from Crete in May cost the British navy dearly. Three light cruisers and six destroyers were sunk; the carrier HMS Formidable, two battleships, six cruisers, and seven destroyers were damaged. British losses during this operation were greater than Italian losses sustained at the Battle of Cape Matapan. Nonetheless, the British retained control of the sea. However the Germans retained control the air, which severely limited British movements in the eastern Mediterranean.

=== Siege of Malta, Part I: (June 1940 - Nov 1941) ===
The removal of the damaged HMS Illustrious in February 1941 marked the end of the first period in which Britain's navy held sway in the Mediterranean. HMS Formidable was immediately sent to replace her. Instead of passing the Straits of Gibraltar through the Mediterranean, Formidable traveled in relative safety around the Cape of Good Hope to Alexandria, Britain having eliminated by this time Italian naval opposition in the Red Sea. However, this resulted in many weeks passing before Formidable's reached the Mediterranean. German bombers in the Mediterranean continued to make British naval operations there very risky.

Now having the advantage in the central Mediterranean, the Axis powers laid siege to Malta using land-based aircraft and submarines to choke-off supplies to the island. Neutralizing forces at Malta was essential if adequate Axis supplies and troop reinforcements were to reach North Africa. Allied aircraft carriers, along with Malta-based submarines and aircraft, played an essential role in thwarting Axis intentions by attacking Axis naval forces and installations, sinking Axis troopships, ferrying Allied aircraft, and providing protective cover for Allied resupply convoys.

In April 1942, as part of Operation Calendar, USS Wasp sailed with Force W of the British Home Fleet and transported 47 Supermarine Spitfire fighters to the Western Mediterranean. From there they were launched from Wasp for flight to Malta. Many of these airplanes were destroyed on the ground as soon as they arrived by German raids on Malta that anticipated the aircraft delivery. In May, Wasp and HMS Eagle delivered 47 Spitfires and 17 Spitfires as part of Operation Bowery. Careful coordination for the arrival at Malta enabled British aircraft to repulse a combined Italian/German air assault that resulted in the loss of 47 German aircraft at a cost to the British of only three. More aircraft deliveries were made to Malta in May (Eagle 16 fighters, Operation LB) and June (Eagle 28 delivered).

Aircraft and submarine operations from Malta continued to be critical for Allied efforts to stop the flow of men and material to the Africa Corps. In April, HMS Ark Royal sailed east from Gibraltar and launched Hurricane fighters bound for Malta. She repeated this effort in May, before diverted to the Atlantic to help find and sink the Bismarck. Soon afterward, in June, she was back in the Mediterranean. Fortunately for Malta, Axis strength in Mediterranean was weakened in May as Germany transferred a significant number of its bombers away from Sicily in preparation for its launch of Operation Barbarossa, the invasion of Russia. Malta was reinforced again in June with fighter aircraft launched from Force H, now including both HMS Ark Royal and HMS Victorious. More fighters were launched from Ark Royal to reach Malta in September. Merchant ship convoys protected by carrier aircraft also delivered critical supplies in January, July, and September, losing only one ship of the 39 total. Ark Royal successfully sent a squadron of torpedo-bombers to Malta in October and more fighters and bombers in November. Then her remarkable career came to an end.

=== Loss of HMS Ark Royal (Nov 1941) ===
Early in the war, HMS Ark Royal distinguished herself by demonstrating the power of aircraft carriers. Just as the European War broke out in September 1939, she was with the anti-submarine hunter-killer group whose destroyers sank U-39 northwest of Scotland. It was the first U-boat sinking of the war. Later that month, under attack by German seaplanes in the sea between Denmark and Sweden, her aircraft shot one down, again the first such success of the war. In these and later engagements, Ark Royal successfully dodged submarine-launched torpedoes and aircraft bombs. German propaganda proudly but incorrectly announced that she had been sunk. In December, alive and well, she pursued the German raider Admiral Graf Spee across the Atlantic, contributing to that ship's captain deciding to scuttle her. In the spring of 1940, Ark Royal's aircraft provided fighter protection for British warships during the Norwegian Campaign, the first time carrier aircraft had been assigned such a task. Her aircraft also bombed shipping and shore targets there. In July 1940 in the Mediterranean, her aircraft participated in the destruction of the Vichy French Fleet at Mers-el-Kébir. She provided air cover for convoys resupplying Malta with aircraft and other military supplies and attacked Italian air bases. In October 1940, her aircraft bombed Vichy French installations at Daker, Senegal. Returning to the Mediterranean in November, her aircraft supported convoys to Malta and attacked the Italian fleet that was attempting to disrupt Allied convoy movements. As part of Force H in February 1941, she boldly sailed into the Gulf of Genoa. Her aircraft laid mines off Spezia and bombed the oil refinery at Leghorn. Later that month, she sailed back in the Atlantic searching for German raiders and was back in the Mediterranean again by March to again provide protection for the critical convoys to Malta and Alexandria. In May, back in the Atlantic off the coast of France, Ark Royal's torpedo planes famously crippled the German battleship-raider Bismarck, making her sinking inevitable. Again returning to the Mediterranean, Ark Royal aircraft supported convoys that helped keep Malta in the war and disrupting Axis shipping from Italy to Africa at the critical time that Germany's Afrika Korps was preparing for a campaign against Egypt. All these achievements earned Ark Royal the Allies admiration and affection.

In mid-November 1941, while returning to Gibraltar after ferrying aircraft to Malta, Ark Royal was hit by a single torpedo from U-81. Determined efforts to save her failed and she sank 35 miles away from Gibraltar the next day. Her loss was a devastating blow to the Royal Navy's power in the Mediterranean and to the morale of the British people. The German Ministry of Propaganda announced again the famous ship had been sunk, two years after the first such claim. Subsequent investigations resulted in the court martial of Ark Royal's captain. Design improvements were made for future carriers.

=== Siege of Malta, Part II: (Nov 1941-Nov 1942) ===
It was not possible to replace Ark Royal in the Mediterranean immediately because other fleet carriers had recently been damaged. Consequently, the situation of the Allies in the Mediterranean rapidly deteriorated. Attacks on Axis shipping from Italy to North Africa continued from Malta, prompting Germany to return some bombers to Sicily from Russia. In addition, many U-boats were transferred from the Atlantic to the Mediterranean, where German torpedoes sank a British battleship and a cruiser. The effectiveness of Malta's naval Force K was eliminated in December by mines laid by Italian destroyers. Finally, entry of Japan into the war on the side of the Axis powers created the need for the Allies to divert warships from the Atlantic Theater to face their new crisis in the Pacific. Within three months, five of the Allies' fleet carriers were moved to the Pacific Theater. (Note: HMS Formidable, HMS Indomitable, HMS Illustrious, USS Yorktown, and USS Hornet.) This left only six (Note: HMS Argus, HMS Eagle, HMS Furious, HMS Victorius, USS Ranger, and USS Wasp. The USS Wasp was moved to the Pacific in June 1942 after US carrier losses at the battles of Coral Sea and Midway but after a second delivery of aircraft to Malta.) of their 15 fleet and light carriers in the Atlantic.

The shift in power enabled the Italian fleet to successfully escort convoys to Africa that, in turn, enabled the Afrika Korps to strike eastward. Loss of Allies' airfields crippled their efforts to supply Malta by air from North Africa, making Malta again dependent upon convoys running the gauntlet through the Mediterranean. Merchant ship convoys, however, were hazardous. In March, only a fifth of the cargo intended for Malta got through Italian naval action and German bombing in the Gulf of Sirte. Air raids in April did heavy damage to Malta's dockyard.

Relief came in April, May, and June 1942 as carriers USS Wasp and HMS Eagle between them made five deliveries of Spitfire fighters to Malta. Germany had redeployed most of their bombers away from Sicily believing Malta had been neutralized. The Spitfire deliveries were challenged by Axis aircraft, but the air battles were won by the Allies, marking the turning point in the long siege of Malta. She was able to resume offensives with surface ships, strike aircraft, and submarines against Axis shipping, weakening Rommel's Afrika Korps that was then driving east toward Egypt.

Merchant ship convoys, however, continued to suffer serious losses, and resupply of Malta from the east was considered untenable. A critically important convoy from the west was assembled in August 1942 as part of Operation Pedestal. Fourteen merchant vessels, including the American oiler SS Ohio were part of the convoy. Spitfires were to be launched from HMS Furious while air cover for the entire convoy was provided by fighters from three carriers, HMS Eagle, HMS Victorious, and HMS Indomitable. Additional escort was provided by two battleships, seven cruisers, and 24 destroyers, forming the largest ever convoy to Malta. It was attacked by German and Italian submarines, other Axis warships and some 80 land-based torpedo- and dive-bombers, resulting in serious losses. Eagle was struck by a torpedo from U-73 and sank. Indomitable sustained damage to her flight deck, leaving only Victorious remaining to provide fighter protection for the convoy, at least until she reached the turn-around point for most of the heavy escorts off Bizerte. The Spitfires were successfully launched, but only five of the 14 merchant ships survived the three day attack to arrive at Malta. One of them, damaged by three bomb hits, was the SS Ohio, whose large delivery of oil sustained Malta and kept her assaulting Axis shipping and weakening the Axis German-Italian Panzer Army in North Africa prior to the Second battle of El Alamein. Arrival of Ohio was judged to justify the entire, costly effort.

The siege of Malta effectively ended in November 1942 when the Allies invaded French North Africa with Operation Torch. At that time, the principal Axis effort to protect their supply lines shifted from neutralizing Malta to protecting the ports in Tunisia.

A total of seven fleet carriers had been used to undertake twenty-eight separate Malta resupply operations between August 1940 and October 1942. Those carriers were HMS Argus, HMS Illustrious, HMS Ark Royal, HMS Victorious, and HMS Eagle, HMS Furious, and USS Wasp. Eagle alone made nine such ferrying trips, sending 183 Spitfires to the island. The Ark Royal and Eagle were sunk in the Mediterranean during this period.

=== Clearing the Eastern Mediterranean (1944) ===
The naval battles of the Mediterranean ended with Axis army defeats in North Africa and the Italian armistice with the Allies in September 1943. German U-boat activity continued, however, and several pockets of Axis forces remained in the Eastern Mediterranean.

From January to May 1944, U-boats and German bombers sank only ten Allied merchant ships, losing 12 U-boats. By the end of May, there were only 13 U-boats operating in the Mediterranean. The few U-boats based in Toulon that survived Allied bombing were scuttled by the Germans in August. Coupled with the reduced threat in the Atlantic because German airfields and submarine bases in France were captured, many escort vessels in the Atlantic could be shifted to the Pacific. Other such vessels were shifted to British waters, where Germany's new snorkel U-boats had become an increasing threat.

In September, German forces began withdrawing from southern Greece, Crete, and the Aegean islands. They did so under fire from British escort carriers, cruisers, and destroyers. The last two U-boats in the Mediterranean were sunk in the process. Task Force 88 in the Mediterranean supported operations to occupy Islands in the Eastern Mediterranean. British escort carriers in TF88 included Stalker, Attacker, Emperor, Searcher, Pursuer, and Khedive. They supported attacks on Crete and Rhodes (Operations Outing I and Cablegram). They also supported the main landings in Greece (Operation Manna).

Germany's naval campaign in the Mediterranean cost them 68 U-boats. In return, they sank 98 Allied merchant ships, a battleship, four cruisers, twelve destroyers, and the carriers HMS Ark Royal and HMS Eagle. With the naval threat to the Mediterranean gone, many heavy British warships began moving to the Indian Ocean.

== Allied invasion of French North Africa (1942) ==
Pressed for military action by the USSR, Britain and America opened a second front in French North Africa in November 1942. Not wanting this campaign to be repulsed as had happened in Norway, France, and Greece, and unable to mount a cross-Channel invasion, the Allies adopted Winston Churchill's proposal to approach Germany through Italy, described by him as the "soft underbelly" of the Axis. The invasion of French North Africa was by amphibious landings there at the same time as Britain's decisive victory over German forces at the other end of the Mediterranean in the Second Battle of El Alamein. The combination of these events, combined with the successful Soviet resistance at Stalingrad, signaled the shift of strategic initiative in the Mediterranean from the Axis to the Allies. Code-named Operation Torch, the invasion of the French colonies involved coordinated landings of three separate task forces in western, central, and eastern target zones. Negotiations with the Vichy French forces there that would allow the Allied landings to proceed unopposed were unsuccessful.

=== Western Task Force- Casablanca ===
The Western Task Force, with 35,000 mostly inexperienced US troops transported directly from Norfolk, Virginia, landed at three attack sites within the western target zone centered on Casablanca in French Morocco. Never before had an amphibious landing been attempted on a shore separated from its staging area by the width of an ocean. German U-boats were operating effectively in the Atlantic at that time and represented a great danger to the transports, both during the ocean crossing and during unloading. The crossing was protected en route by a strong armada of warships that was twenty-five miles long and twenty-five miles wide.

The Air Group of carriers joined the fleet as it passed Bermuda. It included the fleet carrier Ranger and all four of the newly commissioned, converted oil tanker Sangamon-class escort carriers, USS Santee, Sangamon, Chenango, and Suwannee. These would be the first American escort carriers to see combat action. They had been rushed to completion, along with air crew training, in order to support this invasion. Vichy France was believed to have 170 aircraft available to oppose the landings. British aircraft operating from Gibraltar were would support the center and eastern but not the western task forces. Combat air support for the western task forces would have to be provided exclusively by carrier-launched aircraft. Chenango was charged with transporting aircraft for use at key Moroccan airdromes after ground troops occupied them. She carried 78 single-engine, single-seat Curtiss P-40 Warhawk fighters, filling her hangar and deck and leaving no room for maintaining a combat squadron of her own. The other three escort carriers had a total of 99 planes ready for combat. With Ranger's 72 planes, the Air Group's total was 171 combat-ready aircraft: 109 Grumman F4F Wildcat fighters, 36 Douglas SBD Dauntless dive bombers, and 26 Grumman TBF Avenger torpedo bombers. The attack on Casablanca involved three Attack Groups: Center, Southern, and Northern.

Center Attack Group.

Troops began landing in the darkness on 8 November 1942. At first daylight, action began for the Center Attack Group at Fedhala near Casablanca. Ranger's fighters took off and destroyed planes on the ground at three principal French airdromes around Casablanca. Her Dauntless dive-bombers along with Avenger torpedo bombers from Suwannee attacked the submarine base in Casablanca Harbor. They also attacked a cruiser and gun batteries. Wildcat fighters from Suwannee conducted combat air patrols including anti-submarine patrols. This Naval Battle of Casablanca involved heavy gunfire back and forth from an American battleship, cruisers, and destroyers and return fire from French shore positions, destroyers, and eight of the eleven Vichy French submarines which remained operational despite the early morning bombing raid. French aircraft challenged American planes, but the latter achieved command of the air.

Southern Attack Group.

This group was tasked with securing a landing site for the Task Force tanks at Safi, south of Casablanca. Covered by guns from a battleship and cruiser, (Note: Battleship USS New York and cruiser USS Philadelphia.) a bold predawn attack by assault troops on 8 November took the quay. Aircraft from Santee neutralized the airdrome at Marrakesh, and by afternoon tanks began offloading. By 10 November, they were headed toward Casablanca for an all-out assault. Santee aircraft did spotting for American warship's guns, photo reconnaissance, and patrols searching for enemy cruisers and submarines, attacking one of the latter.

Northern Attack Group.

This group was tasked with capturing a key airdrome at Port Lyautey up the river from the coastal port of Mehedia, north of Casablanca. Air cover was provided by aircraft from Sangamon, which carried both fighters and bombers. Chenango carried the army planes that were to flown to the airdrome once it fell to Allied forces. Overcoming stiff French resistance on 10 November, a determined destroyer (Note: USS Dallas earned a Presidential Unit Citation for this action.) broke through an upriver boom and delivered a raider detachment that captured the airdrome. Shortly thereafter, P-40s from Chenango were using the airfield.

Following these Allied successes, Vichy French leadership negotiated a cease-fire under which they would not oppose Allied takeover and military use of port facilities. In return, Vichy French Admiral Francois Darlan, Commander-in-Chief of the French Armed Forces, who was in North Africa at the time was given responsibility for the civil and military government in North Africa.

=== Central Task Force- Oran ===
The Central Task Force, with 39,000 American troops transported by the Royal Navy from the UK, landed at attack sites centered around Oran in Algeria. The main troop landings took place at three beaches on either side of Oran, but a small raiding force boldly attempted a landing inside the harbor itself. The expectation was that the French would not oppose the Allied landings and that an undamaged port and the 31 French warships there would fall into Allied hands. No air cover was provided for the operation.

This Operation Reservist involved about 400 American troops being transported by two British sloops (Note: HMS Walney and HMS Hartland) down the narrow harbor. The Allies believed that surprise and French reluctance to fire on them would lead to success. Instead, the force received point-blank fire from the 4,000 defending French on land and on warship that killed most of the landing force and sank both sloops. The French fleet escaped the harbor. Fighting continued for two days until Allied forces landing on the beaches east and west of the harbor converged on Oran. The port was taken but heavily damaged. Airfields outside Oran were taken by US airborne troops flown from Britain.

=== Eastern Task Force- Algiers ===
The Eastern Task Force, with 23,000 British and 10,000 American troops transported by the Royal Navy from the UK, landed at three attack sites centered around Algiers the capital of French Algeria. As with Oran, these landings anticipated that surprise and French reluctance to fire on the Allies would lead to acquiring the port undamaged and without major resistance.

Operation Terminal, similar to Operation Reservist, involved 600 Americans being transported by two British destroyers (Note: HMS Malcolm and Broke.) into the port of Algiers. One destroyer was sunk and the other damaged. The American raiding party was surrounded and surrendered. The port was ultimately taken undamaged when the French defenders later surrendered to the Allied forces that had landed unopposed on beaches east and west of the port. Axis reaction to the collapse of French resistance to the Allied invasion was to initiate severe bombing and torpedo attacks by land-based aircraft.

=== Allied victory in Africa ===
The successful Allied invasion of western North Africa, possible because of maritime dominance, significantly improved the Allied strategic position in both the western Mediterranean and the Atlantic. From North African land bases, the Allies could now better protect convoys sustaining both Malta and Britain herself. Even with the loss of life and damage to Allied ships sustained during Operation Torch, naval historian Stephen Roskill concludes that rarely was so much gained during the war at such relatively small cost.

During the same month as the landings in French North Africa, the Axis drive for Egypt ended with their defeat at the Second Battle of El Alamein in November 1942. These events led Germany to disregard the territorial integrity of Vichy France and occupy southern France, thereby protecting the southern coast against invasion. This action by Germany, in turn, led the Vichy French to scuttle their fleet at Toulon, preventing it from being used by the Axis. As land battles continued across North Africa, escort carriers regularly accompanied convoys that ferried aircraft to Casablanca as well as Gibraltar and on to Malta to support the Allied advance and to help establish air superiority. Allied cruiser and destroyer striking forces, the Allied submarine fleet operating from Malta, and aircraft from Malta and Bone in Algeria gained control of the narrows in the Mediterranean between Italy and Africa. This choked off supplies to the Axis forces in Africa. Over 500 Axis merchantmen were sunk between January and mid-May 1943, when the last Axis soldiers surrendered. U-boat presence in the Mediterranean was dramatically reduced, in part by constant air patrolling that denied U-boats the opportunity to safely surface and recharge their batteries.

== Allied invasion of Italy (1943) ==
=== Allied invasion of Sicily/Operation Husky ===
The Allied invasion of Sicily beginning July 10, 1943 with largely unopposed airborne and amphibious landings were supported by land-based aircraft in North Africa and Malta as well as by battleship shellfire rather than by carrier-launched aircraft. The only carrier in the area was HMS Indomitable which, along with the rest of Force H, was deployed in Ionian Sea to prevent interference from the Italian Navy. Troops transported to and landed on Sicily were not provided with close air cover since the US Army Air Force (AAF) and Royal Air Force (RAF) leadership felt its aircraft were better used against enemy headquarters and a dozen Sicilian airfields. This left the enemy with almost complete control of the air over the beachheads. Indomitable was hit by Italian torpedo bomber on 16 July, which put her out of action for several months in Norfolk Navy Yard for repairs and refit. Some Curtiss SOC Seagull observation seaplanes were catapulted from cruisers during the invasion to search for targets for naval gunfire but, having no fighter protection, most were shot down. Nonetheless, the landings were successful. The Allies consolidated control of Sicily. Mussolini was removed from office on 25 July and the fascist state dismantled. German troops crossed into northern Italy. The Armistice of Cassibile between Italy and the Allies was signed on 3 September 1943. From 8 September Operation Achse by Germany disarmed the Italian military

=== Allied Invasion of Salerno/Operation Avalanche ===
A week later, the Allies began what would become the long, arduous campaign north through Italy with Operation Baytown (Calabria) on 3 September and Operation Slapstick (at Taranto) and Operation Avalanche (at Salerno) on 9 September troops at Salerno. In the mistaken expectation of achieving surprise through a night assault, the Allies made no preliminary bombardment of entrenched German positions. When bombardment began providing close support for the Allied troops, it came more from battleship and cruiser gunfire than from aircraft, either land-based or carrier-launched. SOC float planes launched from cruisers and Mustang fighters flying from Sicily did the spotting for the big guns. The landings were rigorously contested and costly, comparable to those later at Anzio, Tarawa, and Normandy, but success was ultimately achieved.

When it became evident that Mediterranean Air Command could not provide adequate air cover for landing troops at Salerno, (Note: The Combined Chiefs of Staff would not provide long range fighters which were required for the strategic bombing of Germany) the Royal Navy took the initiative to included four escort carriers (HMS Attacker, HMS Battler, HMS Hunter, and HMS Stalker) along with the aircraft maintenance ship acting as a light carrier HMS Unicorn to support the invasion. Carrier aircraft provided protective cover for the landings until the landing force secured enemy airfields. Once the airfields were taken, aircraft flew to them from the carriers and air cover for landing operations was then provided from those airfields. Together, there were 109 aircraft from the four escort carriers (CVEs) of Task Force 88. The plan was to have up to twenty aircraft aloft at a time. The CVE aircraft losses were high, and aircraft were flown in to replace those losses from two fleet carriers of Force H, HMS Illustrious and HMS Formidable, that maintained station further away from the action. They, too, nearly ran out of aircraft and withdrew along with the rest of Force H to Malta. This support of CVEs by CVs was the reverse of typical procedures then in use in the Pacific, where CV aircraft and pilot losses were replenished by CVEs. The usefulness of the CVE aircraft for providing air cover during landings led to the British development of "assault CVEs" to optimize them in this role.

== Allied invasions of France (1944) ==
Between June 6, 1944, and March 1945, a total of 84 Allied divisions were landed in France. Thirty-nine of these came through the Channel beaches of Normandy that had been initially assaulted on D-day. Another 28 divisions came through Channel ports secured later and 17 divisions through the South of France following landings there. With the Normandy beaches within range of land-based aircraft, aircraft carriers played only a small role in the Normandy landings. They did, however, play a larger role in the landings in Southern France.

=== Operation Overlord (June 1944) ===
The long anticipated invasion of Northern France, Operation Overlord, was the largest in history. The amphibious landings involved 1,213 combat ships and 4,000 landing vessels. Over 550,000 troops and 81,000 vehicles were brought ashore in the first ten days. German leaders were taken by surprise. Only a handful of Kriegsmarine surface ships were still active, and only a few E-boats attacked Allied vessels. Dönitz alerted 58 U-boats to interfere with the Allied landings, but none got near the invasion area. They sank only four small ships at a cost of thirteen U-boats sunk by warships or land-based bombers.

The naval elements were Operation Neptune. As a precaution against U-boat interference, the Allies stationed three escort carriers, HMS Emperor, HMS Tracker, and HMS Pursuer along with ten anti-submarine escort groups about 130 miles west along the English Channel from the landing beaches. Also defending against submarines were land-based aircraft from Britain.

Buildup of Allied troop strength in France continued after the initial landings. By late August, over two million Allied troops and 440,000 vehicles had been transported across the English Channel to France. From June through December following D-Day, over one million more Americans were transported across the Atlantic in 111 convoys, protected by escorts. In the Atlantic Theater for D-day, the Allies had eight fleet and light carriers afloat, of which four were operational. They also had 46 escort carriers afloat, of which 32 were operational.

=== Operation Dragoon (invasion of southern France, August 1944) ===
Two months after the Allies landed forces in Northern France, a separate amphibious assault began in Southern France. Operation Dragoon was launched to secure Marseille and Toulon as additional ports for supplying Allied troops in France and to protect the southern flank of General Patton's US Third Army that was to move rapidly eastward toward Germany. (Note: General Eisenhower insisted on landing in southern France principally for military reasons. Prime Minister Churchill wanted to land forces at Trieste for political reasons, hoping to occupy more of Eastern Europe thereby reducing the area that Russia would occupy when the war ended. Historians disagree on the viability of Churchill's plan. (See Morison p. 411-412))

Task Force 88 was made up of 880 ships, from large warships to landing craft, were involved. British, French, and American battleships, (Note: USS Nevada.) bombarded the coast in preparation for landing. Air cover was provided from seven British and two American escort carriers with 200 aircraft. They were HMS Attacker, HMS Emperor, HMS Khedive, HMS Pursuer, HMS Searcher, HMS Hunter, HMS Stalker, USS Tulagi, and USS Kasaan Bay. That these carriers operated off shore of the landing beaches for two weeks without experiencing a single submarine attack is an indication of the effectiveness of Allied anti-submarine activities then in effect in the Mediterranean.

A total of almost 3,500 planes, mostly land-based on Corsica and Sardinia, supported the invasion. Targets included inland airports, railroads, and communication lines. Naval bombardment softening up coastal defenses prior to troop landings were supplemented by 1,300 land-based bombers. Four hundred Allied planes dropped paratroopers behind the defender's lines.

The primary mission for the carrier-launched aircraft was to spot for naval gunfire. They also bombed German troops as they retreated.

Following the successful landings, which included the Free French Army liberating Toulon and Marseille, convoys from Italy, Corsica, North Africa and America were needed quickly to support the troops advance.
