= Vaba =

Vaba may refer to –

== Newspapers ==
- Vaba Maa, an Estonian newspaper of the 1920s
- Vaba Eesti Sõna, an American Estonian expat newspaper established in 1949

== Ships ==
- SS Vaba, and American cargo ship/tanker in service 1920–29
