= USCGC Sebago (1930) =

1930 Lake-class cutter and Banff-class sloop

Coordinates: 35.7219°N 0.6897°W

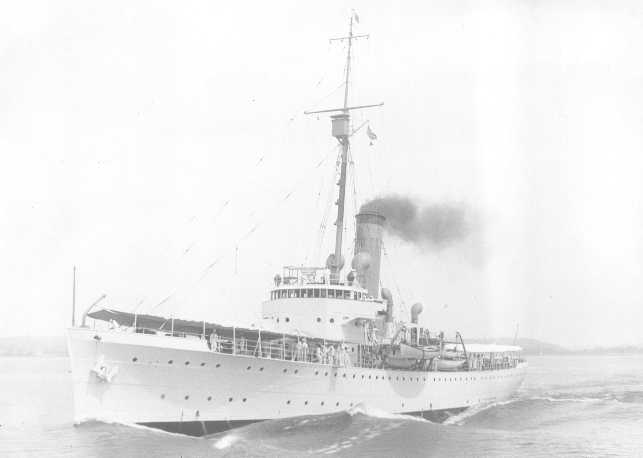
- USCGC Sebago underway, pre-World War II.

History

United States
- Name: USCGC Sebago
- Namesake: Sebago Lake
- Builder: General Engineering and Drydock Company
- Cost: $900,000
- Launched: 10 February 1930
- Commissioned: 2 September 1930
- Fate: Transferred to Royal Navy; 12 May 1941

United Kingdom
- Name: HMS Walney
- Launched: 10 February 1930
- Commissioned: 12 May 1941
- Identification: Y04
- Fate: Sunk during Operation Reservist 8 November 1942

General characteristics
- Class & type: Lake-class cutter (USCG); Banff-class sloop (RN)
- Displacement: 2,075 long tons (2,108 t)
- Length: 250 ft (76 m)
- Beam: 42 ft (13 m)
- Draft: 12 ft 11 in (3.94 m)
- Propulsion: 1 × General Electric turbine-driven 3,350 shp (2,500 kW) electric motor, 2 boilers
- Speed: 14.8 kn (27.4 km/h; 17.0 mph) cruising; 17.5 kn (32.4 km/h; 20.1 mph) maximum
- Complement: 97
- Armament: 1 × 5 inch gun; 1 × 3 inch gun; 2 × 6-pounder (57 mm)

USCGC Sebago was a Lake-class cutter belonging to the United States Coast Guard launched on 12 April 1930 and commissioned on 2 October 1930. After 11 years of service with the Coast Guard, she was transferred to the Royal Navy as part of the Lend-Lease to the Allies and became HMS Walney.

After some time on convoy escort duty, Walney was selected for Operation Reservist as part of the Allied invasion of French North Africa. Walney, together with Hartland were to break into Oran harbour and land troops that would take control of key facilities before they could be destroyed. She got into the harbour but was hit repeatedly by French guns. She was just able to reach the jetty and land the few survivors, but they were subsequently captured; Walney then sank. Her captain, Frederick Thornton Peters was awarded the Victoria Cross "for valour in taking H.M.S. Walney, in an enterprise of desperate hazard into the harbour of Oran...", and the United States Army's Distinguished Service Cross for the same actions.

== Career ==
=== Commissioning and transfer ===
She was originally the United States Coast Guard Cutter Sebago, a 250-foot Lake-class cutter. She was commissioned into Coast Guard service on 2 September 1930, originally serving in New York and participating in several Coast Guard Academy cadet cruises before being reassigned to Norfolk, Virginia. She was renamed HMS Walney when commissioned into the Royal Navy on 12 May 1941 under the Lend-Lease Agreement.

=== With the convoys ===
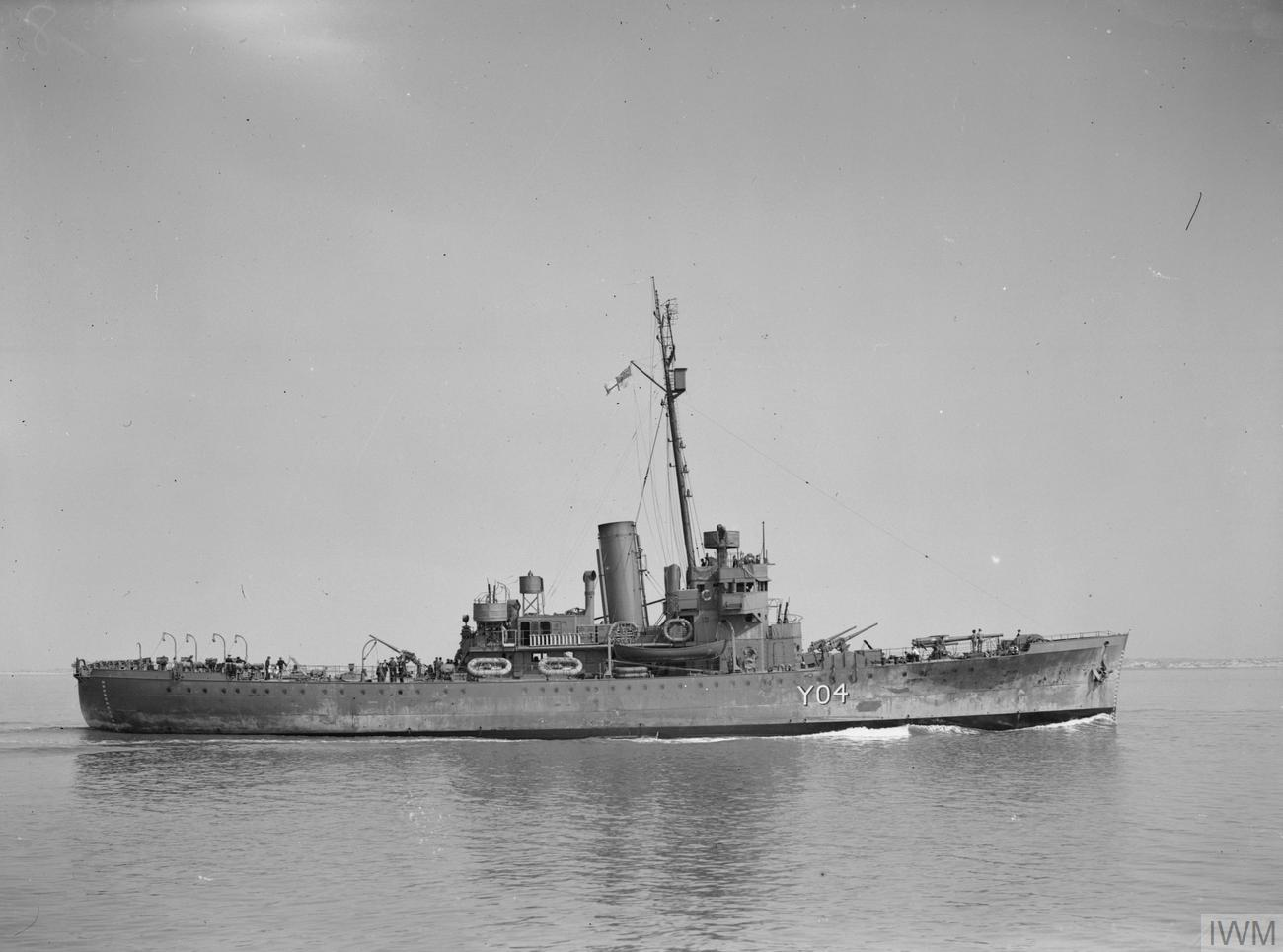
Sebago in service as HMS Walney.

Walney joined the Londonderry Sloop Division in June, and was assigned to escort the passage of the Atlantic convoys. In July she was deployed in the Western Approaches and on 24 July was deployed as part of the escort for a convoy from St. John's, Newfoundland to the United Kingdom. On 14 August Walney put into a Liverpool shipyard to undergo modifications to fit her for service as an escort. She returned to the Western Approaches on 9 September and was transferred to the 41st Escort Group to help defend convoys between the United Kingdom and West Africa. Her first deployment came a few days later on 12 September, when she was deployed as an escort for Convoy OS-6, consisting of 29 merchants on passage to Bathurst, Gambia. Walney was detached during the convoy's passage through the Atlantic, and joined HMS Hartland in escorting the merged convoys SL-88 from Freetown and HG-74 from Gibraltar to Liverpool. This joint convoy comprised 37 ships. She was detached from this convoy on 18 October and sailed to Belfast. She arrived on 20 October and underwent a refit. On its completion on 31 October, Walney rejoined the 41st Group.

Walney deployed again with Hartland on 7 November, when they escorted the 41 merchants of convoy OS-11 on their passage to Bathurst. They were detached on arrival and sailed to Freetown. By 30 November they were escorting the 29 merchants of convoy SL-94 from Freetown to Liverpool. Again, after arriving in the UK on 20 December, Walney sailed for Belfast. She arrived two days later on 22 December and underwent another refit, this time involving the fitting of Huff-Duff equipment. She deployed again on 4 January, rejoining the Western Approaches Command. The following day she departed as an escort to Bathurst for the 56 merchants of convoy OS-16, and on arrival sailed to Freetown and together with Hartland departed on 27 January escorting the 26 merchants of convoy SL-99 to the UK. Arriving on 16 February, she was under repair at Belfast from 17 February and resumed convoy escort duties on 26 February.

On 3 March Walney was involved in a minor collision with the SS Empire Dolphin. The Walney was damaged above the waterline, but remained operational. She deployed the next day with the Hartland as an escort for the 54 merchants of convoy OS-21 on passage from West Africa to Liverpool. She was detached after the arrival of the local escort at Freetown, and the two sloops escorted the 30 merchants of convoy SL-104 to Liverpool. They arrived on 12 April, with Walney being detached to sail to Chatham Dockyard. She was under refit there from 20 April, which lasted until 10 July. On the completion of refit trials she rejoined the 41st Group at Londonderry. She was then assigned to escort the 40 merchants of convoy OS-32 to West Africa from Liverpool. She was detached at Freetown on 8 July, and again with Hartland, escorted the 33 merchants of convoy SL-116 back to the UK. Again with Hartland she escorted convoy OS-38 to Africa, followed by the returning SL-122 back to Liverpool, arriving on 6 October. During Walney's deployment, no merchants had been lost in transit through the Atlantic. In recognition of her efforts, Walney was awarded the battle honour "Atlantic 1941–42".

=== Special duty ===
After her arrival in Londonderry, she was nominated for special duties during the planned North African landings (Operation Torch). From 13 October she was prepared for the task of breaking into Oran harbour. She sailed from the Clyde on 26 October, in company of the Hartland, as part of the escort for the military convoy MKF-1 to Gibraltar. On arrival in November, the two sloops embarked troops to carry out a landing inside the harbour (Operation Reservist). Walney carried 200 men of the 6th US Armoured Infantry Division, a 35-strong US Naval contingent under the command of Lt.Cdr. George Deane Dickey U.S.N., and 6 US Marines. The operation began on 8 November, but soon ran into trouble. The Walney, leading the Hartland into the harbour, came under heavy fire from French shore defences and warships. She rammed the outer boom and then the inner one but was sunk. On board Walney at the time were 200 men of the American 2nd Battalion 6th Armored Infantry Regiment and a 35-strong US Naval contingent, with six US Marines. The Walney was struck repeatedly by shells from the French sloop La Surprise, setting the Walney on fire and - after reaching the jetty - causing her finally to capsize. Only fourteen of her crew and six members of the landing parties survived. 81 of her crew and most of the troops being carried went down with the ship.

== See also ==
- List of United States Coast Guard cutters
