= Frederic Thornton Peters =

Royal Navy officer & VC (1889-1942)

Frederic Thornton Peters VC DSC DSO
- Frederic Thornton Peters
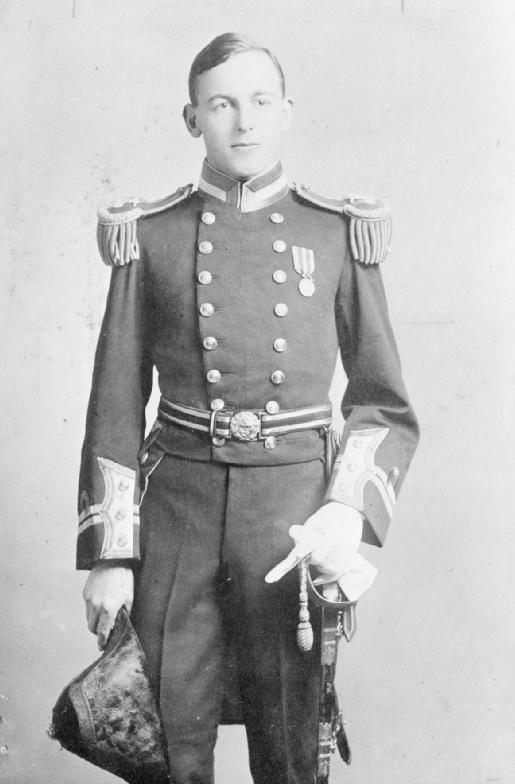
- Peters, c. 1910s
- Born: 17 September 1889; Charlottetown, Prince Edward Island, Canada
- Died: 13 November 1942 (aged 53) near HMNB Devonport, Plymouth Sound
- Military career
- Allegiance: United Kingdom
- Branch: Royal Navy; British Naval Intelligence; Secret Intelligence Service
- Service years: 1905–1942
- Rank: Acting Captain
- Units: Section for Destruction
- Commands: HMS Walney; Brickendonbury; HMS Tynwald
- Conflicts: First World War; Battle of Dogger Bank; Second World War; Operation Torch; Operation Reservist
- Awards: Victoria Cross; Distinguished Service Order; Distinguished Service Cross & Bar; Mentioned in Despatches; Distinguished Service Cross (United States)

Acting Captain Frederic Thornton "Fritz" Peters (usually misspelled with the letter "k" in official documents) VC, DSO, DSC & Bar (17 September 1889 – 13 November 1942) was a Canadian-born sailor in the Royal Navy and a recipient of the Victoria Cross, the highest award for valour in the face of the enemy that can be awarded to British and Commonwealth forces. He was also the first Canadian to ever win the Distinguished Service Order. In addition to his service with the Royal Navy, Fritz worked with British Naval Intelligence and the Secret Intelligence Service, and advised Prime Minister Winston Churchill.

The Soviet double agent Kim Philby, who worked for Peters at one point, wrote of him in his memoirs:

"He often took Guy and me to dinner at the Hungaria, to listen to our views on the new project. He had faraway naval eyes and a gentle smile of great charm. Against all the odds, he took a great and immediate fancy to Guy, who ruthlessly swiped the cigarettes off his desk. As will be seen, his connection with us was brief... Our trainees came to adore him."

== Early life and career ==
Peters' parents were Frederick Peters (Premier of Prince Edward Island, 1891–1897) and Roberta Hamilton Susan Gray (daughter of John Hamilton Gray, who was Premier of Prince Edward Island at the time of the Charlottetown Conference of 1864). He was educated at St. Peter's School on Prince Edward Island, at school in British Columbia and at Naval School in England. Two of Peters' brothers died in action on the Western Front during the First World War—John Francklyn Peters in April 1915 and Gerald Hamilton Peters in June 1916.

Peters entered the Royal Navy as naval cadet in 1905.

== World War I ==
Peters began the First World War as a lieutenant. As a lieutenant aboard the destroyer HMS Meteor at the Battle of Dogger Bank in January 1915, he was mentioned in dispatches and awarded the Distinguished Service Order (DSO) for his courageous efforts in saving lives after a German shell struck the ship’s engine room.

In 1918, he was further recognized with the Distinguished Service Cross (DSC) for demonstrating outstanding initiative, skill, and fearlessness during anti-submarine operations.

During the Interwar period, Peters worked mostly along the British Gold Coast manufacturing pumps to be used by midget submarines. He split his time in the interwar years between Britain, Canada and the Gold Coast.

== Second World War ==
In October 1939 Peters re-volunteered for Royal Navy service. He was made the commander of an anti-submarine flotilla of trawlers.

=== School for Destruction at Brickendonbury ===
After some success at sea, Peters was then transferred to the Secret Intelligence Service (MI6), to become the 1st Commandant of the School for Destruction (D School), which operated out of the estate grounds and manner of Brickendonbury, a vast estate in Hertfordshire. D School was designed to create and train – according to a unified British curriculum designed by Guy Burgess and Kim Philby – operators for the Section for Destruction (Section D), the paramilitary and guerrilla warfare section of the SIS. He had been hired onto the position by Laurence Grand, the Chief of Section D. Grand had read about Peters' exploits during the earlier war, and was impressed. Peters worked here as the Commandant for a little over a year, before Section D was merged with other units to become the Special Operations Executive (SOE), at which point Peters had become withdrawn from his duties. He disliked the incoming batch of students that had been brought in by the recently hired Colin Gubbins, thinking them to be loud, rude, obnoxious, and disrespectful of authority. He also greatly missed life on the sea. He was also not fond of falling under the command of Hugh Dalton, and requested a transfer back to combat duty. He was replaced as Commandant by Nobby Clarke and Leslie J. C. Wood.

After his resignation from Section D, he returned to the Navy and was placed in command of the HMS Tynwald, taking part in active anti-aircraft operations in the Pacific Theatre of Operations against the Imperial Japanese Navy.

In 1940 he was awarded a Bar to his DSC and was later appointed acting captain for special services.

=== Suicide charge at Oran ===
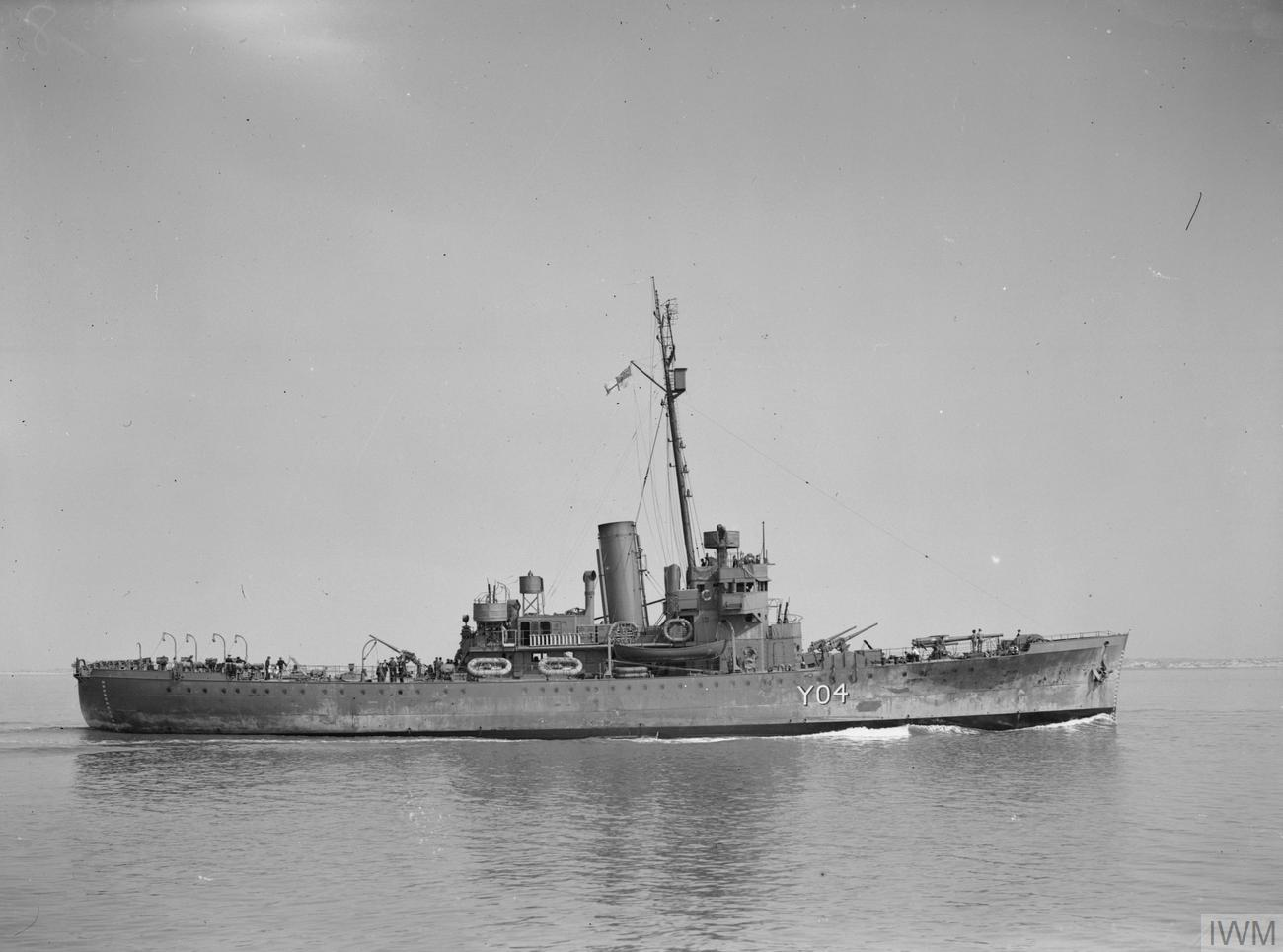
Peters commanded the HMS Walney during Operation Reservist.

When Peters was 53 years old, and an acting captain in the Royal Navy, he took part in Operation Reservist, also known as the "Suicide Charge at Oran," for which he was awarded the Victoria Cross. Operation Reservist was part of Operation Torch, the Allied landings in French North Africa. It was an attempt to capture Oran Harbour, Algeria and prevent it from being sabotaged by its French garrison. The two sloops HMS Walney and HMS Hartland were packed with British Commandos, soldiers of the 6th United States Armored Infantry Regiment and a small detachment of United States Marines.

On 8 November 1942, Captain Peters, commanding in Walney, led his force through the boom towards the jetty in the face of point-blank fire from shore batteries, the sloop La Surprise, and the destroyer Épervier. Blinded in one eye, he alone of 11 officers and men on the bridge survived. Besides him, 13 ratings survived Walney sinking. The destroyer reached the jetty disabled and ablaze and went down with her colours flying. Captain Peters and a handful of men managed to reach the shore, where they were taken prisoner. Hartland came under fire from the Typhon and blew up with the loss of half her crew. The survivors, like those of Walney, were taken prisoner as they reached shore.

Captain Peters was also awarded the United States Army's Distinguished Service Cross for the same actions. The citation, issued in Allied Force Headquarters General Orders No. 19 23 November 1942, stated that:

Captain Peters distinguished himself by extraordinary heroism against an armed enemy during the attack on that post. He remained on the bridge in command of his ship in spite of the fact that the protective armor thereon had been blown away by enemy shell fire and was thereby exposed personally to the withering cross fire from shore defenses. He accomplished the berthing of his ship, then went to the forward deck and assisted by one officer secured the forward mooring lines. He then with utter disregard of his own personal safety went to the quarter-deck and assisted in securing the aft mooring lines so that the troops on board could disembark. At that time the engine room was in flames and very shortly thereafter exploded and the ship turned on its side and sank.

The survivors were released on 10 November 1942 when the French garrison surrendered. In the meantime, the French systematically destroyed the harbour facilities at Oran: Operation Reservist was thus a complete failure.

== Death ==
Captain Peters was killed in an air crash three days after his release, on 13 November 1942. He was coming back to Britain in a Sunderland flying boat, which crash-landed in Plymouth Sound in thick fog, at the entrance to the Royal Navy's Devonport Dockyard, near Plymouth, Devon. In spite of efforts by the pilot, Flight Lieutenant Wynton Thorpe, RAAF, who held on to him for ninety minutes in the water, he was dead when the rescue launch reached them.

== Legacy ==
Mount Peters, near Nelson, British Columbia where his mother lived in her last years with the family of her daughter Helen Dewdney and her husband E.E.L. Dewdney, was named in his honour in 1946.

On February 2, 1944, a delegation of officers from the United States Military, representing President Franklin D. Roosevelt and General Dwight D. Eisenhower visited Nelson to present the United States Distinguished Service Cross posthumously to Mrs. Peters, the mother of the late Captain Peters. The formal ceremony, accompanied by a brass band of soldier musicians, took place at the Dewdney House at Stanley and Mill Streets, with the Mayor of Nelson, Norman Stibbs, and representatives of local civic organizations in attendance.

When Peters was posthumously awarded the Victoria Cross, it was sent in a standard envelope through the Royal Mail to his mother. At the time, a paperwork error was assumed – but the decision was intentionally made by the British government in order to repair diplomatic relations with the French.

A display of photos and panels on his life is on the main floor of the Daniel J. MacDonald Building in Charlottetown, Prince Edward Island. His name, along with the names of his three brothers who served in the First World War, is on memorial plaques in the St. Peter's Anglican Church in Charlottetown. In 2012, a biography by Peters' great-nephew Sam McBride, based on family letters and titled The Bravest Canadian – Fritz Peters VC: The Making of a Hero of Two World Wars, was published by Granville Island Publishing.

He has no known grave and is remembered on the Portsmouth Naval Memorial, (Panel 61. Column 3) Hampshire, England.
