= USCGC Saranac =

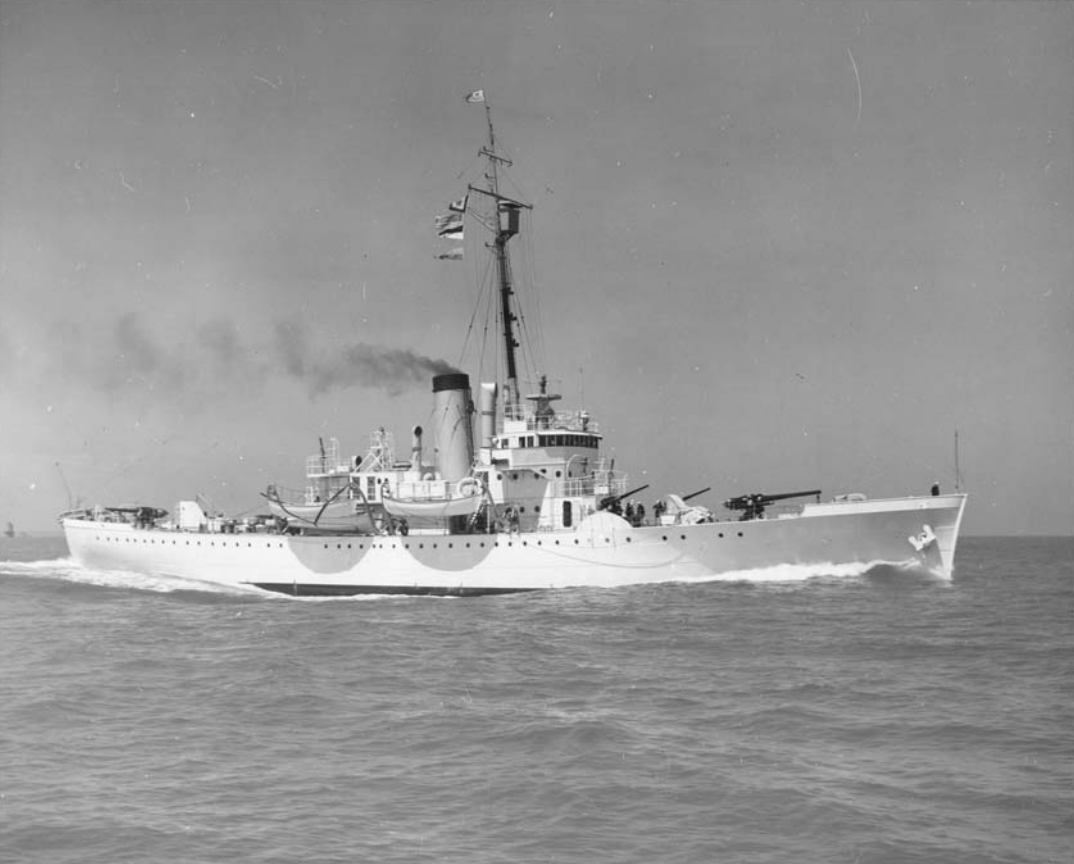
- USCGC Saranac underway

History

United States
- Name: USCGC Saranac
- Namesake: Saranac
- Builder: General Engineering and Drydock Company
- Launched: 12 Apr 1930
- Commissioned: 2 October 1930

United Kingdom
- Name: HMS Banff (Y43)
- Commissioned: 30 April 1941
- Fate: Transferred back to the USCG; 27 Feb 1946

United States
- Name: USCGC Sebec (WPG 164)
- Recommissioned: 27 May 1947
- Decommissioned: 10 August 1954
- Renamed: USCGC Tampa
- Fate: Sold on 16 February 1959

General characteristics
- Class & type: Lake-class cutter (USCG); Banff-class sloop (RN)
- Displacement: 2,075 long tons (2,108 t)
- Length: 250 ft (76 m)
- Beam: 42 ft (13 m)
- Draft: 12 ft 11 in (3.94 m)
- Propulsion: 1 × General Electric turbine-driven 3,350 shp (2,500 kW) electric motor, 2 boilers
- Speed: 14.8 kn (27.4 km/h; 17.0 mph) cruising; 17.5 kn (32.4 km/h; 20.1 mph) maximum
- Complement: 97
- Armament: 1 × 5 inch gun; 1 × 3 inch gun; 2 × 6-pounder (57 mm)

USCGC Saranac was a Lake-class cutter of the United States Coast Guard launched on 12 April 1930 and commissioned on 2 October 1930. After 11 years of service with the Coast Guard, she was transferred to the Royal Navy as part of the Lend-Lease Act.

== Career ==
=== Coast Guard – Saranac ===
After being commissioned 2 October 1930, Saranac was homeported in Galveston, Texas and participated in regular patrols.

=== Royal Navy – Banff ===
After being transferred to the Royal Navy the newly named HMS Banff (Y43) was commissioned on 30 April 1941 . On 8 August 1942, she rescued 18 people from the Norwegian tanker Mirlo which was torpedoed by U-130. On 27 February 1946 she was returned to the USCG.

=== Coast Guard – Sebec / Tampa ===
After the end of the World War II, she was transferred back to the USCG on 27 February 1946. Initially given the name Sebec (WPG 164), she was renamed Tampa before being commissioned 27 May 1947.

== See also ==
- List of United States Coast Guard cutters
