= SS Ruth Kellogg =

Tanker

History
- Name: Calaumet (1920); Vaba (1920-29); Ruth Kellogg (1929-41); Empire Dolphin (1941-47)
- Owner: United States Shipping Board (1920); Charbonneau Rajola (1920-21); United States Shipping Board (1921-23); American-Italian Steamship Co Inc (1923); Tankers Corporation (1923-24); Steamer Vaba Corporation (1924-29); Kellogg Steamship Corporation (1929-40); Ministry of War Transport (1940-45); Ministry of Transport (1945-47)
- Operator: United States Shipping Board (1920); Charbonneau Rajola (1920-21); United States Shipping Board (1921-23); American-Italian Steamship Co Inc (1923); Tankers Corporation (1923-24); Steamer Vaba Corporation (1924-29); US Tankship Corporation (1929-40); Gow, Harrison & Co Ltd (1940-47)
- Port of registry: Philadelphia, United States (1920-21); (United States) New York (1921-41); London, United Kingdom (1941-47)
- Builder: American International Shipbuilding Co
- Way number: 1540
- Launched: 1920
- Identification: United States Official Number 220781 (1920-40); United Kingdom Official Number 168179 (1940-47); Code Letters MBSN (1929-34); Code Letters KDIP (1934-40); Code Letters MNPP (1940-47)
- Fate: Scrapped

General characteristics
- Class & type: Design 1025 ship; Cargo ship (1920-21); Tanker (1921-47)
- Tonnage: 5,500 GRT (1920-21); 5,037 GRT (1921-47); 3,077 NRT (1921-47)
- Length: 390 ft 0 in (118.87 m)
- Beam: 54 ft 2 in (16.51 m)
- Depth: 27 ft 8 in (8.43 m)
- Propulsion: Steam turbine, driving a single screw propeller
- Speed: 11 knots (20 km/h)

Ruth Kellogg was a 5,037 GRT tanker that was built in 1920 as the Design 1025 Hog Islander Calaumet by American International Shipbuilding, Hog Island, Philadelphia, Pennsylvania, United States for the United States Shipping Board (USSB). Completed as Vaba, she was converted to a tanker in 1921. A sale in 1929 saw her renamed Ruth Kellogg. In 1940, she was transferred to the British Ministry of War Transport (MoWT). Renamed Empire Dolphin in 1941, she served until 1947 when she was scrapped.

== Description ==
The ship was built in 1920 by American International Shipbuilding, Hog Island, Philadelphia, Pennsylvania. She was yard number 1540.

The ship was 390 feet 0 inches (118.87 m) long, with a beam of 54 feet 2 inches (16.51 m). She had a depth of 27 feet 8 inches (8.43 m). As built, she was assessed at 5,500 GRT.

The ship was propelled by a steam turbine, driving a single screw propeller, it could propel her at 11 knots (20 km/h).

== History ==
Calaumet was launched in 1920, and completed that year as the cargo ship Vaba for the USSB. Allocated the United States Official Number 220781, She was operated by Charbonneau Rajola Corporation, New York, until 1921 and then returned to the USSB, which had her converted to a tanker by the Curtis Bay Copper & Iron Works, Curtis Bay, Baltimore, Maryland. She was assessed as 5,037 GRT, 3,077 NRT after conversion. In 1923, she was sold to the American-Italian Steamship Co Inc, New York and then resold to Tankers Corporation, New York later that year. In 1924, Vaba was sold to the Steamship Vaba Corporation, New York. She was sold to the Kellogg Steamship Corporation, New York in 1929, and renamed Ruth Kellogg. The Code Letters MBSN were allocated. She was placed under the management of the US Tankship Corporation, New York. On 8 May 1931, Ruth Kellogg caught fire 250 nautical miles (460 km) south of Cape Hatteras, North Carolina, United States. The John D. Archbold stood by, ready to assist if needed. The fire was extinguished the next day, and Ruth Kellogg proceeded to New York, arriving on 11 May. With the reallocation of Code Letters in 1934, Ruth Kellog was allocated KDIP. In January 1935, Ruth Kellogg was reported to have come ashore and subsequently refloated, arriving at Baltimore, Maryland on 18 January. In May 1935, she was reported to have come ashore at Philadelphia, Pennsylvania, but was refloated undamaged with the assistance of a tug.

In 1940, Ruth Kellogg was sold to the MoWT. She was placed under the management of Gow, Harrison & Co Ltd. The United Kingdom Official Number 168179 and Code Letters MNPP were allocated. She departed from Curaçao, Netherlands Antilles on 11 May for Kingston, Jamaica, arriving three days later and sailing the same day for Bermuda, where she arrived on 20 May. She was a member of Convoy BHX 45, which departed from Bermuda on 20 May and joined Convoy HX 45 on 29 May. HX 45 had departed from Halifax, Nova Scotia, Canada on 24 May and arrived at Liverpool on 8 June. Ruth Kellogg was carrying fuel oil, and was bound for Brest, France, where she arrived on 7 June. She departed two days later for Barry, Glamorgan, where she arrived on 30 June. Departing three days later, she arrived at the Clyde on 4 July.

Ruth Kellogg was renamed Empire Dolphin in 1941. She apparently spent the war years in home waters, although there are several large gaps in the records of her movements. On 2 March 1942, she was involved in a minor collision with HMS Walney, which was holed above the waterline but remained operational. She served until 1947, when she was scrapped at Briton Ferry, West Glamorgan.
