= Losses during the Battle of the Atlantic =

The following is a table of Allied shipping losses in the Battle of the Atlantic during World War II. All shipping losses are in Gross Registered Tonnage (GRT).

Month, year	Imports to Allies	Sunk by U-boat	Sunk by aircraft	Sunk by warship or raider	Sunk by mines	Total Allied shipping sunk	German submarines lost
Sep. '39	3297070	153879	0	5051	29537	158930	2
Oct. '39	3576135	134807	0	32058	29490	166865	5
Nov. '39	4408689	51589	0	1722	120958	53311	1
Dec. '39	4466664	80881	2949	22506	82712	106336	1
Jan. '40	4847044	111263	23693	0	77116	134956	1
Feb. '40	4348820	169566	853	1761	54740	172180	6
Mar. '40	4970525	62781	8694	0	35051	71475	1
Apr. '40	5336917	32467	13409	5358	19799	51083	5
May '40	5362873	55580	158348	6893	47716	220127	1
Jun. '40		284113	105193	61857	86087		0
Jul. '40		195825	70193	80796	33598		2
Aug. '40		267618	53283	63350	11433		3
Sep. '40		295335	56328	96288	8269		1
Oct. '40		352407	8752	32134	32548		1
Nov. '40		146613	66438	123671	46672		2
Dec. '40		212590	14890	55728	54331		0
Jan. '41	2651399	126782	78597	80796	17107	302601	0
Feb. '41	2621795	196783	89305	89096	16507	372205	0
Mar. '41	2864121	243020	113314	138906	23585	474879	5
Apr. '41	2620531	249375	323454	91579	24888	616469	2
May '41	3466204	325492	146302	15002	23194	486796	1
Jun. '41	3594684	310143	61414	17759	15326	389316	4
Jul. '41	3765724	94209	9275	5792	8583	109276	0
Aug. '41	4002450	80310	23862	24897	1400	125550	4
Sep. '41	4267134	202820	40812	22910	14948	259866	2
Oct. '41	4203224	156554	35222	3305	19737	191776	2
Nov. '41	3336789	62196	23015	17715	1714	85211	5
Dec. '41	3735419	124070	72850	6661	63853	203581	10
Jan. '42		327357	57086	3275	10079		3
Feb. '42		476451	133746	0	7242		2
Mar. '42		537980	55706	25614	16862		6
Apr. '42		431664	82924	131188	15002		3
May. '42		607247	59041	19363	18795		4
Jun. '42		700235	54769	48474	19936		3
Jul. '42		476065	74313	54358	8905		11
Aug. '42		544410	60532	50516	0		9
Sep. '42		485413	57526	24388	0		10
Oct. '42		619417	5686	7576	5157		16
Nov. '42		729160	53868	19178	992		13
Dec. '42		330816	4853	12312	1618		4
Jan. '43		203128	25503	7040	18475		6
Feb. '43		359328	75	4858	34153		19
Mar. '43		627377	65128	0	884		15
Apr. '43		327943	3034	1742	11961		15
May. '43		264853	20942	0	1568		41
Jun. '43		97753	6083	17655	4334		17
Jul. '43		242145	106005	7176	72		37
Aug. '43		86579	14133	0	19		25
Sep. '43		118841	22905	9977	4396		10
Oct. '43		97407	22680	0	19774		26
Nov. '43		66585	62452	8538	6666		19
Dec. '43		86967	75471	0	6086		8
Jan. '44		92278	24237	6420	7176		16
Feb. '44		92923	21616	2085	0		20
Mar. '44		142944	0	7840	7176		25
Apr. '44		62149	19755	0	0		21
May. '44		24424	2873	0	0		24
Jun. '44		57875	9008	1812	24654		25
Jul. '44		63351	0	7219	8114		24
Aug. '44		98729	0	7176	7194		35
Sep. '44		43368	0	0	1437		22
Oct. '44		7176	0	0	4492		13
Nov. '44		29592	7247	1141	0		8
Dec. '44		58518	35920	0	35612		15
Jan. '45		56988	7176	2365	16368		14
Feb. '45		65233	7177	3899	18076		21
Mar. '45		65077	0	3968	36064		33
Apr. '45		72439	22822	0	8733		53
May. '45		11439	7176	0	0		35

Total losses by U-boats: 14,668,785
