= Operation Reservist =

1942 Allied military operation during the Second World War

Coordinates: 35°41′28″N 0°38′30″W

- Part of Operation Torch of the Second World War
- Operation Reservist (Algeria)
Date	8 November 1942
Location	Oran, Algeria
Result	Vichy French victory

Belligerents
United Kingdom; United States	Vichy France

Commanders and leaders
(United Kingdom) Frederick Peters (surrendered) (United States) George F. Marshall †	(Vichy France) André Rioult

Strength
393 landing troops 2 sloops	4,000 soldiers 31 warships

Casualties and losses
United States: 194 killed 164 wounded United Kingdom: 113 killed 86 wounded 2 sloops destroyed	165 killed

Operation Reservist, also known as the Suicide Charge at Oran, was an Allied military operation during the Second World War. Part of Operation Torch (the Allied invasion of North Africa), it was an attempted landing of troops directly into the harbour at Oran in Algeria.

== Background ==
The purpose of Operation Reservist was to capture the valuable facilities and ships at the Vichy French port of Oran before they could be destroyed. The landing of troops directly from ships was extremely risky; however it was hoped that either the French defenders would be taken entirely by surprise, or that they would actually co-operate with the landing forces. Two Banff-class sloops, HMS Walney and HMS Hartland were used to land the troops.

== The operation ==
The landing ships came under sustained fire from the defenders once they were inside the harbour boom, including four shore batteries (from east to west – Mole Ravin Blanc, Mole Miller and, Mole J. Giraud and Mole Centre). There were 31 French ships in the port which did considerable damage to the Allied vessels. Casualties during Operation Reservist exceeded 90 percent of the Allied force. Of the 393 American infantrymen of the 3rd Battalion, 6th Armored Infantry Regiment, 189 were killed and 157 wounded. The Royal Navy suffered 113 dead and 86 wounded. A small US Navy team assigned as anti-sabotage was also involved, with five killed and seven wounded. Walney made it alongside the jetty and succeeded in landing a small number of men. The survivors were captured.

The defenders surrendered two days after the invasion, but the harbour facilities had been destroyed.

Landings were carried out at the same time to invest Oran at three different beaches. A similar operation took place at Algiers, codenamed Operation Terminal and included another coup de main in its harbor and an airborne operation to seize nearby airfields.

== See also ==
- Frederick Thornton Peters
- HMS Walney (Y04)
- HMS Hartland

== Bibliography ==
- Rick Atkinson, An Army at Dawn. Henry Holt and Company, LLC, 2002 (ISBN 0-8050-7448-1)
- Stephen Roskill The War at Sea Vol II (1956) ISBN (none)
