= Banff-class sloop =

1928 class of American sloops-of-war

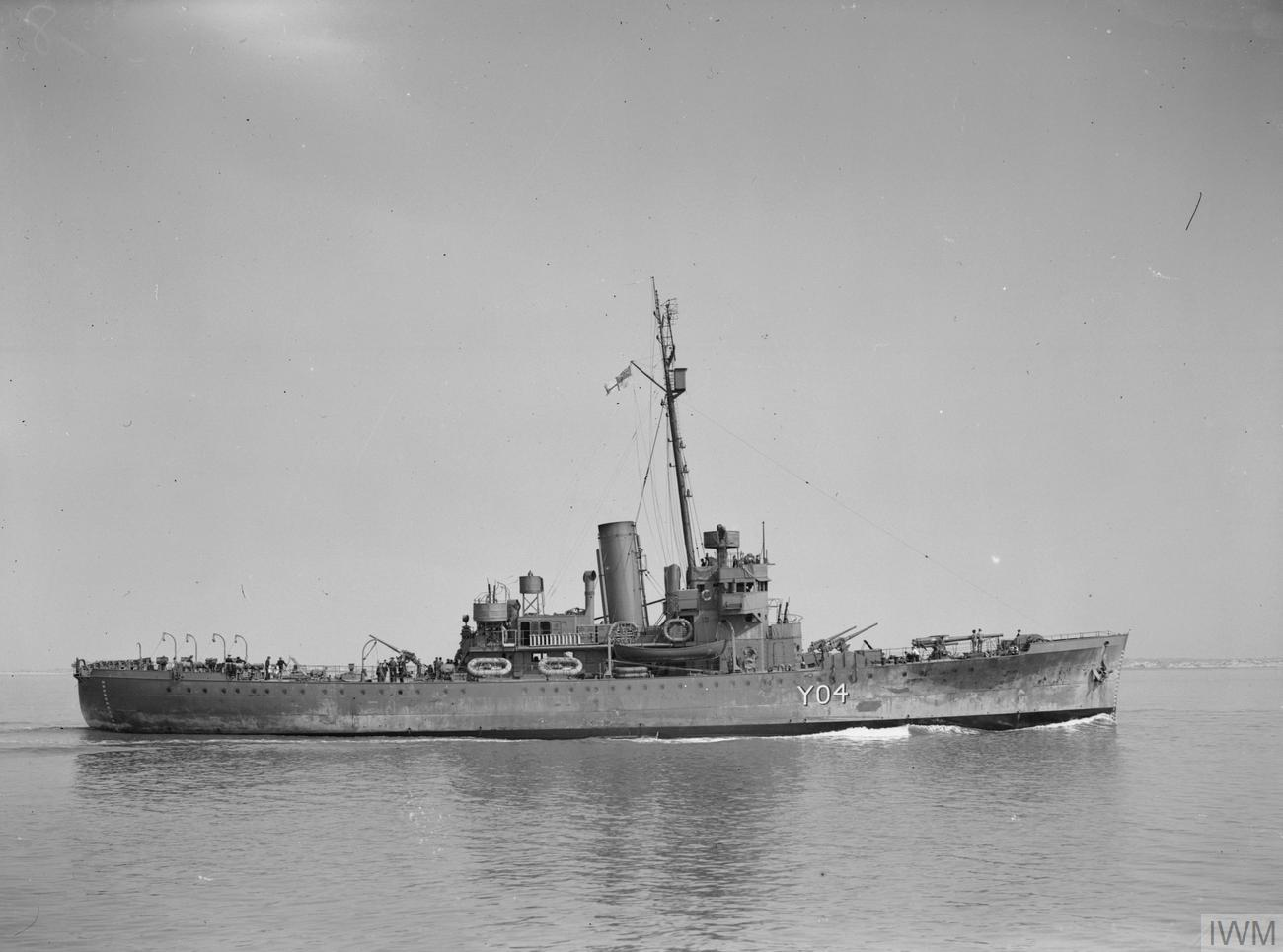
- HMS Walney

Class overview
- Builders: Bethlehem Shipbuilding Corporation; Fore River Shipyard, MA (5); General Engineering , CA (4); United Shipyards, NY (1)
- Operators: United States Coast Guard; Royal Navy
- Preceded by: Active class (US); Black Swan class (UK)
- Succeeded by: Thetis class (US); None (UK)
- Built: 1927–1932
- In commission: 1928–1954
- Completed: 10
- Lost: 3
- Scrapped: 7

General characteristics (Banff-class sloop)
- Type: Sloop
- Displacement: 1,546 long tons (1,571 t; 1,732 short tons)
- Length: 250 ft (76.20 m) o/a
- Beam: 42 ft (12.80 m)
- Draught: 16 ft (4.88 m)
- Propulsion: Two oil-fueled Babcock & Wilcox boilers; Curtis turbine generator; Single shaft electric motor; 3,200 ihp (2,400 kW)
- Speed: 16 knots (29.6 km/h)
- Range: 7,542 nautical miles (13,968 km) at 12 knots (22.2 km/h)
- Complement: 97 USCG – 200 RN
- Armament: As built; 1 × 5"/51 caliber gun; 1 × 3"/50 caliber gun; 2 × 6-pounder (57 mm); As Lake class cutter; 2 × 5"/51 caliber guns; 3 × 3"/50 caliber guns; 2 × 6-pounder (57 mm); As Banff class sloop; 1 × 5"/51 caliber gun; 2 × 3"/50 caliber guns; 4 × Oerlikon 20 mm cannon; 4 × .303" (twin)

The Banff-class sloop was a group of ten warships of the Royal Navy. Built as United States Coast Guard Lake-class cutters, in 1941 these ships were loaned to the Royal Navy as antisubmarine warfare escort ships. The transfers took place at the Brooklyn Navy Yard; the sloops were manned for transport to Britain by personnel from the damaged battleship Malaya which was under repair there.

The sloops were initially part of Western Approaches command used to escort convoys such as SL convoys from Sierra Leone to Liverpool, and one, HMS Culver, was sunk by a German submarine in the Atlantic while so employed January 1942.

In 1943, the nine surviving sloops were assigned to Operation Torch—the Allied invasion of French North Africa. Two—Walney and Hartland—were destroyed in Operation Reservist in the assault to capture Oran harbor. The remaining seven escorted Mediterranean convoys in support of the North African invasion and saw varied employment in the Atlantic until assigned to the Kilindini Escort Force in late 1943 and early 1944. They stayed in the Indian Ocean for the remainder of the war escorting trade convoys in the Arabian Sea, and five served in the Bay of Bengal supporting Operation Dracula and Operation Zipper in the last months of conflict with Japan. Six were returned to the United States after the conclusion of hostilities; and one, disabled by mechanical failure, was scrapped overseas.

== Ships ==
=== Lulworth (ex-Chelan) ===
Originally cutter #45, she was named for Lake Chelan, built by Bethlehem Shipbuilding in Massachusetts, and launched on 19 May 1928. She became HMS Lulworth on 2 May 1941 and sailed to England with convoy SC 31. After refit at Cardiff, Lulworth escorted convoys OS 4, SL 87, OS 10, and SL 93. While escorting convoy OS 10 on 31 October 1941, Lulworth attacked U-96. Lothar-Günther Buchheim, author of 1973 book Das Boot (later made into a film by the same name), was aboard U-96 at the time. Following installation of HF/DF in December 1941, Lulworth escorted convoys OS 15, SL 98, OS 20, SL 103, OS 25, SL 109, OS 31, and SL 115. Lulworth was assigned to Operation Torch following repair of damage sustained while ramming and sinking the Italian submarine Pietro Calvi on 14 July 1942 while defending convoy SL 115. Lulworth then escorted convoys KMS 8G, MKS 7, HX229A, ONS 3, SC 128, ONS 9, SC 132, ON 189, and HX 244 with the 40th Escort Group. After refit at Cardiff, Lulworth went to the Indian Ocean and unsuccessfully depth charged Japanese submarine I-37 on 16 March 1944 while escorting trade convoys with the Kilindini Escort Force. After refit at Durban, Lulworth escorted invasion convoys for Operation Dracula at Rangoon and Operation Zipper. Lulworth was returned to the United States on 12 February 1946, used for spare parts and scrapped in 1947.

=== Hartland (ex-Pontchartrain) ===
Originally cutter #46, she was named for Lake Pontchartrain, built by Bethlehem Shipbuilding in Quincy, Massachusetts, and launched on 16 June 1928. She became HMS Hartland on 30 April 1941. Following installation of Type 271 Radar, Hartland escorted convoys OS 5, SL 88, OS 11, SL 94, OS 17, SL 99, OS 21, SL 104, OS 26, SL 110, OS 38, and SL 122. Hartland sailed with Operation Torch invasion convoy KMF 1. She was abandoned and sank on 8 November 1942 following a magazine explosion after sustaining heavy damage from coastal artillery and the French destroyer Typhon during the Operation Reservist attack on Oran harbour.

=== Fishguard (ex-Tahoe) ===
Originally cutter #47, she was named for Lake Tahoe, built by Bethlehem Shipbuilding in Massachusetts, and launched on 12 June 1928. She became HMS Fishguard, named after the Welsh town of Fishguard, on 30 April 1941 and sailed to England with convoy HX 125. After refit in London, Fishguard was assigned to the 44th Escort Group. Fishguard escorted convoys OS 3, SL 86, OS 9, SL 92, OS 14, and SL 97 before HF/DF was installed in early 1942, and then escorted convoys OS 19, SL 102, OS 24, SL 108, OS 30, SL 114, OS 36, and SL 120. Refit at Falmouth included installation of Type 271 Radar and replacement of the American 5-inch/51 caliber gun by a Royal Navy 4-inch gun. Fishguard continued service with the 44th Escort Group on convoys KMF 6, MKF 6, KMF 8, MKF 8, KMF 10A, MKF 10A, KMS 12G, MKS 11, ON 182, and HX 240. Fishguard was then assigned to the convoys for the invasion of Sicily Operation Husky followed by a trip to Chesapeake Bay with convoys GUS 10X and UT 1 prior to refit. Fishguard went to the Indian Ocean after refit at Cardiff, spent 1944 with the Kilindini Escort Force, and finished the war assigned to Operation Zipper after refit at Durban from November 1944 through March 1945. She was returned to the United States on 27 March 1946, used for spare parts, and scrapped in 1947.

=== Sennen (ex-Champlain) ===
Originally cutter #48, she was named for Lake Champlain, built by Bethlehem Shipbuilding in Massachusetts, and launched on 11 October 1928. She became HMS Sennen on 12 May 1941. She sailed to England with convoy HX 128 and was assigned to the 42nd Escort Group after refit on the River Thames. She escorted convoys WS 11, SL 89, OS 12, SL 95, OS 17, SL 100, OS 22, and SL 106 prior to installation of Type 271 Radar during refit on the River Hull. Sennen escorted convoys OS 39 and SL 123 with the 45th Escort Group before assignment to Operation Torch. After the invasion of North Africa, Sennen escorted convoys OS 43 and SL 127 prior to assignment to the 1st Support Group during the battles for convoys ONS 4, ONS 5, and SC 130. Sennen was credited with sinking U-954 while defending the latter convoy on 19 May 1943. Admiral Karl Dönitz's son Peter Dönitz was among those lost aboard U-954. After refit at Grimsby, Sennen sailed with convoy KMS 26 to join the Indian Ocean Kilindini Escort Force from 26 October 1943 until refit at Durban in November 1944. Following completion of refit in March 1945, Sennen was assigned to Operation Zipper for the remainder of the war and returned to the United States on 27 March 1946. She was redesignated USCGC Champlain until scrapped in 1948.

=== Culver (ex-Mendota) ===
Originally cutter #49, she was named for Lake Mendota, built by Bethlehem Shipbuilding in Massachusetts, and launched on 27 November 1928. She became HMS Culver on 30 April 1941. Culver sailed to England with convoy HX 125 and was assigned to the 40th Escort Group. She escorted convoys OB 346 and SL 83 prior to installation of HF/DF and Type 271 Radar during refit at Woolwich. Culver escorted convoys OS 10, SL 93, OS 15, and SL 98 after refit. While escorting the latter convoy, she was hit by two torpedoes fired by U-105 on 31 January 1942 and sank southwest of Ireland following a magazine explosion. Only twelve of the crew survived.

=== Gorleston (ex-Itasca) ===
Originally cutter #50, she was named for Lake Itasca, built by General Engineering and Drydock at Oakland, California, and launched on 16 November 1929. On transfer to the RN she became HMS Gorleston after the East Anglian port of Gorleston on 30 May 1941. She was uniquely armed with ten .50 caliber and two 20 mm machine guns in place of the 3"/50 and four 20 mm Oerlikon AA guns carried by the remainder of the class. Her career was mostly spent on convoy escorts from West Africa and India. She was the escort leader for convoy SL 87, and escorted convoy SL 118. She was returned on 23 April 1946, redesignated USCGC Itasca and scrapped in 1950.

=== Walney (ex Sebago) ===
Originally cutter #51, she was named for Sebago Lake, built by General Engineering and Drydock at Oakland, California, and launched on 10 February 1930. She destroyed more derelicts than other ships of the class. She transferred to the RN and became HMS Walney on 12 May 1941, named after Walney Island. After service as a convoy escort she was prepared for Operation Reservist, an attack on Oran harbour that formed part of Operation Torch. After she was lost on 8 November 1942 in the assault, her captain was awarded the Victoria Cross for his part in pressing on.

=== Banff (ex-Saranac) ===
Originally cutter #52, she was named for the Saranac Lakes, built by General Engineering and Drydock at Oakland, California, and launched on 12 April 1930. She became HMS Banff on 30 April 1941 and sailed to England with convoy HX 125. After refit on the River Thames, Banff escorted convoys OS 3, SL 86, OS 9, SL 92, OS 14, and SL 97 prior to installation of HF/DF. Banff then escorted convoys OS 19, SL102, OS 30, SL 114, OS 36, and SL 120 prior to assignment to Operation Torch. Hedgehog anti-submarine mortar was installed during refit at Immingham following escort of North African invasion convoys. Banff then escorted convoys ON 182 and HX 240 prior to return to the Mediterranean for Operation Husky. After a trip to Chesapeake Bay escorting convoys GUS 10X and UT 1, Banff completed refit at HMNB Devonport and joined the Kilindini Escort Force in November 1943. After spending the remainder of the war escorting Indian Ocean convoys, she was returned to the United States on 27 February 1946 and recommissioned as USCGC Tampa in 1947. She was decommissioned in 1954 and was scrapped in 1959.

=== Landguard (ex-Shoshone) ===
Originally cutter #53, she was named for Shoshone Lake, built by General Engineering and Drydock at Oakland, California, and launched on 11 September 1930. She performed Bering Sea patrols and reported more navigation law infractions than other ships of the class. She became HMS Landguard on 20 May 1941, and was assigned to the 40th Escort Group. Landguard escorted convoys OB 346 and SL 83 prior to refit on the River Thames, and convoys OS 10, SL 93, OS 15, SL 98, OS 20, SL 103, OS 25, and SL 109 prior to refit at Grimsby. She then escorted convoys OS 37 and SL 121 prior to assignment to Operation Torch. After escorting North African invasion convoys to the Mediterranean, Landguard escorted convoys HX 229A, ONS 3, SC 128, and ON 192 with the 40th Escort Group prior to being damaged while patrolling the Bay of Biscay on 25 August 1943 by near misses during the first successful Henschel Hs 293 glide bomb attack by Dornier Do 217 bombers. When the damage was repaired, Landguard sailed with convoy KMS 26 to join the Kilindini Escort Force in September 1943. She escorted Indian Ocean convoys until disabled by a machinery failure at Colombo in March 1945. She served as a depot ship at Colombo until February 1946 and was sold there by the United States government in 1947 to be scrapped in Manila in 1949.

=== Totland (ex Cayuga) ===
Originally cutter #54, she was named for Cayuga Lake, built by United Shipyards in Mariners Harbor, Staten Island, and launched on 7 October 1931. She became HMS Totland on 12 May 1941, and sailed to England with convoy HX 128. After refit on the River Thames, Totland escorted convoys OS 4, SL 89, OS 12, SL 95, OS 17, SL 100, OS 22, SL 106, OS 28, SL 112, OS 40, and SL 124 with the 42nd Escort Group before being assigned to Operation Torch. After escorting convoys KMF 3, MKF 3, KMF 5, MKF 5, KMF 7, and MKF 7 in support of the North African invasion, Totland sank the German submarine U-522 on 23 February 1943 while escorting the tanker convoys UC 1 and CU 1. Totland then escorted convoys between Freetown and Lagos via Sekondi-Takoradi until transferred to the Kilindini Escort Force in July 1944. Totland began a prolonged refit in October 1944 until the decision to retire her in May 1945. She was returned to the United States in May 1946, recommissioned as USCGC Mocoma in 1947, decommissioned in 1950, and scrapped in 1955.
