= USCGC Pontchartrain (1928) =

Cutter

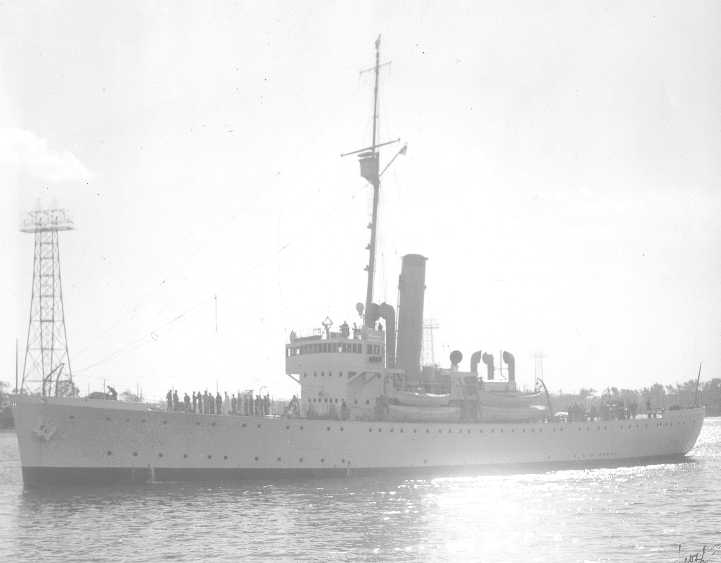
- USCGC Pontchartrain, underway, pre-World War II.

History

United States
- Name: USCGC Pontchartrain (1928)
- Namesake: Lake Pontchartrain
- Builder: Bethlehem Shipbuilding Corporation
- Laid down: 29 November 1927
- Launched: 16 June 1928
- Commissioned: 13 October 1928
- Decommissioned: 30 April 1941
- Fate: Transferred to Royal Navy, 30 April 1941

United Kingdom
- Name: HMS Hartland (Y00)
- Commissioned: 30 April 1941
- Fate: Sunk off Oran Harbour, 8 November 1942.

General characteristics
- Class & type: Lake-class cutter (USCG); Banff-class sloop (RN)
- Displacement: 2,075 long tons (2,108 t)
- Length: 250 ft (76 m)
- Beam: 42 ft (13 m)
- Draft: 12 ft 11 in (3.94 m)
- Propulsion: 1 × General Electric turbine-driven 3,350 shp (2,500 kW) electric motor, 2 boilers
- Speed: 14.8 kn (27.4 km/h; 17.0 mph) cruising; 17.5 kn (32.4 km/h; 20.1 mph) maximum
- Complement: 97
- Armament: 1 × 5 inch gun; 1 × 3 inch gun; 2 × 6-pounder (57 mm)

USCGC Pontchartrain was a Lake-class cutter belonging to the United States Coast Guard launched on 16 June 1928 and commissioned on 13 October 1928 . After 13 years of service in the Coast Guard, she was transferred to the Royal Navy as part of the Lend-Lease Act. She was sunk in 1942 off Oran Harbor.

== Career ==
=== US Coast Guard - Pontchartrain ===
After commissioning in November 1928, Pontchartrain was homeported in Norfolk, Virginia and assigned to the Bering Sea Patrol.

On 4 December 1940 Pontchartrain rescued the entire crew of the 70 foot tugboat Edwin Duke which was in danger of sinking in a storm south of Long Island.

=== Royal Navy - Hartland ===
As part of the Lend-Lease Act she was transferred to the Royal Navy where she was renamed HMS Hartland (Y00) and commissioned on 30 April 1941. In November 1942, while taking part in Operation Reservist carrying American troops to seize the harbour of Oran, Algeria, she was sunk by gunfire from the French destroyer Typhon within the Oran Harbor taking 34 crew members with her.

== See also ==
- List of United States Coast Guard cutters
