= Office of the Coordinator of Information =

Defunct US intelligence agency

Agency overview
- Formed: 11 July 1941
- Dissolved: 13 June 1942
- Superseding agency: Office of Strategic Services
- Jurisdiction: United States
- Headquarters: 30 Rockefeller Plaza, New York City, New York
- Agency executives: William J. Donovan, Coordinator of Information; Robert E. Sherwood, Deputy Director; David K. E. Bruce, Deputy Director; Millard Preston Goodfellow, Deputy Director; Garland H. Williams, Director of Training; James Phinney Baxter III, Director Research and Analysis
- World War II

The Office of the Coordinator of Information (COI) was the first civilian non-departmental intelligence agency of the federal government of the United States. It was founded on July 11, 1941, by President Franklin D. Roosevelt, prior to US involvement in the Second World War.

Directed by Wild Bill Donovan for its duration, COI was focused on intelligence and propaganda operations, as well as sabotage, guerrilla warfare, irregular warfare, and other activities. Heavily influenced by the British MI6 (and the Soviet moles planted in MI6 to create a more effective anti-Nazi machine there) and British Naval Intelligence, COI was intended to overcome the lack of coordination between existing US federal agencies which, in part, it did by duplicating some of their functions.

As the name "coordinator" implies, COI was intended to coordinate all of the efforts of the intelligence field in the United States. However, many leaders of the military, other federal agencies, and especially the FBI became opposed to Donovan, and maneuvered politically to have it dismantled. COI was dissolved one month short of a year, transformed into the Office of Strategic Services (OSS). COI, being the direct predecessor to the OSS, is considered the foundation of the Central Intelligence Agency (CIA) and the entire United States Intelligence Community (IC).

COI operated in all theatres of the war except for Latin America, which was assigned to the Special Intelligence Service of the FBI.

== Origins ==
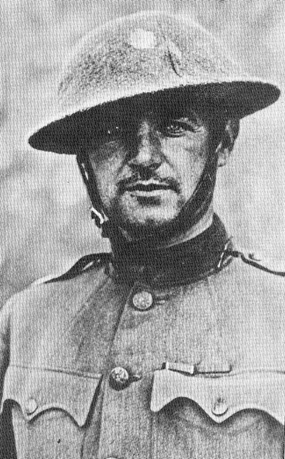
William J. Donovan was a Medal of Honor winner and veteran of World War I.

Franklin D. Roosevelt and Winston Churchill were in communication beginning in 1939, when Churchill was made the First Lord of the Admiralty, but their correspondences increased rapidly after the German invasion of Belgium and Churchill's election to Prime Minister of the United Kingdom. Roosevelt had already established communications throughout Europe to any leaders he might have thought would defy Nazi Germany. Throughout 1940, Churchill tried to relay to Roosevelt the precarious situation that the island of Great Britain faced against the Nazis, and that France was soon to fall. Roosevelt, however, informed Churchill that he could not commit anything militarily without an Act of Congress.

In May 1940, the British Secret Intelligence Service (MI6) established the British Security Co-ordination (BSC) at 30 Rockefeller Plaza in New York City. Churchill and C agreed to appoint William "Little Bill" Stephenson to run the BSC, who had been sent to the United States for over a year at that point to re-establish communications with J. Edgar Hoover. Hoover, and his Federal Bureau of Investigation (FBI) had just recently established the Special Intelligence Service (SIS). Hoover reluctantly agreed to establish SIS intelligence sharing with the BSC, but only after a direct order from Roosevelt.

To gain a clearer perspective of Britain's resolve against the German threat, and to gauge their defensive posture, Roosevelt searched for someone to send on a fact-finding mission to that country. William J. "Wild Bill" Donovan, a lawyer in private practice on Wall Street, arranged a meeting then between Stephenson, Secretary of the Navy Frank Knox, and Secretary of War Henry L. Stimson. These men searched for a reliable candidate for the mission, but none could be found. Donovan had already been traveling to Europe and Africa on intelligence fact-finding missions of this exact nature for the government on ad-hoc bases since 1929. Frank Knox recommended Donovan for the mission. Roosevelt appreciated the recommendation, as the two had been classmates at Columbia Law School.

In the summer of 1940, Roosevelt approached Donovan and asked him to travel to London, and he departed by air in June. Churchill and British intelligence were enthused to have Roosevelt showing interest. In order to convince the Americans to join the war, Churchill gave him access to most any facility he desired. Additionally, before Donovan left the United States, telegrams were cabled to England by Walter Stratton Anderson, Sherman Miles, and George C. Marshall. These telegrams were sent to Alan Goodrich Kirk and Raymond E. Lee, the US military attachés in London. They were instructed to facilitate any meetings and make any arrangements necessary for Donovan to gain a full picture of the situation.

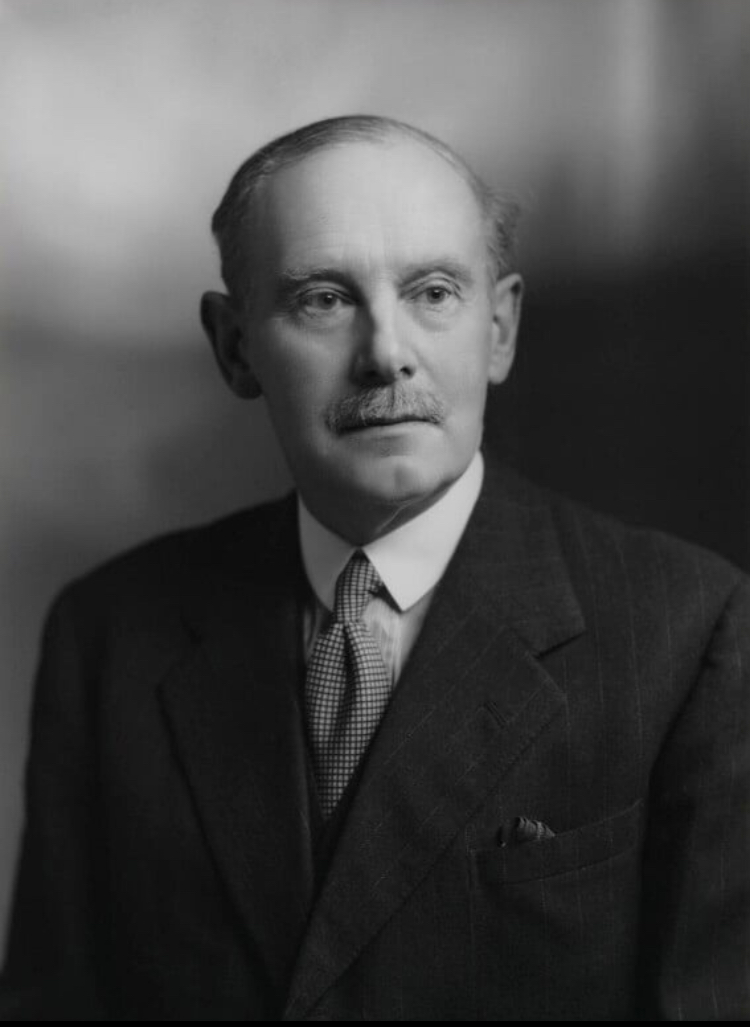
Stewart Menzies, known as C, was the Chief of the Secret Intelligence Service.

On that trip, Donovan formed professional relationships with many of the intelligence chiefs in the United Kingdom, and with the American diplomatic corps stationed at the US Embassy. He also spoke directly to the commanders of many British military bases and inspected the troops in rank formation throughout the country. He had dinner with King George V, but more importantly, he had intense meetings with Stewart Menzies, known as C.

At around the same time as Donovan's visit, the British were in the process of merging three distinct organizations known as Section D, Electra House, and MI(R) into a singular organization. That organization would be known as the Special Operations Executive (SOE), but it was still in its planning stages at the time. The people of Section D and MI(R), however, under the leadership of John Charles Francis Holland and Laurence Grand, had already been collectively on hundreds of missions throughout Europe and had developed undercover operations from Norway to Hong Kong and back again. Section D, with over 300 officers by that point, had been especially successful in establishing networks, and more importantly, an important training school in sabotage called the School for Destruction at Brickendonbury.

Returning to the United States two weeks later, Donovan delivered his report to Knox with the encouragement to aid the United Kingdom in whatever ways possible, and to consider developing a unique American brand of civilian intelligence similar to what the British had begun developing shortly before their entry into the war. Donovan met with dozens of military officials, and every political representative of the President. He met with a select few members of Congress who had known of his trip, and briefed them of his findings.

Donovan also met two men that he took back with him to the United States by the names of John Henry Godfrey and Ian Fleming, who were vital in drawing up the plans for an American intelligence operation. However, British-Australian MI6 intelligence officer Dick Ellis has also been credited with writing the blueprint for Donovan.

On the guise of a leisure trip to Hyde Park, Donovan accompanied Roosevelt and presented his findings. Roosevelt was greatly swayed by Donovan's report. Roosevelt was also persuaded by American playwright Robert Sherwood, who served as Roosevelt's primary speechwriter on foreign affairs.

== History ==
In July 1941, Roosevelt appointed Donovan as the head of the Office of the Coordinator of Information (COI). COI quickly began establishing liaisons and forward bases around the world, especially utilizing the existing intelligence sharing networks of several federal agencies such as the Federal Bureau of Narcotics (FBN) and the Secret Service.

The headquarters of COI were at 30 Rockefeller Plaza while the organization was being created – the same headquarters shared with the BSC. Hoover's SIS was also just down the street at 45 Rockefeller Plaza.

Donovan's primary interests were military intelligence and covert operations. Sherwood handled the dissemination of domestic information and foreign propaganda. He recruited the noted radio producer John Houseman, who because of his Romanian birth at the time was technically an enemy alien, to develop an overseas radio program for broadcast to the Axis powers and the populations of the territories they had conquered, which became known as the Voice of America. The first broadcast, called in German Stimmen aus Amerika ("Voices from America") aired on Feb. 1, 1942, and included the pledge: "Today, and every day from now on, we will be with you from America to talk about the war. ... The news may be good or bad for us – We will always tell you the truth."

The COI also asked Eugene Power of University Microfilm, Inc. to help them by microfilming Axis documents which had been obtained by the British in order that copies could more readily be made available in the USA.

=== Dissolution into two new agencies ===
Donovan's desire to use propaganda for tactical military purposes and Sherwood's emphasis on what later became known as public diplomacy were a continuing source of conflict between the two men. On June 13, 1942, Roosevelt split the functions and created two new agencies: the Office of Strategic Services (a predecessor of the Central Intelligence Agency), and the Office of War Information (a predecessor of the United States Information Agency).
