= John Charles Francis Holland =

British Army intelligence officer (1897-1956)

John Charles Francis Holland CB DFC LoM MoF
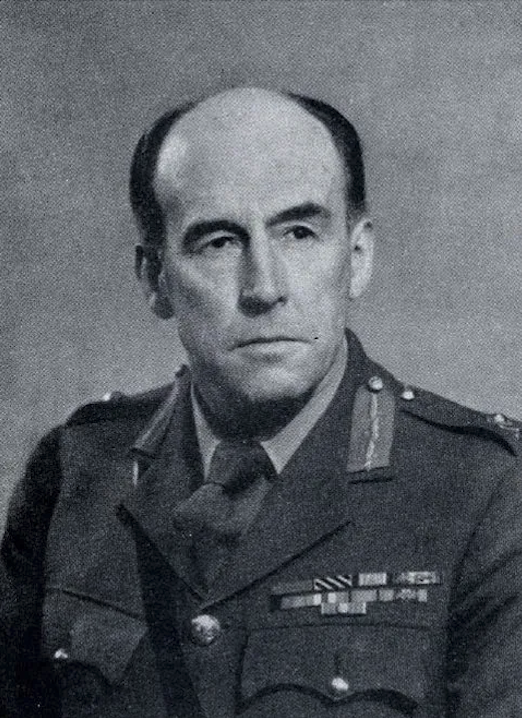

Chief of Staff, Western Command
- In office 1947–1948

Director of the Military Intelligence (Research)
- In office 1939–1940 Serving with Joan Bright Astley

2nd Director of General Staff (Research)
- In office 1938–1939 Serving with Laurence Grand

Personal details
- Born: 21 November 1897 India, British Raj
- Died: 17 March 1956 (aged 58) Wimbledon, England
- Spouse: Anne Christable
- Parent: Thomas Henry Holland
- Education: Rugby School
- Alma mater: Royal Military Academy Woolwich; Jesus College, Cambridge; Staff College at Quetta
- Awards: Distinguished Flying Cross; Legion of Merit; Medal of Freedom with Silver Palm; Companion of the Order of the Bath

Military service
- Branch/service: Royal Engineers; Royal Air Force; Directorate of Military Intelligence; War Office
- Unit: 1st Divisional Engineers Bengal Sappers and Miners
- Battles/wars: Irish War of Independence; World War I; Sinai and Palestine campaign; Macedonian front; World War II; Cold War

John Charles Francis "Jo" Holland was a British Army officer and one of the founders of the modern apparatus of irregular warfare. At the outbreak of hostilities in World War II, Holland went to work for the War Office and recruited the heads of a large swathe of the sections of the Directorate of Military Intelligence. His recruits at this time included; Colin Gubbins, Norman Crockatt, E.R. Coombe, and Gerald Templer. For the first half of the war, he was the director of the irregular warfare efforts for the War Office, managing at first an organization called GS (R), which was later the Military Intelligence (Research) Department, abbreviated as MI(R). In 1940, he was one of the creators of the Special Operations Executive (SOE), and MI(R) was then merged into the SOE. Holland went back into regimental staffs shortly after becoming the progenitor of the British Commandos.

== Biography ==
=== Early life ===
Holland was born in India during the rule of the British Raj. He was the only son and the eldest child of Thomas Henry Holland and Frances Maud. His father was a high-ranking geologist who later served as the director of the Geological Survey of India.

As a child, Holland was sent to be educated at the Rugby School, a public boarding school in England. While at this school, he formed a friendship with another young boy from India named Norman Crockatt. Another boy at Rugby was a Liverpudlian nine months younger than Holland named Laurence Grand. In 1914, Holland graduated from the Rugby School and enlisted into the Royal Military Academy, Woolwich.

=== World War I ===
On 25 July 1915, Holland was commissioned into the Royal Engineers and deployed to the Eastern Mediterranean. For most of his time during World War I, he served on the Macedonian front in Salonika. In the summer of 1918, he earned the Distinguished Flying Cross for "gallantry in action" in an operation for the Royal Air Force, an air raid on the town of Sofia.

At some point, Holland met and worked with T. E. Lawrence for a brief time in an operation against the Ottoman Empire.

=== Irish War of Independence ===
In 1919, at the end of the First World War, Holland was almost immediately deployed to respond to what were then called the "Troubles in Ireland," today known as the Irish War of Independence. His deployments to Ireland were co-mingled with his supplemental education at Jesus College at the University of Cambridge. He was a student for most of the year, but on the academic breaks, he served on deployments to Ireland. It was during the Christmas academic break of 1920 when he was severely wounded in Dublin.

Before leaving Ireland on his first tour, he had learned that an acquaintance in the Army was being targeted for assassination. After returning to England and hearing that this friend had been killed, he reportedly decided to take revenge. Traveling to Ireland during his academic leave, he waited in a pub for the suspected assassin to appear. Despite being urged by the barmaid to leave for his own safety, he remained, and a confrontation eventually occurred. During the ensuing exchange of gunfire, he was seriously wounded but managed to reach the street, where he was found by an armored car patrol and taken to a hospital.

The historian Malcolm Atkin writes:

"This may have been a semi-official Intelligence mission (not unknown in Ireland at the time), with the story as recounted in the Royal Engineers obituary being a long-surviving cover story. The incident does not appear in his service record and, despite Holland’s reputation as a raconteur, the story was never told to his family."

Despite his injury, he is noted by military historians as having grown to admire both the cause and the technical skills of his enemy, the guerrilla warfighters of the Irish Republican Army. Irregular warfare and guerrilla war became a personal and professional hobby of study for Holland at this time, and it was a hobby that he kept for the rest of his life.

=== Interwar Years ===
In 1922, his promotion to the rank of Major was held-back, and he was demoted down to Lieutenant. It took him another seven years to work his way back up to the rank of Major.

In 1924, Holland was made the Adjutant of the 1st Divisional Engineers.

In early 1928, he was posted to India and assigned to the Bengal Sappers and Miners. The following year, in July 1929, he was appointed to command the No. 1 Field Company. He greatly enjoyed his life in India, and also became an enthusiastic polo player.

In 1931, he entered the Staff College at Quetta, where he earned distinction for both his academic performance and athletic ability, and was an active participant in the Quetta Hunt. After returning to England for corps duties, he was appointed Staff Captain of the 49th (West Riding) Division, Territorial Army, and later served as a General Staff Officer, Grade 3 (GSO 3), in the Staff Duties branch at the War Office.

In October 1937, he became a GSO 2 in the S.D.7 section of the War Office, responsible for matters related to the organization and equipment of armored fighting vehicles. His creativity and analytical approach soon attracted the attention of the Vice Chief of the Imperial General Staff (VCIGS), who assigned him to lead a research section examining key operational problems. In January 1938, he was awarded the brevet rank of lieutenant colonel. With the outbreak of war in 1939, his position was elevated to that of GSO 1, giving him broader responsibilities and greater scope to apply his innovative thinking.

Between 1934 and 1936, Holland served as a Captain in the Northern Command.

=== Establishment of British Irregular Warfare unit ===
In 1938, after being passed over for promotion due to medical reasons, he accepted a position as a Grade II staff officer at the War Office, where he was permitted to conduct independent research on a topic of his choice. He selected the study of irregular warfare. His branch, initially consisting only of himself, was designated General Staff (Research), abbreviated as GS (R). Contrary to popular misconception, Holland was not the first chief of GS (R). The section had actually been established in 1936, but the section chief who created the office has not yet been identified, because GS (R)'s operations for its first two years, between 1936 and 1938, were not revealed to the public. GS (R) was only made known to the public during a session of the House of Commons in 1938.

Holland had no prior experience in intelligence work, which was representative of the improvised nature of recruitment to British Military Intelligence at the time. His appointment was initially viewed as temporary and of limited significance. Nevertheless, with the collaboration of Lieutenant Colonel Laurence Grand, head of Section D at the Secret Intelligence Service and an acquaintance from Woolwich, Holland succeeded in establishing a new area of study within the War Office devoted to irregular warfare.

Section D had been created in April 1938 within SIS to develop plans for covert sabotage and subversion through civilian channels. Holland’s parallel work at the War Office likely stemmed from a concern among senior officers that the Army should not be sidelined in this emerging field, and that the potential military application of guerrilla operations warranted systematic examination.

Drawing on his earlier experiences with guerrilla warfare in Ireland, he developed ideas that extended beyond conventional military doctrine. He sent in for nearly every book that had been written on the subject, endeavoring to produce a replicable modus operandi from historical accounts. He is known to have studied at this point T.E. Lawrence’s Seven Pillars of Wisdom, the tactics of Cossack hosts deployed in the Napoleonic Wars, the Francs-tireurs during the Battle of Sedan, guerrilla tactics used in the Second Boer War and the Anglo-Zulu War, certain recent actions in the Chinese Civil War, and the Spanish Civil War. His largest area of study, however, was that of the Irish Republican and earlier Fenian tactics and strategies. Of the Irish guerrilla movement, he wrote that: "there is little doubt that the Irish made guerrilla warfare into a science, which has been followed since... It is proposed to base this present study on such information as can be obtained of Irish principles and their application by other revolutionaries subsequently."

Holland's first official GS (R) department hire was for a Secretarial clerk typist and personal assistant named Joan Bright Astley, who would eventually become an inspiration for the fictional character Miss Moneypenny. In early 1939, his branch was restructured and renamed the Military Intelligence (Research) Department, becoming part of the Directorate of Military Intelligence. Although administratively within intelligence, his focus remained on planning and operations. With the support of General Archibald Wavell, he contributed to the creation of several wartime covert organizations and was among the early advocates for the formation of commando units.

During the summer of 1939, he worked for a brief period at 2 Caxton Street in Westminster, sharing offices with Lieutenant Colonel Laurence Grand.

=== World War II ===
When war was declared in September 1939, Holland returned to his duties at the War Office.

Holland assembled a group of officers who shared his interest in unconventional operations, assigning each to responsibilities that matched their abilities. He tasked Norman Crockatt to manage the newly established MI9. He sent E. R. Coombe to establish the Inter-Services Security Board, which coordinated matters of security, deception, and the use of code names. He placed Gerald Templer in charge of security for the British Expeditionary Force, while Millis Jefferis was directed to develop and oversee the use of experimental weapons and devices.

Holland also dispatched Colin Gubbins to the Independent Companies in Norway and later assigned him to form resistance units intended to disrupt German communications in the event of invasion. Gubbins subsequently became head of the Special Operations Executive (SOE), created in July 1940 through the merger of Holland’s section, Section D of the SIS, and the Electra House, a covert propaganda unit of the Foreign Office.

Following the establishment of the SOE, Holland returned to regimental service after receiving command as a Lieutenant Colonel. He rejoined the War Office in July 1943 as Deputy Chief Engineer with the rank of Major General.

=== Postwar life and death ===
In recognition of his wartime service, he was appointed Companion of the Order of the Bath (CB) in 1945, and was also awarded the U.S. Legion of Merit and the Medal of Freedom with Silver Palm. He later served as Chief of Staff for Western Command from 1947 to 1948, undertook further classified planning work in 1949–1950, and retired from the Army in 1951.

On 14 March 1956, Holland died at his son's house in Wimbledon.
