= Laurence Grand =

British Military Intelligence officer (1898-1975)

Laurence Grand CB CBE CIE
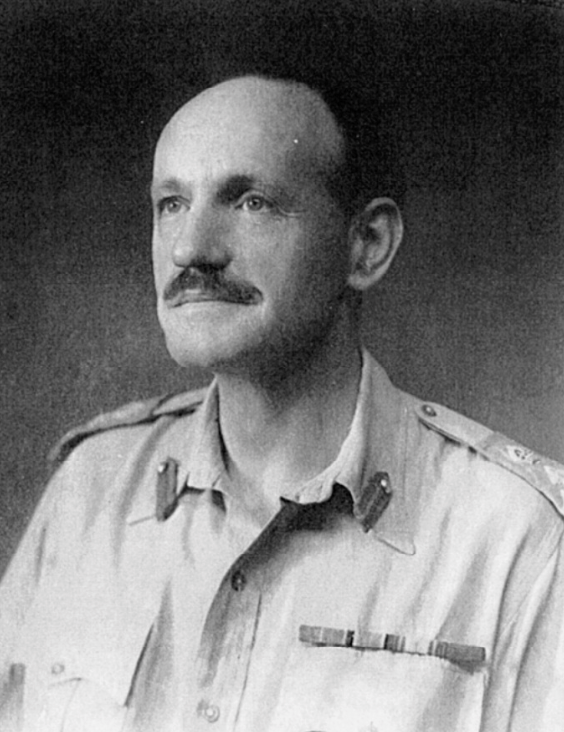

Director of Fortifications and Works for the War Office
- In office 1949–1952

Chief Engineer, Home Counties District
- In office 1946–1949

Director of Engineer Resources for General Headquarters, India
- In office 1943–1946

Director of Section D
- In office 1938–1940 Serving with John Charles Francis Holland
- Succeeded by: Frank Nelson

Personal details
- Born: 10 August 1898 Wavertree, Liverpool, England
- Died: 22 November 1975 (aged 77) Putney Hospital, London, England
- Education: Rugby School, Royal Military Academy, Woolwich; Royal School of Military Engineering
- Awards: Member of the Order of the British Empire; Commander of the Order of the British Empire; Companion of the Order of the Indian Empire; Companion of the Order of the Bath

Military service
- Branch/service: Royal Engineers; Iraq Levies; War Office; Directorate of Military Intelligence; Special Operations Executive
- Rank: Major General
- Battles/wars: Allied intervention in the Russian Civil War; North Russia intervention; World War II; European theatre of World War II; Cold War

Laurence Douglas Grand (often misspelled as Lawrence) ( August 10, 1898 – November 22, 1975) was a British military officer who served as the first head of Section D at the Secret Intelligence Service (SIS) during World War II, and was one of the co-founders of the Special Operations Executive (SOE), alongside his childhood friend and counterpart John Charles Francis Holland. Even though Grand was largely responsible for the creation of SOE, he was forced out of the unit by its new director, Hugh Dalton. After the war, one of his former colleagues, Colin Gubbins, due to the jealousy of a forced retirement, took to creating a revisionist history by downplaying Grand's contributions to the war effort.

The Soviet double agent Kim Philby wrote in his posthumous memoir:

"The head of the section was Colonel Lawrence Grand, to whom I was introduced a few days after joining his staff. Tall and lean, he looked startlingly like the dream-figure who should have approached me in Germany or Spain. The difference was that his mind was certainly not clipped. It ranged free and handsome over the whole field of his awesome responsibilities, never shrinking from an idea, however big or wild."

== Biography ==
=== Early life ===
Grand was born in a house at 7 Rose Lane, Wavertree in Liverpool. He was the oldest son of Douglas Henry Grand and Emma Gertrude Chamberlain. His father was a commission merchant. As a child, Grand was enrolled in Sixth form at the Rugby School, a public boarding school. Here, he became friends with two boys from British India named Jo Holland and Norman Crockatt. He left Rugby School in mid-1916 to spend a year at Royal Military Academy, Woolwich.

=== Early career in military service ===
On 28 September 1917, Grand was commissioned as a Second Lieutenant in the Royal Engineers. He did not see active service during World War I, continuing instead with his military studies at the School of Military Engineering in Chatham, but his operational experience began soon after. In 1919 he served briefly in northern Russia with the 384th Field Company, followed by service on the North-West Frontier of India and during the 1920 Iraqi Revolt. In 1923 he joined the Iraq Levies in Kurdistan, for which he was appointed Member of the Order of the British Empire (MBE).

Grand matriculated at Christ’s College, Cambridge, in October 1923 but never took up residence and did not earn a degree. After five years of routine regimental duty in England, he was promoted to Captain on 28 September 1928 and to major on the same date in 1937. On 6 November 1930, he married Irene Lola Hilda, the daughter of Captain Charles Theobald Mathew of the Indian Army. The couple had a son and a daughter, the latter later marrying the heir to the tenth Earl of Bessborough.

=== Section D and irregular warfare ===
In April 1938, Grand was assigned to the Secret Intelligence Service (SIS) to establish a new section, initially designated Section IX and later renamed Section D. His assignment, as described by M. R. D. Foot, was “to investigate every possibility of attacking potential enemies by means other than the operations of military force,” though he was initially prohibited from initiating any overt action. Grand wrote that “one felt as if one had been told to move the Pyramids with a pin.”

Grand set up his country headquarters at The Frythe, near Welwyn, and opened an office at 2 Caxton Street, Westminster, where he gathered a circle of acquaintances, mostly coming from the financial sectors of the City of London. According to one associate, he possessed exceptional imagination and leadership, though tangible results were limited. Among his early initiatives were sending an agent to the middle Danube to explore ways of obstructing the flow of Romanian oil to Germany, and commissioning émigré-prepared leaflets intended to weaken German support for the Nazi regime. His efforts to interfere with the export of Swedish iron to Germany were unsuccessful.

For several months in the summer of 1939, Grand worked alongside Jo Holland, who was developing similar plans for the War Office. When war broke out, Holland returned to the War Office to expand the operations of GS(R), which later became MI(R).

Grand later took over three upper floors of the St. Ermin’s Hotel adjacent to Caxton Street and expanded his section. However, the combination of urgency and secrecy often resulted in disorganization. In mid-1940, Section D’s attempts to form stay-behind units to disrupt German communications in the event of an invasion caused such confusion that the entire project was transferred to Jo Holland.

Soon after, his section, Holland’s unit, and Department EH, the propaganda branch of the Foreign Office were merged to create the Special Operations Executive (SOE). Grand himself was excluded from the new organization after an irreparable falling-out with his superior, Hugh Dalton, who considered him disloyal and even dishonest. As a result, Grand was returned to the army in September 1940, on the condition that he be posted overseas immediately.

=== Posting to India ===
Grand was posted to India, where he returned to professional engineering duties. Promoted to Commander of the Order of the British Empire (CBE) in 1943, he was appointed Director of Engineer Resources at General Headquarters, India. He remained in India for the rest of the war.

=== Postwar years and death ===
In 1946 he was made Companion of the Order of the Indian Empire (CIE). Upon returning to Britain later that year, he served as Chief Engineer, Home Counties District, from 1946 to 1949. Promoted to Major General in 1949, he held his final military appointment as Director of Fortifications and Works at the War Office, retiring in 1952 with the rank of Companion of the Order of the Bath (CB).

He became a member of the Institution of Civil Engineers in 1951 and during the 1960s worked with Engineer Planning and Resources (Epar) Ltd., based at 50 Pall Mall, London, contributing to major hotel construction projects in the Levant. When assigned to the War Office, he relocated from Trebetherick, on Padstow Bay in Cornwall, to Delaford Manor in Iver, Buckinghamshire, where he remained until his death. Grand was fatally injured in a motorway accident and was pronounced dead on arrival at Putney Hospital, London, on 22 November 1975.
