= Military Intelligence (Research) =

Section of the War Office for guerrilla warfare during World War 2

- General Staff (Research)
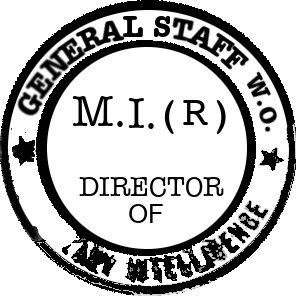
- Stamp used by MI(R) when issued to operatives for Identity Cards.

Agency overview
- Formed: MI(R): 1918; GS(R): 1936; MI(R): 1939
- Dissolved: 1940
- Superseding agencies: SO3; G(R)
- Ministers responsible: Neville Chamberlain, Prime Minister; Winston Churchill, Prime Minister
- Agency executives: Unknown officer, 1st Chief; Jo Holland, 2nd Chief; Joan Bright Astley, Secretary; Millis Jefferis, Deputy Chief Technical Services; Colin Gubbins, Deputy Chief of General Service and Training
- Parent agency: War Office, (From 1936); Special Operations Executive, (From 1940)
- Child agencies: MI(R)a; MI(R)b; MI(R)c, (Until 1940)

Military Intelligence (Research), abbreviated as MI(R), originally known as General Staff (Research), or GS(R), was a section of the British War Office established in 1936 under the Deputy Chief of the Imperial General Staff (DCIGS). MI(R) was designed to be effectively the British "clearing house for bright ideas," and a think tank for government research into the forms of irregular and guerrilla warfare which might be advantageous for the British Armed Forces, but over the course of its existence, it evolved from its simple research function, and became itself a paramilitary organization. For the majority of its known declassified existence, MI(R) was directed by Jo Holland. MI(R) effectively created the doctrine of future British special operations, especially through the course of mid-1940. Alongside its research and operations in guerrilla warfare, Holland and MI(R) also spent a great deal of time generating ideas for inventions and gadgets to be deployed into the field. To this end, MI(R) created and oversaw the initial operations of MIR(c), the unit which became known as Churchill's Toyshop, responsible for the development of weapons and equipment intended for use by guerrillas operating behind enemy lines.

Because MI(R) was not organized as a "unit," the officers serving here were not issued distinctive regimental badges, regimental caps or ties. If officers transferred in from other units, they retained their original caps and badges. Those officers that were recruited directly into MI(R) were initially badged into the General Service Corps, and as of July 1940, were badged into the Intelligence Corps.

== History ==
=== Origins ===
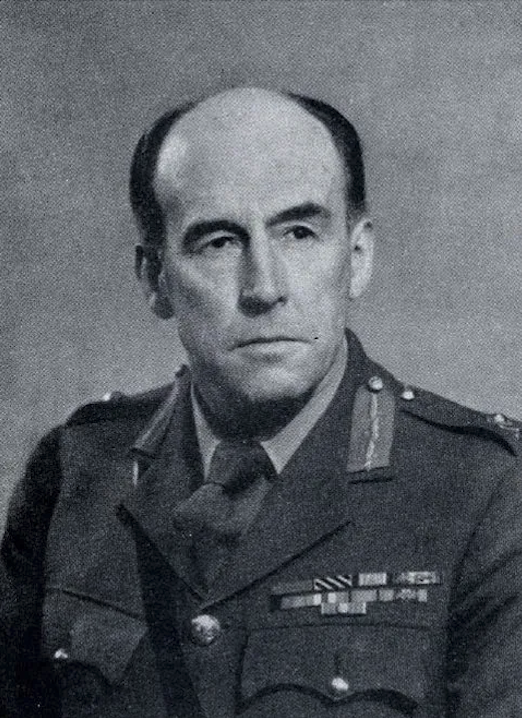
John Charles Francis Holland was the first known director of GS(R), but at least one other as-yet unnamed person held the job before him.

During the First World War, the War Office had created the Dunsterforce, which was effectively a special forces operation comprising a thousand men. The areas of Palestine, British Egypt, and elsewhere in the Middle East were occupied by dozens of battles involving irregular warfare. The exploits of T. E. Lawrence became extremely well known by the members of the British military who both worked on operations with him, and studied his tactics and maneuvers afterwards. One such man who is known to have worked alongside Lawrence on an operation in Palestine was John Charles Francis Holland, or Jo Holland. Holland won several medals for his service in the Middle East.

During the war, and shortly afterward, the British Empire had to contend with uprisings in the British Raj, with many different internal forces of vying for independence through either violent or nonviolent means. 1918 had marked the return to India of Mahatma Gandhi, but the next year also saw Britain occupied with the Third Anglo-Afghan War, and several other battles in disparate areas of the Indian Frontier, to include especially the North-West Frontier and the North-East Frontier. On the Indian Frontier, the British worked with the Gurkhas and other units to counter Indian independence forces in the field. One man who had been working on the frontiers of India around this time was Laurence Grand, who was performing guerrilla operations of his own in the region. Holland also served on the Frontier around this time.

Another organization that existed during the war was a brief-existing section of MI called MI(R), which collected intelligence inside of Soviet Russia and the Far East. Little is known about this earlier iteration of MI(R), other than that it was decommissioned at the end of the war.

In the 1920's, the Irish War of Independence, and the following Irish Civil War, had proved a series of successive events leading to one of the British Empire's largest territorial defeats in centuries. That war for Irish independence had been won primarily by what were called irregular forces, practicing irregular and guerrilla warfare. Specifically deployed to Ireland during the War of Independence – what the British at the time referred to as "The Troubles in Ireland" – was Jo Holland. On one particular evening, he was sitting in a pub on what might have either been a secret mission for MI, or a rage-filled revenge quest against the man who had killed his friend. After getting into a shootout and getting shot in the chest, Holland, known as Jo, limped out of the pub and into the street just in time to be taken by ambulance to the hospital. After that moment, Holland became fascinated with the technical skill of the Irish Republican Army, noting that they had made a science of guerrilla warfare.

=== Establishment as General Staff (Research) ===
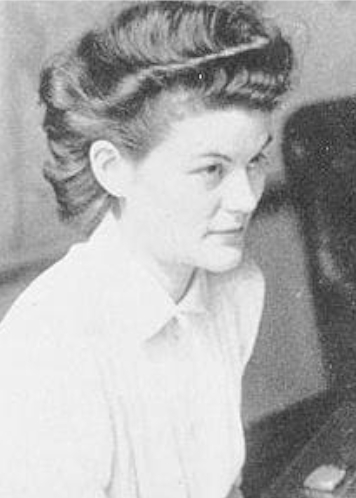
Joan Bright Astley was Holland's personal assistant and secretarial typist, recruited by John Walter. In the steady ramp-up to war, she was joined by another secretary, Lesley Wauchope.

Little is known about the operations of the section of the Imperial General Staff dedicated to research and education, which was established in 1936. Its operations were kept entirely secret for two years, and the name of the Chief of this section in 1936 is not currently known. Whatever historical documents there are, and even books by historians, currently reference only one unnamed man as "the former director," or "the incumbent," and a secretarial typist working in this section. Certain historians suggest that GS(R) was created within the War Office by Sir Ronald Adam. Functioning as an internal research unit, GS(R) enabled promising young officers to spend a year studying contemporary subjects of direct relevance to the modern army and to prepare reports for a variety of departments.

However, much more is known about the activities of GS(R) beginning in 1938, when Jo Holland was appointed to head GS(R) due to his prior experiences in guerrilla warfare. Having suffered a temporary breakdown in health – he had developed a duodenal ulcer – Holland was assigned this less active post through the influence of senior connections, which allowed him to pursue independent study. He had his choice of subjects to study, and it was his decision to focus the efforts of GS(R) on guerrilla warfare. Drawing up packes on lessons learned from recent conflicts in China and Spain, he focused his research on the potential role of guerrilla warfare in future conflicts. His investigations centered on light equipment, mobility, and unconventional tactics, subjects of clear importance given Britain’s own experiences in the South African War, where a quarter of a million troops were required to suppress a much smaller Boer commando force, and in Ireland, where a few thousand irregulars had frustrated a far larger British presence. Holland became a leading advocate for developing irregular warfare capabilities, a view shared by the Deputy Director of Military Intelligence, Beaumont Nesbitt. Despite their efforts, both men met resistance from the conservative Directorate of Military Operations, which adhered closely to established regulations and procedures, even under the joint leadership of Pownall as Director of Military Operations and Intelligence.

He was then tasked with investigating any means that Britain and its Empire might use to support resistance movementsexpected to arise in Eastern Europe, should Nazi expansion produce occupations there. At that time, official sensitivities about overt militarism prevented explicit discussion of any future large-scale regular army commitment to continental conflicts not directly threatening the defence of the realm.

Holland's first office hire was for a secretarial typist, who proved to him to be extremely invaluable. Her name was Joan Bright Astley, and she would go on to become one of the war's most important women, as well as the prototype for the character Miss Moneypenny in the James Bond series.

=== GS(R) combines with Section D to become Scheme D ===
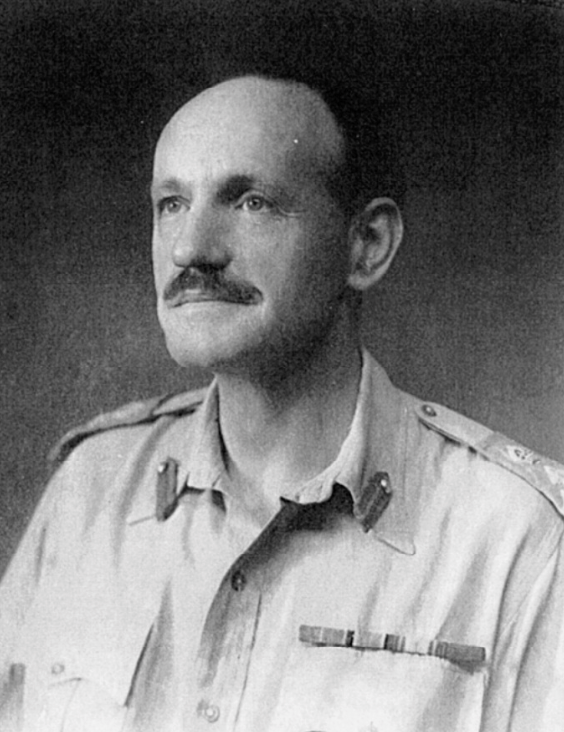
Laurence Grand was the Director of the Section for Destruction.

While Jo Holland was running GS(R), his childhood friend, Laurence Grand, had been running a unit within the Secret Intelligence Service (MI6) called the Section for Destruction. A plan called "Scheme D" emerged in March 1939 when Colonel Grand took a plan for Europe-wide sabotage and subversion to Stewart Menzies of SIS, within days of Germany’s occupation of Prague. The proposal moved quickly through senior channels: it reached the War Office and was debated at a Foreign Office meeting on 23 March attended by top ministers and military figures. From the outset it was treated as an actionable strategy rather than a mere concept.

Section D and GS(R) were effectively merged into a singular organization. SIS agreed to help fund an expanded GS(R), the War Office authorized Section D to plan civilian undercover operations, and a military irregular-warfare arm was developed in parallel to conduct uniformed missions. A new sub-unit was created to manage activities by soldiers operating in uniform and to coordinate military missions with Section D’s covert work.

The architects drew a clear distinction between covert and overt irregular work: Section D’s operatives would work undercover and, if captured, would receive no public acknowledgement; GS(R)'s military irregular force would operate under uniform, follow conventional military planning, and be covered by the usual legal protections. The aim was to cover the full spectrum of irregular activity while preserving a degree of separation between espionage-style sabotage and organized military resistance. The Foreign Office was uneasy about the diplomatic and moral consequences, senior military attitudes at the War Office were sometimes cautious or dismissive, and personal rivalries complicated coordination. Those institutional tensions slowed and blurred implementation, so the ambitious aims of Scheme D outpaced how smoothly it could be executed in practice.

In early April 1939, shortly after the establishment of Scheme D, Holland submitted a memorandum to the Deputy Chief of the Imperial General Staff (DCIGS) and presented his findings again on 13 April, referring informally to his work as “D/M.” The War Office soon expressed concern that one of its sections appeared subordinate to the SIS. During a high-level meeting on 27 June between Holland and senior officers—including the DCIGS, the Directors of Military Operations and Intelligence (DMO&I), and the Deputy Directors of both departments (DDMO and DDMI), it was decided to retain the original title of GS(R).

=== Reorganized as Military Intelligence (Research) ===
However, more meetings resulted at the end of June 1939 in a new charter. It was placed under the authority of Brigadier “Freddy” Beaumont-Nesbitt, the Deputy Director of Military Intelligence, and formally redesignated as MI1(R)—more commonly known simply as MI(R). The title revived that of a former First World War section that had been responsible for intelligence on Soviet Russia. The new charter carefully delineated its responsibilities from those of Section D, and Holland was fine with that. Holland favoured a research-centred MI(R) and was reluctant to vest field operations in the War Office; he expected responsibility for guerrilla operations to rest with existing service departments or with special branches of military missions working alongside local guerrillas.

Holland therefore envisaged a small, centrally staffed body of three officers;

- Holland, Chief of MI(R)
- Colin Gubbins, Deputy Chief of General Service and Training
- Millis Jefferis, Deputy Chief of Technical Development

All three were initially seconded only until April 1940, with additional staff to be seconded to Section D or managed by military missions and Jefferis serving largely as an adviser to Section D’s technical section.

The War Office sought a distinct MI(R) identity separate from Section D, Holland recruited personnel in advance of formal project approvals, and the unit acquired wider administrative responsibilities; this growth increasingly drew MI(R) away from pure research and toward project management. Holland nevertheless attempted cost-saving measures (for example, seeking an unpaid survey of Romanian railways) and delayed permanent appointments where possible.

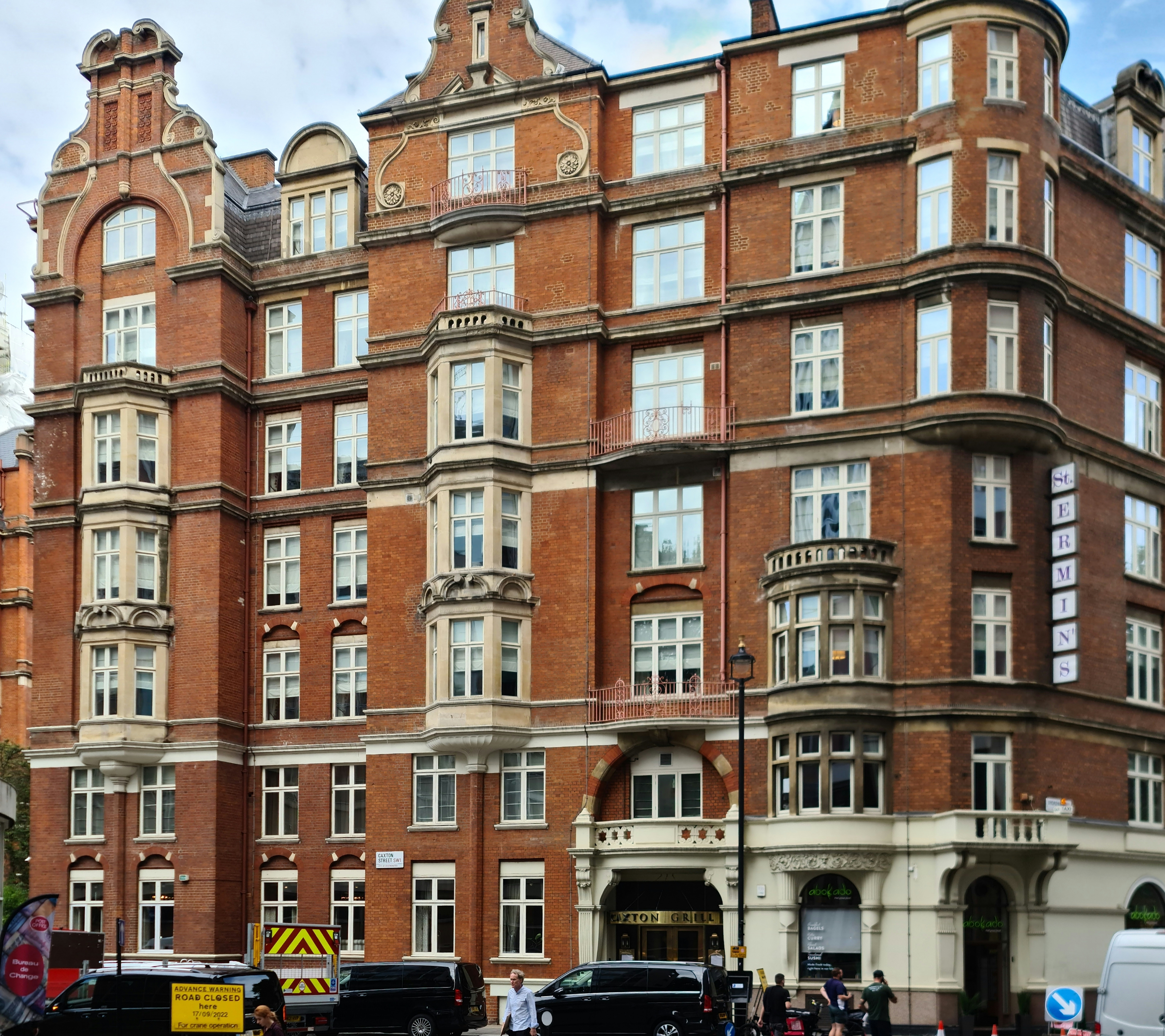
In 1939, MI(R) and Section D shared offices in this building at #2 Caxton Street

Section D relocated from the SIS basement at 54 Broadway to shared offices with MI(R) at 2 Caxton Street, where close physical proximity produced overlapping work: joint training at nearby Caxton Hall, staff exchanges, and blurred lines of responsibility. Some officers moved between the two organisations as needs required. The Chief of the Imperial General Staff, Lord Gort, worried about the legality and political sensitivity of irregular-warfare activities, preferring Reserve or Territorial rather than Regular officers for such work and reserving final responsibility to the CIGS. Consequently MI(R) was to become operational only when British military action was imminent; during the Phoney War its work consisted largely of desk studies and position papers. Holland, who treated MI(R) primarily as an advisory think-tank, tolerated Section D’s unofficial handling of more hazardous irregular tasks, but expectations that MI(R) could routinely partner openly with foreign General Staffs proved unrealistic.

Holland set out MI(R)’s core aims in April 1939 as studying guerrilla methods and producing a Field Service Regulations manual, developing destructive devices suitable for guerrillas, and devising procedures and organisation for conducting guerrilla activities. On 19 April 1939 he sought information from military attachés in Warsaw, Bucharest, Athens and Belgrade about explosives, vulnerable bridges, existing guerrilla plans, and the likely reaction to British advice.

=== The field manuals ===
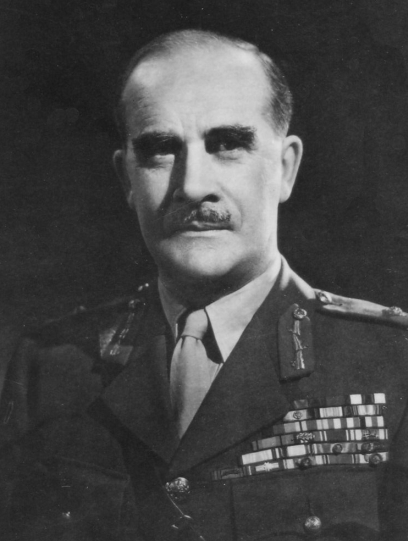
A staffer at the War Office named Colin Gubbins was recruited into MI(R) in 1939 by Jo Holland to produce a Field Service Regulations manual.

The initial task of MI(R) was to create a guerrilla warfare field manual, in keeping with the British Army’s tradition of codifying every procedure. Holland first proposed a comprehensive guide with country-specific chapters, but this was reduced to three short pamphlets to establish MI(R)’s professional standing with foreign General Staffs. Majors Colin Gubbins and Millis Jefferis were assigned to produce them.

Gubbins, a Royal Artillery officer from the Military Training Directorate (MT1), brought experience in linguistics, recruitment, and training, as well as familiarity with Russia, Poland, and Czechoslovakia. Jefferis, a Royal Engineer known for inventive explosives work, was tasked with writing a demolition manual and developing new devices. Joan Bright organized MI(R)’s office and managed its SIS funding, earning a reputation for efficiency and authority rare for women in the War Office. She later compiled the MI(R) War Diary. Another secretary, Isabel Margaret Lesley Wauchope, was hired on in the ramp-up to war, and added wit and composure during the hectic prewar months.

Gubbins had been recruited directly by Holland at the War Office and introduced to Laurence Grand of Section D over lunch at St Ermin’s Hotel. All three had trained at the Royal Military Academy, Woolwich, and worked on mechanization in different War Office branches. Though not a guerrilla warfare expert, Gubbins’s training expertise was crucial. Fluent in several languages and a veteran of service in Russia and Ireland, he was described as disciplined, energetic, and quietly determined. Colleagues admired his drive and leadership but also noted his ambition and ruthlessness—traits that would later shape MI(R)’s often strained relations with Section D.

Between spring and summer 1939, MI(R) underwent an intense period of activity. Gubbins produced The Partisan Leader’s Handbook and, with Holland, The Art of Guerrilla Warfare—concise manuals summarizing irregular warfare theory and tactics. Jefferis contributed How to Use High Explosives, a short guide on demolitions. Printed in pocket format and translated into more than sixteen languages, these pamphlets established MI(R)’s professional credibility. Holland’s accompanying Report No. 8 (1 June 1939) formalized his belief that guerrilla operations should support conventional forces by diverting enemy strength, not replace them.

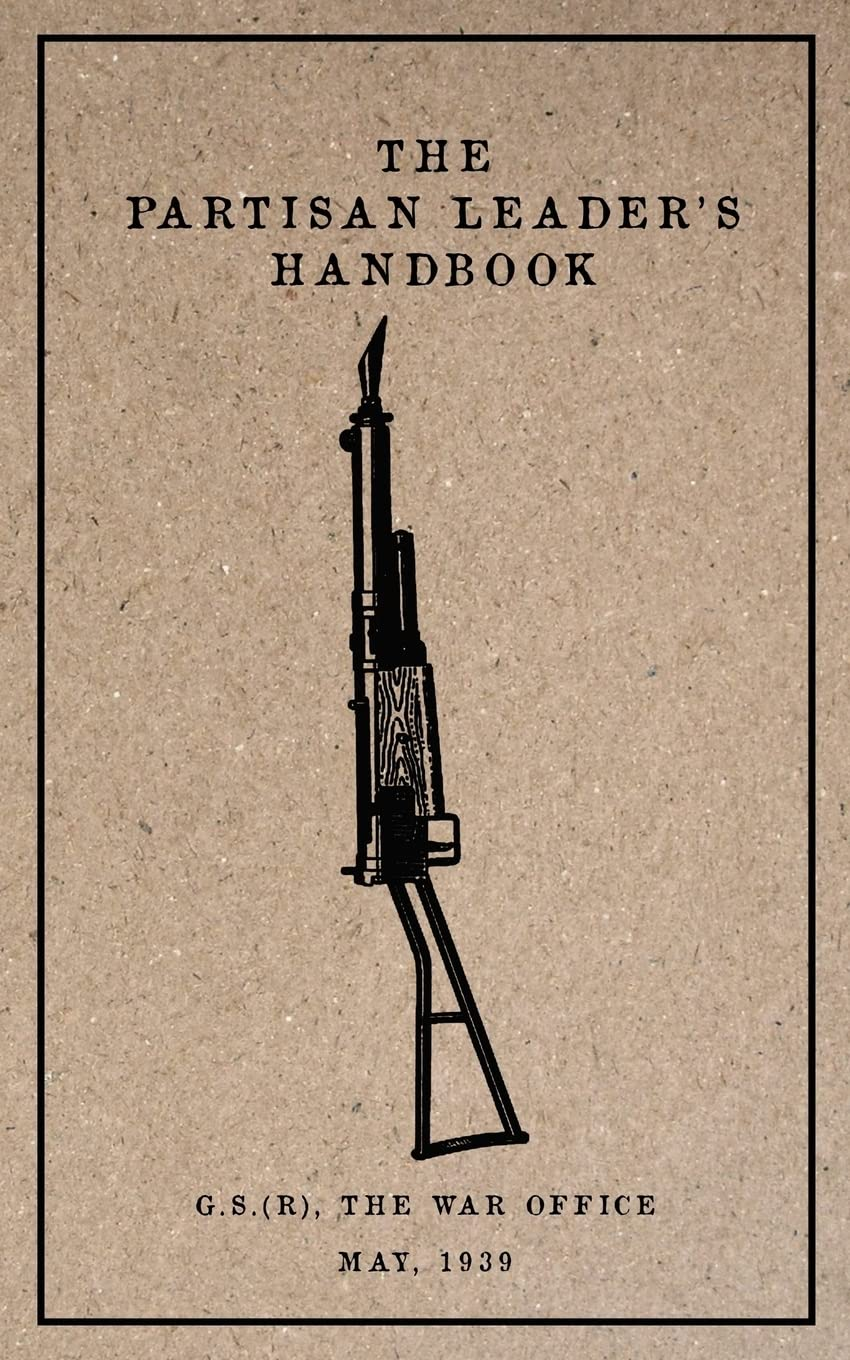
The Partisan Leader's Handbook, written by Colin Gubbins

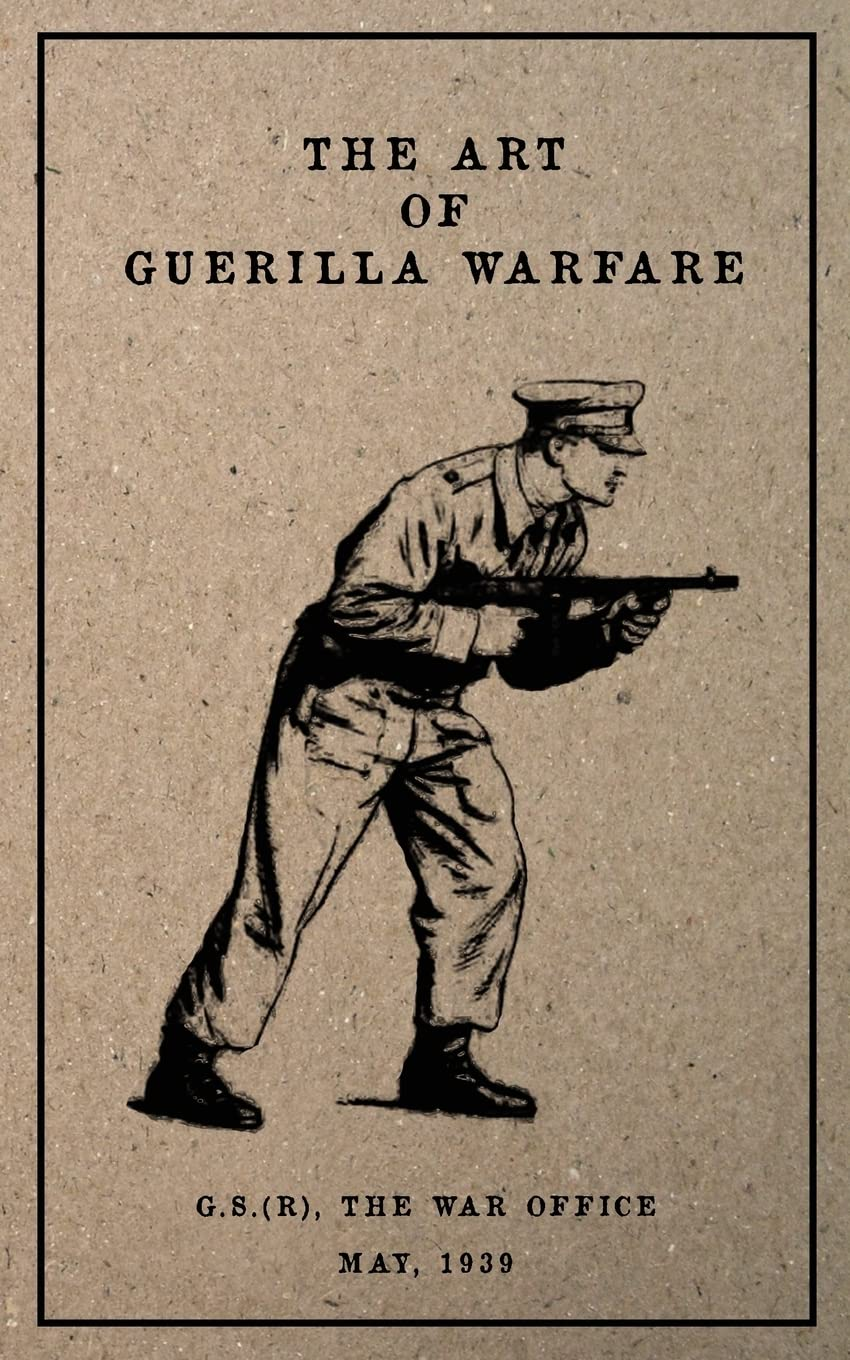
The Art of Guerrilla Warfare, written by Jo Holland and Colin Gubbins

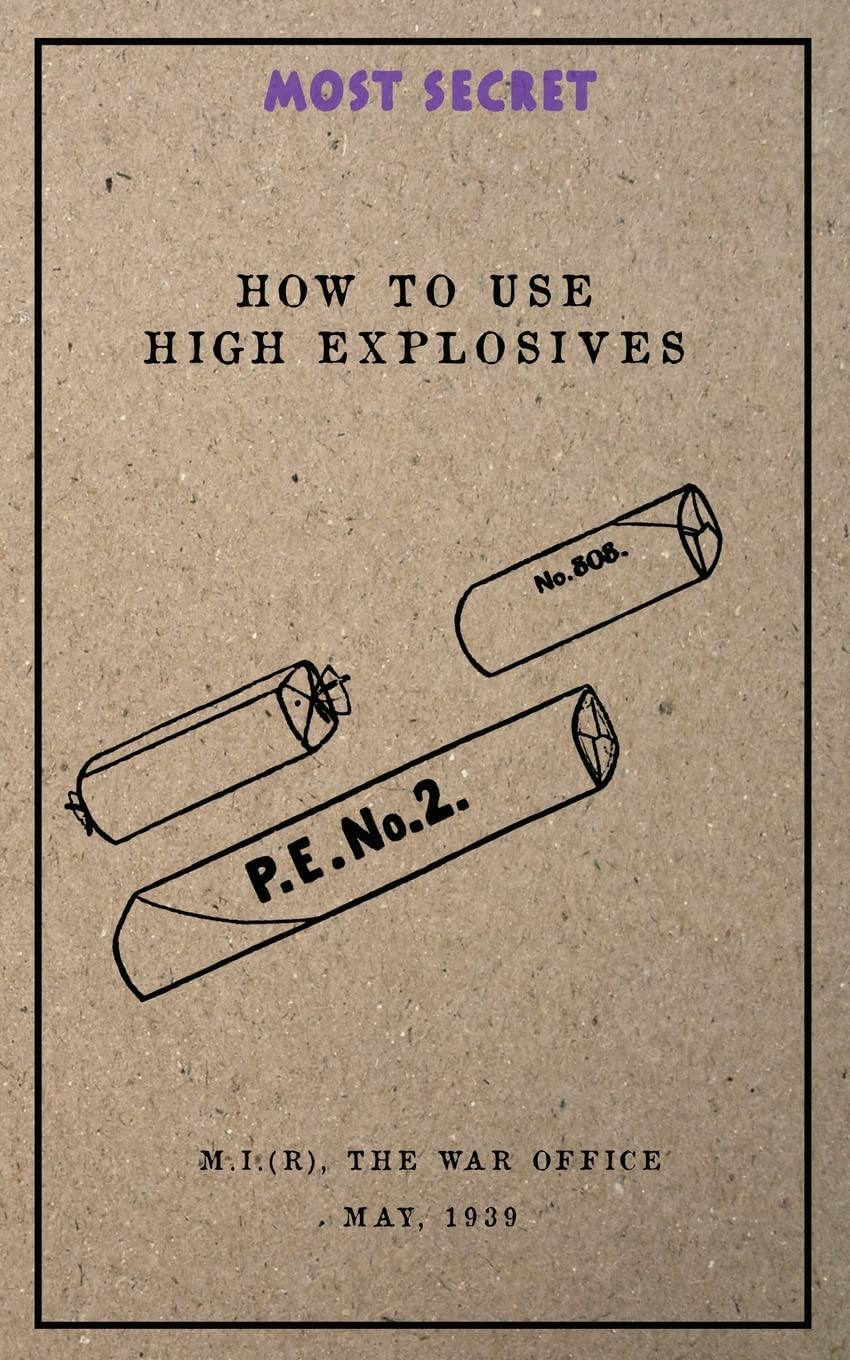
How to Use High Explosives, written by Millis Jefferis

=== Increased workload in Europe ===
Holland’s growing reputation secured the cancellation of his Malta posting in July, allowing MI(R) to expand its work through military missions to Allied and neutral states. Gubbins was dispatched across Europe — especially to Poland — to coordinate with foreign General Staffs, distribute sabotage materials, and prepare for guerrilla resistance. Jefferis continued developing new devices despite official orders to pause technical projects. Poland was prioritized for supplies, with similar plans for Romania’s oilfields.

MI(R) divided its missions into three categories:

- Active missions, advising allied forces and resistance movements on guerrilla tactics and supply.
- Passive missions, organizing anti–“fifth column” measures in neutral states.
- Inspection missions, monitoring British communities abroad and countering propaganda.

Efforts were also made to post MI(R) officers as assistant military attachés to strengthen liaison with local armies and British intelligence agencies, though most had little training. Broader Intelligence Bureaux were proposed for occupied regions such as the Caucasus, modeled on the World War I Arab Bureau, but these ideas were overtaken by the creation of the SOE, which absorbed many MI(R) initiatives.

Holland tried to focus limited resources on still-free countries, with Poland as the immediate priority. Gubbins made several visits there in 1939, liaising with the Polish General Staff’s pre-existing guerrilla plans and later joining General Carton de Wiart’s mission. His field experience and frustration with Section D’s extravagance deepened tensions between the two organizations.

By July 1939 MI(R)’s first progress report recorded modest achievements—training about seventy recruits, translating its pamphlets, and producing initial explosive devices. The August report remained pessimistic, noting few operational results and continued bureaucratic inertia, in sharp contrast to Section D’s headlong pursuit of covert action.

=== Establishment of Sub-Sections ===
By August 1939, MI(R) still lacked a clear wartime structure and relied heavily on SIS funding. Holland warned that without firm War Office support, MI(R)’s work risked becoming “little more than busy-bodying.” When war began in September, he issued a report defining MI(R)’s role as military—not political—research, distinct from Section D’s covert sabotage. MI(R) would work through formal military missions, while Section D operated secretly in enemy-occupied areas.

Holland expanded MI(R) in anticipation of war, recruiting officers from the Territorial Army Reserve and personal contacts, including John Walter, John Brunyate, William Allen, Ralph Greg, and Michael Colefax. A War Establishment of 8 September authorized a modest staff led by Holland, Gubbins, and Jefferis, with Royal Engineers assigned to field demolitions. Officers such as Crockatt and Combe coordinated European and overseas projects, while Jefferis developed MI(R)’s technical branch (later MI(R)c).

Early wartime activities included organizing Polish and Romanian missions, planning sabotage in the Middle East and Caucasus, and founding MI9. Holland emphasized MI(R)’s purpose as devising irregular components to aid regular campaigns, but warned against being drawn into direct operations. Despite his restraint, MI(R)’s expansion caused friction within the War Office, where its unorthodox methods and independence led to complaints, particularly over staff recruitment and munitions development.

To regularize its position, MI(R) was formally integrated into the Directorate of Military Intelligence in February 1940 with five defined functions:

- research on special or irregular forces
- technical research and production
- execution of approved projects
- limited intelligence collection for specific operations
- recruitment and training for irregular warfare

By April 1940 MI(R) had evolved from an SIS offshoot into a recognized War Office section, though still viewed as “useful but turbulent.” It relocated to the War Office’s third floor, maintaining cooperation with Section D on shared missions in Romania, the Middle East, and Greece. However, friction persisted—especially over Poland, where Gubbins resisted SIS authority.

The March 1940 Hankey Inquiry reaffirmed boundaries: MI(R) would plan and support sabotage where British forces operated; Section D would act in occupied or neutral areas. Yet MI(R)’s limited results and Gubbins’s overreach led to his removal. As part of a broader intelligence reorganization (March–June 1940), MI(R) lost much of its staff to other departments and was reduced to three core sections:

- MI(R)a: Coordination and liaison with SIS (Kenyon, Fleming, Davies)
- MI(R)b: Special Operations and Political Action (Roberts, Colefax, Greg)
- MI(R)c: Technical development (Jefferis)

Despite contraction, MI(R) laid the groundwork for British irregular warfare policy and the future Special Operations Executive.

=== Reduction in staff, increase in workload ===
By 24 April 1940 MI(R)’s central staff had shrunk below its outbreak-of-war level while Section D expanded to roughly 300 personnel. On 3 June the unit was recorded as Colonel Holland (Room 368), Majors Kenyon and Warren and several captains (Room 367), with Jefferis and Macrae isolated in Room 173. Cuts to the centre coincided with a rising workload as many project officers were deployed to Norway or reassigned to form G(R) in the Middle East, producing what one participant called an atmosphere of “repressed frustration.” MI(R)c’s technical flexibility was, however, widely praised.

By late May 1940, amid France’s collapse and the Dunkirk evacuation, British strategy turned more readily to irregular methods. Holland prepared briefing papers that persuaded senior staff the war might best be won by subversion, economic pressure and fomenting revolt in occupied territories. Consequently, late-June decisions reversed earlier staff cuts and proposed an expanded War Establishment (2 July 1940) to place MI(R) at the centre of a co-ordinated irregular-warfare effort. Holland even urged MI(R) to organise clandestine sabotage and fifth-column activities (the Foreign Office preferred a euphemistic cover of “Welfare of British Communities Abroad”), but he feared that short-term operational demands were crowding out MI(R)’s research role and that the War Office might lose control of irregular warfare to other ministries.

Holland’s strategic prescription subordinated resistance to the timetable for a future Allied return to Europe: local networks were to build capacity and avoid large-scale action until they could support an invasion, with small sabotage made to appear accidental. This “keep your powder dry” policy—endorsed by the Chiefs of Staff in September 1940—clashed with Churchill’s “Set Europe Ablaze” impulse and Hugh Dalton’s more aggressive SOE programme.

Holland also argued for specialist military units trained to operate behind enemy lines—a principle that underpinned the Commandos, LRDG, SAS, the Jedburgh teams and Chindits. Independent Companies were hurriedly formed in April 1940; the Commandos were proposed in early June and authorised days later. Holland’s 7 June 1940 memorandum on the composition and tactics of small forces for behind-the-lines work—emphasising rapid movement, disruption of lines of communication, light equipment, air resupply and portable wireless—served as an early blueprint for these special forces and remained one of MI(R)’s most enduring contributions.

== Churchill's Toyshop ==
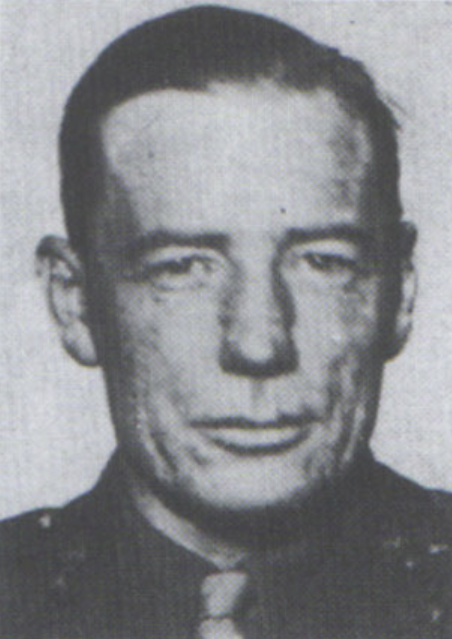
Millis Jefferis was hired to run the Technical Services section of GS(R), which became MI(R)c, later known as "Churchill's Toyshop."

While MI(R)c was under the command of Millis Jefferis and MI(R), it produced a number of novel devices, including the close-combat anti-tank mortar known as the Blacker Bombard, devised by L. V. S. Blacker, an employee at MI(R). At the outbreak of war, MI(R)’s work was principally concerned with mines and anti-tank weapons. An MI(R) directive of 1939 observed that, “If guerrilla warfare is co-ordinated and also related to main operations it should, in favourable circumstances, cause such a diversion of enemy strength as eventually to present decisive opportunities to the main forces.” MI(R)’s research into irregular warfare and its special weapons development subsequently produced equipment that supplemented the Home Guard’s arsenal.

Holland also established several covert branches; one, MI9 (the Escape Service), developed concealed magnetic escape compasses for aircrew—devices small enough to be hidden in clothing, including trouser fly-buttons. Jefferis worked closely with MI9 to invent even more devices later in the war.

== Merger into SOE ==
In the summer of 1940, MI(R) was merged with Electra House and the Section for Destruction (Section D) to become part of the Special Operations Executive (SOE). It existed for some time as a functional unit of SOE, before being reorganized as G(R) and SO3 within SOE's structure. Holland soon left the SOE, and returned to duty in the Royal Engineers.
