= Section D =

Section of the MI6 during WW2

Section for Destruction

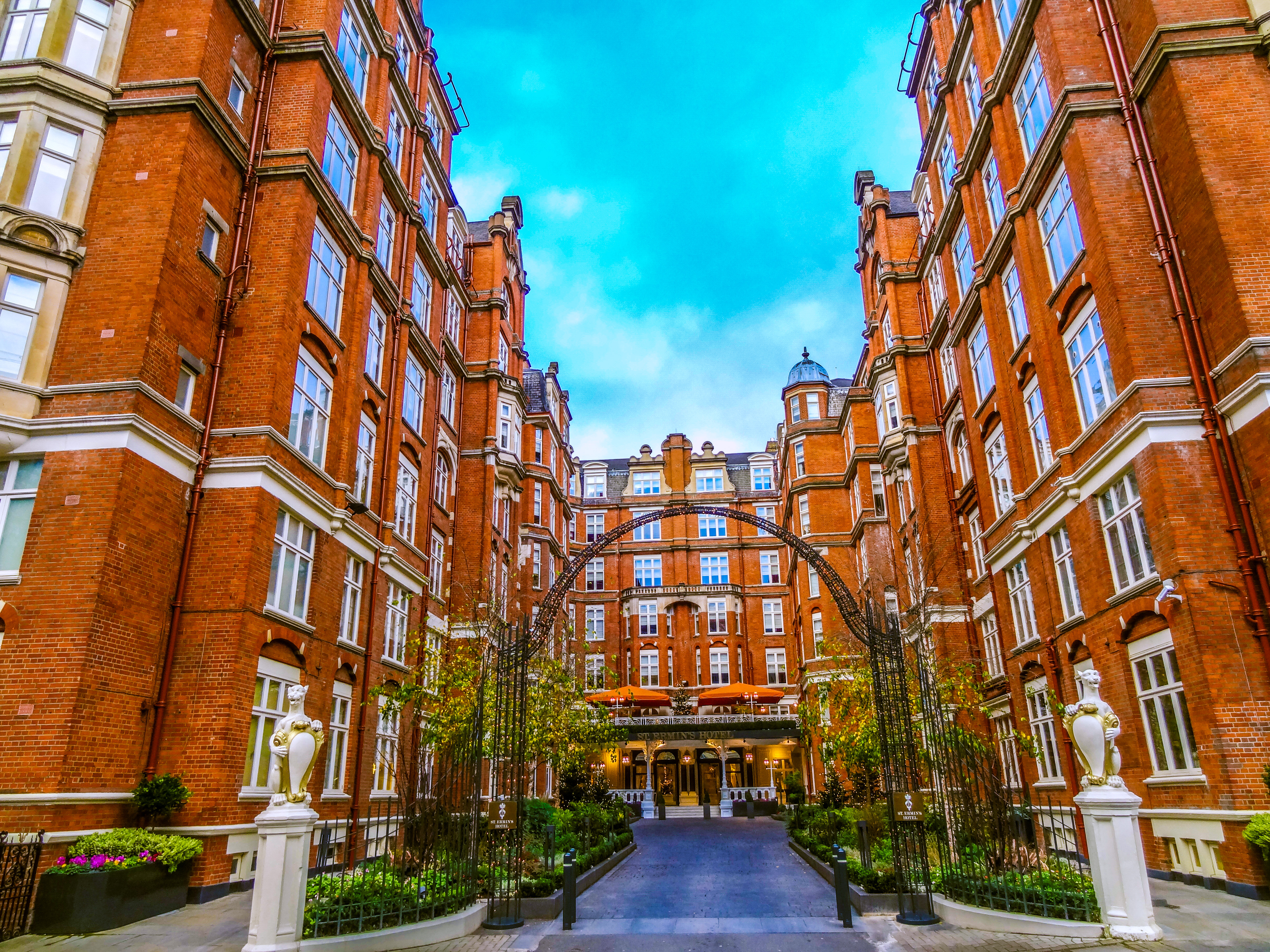
- St. Ermin's Hotel in London served as the final HQ of Section D before it was absorbed into the SOE

Agency overview
- Formed: 1 April 1938
- Dissolved: 23 October 1940
- Superseding agency: SO2
- Headquarters: The Frythe (1st HQ); 2 Caxton Street (2nd HQ); Bletchley Park (3rd HQ); 54 Broadway (4th HQ); St. Ermin's Hotel (5th HQ)
- Ministers responsible: Neville Chamberlain, Prime Minister; Winston Churchill, Prime Minister; Lord Halifax, Foreign Secretary; Hugh Dalton, Minister of Economic Warfare
- Deputy Minister responsible: Victor Cavendish-Bentinck, Chair of the Joint Intelligence Committee
- Agency executive: Laurence Grand, Chief of Section D
- Parent agency: Secret Intelligence Service; Special Operations Executive

The Section for Destruction (or Section D), originally established as Section IX, was a wartime irregular warfare, guerrilla warfare, destruction, and sabotage unit of the Secret Intelligence Service (SIS or MI6). Its headquarters were originally garrisoned at The Frythe, expanded into Bletchley Park and 2 Caxton Street, moved to 54 Broadway, and finally relocated to the St. Ermin’s Hotel.

The director of Section D was Laurence Grand. In telegrams, his codename was simplified to the letter D, in a similar manner to his boss, who was known as C. In the summer of 1940, Section D was merged with Electra House and the Department of Military Intelligence Research (MI(R)) to become part of the Special Operations Executive (SOE). It continued to exist at SOE for several months while being gradually absorbed into the new agency.

Section D suffered only two British fatalities during the war, Norman Hope and Geoffrey Frodsham, but relied heavily on local resistance networks, including Slovenian and Czech saboteurs who faced far higher risks. The contributions of these non-communist groups were largely erased during the Cold War when their countries under communist rule downplayed the efforts of anti-Nazi forces unaffiliated with their ideology. Some figures, such as Ante Anić and Milko Brezigar, were forced into exile for their wartime associations with British intelligence, while others, like Romanian leader Iuliu Maniu, were imprisoned.

== History ==
Before the Second World War, Britain’s intelligence gathering depended primarily on the Secret Intelligence Service (SIS), Foreign Office agents operating abroad, and the Military Intelligence Directorate (MI) of the War Office. However, the growing threat posed by Adolf Hitler, the Sudeten Crisis, and the increasing likelihood of war prompted the formation of a new, independent organization. In March 1938, a meeting in Whitehall between Lord Halifax, the newly appointed Foreign Secretary, Lord Hankey, the Secretary to the War Cabinet, and Major Joe Holland of the Royal Engineers, chief of GS (R), resulted in the establishment of a separate intelligence body distinct from any of the operations at SIS and MI. Because the SIS used the codename C, the new organization was designated Section D, and "Destruction" almost immediately was applied as its backronym.

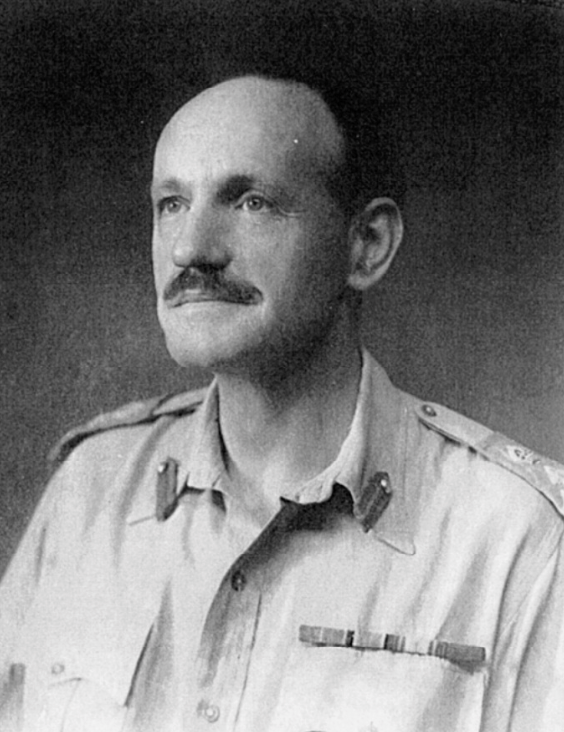
Laurence Douglas Grand was the Director of Section D.

On 1 April 1938, the Section for Destruction was established as Section IX of the Secret Intelligence Service (SIS) under Major Laurence Grand, acting under the direction of Admiral Sir Hugh Sinclair, the Chief of SIS at the time. Its purpose was to prepare for covert and irregular warfare against Nazi Germany through sabotage, black propaganda, and other forms of political warfare. Active operations began in March 1939, five months before the outbreak of war, with initial efforts focused on disrupting economic supplies to Germany from neutral countries in Scandinavia, Western Europe, and the Balkans.

The intelligence officers of Section D differed from the popular image of youthful wartime spies. Most were in their forties, as younger men would have been conspicuous for not wearing uniform. A minority had prior experience in intelligence, but the majority were recruited from business and industry and were granted army commissions to provide both cover and legal status. They were commissioned either on the General List, used for officers not assigned to a specific regiment or corps, or, from July 1940, within the newly established Intelligence Corps.

Many officers were the sons of diplomats or army officers serving in the British Empire, while others, including Basil Davidson and Walter Wren, came from commercial or professional backgrounds. Given the section’s initial focus on propaganda, numerous recruits were drawn from the advertising industry, notably from the J. Walter Thompson Agency, whose managing director, Douglas Saunders, made the firm’s resources available to Section D. Personnel with technical expertise, particularly mining engineers (and their industrial explosives) from Chester Beatty’s Selection Trust Group in the Balkans, were later recruited for sabotage planning and operations.

Early in the war, SIS maintained no formal recruitment process. One of Section D’s administrative innovations was the establishment of the training facility at Brickendonbury. Most recruits joined through personal recommendation from family, social, or educational contacts. Section D also maintained informal links with the newspaper industry, both for low-level intelligence collection and to identify potential recruits. Kim Philby was reportedly recruited after a conversation with the Daily Express war correspondent Hester Harriot Marsden-Smedley, who referred him to Marjorie Maxse, Chief of Staff to Laurence Grand. Philby later became briefly the Director of the schoolhouse at Brickendonbury, which came to be known as the D School. Many officers were educated at Rugby School and Oxbridge.

Section D formed partnerships with Catholic, Jewish, and socialist networks, including Hans Ebeling’s Catholic group, Josef Hirschberg’s Jewish trade campaigns, and members of the exiled Social Democratic Party. Mutual distrust persisted, however, as Section D worried about being exploited by impoverished exile groups seeking funds. Immanuel Birnbaum, for example, a German Social Democrat of Jewish descent, betrayed the Scandinavian Bureau of Section D to the Nazi SD, and the Bureau's leaders who didn't escape were imprisoned or killed.

While Section D officers served on a voluntary basis, technical personnel assigned to the organization’s research and supply facility at Aston House were posted there directly by the War Office.

In 1940, attention shifted toward fostering layered networks of resistance in territories on the verge of German occupation. This strategy was extended to Britain itself with the formation of a civilian guerrilla organization called the Home Defence Scheme, intended to complement existing SIS resistance plans. The War Office, however, viewed Section D’s move into domestic operations with alarm. While it supported the use of irregular fighters abroad, it strongly opposed the idea of civilian guerrillas operating within Britain. In response, the War Office established the Auxiliary Units to provide organized support for regular forces in the event of invasion.

== The Cruising Club and the inception of the Shetland Bus ==
Section D operated a large section in Scandinavia. In 1938, it began recruiting from the ranks of the Royal Navy, and especially from the Royal Naval Volunteer Reserve (RNVR). In 1939, Frank George Griffith Carr, an accomplished yachtsman and recently recruited member of Section D seconded from the RNVR, created a small reconnaissance group known as the Cruising Club with S. August Courtauld and Gerard Holdsworth. Their mission was to survey the coasts of Norway, Denmark, Holland, and Belgium to identify potential landing sites for agents, sabotage equipment, and propaganda material. From this early maritime intelligence work, Frank Carr went on to establish seaborne smuggling routes into occupied Norway, which formed the direct genesis of the Shetland Bus, the clandestine boat service linking Shetland with the Norwegian resistance.

Supporting this development were refugee Norwegian seamen who escaped to Shetland after the German invasion of Norway in 1940. Mons Storemark, who fled Norway on 9 May 1940 as skipper of the Wailet, brought six refugees to Shetland and soon took part in Section D’s first and second Norwegian expeditions as pilot and skipper. Other early participants included Rubin Langmoe, a Norwegian naval reservist who joined the first Section D expedition with Karl Kronberg, and Otto Ferdinand Aksdal, who escaped from Norway with Olav Leirvåg and also took part in these initial missions.

On the Shetland side, John Scott Ratter, a local grocer and fisherman on the island of Yell, served as Section D’s contact with Norwegian smuggling vessels and maintained a secret explosives store near Whale Firth. His cooperation linked local resources with the emerging network of Norwegian operatives.

== Closure and merger into SOE ==
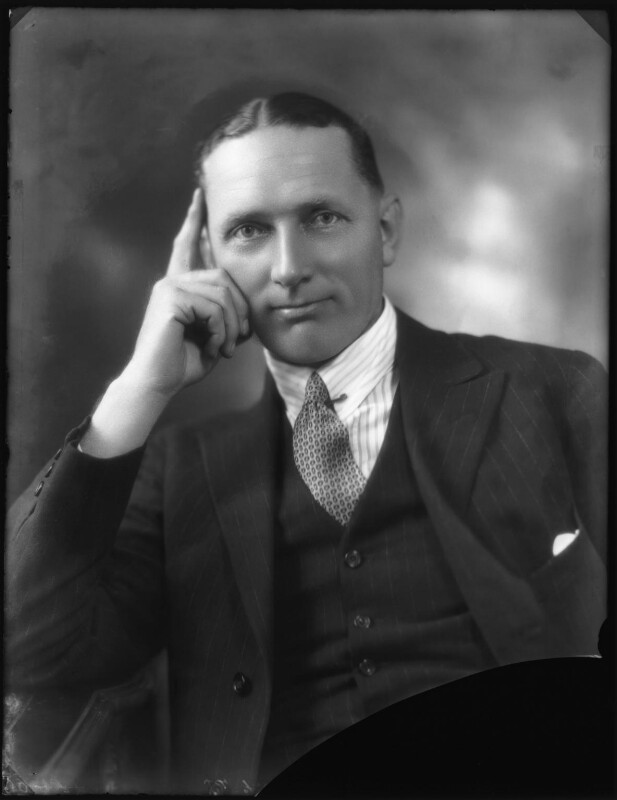
As the Acting Chief of Section D from 18 September to 23 October, a tenure little over a month, Frank Nelson oversaw the final processes of the merger of Section D into the SOE.

By the time Section D was absorbed into the newly created Special Operations Executive (SOE) in 1940, it employed around 300 paid officers, though its real reach was far greater. Much of its activity depended on agents recruited from allied and dissident foreign groups, particularly Austrian and German exiles. The section operated in more than twenty European countries, concentrating its efforts in the Balkans and in nations that remained neutral during the early stages of the war. Many of the first officers of the new SOE had been trained at the D School.

The Special Operations Executive was established on 22 July 1940. Initially, SOE functioned as a coordinating body for Section D, MI(R), and Electra House, but only on 16 August did it assume direct control. Section D maintained its separate identity until Laurence Grand’s dismissal on 18 September, and its official re-designation as SO2 occurred on 23 October 1940. In the little over one month that Section D existed after Grand left for India, its acting director was Frank Nelson. Structurally, Section D was divided into overlapping sub-sections with fluid personnel assignments, and many of its code identifiers—such as D/H1 or D/X1—were retained into SOE service.

Because Section D often concealed British involvement, its operations were understated compared with SOE’s later exploits. Accounts of assassination are rare, limited to brief references such as the activities of Yugoslav officer Ante Anić, who helped sabotage German rail transport. When the countries in which Section D operated were occupied, clandestine warfare changed drastically. SOE inherited many of Section D’s missions but faced new moral and strategic challenges, including the devastating reprisals against civilians. Churchill’s order to “Set Europe Ablaze” ignored these consequences, leading to heavy losses with limited strategic effect.

== In popular culture ==
- In Series 5 of Peaky Blinders, Section D is mentioned in connection with a car bombing. The narrative of the show moves the creation of Section D forward by a little over a decade.
- The show Spooks (aired in the US as MI5), features as the main counterterrorism unit of MI5, an organization called Section D. This fictional narrative moves the historical absorption of SOE and Section D into MI5, instead of MI6.
- In Series 3 of Foyle's War, Section D is mentioned in the first episode as the former workplace of the character Giles Messenger.
