= Brickendonbury =

Estate in Hertfordshire, England

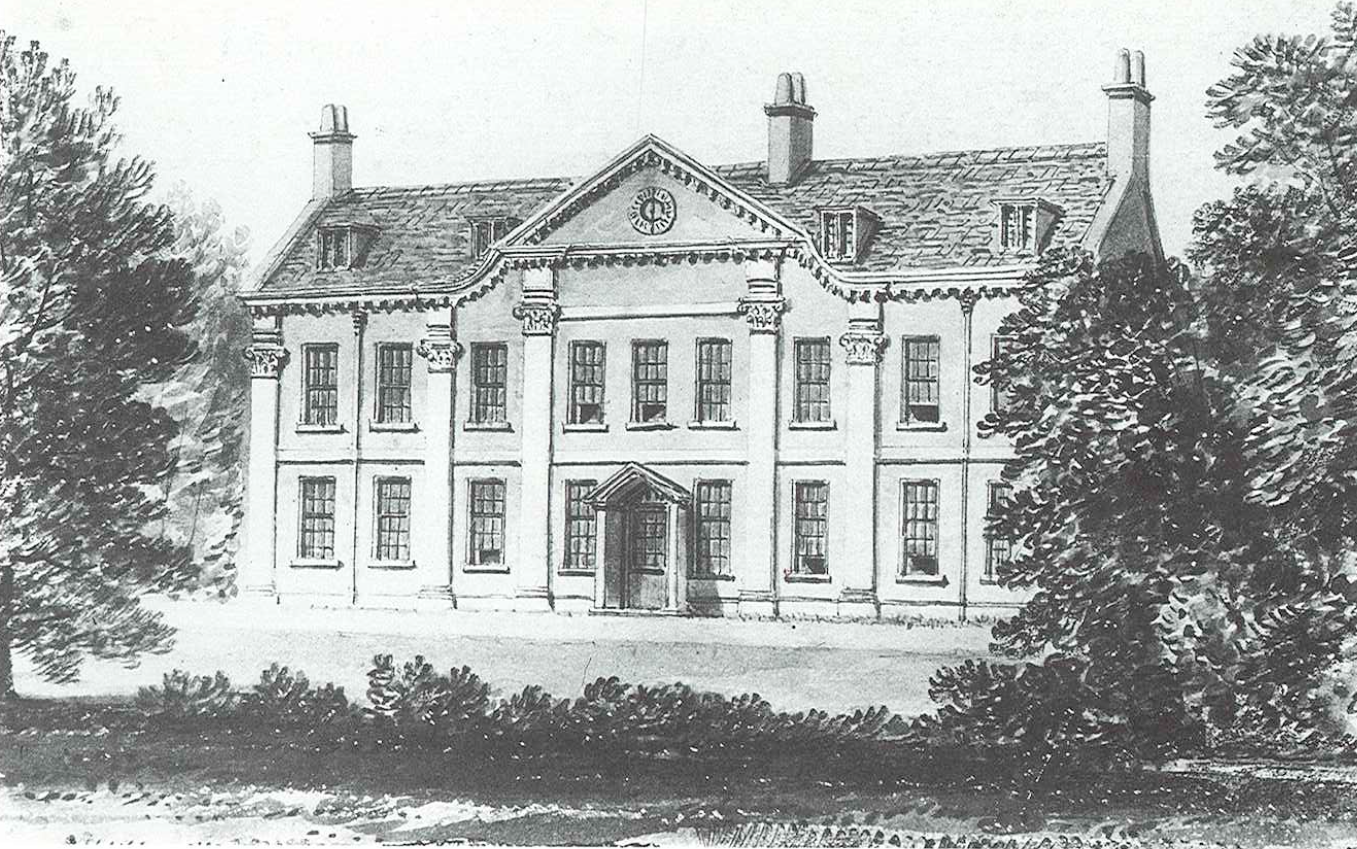
- Brickendonbury Mansion, a large building on the estate, seen here in 1834 in a drawing by John Chessell Buckler

General information
- Classification: Private property, no public access
- Location: Brickendon Liberty Parish, Hertfordshire, England
- Coordinates: 51.776954781084285°N 0.07472233991543233°W
- Owner: Tun Abdul Razak Research Centre
- Affiliation: National Heritage List for England

Other information
- Parking: For employees only

Website
- brickendonbury.co.uk

Brickendonbury is an estate in the Metropolitan Green Belt, roughly halfway between Hertford and Brickendon, consisting of several Victorian era farmhouses, a Georgian era mansion, several blockhouses, and modern facilities. Several of the buildings on the estate are listed in the National Heritage List for England, including the main Brickendonbury Manor, Clock Cottage, East Cottage, and Stable Cottage. The farm area of this estate has been continuously inhabited since at least the Saxon era, and several Roman coins have also been found here, indicating a much earlier presence. It was briefly home to the Stratton Park School. During World War II, the estate was occupied by Section D of the Secret Intelligence Service to become "D School", the first British school ever established for modern guerrilla warfare, which was later operated by the Special Operations Executive (SOE). In the early 1970s, the estate was used to film Catweazle, a television show about a time traveling wizard.

In 1974, Brickendonbury was purchased by the Malaysian Rubber Producers' Research Association, which changed its name in 1994 to the Tun Abdul Razak Research Centre (TARRC), a wholly owned subsidiary of the Malaysian Rubber Board. In the early 2000s, the National Sports Council of Malaysia was involved in a real estate scandal here that was eventually called the Brickendonbury Scandal. Each Summer, the Ministry of Foreign Affairs and the British Malaysian Society host the Malaysian Merdeka Day Carnival, a public celebration of Malaysia's independence that attracts thousands of attendees to the historic grounds.

== Early history ==
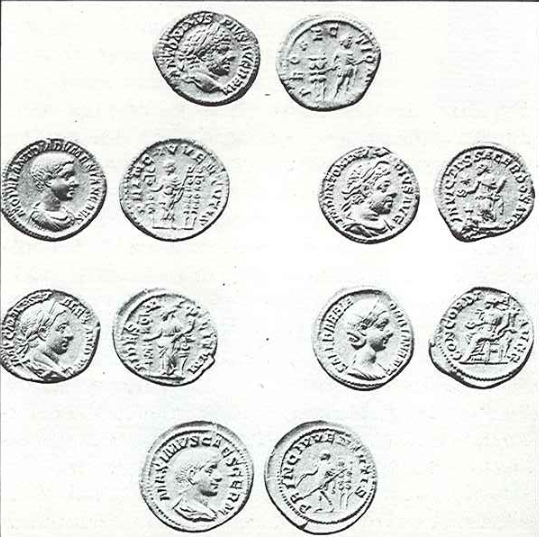
The Brickendonbury Hoard was a hoard of Roman Denarii found at the Brickendonbury Estate between 1893 and 1895.

There seems to have been activity here during the times of Roman Britain, the extent to which has not yet been determined beyond ritual wells possibly belonging to the Catuvellauni or later people groups. There are extensive Roman sites nearby, including Verulamium to the east, and Stane Street, which joined Verulamium to Camulodunum. Ermine Street, which ran from Londinium to Eboracum is also roughly a half-mile away from the Parish boundary.

Between 1893 and 1895, while conducting drainage works on the moat that surrounded the estate, 430 Roman Denarii coins were found by the property owner George Pearson and evaluated by Antiquarian archaeologists. Collectively, they were called the Brickendonbury Hoard, and they contained the likenesses of Commodus, Pertinax, Severus Alexander, Julia Domna, Caracalla, Plautilla, Geta, Diadumenian, Elagabalus, Julia Paula, Aquilia Severa, Julia Soaemias, Julia Maesa, Severus Alexander, Julia Mamaea, Orbiana, Maximinus, Maximus, Pupienus, Gordian III, Philip I, Philip II, Trajan Decius, Etruscilla, and Herennius. Soon afterwards, in February 1896, George Pearson was inducted into the Royal Numismatic Society and a paper on the finds were read aloud to the group in attendance. However, the bulk of the Brickendonbury Hoard was stolen from the Hertford Museum not long after being documented and photographed. Coins claiming to be from the Hoard occasionally appear online on coin collecting markets.

The name Brickendonbury is etymologically descended from the Saxon era, broken down into its three distinct parts: Brica, being the name of an Anglo Saxon king or nobleman; don, meaning hill; and bury, a medieval word for manor house. Hence, the name Brickendonbury means "The House at the hill belonging to Brica." Brica's estate likely stretched from the River Lea in the north, an ideal location for a mill, to the wooded lands in the south near Brickendon Brook, which would have supplied timber, fuel, and game.

== 11th century – 18th century ==
By the early 11th century, the estate was owned by the Canons of Waltham, later known as Waltham Abbey. Their possession was confirmed by Edward the Confessor in 1062 and again by Harold II before the Norman Conquest. The Domesday Book of 1086 provides a brief account of its inhabitants, who were engaged in typical medieval rural work such as cultivating crops and grazing livestock. Under Henry II, the Abbey's rights over Brickendon were reaffirmed as part of the king's atonement for the murder of Thomas Becket. This grant included special privileges relating to taxation and criminal forfeiture, creating what became known as the Liberty of Brickendon.

After the Dissolution of the Monasteries in the reign of Henry VIII, the property changed hands several times. It was first granted to Thomas Knighton of Little Bradbury in 1542, then to Edmund Allen, who sold it in 1588 to Stephen Soame (or Soames) and his son William of Suffolk for £1,000. Over the next few centuries, numerous owners and tenants occupied the estate.

=== Construction of the Brickendonbury mansion ===
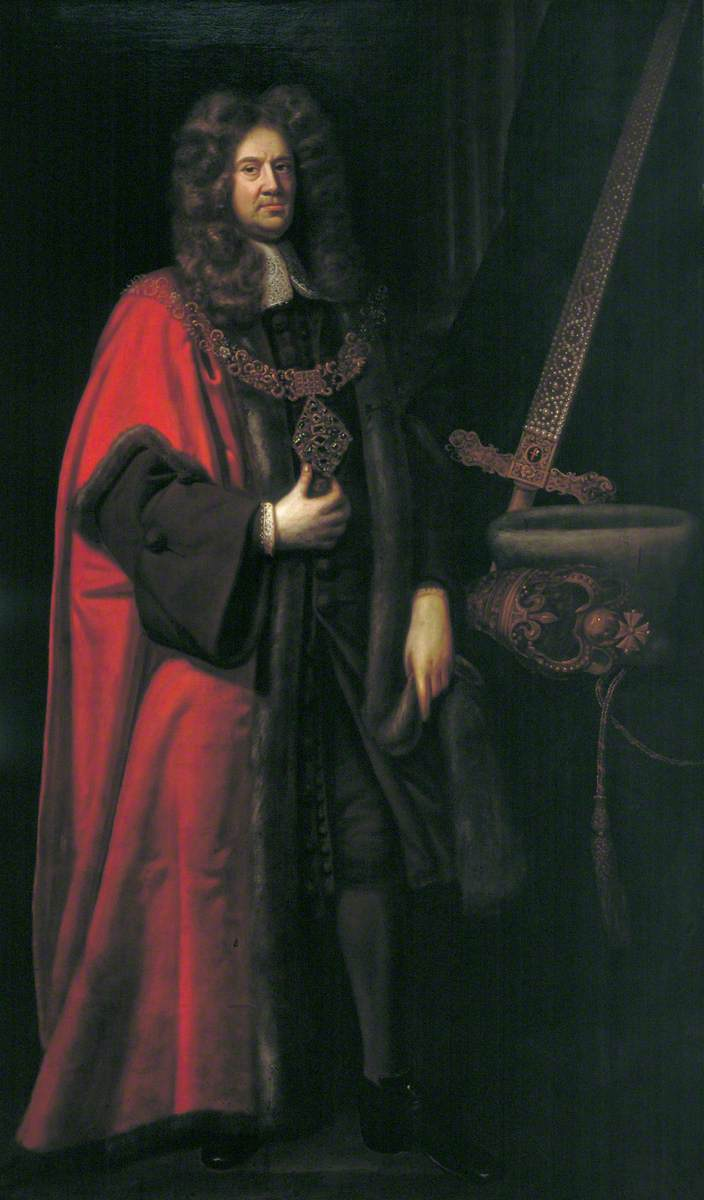
Edward Clarke, the Lord Mayor of London from 1696 to 1697, is credited with laying the foundations of the modern Brickendonbury Mansion.

In 1682, Edward Clarke, a successful London merchant originally from Leicestershire, purchased Brickendonbury from the Soame family. He was knighted in 1689, became Master of the Merchant Taylors' Company in 1690–91, and served as Lord Mayor of London in 1696. Clarke is generally credited with building the earliest and most prominent part of the present mansion at Brickendonbury.

After his death in 1703, the property descended through his family to his granddaughter Jane Morgan, and then to her daughter, also named Jane, who married Charles Gould, the Judge Advocate General and Judge Martial. Upon inheriting the estate, Gould adopted his wife's surname, becoming Charles Morgan. A portrait by Gainsborough commemorates him as a distinguished figure of his time. The Morgan family expanded the house and landscaped the grounds, establishing the tree-lined avenue now known as Morgan's Walk, which links the estate with Hertford. The last member of the family to live at Brickendonbury was George Gould Morgan, who died there in 1845.

== 19th century ==
For roughly four decades following the mid-19th century, Brickendonbury was leased to a succession of tenants, the most prominent being Russell Ellice, Chairman of the East India Company in 1853 and a Director from 1831 until his death at the estate in 1873. His association with the company marked the first documented link between Brickendonbury and Southeast Asia.

By the late 1870s, the Morgan family had divested their interest in the property, selling it off in stages between 1878 and 1883. During this period, the estate was reduced in size, lost its status as a liberty, and the lordship title was also sold.

Subsequently, the estate was purchased by Charles Grey Hill, a lace merchant from Nottingham, who died before taking up residence. In 1893, George Pearson acquired the mansion and its remaining 1,000 acres for £30,000. By then, both the house and grounds fell into disrepair. George Pearson and his son, Sir Edward Pearson, were partners in S. Pearson & Sons, a major civil engineering firm responsible for constructing the Great Northern and City Railway, today forming the southern section of the Northern City Line, which passes across former estate land. The modern media corporation Pearson plc, publisher of the Financial Times, traces its origins to this same company.

== Pearson renovations, farm and gardens ==
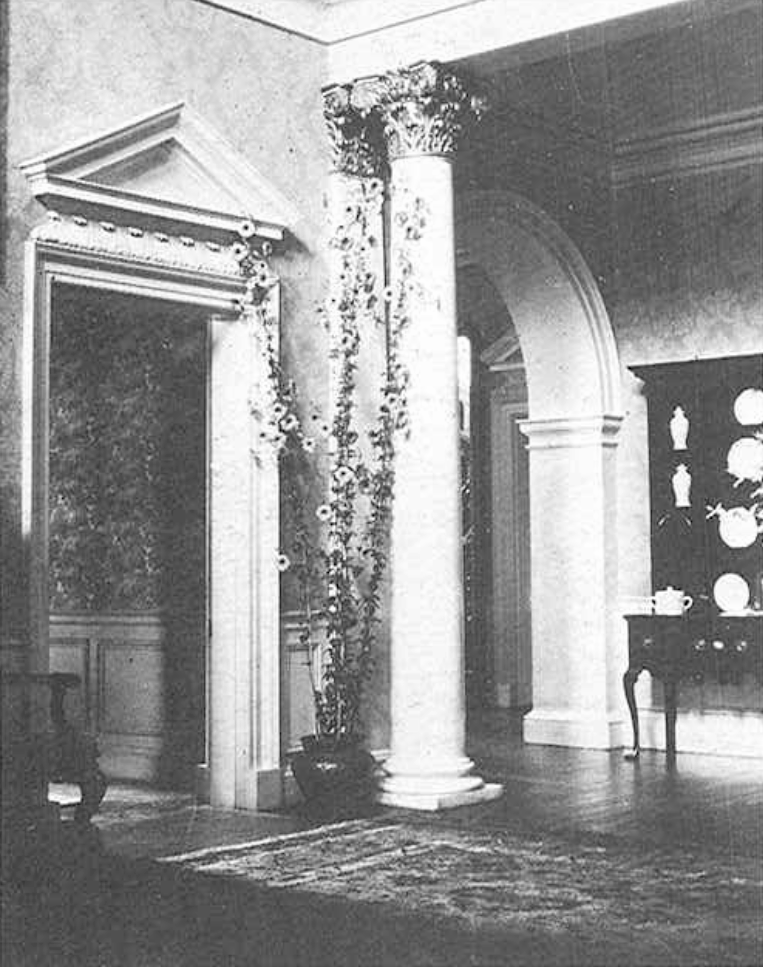
The interior of the Brickendonbury Mansion as it appeared in the late 1920s.

Following George Pearson's death in 1902, the estate passed to his son, Sir Edward Ernest Pearson, a civil engineer who also held several local offices, including Justice of the Peace for Hertfordshire, High Sheriff in 1909, and Mayor of Hertford for three years. Sir Edward was known for his commitment to agricultural science and modernization. At Brickendonbury, he implemented progressive farming methods based on soil analysis conducted by Dr. Augustus Voelcker & Sons and pursued advanced crop cultivation techniques. He also raised a stud of Shire horses, and herds of Dairy Shorthorn and Devon cattle.

To support these agricultural efforts, a dairy, constructed in 1900 and inspired by the design of the royal dairy at Sandringham, supplied produce for the household and surrounding estate. Later, the lodges, cottages, and Home Farm were redeveloped, and part of the farm site was eventually adapted for use as scientific laboratories, continuing the estate's long association with applied science and experimentation.

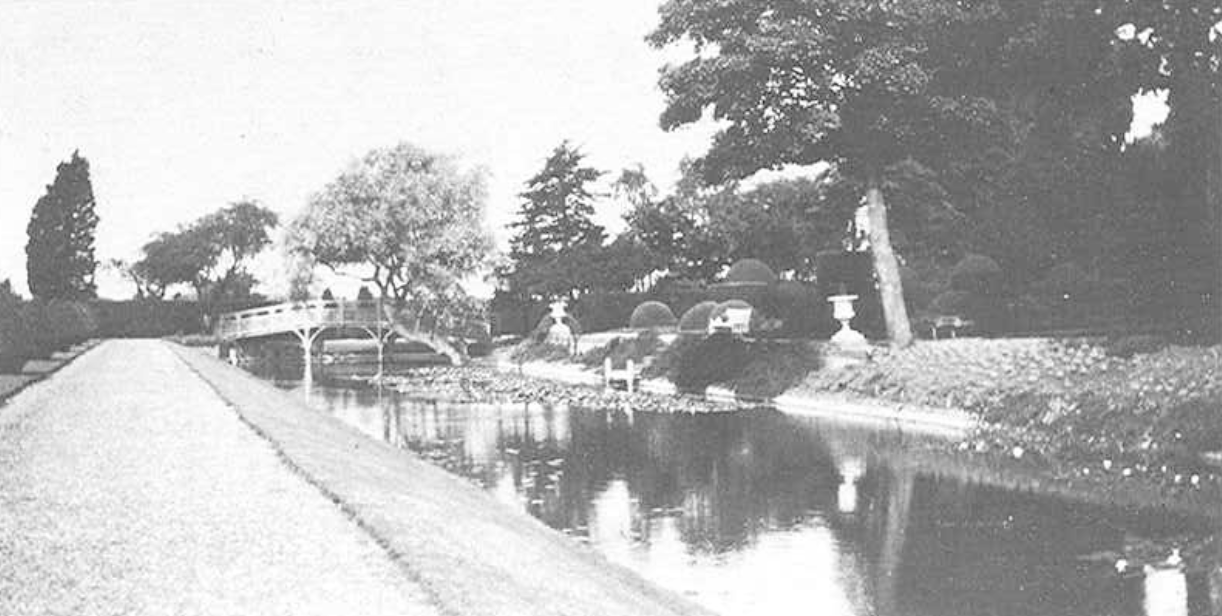
The footbridge over the moat at Brickendonbury as it appeared in the late 1920's. The bridge has since been removed.

The Pearson family significantly altered the appearance and layout of Brickendonbury during their ownership. They extended the mansion by rebuilding the west end of the south front, adding an additional storey, and in 1919 constructing a Jacobean-style banqueting hall, which now serves as the estate's conference room.

The gardens were also redesigned and enhanced. At the end of the moat, an ornamental rock garden was created using Pulhamite, an artificial stone developed by the firm Pulham and Son, renowned "Garden Craftsmen" based in Oxford Street, London. The company held Royal Warrants as gardeners to King Edward VII and King George V. At the time, Brickendonbury's head gardener, R. Smith, was regarded as one of Britain's leading fruit growers. A 1909 feature in The Gardeners' Magazine praised the estate for "the extent, beauty, and high keeping of its gardens", noting its national reputation for horticultural excellence.

== Stratton Park School ==
Following Sir Edward Pearson's death in 1925, Lady Pearson moved away from Brickendonbury, and in 1933 she leased the grounds to Stratton Park School, a private preparatory school of around fifty boys that had moved from Great Brickhill in Buckinghamshire. Two traces of this period remain visible today: the former banqueting hall, used as the school gymnasium, still bears ceiling hooks for climbing ropes, and the outdoor swimming pool, renovated in later years.

The school uniform consisted of grey fabric trimmed with dark green piping. The dormitories were spread across two floors and named after notable British naval and military leaders; Nelson, Collingwood, Hood, Drake, and Wellington. Each Saturday morning, pupils were required to sit mock examinations to build familiarity with formal testing, while Sundays were reserved for writing letters home. School outings and field trips included visits to Vauxhall Motors and Whipsnade Zoo.

The school was well-equipped for recreation, with a billiards table and suits of armour displayed in the entrance hall. Sports played an important role: older boys competed in rugby, younger ones in football, and all participated in cricket. There was also a swimming pool and a rifle range where boys were trained to handle .22 rifles. The manor's conference room still bears a trace of this period—hooks in the ceiling once used for ropes in what had been the school gymnasium.

During the Munich Crisis of September 1938, an air raid trench was dug in front of the school, and by 1939, staff members were taking turns standing guard from the mansion's tower with rifles in case of a German paratrooper landing. Declining enrolment at the start of World War II coincided with the sale of the Brickendonbury estate by Lady Pearson around 1939. That same year, the school relocated—along with most of its pupils—to Benington House at Hebing End near Stevenage, where it continued as Stratton-Stanmore Park School under headmaster Donald MacDonald.

In the late 1930s, Lady Pearson sold the Brickendonbury estate to Ernest Gocher, a businessman from Roydon. However, he never occupied the property, as it was requisitioned by the British government at the outbreak of the Second World War in 1939. Contemporary accounts suggest that Lady Pearson herself may have alerted the authorities to the estate's availability for wartime use.

Although Kelly's Directory for 1943 still listed the Stratton Park School at Brickendonbury, records indicate that it vacated the premises in the autumn of 1940. The mansion, four cottages, and associated buildings were officially requisitioned by the Office of Works on 12 July 1940 under the Emergency Powers (Defence) Act 1939, followed by the remainder of the estate on 25 July.

== School for Destruction ==
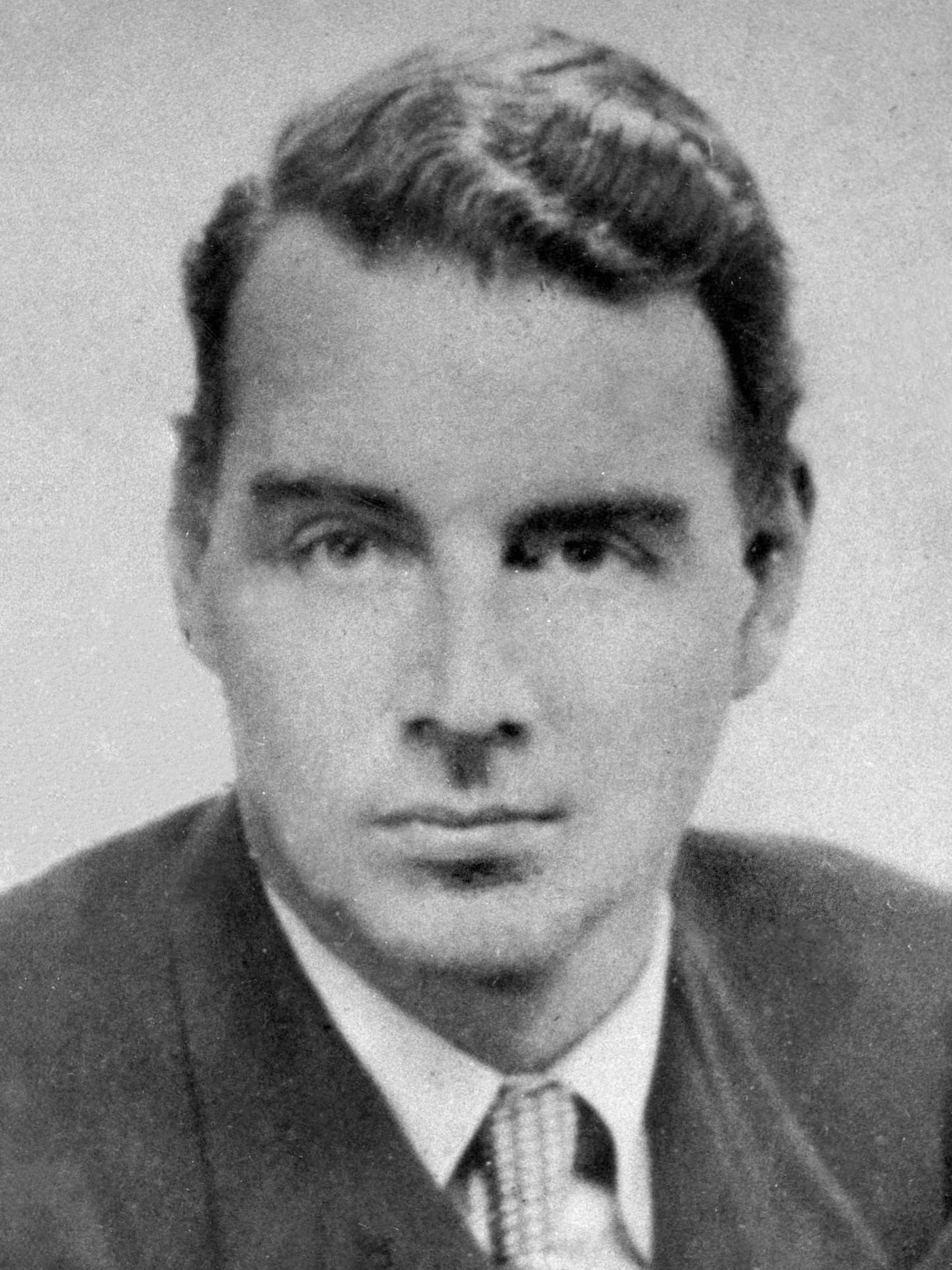
Guy Burgess was the first schoolmaster of the School for Destruction. He was later arrested for drunk driving and relieved of command.

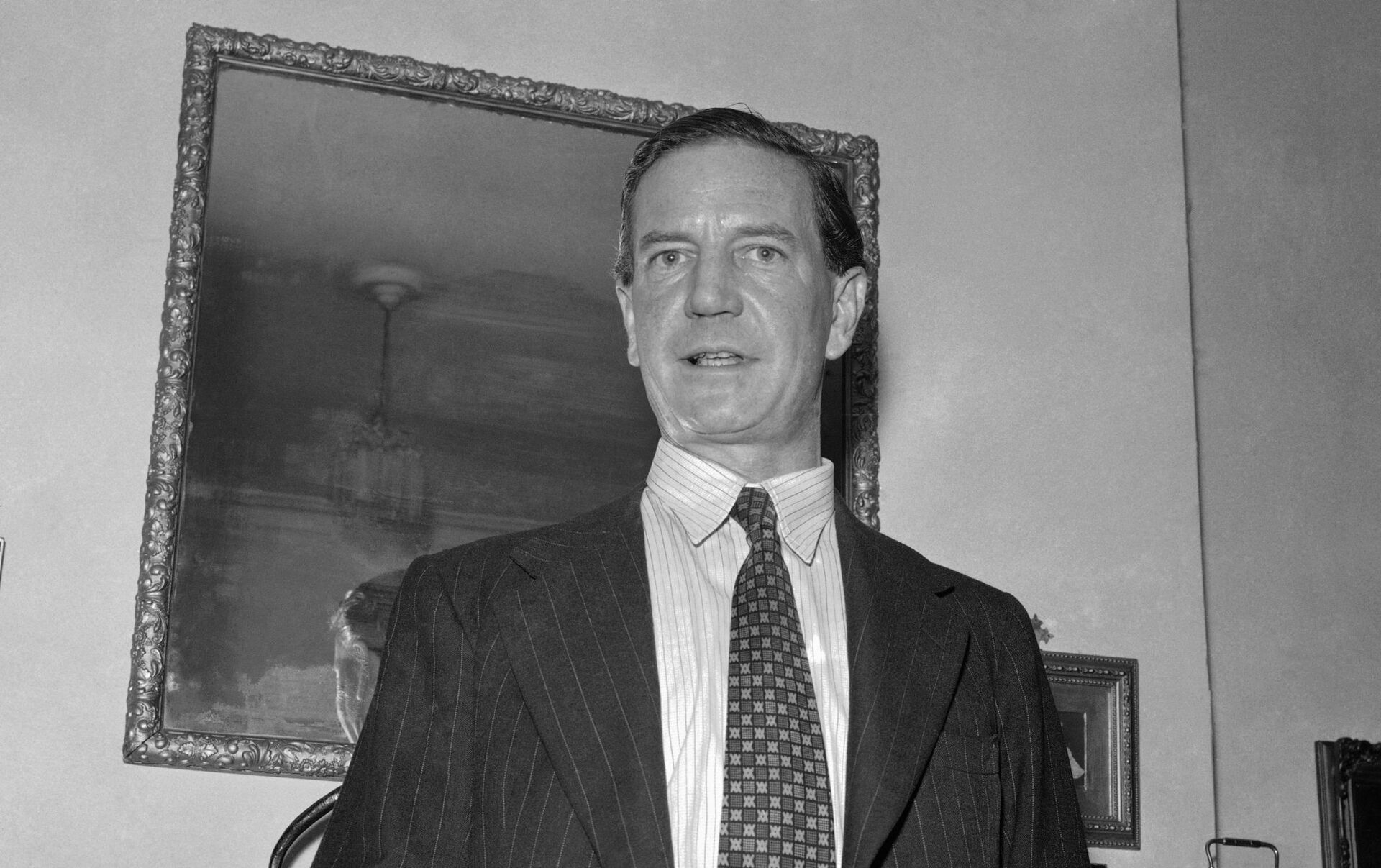
Kim Philby helped Burgess run the first batch of students through the schoolhouse.

(Both of these men were later revealed to be Soviet spies).

During World War II, Brickendonbury became the first British school for guerrilla and irregular warfare, initially operated by the Section for Destruction (Section D), under the command of Laurence Grand, of the Secret Intelligence Service (SIS). After the outbreak of war, the evacuation of British diplomats from Czechoslovakia and Poland severely diminished Britain's intelligence presence in Eastern Europe. It also subsequently led to the withdrawal of secret missions as German occupation spread through the continent. Many local SIS agents were left without funds or means to transmit intelligence; although neutral diplomatic missions, notably those of the United States and Switzerland, sometimes acted on Britain's behalf, SIS confronted a significant operational gap.

In response to these losses, D Section officer Guy Burgess proposed establishing a specialised training facility to prepare agents for infiltration, intelligence gathering, and the organisation of resistance behind enemy lines. In late 1939 the government requisitioned Brickendonbury Manor for this purpose. Burgess's proposed name for the school, the Guy Fawkes School, was discarded; the facility became known as the School for Destruction (D School). On paper, it was called Station XVII. Its commanding officer was Frederick Peters from the Royal Navy, with Burgess serving as his deputy. Kim Philby, another former Cambridge contemporary of Burgess and an SIS officer, was responsible for the school's syllabus. (Both Burgess and Philby were later revealed to have been Soviet agents.)

Philby had only recently been recruited into the service himself. He was viewed as an ideal candidate; fluent in German, well-travelled, and socially well connected. Valentine Vivian, a senior SIS officer, was personally acquainted with Philby's father, which further strengthened his suitability. Philby left The Times as a reporter in August 1940 to join the school at Brickendonbury. Here, he worked alongside George Hill, a seasoned intelligence officer who had served during the First World War and the Russian Civil War, and had previously recruited Lucy and Peggy Lunn to assist his courier network in Moscow. By this time, Hill was no longer the vigorous field operative of earlier years; Philby admired his record but described him as balding and heavily built.

Sue RyderTraining at Brickendonbury combined physical conditioning, weapons handling, and tradecraft with instruction in sabotage as an instrument of unconventional warfare. Course material drew on contemporary lessons in clandestine organisation, including the cell structures associated with communist groups and the guerrilla techniques used by the Irish Republican Army.

After Section D was absorbed into the Special Operations Executive (SOE) in 1940, the School for Destruction was renamed as STS 17, and it served as part of the organisation's European operations. Under the administration of the newly established SOE, STS 17 functioned as the SOE's principal training establishment for explosives and industrial sabotage. The site prepared resistance operatives from occupied Europe for parachute insertion by teaching them techniques for destroying transport and infrastructure, ranging from trains to bridges, and included a designated demolition research area within the grounds.

Colin Gubbins chose as his primary instructor at STS 17 a man named George Rheam.

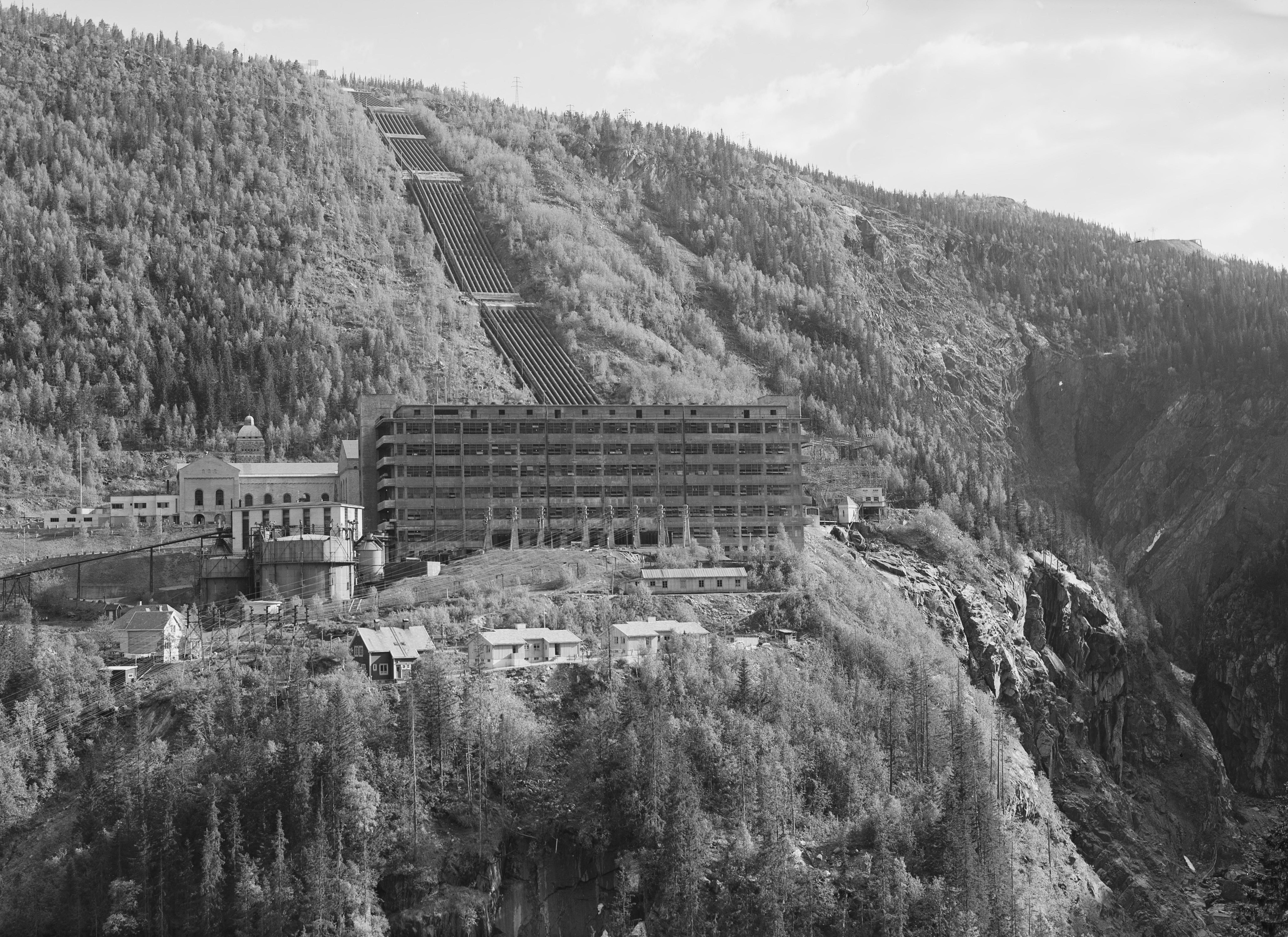
The SOE's Norsk portions of the Norwegian heavy water sabotage were planned and tested at Brickendonbury.

It was primarily used for the training of agents and resistance operatives in industrial sabotage and covert warfare. Several important missions were prepared here, including the sabotage of the Norwegian heavy water plant, an operation that hindered Germany's atomic research. Practical preparation at Station XVII also included construction of full-scale practice targets, including the Norsk power plant. After the Norwegians were trained initially in Scotland, they came to Brickendonbury where a full-scale model of Norsk Hydro was sitting on the grounds, and they drilled by assaulting the mock-up. When they were deemed ready for the operation, the team of six Norwegian Operation Gunnerside commandos, under the command of Captain Leif Tronstad and Joachim Rønneberg, left from Brickendonbury a week before Christmas 1942.

The bombing of the Renault engineering works in France was also planned here.

Candidates underwent an initial assessment followed by intensive paramilitary instruction covering demolitions, weapons handling, small-unit tactics, intelligence tradecraft, communications, and parachute training. Successful trainees progressed to the "Finishing School" at Balieu that concentrated on clandestine techniques, propaganda, the organisation of resistance, and the local political and social conditions relevant to their destination.

The estate also hosted explosive trials: among the devices developed and tested there was the limpet mine, an attachable magnetic naval charge associated with inventor Stuart Macrae and later used operationally by SOE. Evidence of these activities resurfaced in 1973, when builders draining the moat uncovered unexploded hand grenades and live mortar shells, remnants of Brickendonbury's covert past.

== Postwar years and Modern era ==
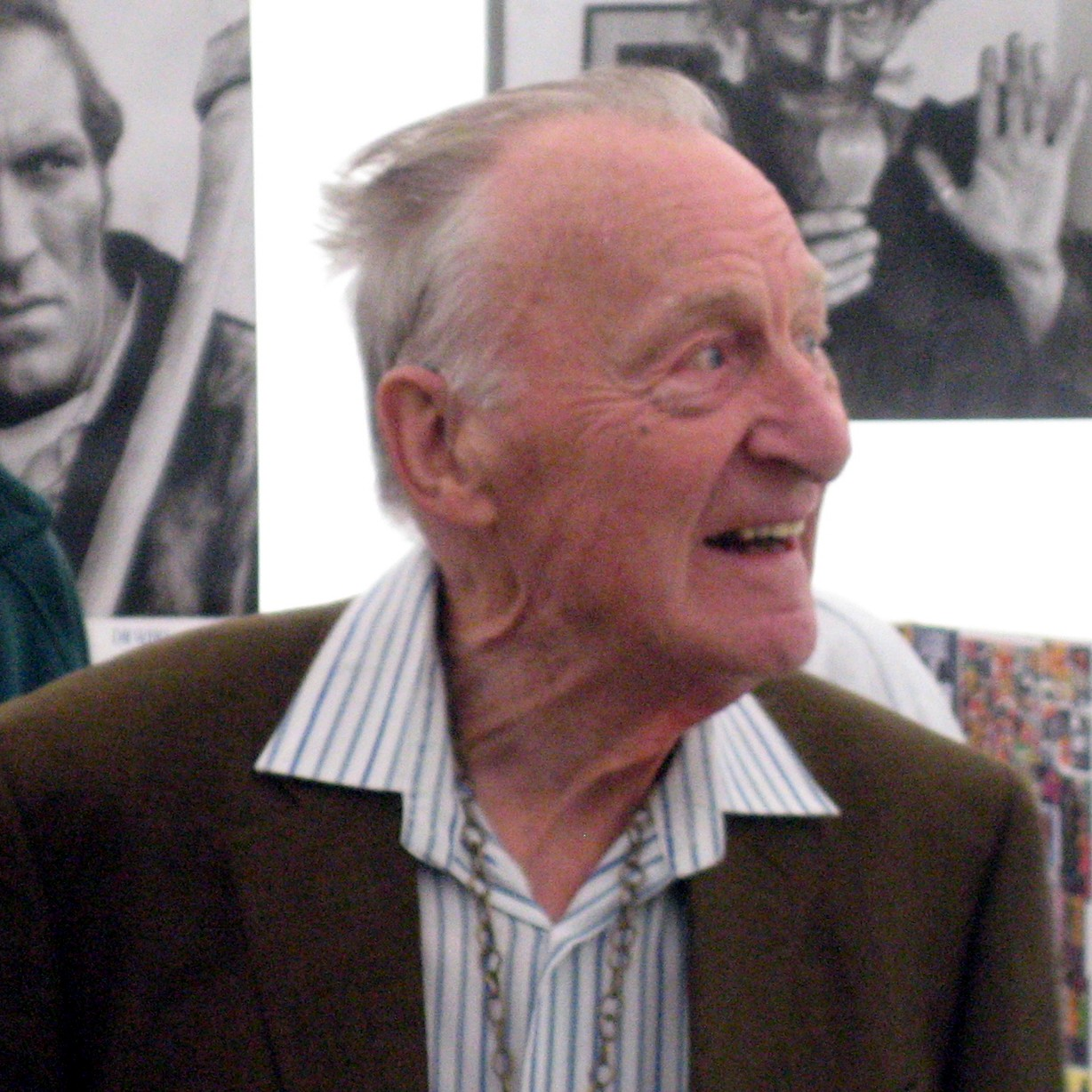
Geoffrey Bayldon starred as the main character of Catweazle, a time traveling wizard.

Following the war, Brickendonbury returned to civilian use. The mansion served as offices for the Hertfordshire County Council's Highways Department and later accommodated the National Agricultural Advisory Service and the War Agricultural Executive. During this period, the estate's grounds fell into neglect, and the building's interior was repainted in the standard government beige typical of the era. Just before its restoration by the Malaysian Rubber Producers' Research Association in 1971, the property was used as a filming location for the children's television series Catweazle.

In subsequent decades, Brickendonbury was revitalized as the site of the Tun Abdul Razak Research Centre (TARRC), a major rubber research laboratory. The mansion was carefully restored to provide functional yet elegant office and meeting spaces, while the surrounding grounds were rehabilitated. Purpose-built laboratories, a mill room, a library, and development facilities were added, many of them integrated behind the preserved façade of the Pearsons' model farm, which still bears the family motto: "Do it with thy might."

In the early 2000s, the Malaysian government entertained notions to establish a sports complex at the estate called the Brickendonbury Sports High-Performance Training Centre (HPTC), which would have costed approximately 70 million RM, and would have required the destruction of several historic buildings on the site. The East Herts Council government rejected the Malaysian application, noting that proper environmental surveys had not been performed, and the sports complex was not constructed. The Malaysian Minister of Youth and Sports at the time, Azalina Othman Said, was caught in the middle of a scandal with the Malaysian press wondering where the money that had already been allocated to the site had gone, and Malaysians called on her to resign. These events came to be known as the Brickendonbury Scandal.

As of 2016, restoration work continued, including the reinstatement of the original cast-iron balcony on the south front. Today, the estate serves both scientific and community purposes. In addition to housing TARRC and Rubber Consultants, it hosts conferences, training sessions, and private events such as wedding receptions.

== In popular culture ==
- The estate's wartime role later featured in the television documentary The Secret War, which included archival footage of training exercises conducted on the grounds.
