= Joan Bright Astley =

British civil servant (1910–2008)

OBE Joan Bright Astley
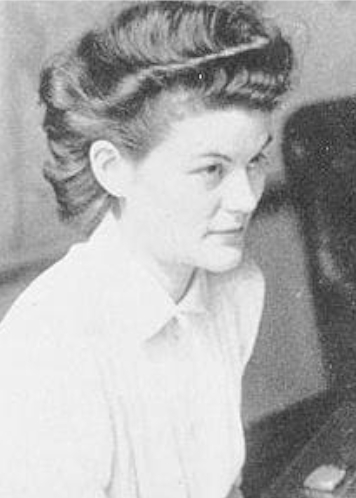

Administrative Officer for British Delegations
- In office 1943–1946
- Prime Minister: Winston Churchill
- Delegations: Third Washington Conference; First Quebec Conference; Tehran Conference; Second Quebec Conference; Yalta Conference; Potsdam Conference

Director of the Secret Intelligence Centre at the Cabinet War Rooms
- In office 1941–1943
- Prime Minister: Winston Churchill
- Supervisor: Hastings Ismay, 1st Baron Ismay

Secretarial Typist for the Department of Military Intelligence (Research)
- In office 1939–1940
- Supervisor: John Charles Francis Holland

Personal details
- Born: 27 September 1910 Monte Caseros, Corrientes, Argentina
- Died: 24 December 2008 (aged 98) London, England
- Education: Mrs Hoster's Secretarial College

Military service
- Branch/service: War Office; Directorate of Military Intelligence; Special Operations Executive
- Battles/wars: World War II

Joan Bright Astley, OBE (27 September 1910 – 24 December 2008), born Penelope Joan McKerrow Bright, was a British intelligence officer and organizer during World War II. After 1939, she was directly involved in the planning and oversight stages of nearly every important action of the European Theatre of the Second World War. She worked directly for the director of paramilitary operations, Jo Holland, and later for the Chief of Staff for Defence, Hastings Ismay. She was one of the co-founders of the Special Operations Executive (SOE). She organized the Special Information Centre (SIC) for Winston Churchill during World War II. Her ability to keep secrets made her in exceptionally high demand as a personal assistant, and she was regarded by Winston Churchill to be exceptionally intelligent. She briefly dated Ian Fleming and is believed to be one of the three or four women whose attributes were used by him for the character of Miss Moneypenny. She held a high-ranking position for the British missions to the Yalta Conference, the Tehran Conference, the Second Quebec Conference, and the Potsdam Conference, among others.

== Biography ==
=== Early life ===
Joan Bright Astley was born in Monte Caseros, Corrientes, Argentina. Her father was an English accountant; her mother, a Scottish governess. Described as a difficult teenager, she attended a number of schools, including Mrs Hoster's Secretarial College, where she learned shorthand and typing, and went on to working as a secretary at the British legation in Mexico. In 1936, she was offered a job, which she declined, in Nazi Germany, teaching English to the family of Rudolf Hess.

=== Career as Military Intelligence officer ===
In 1939, she was told by a friend that she might have a chance of work if she went to a certain London Underground station one day, wearing a pink carnation. She did so and was guided to an office in Whitehall where she was met by a colonel, who had her sign the Official Secrets Act and warned her not to be seen by a certain person standing outside the building when she left. She was hired by the Department of Military Intelligence (Research), or simply MI(R), a section of the War Office concerned, among other things, with disrupting the flow of Romanian oil to the Third Reich. She was in fact the first hire at MI(R), when it was still called GS(R), serving under John Charles Francis Holland as his secretarial typist during the research phase of the department. Notably, on one occasion, she had to duck when Holland absentmindedly threw a book across the room out of frustration with his superiors at the War Office.

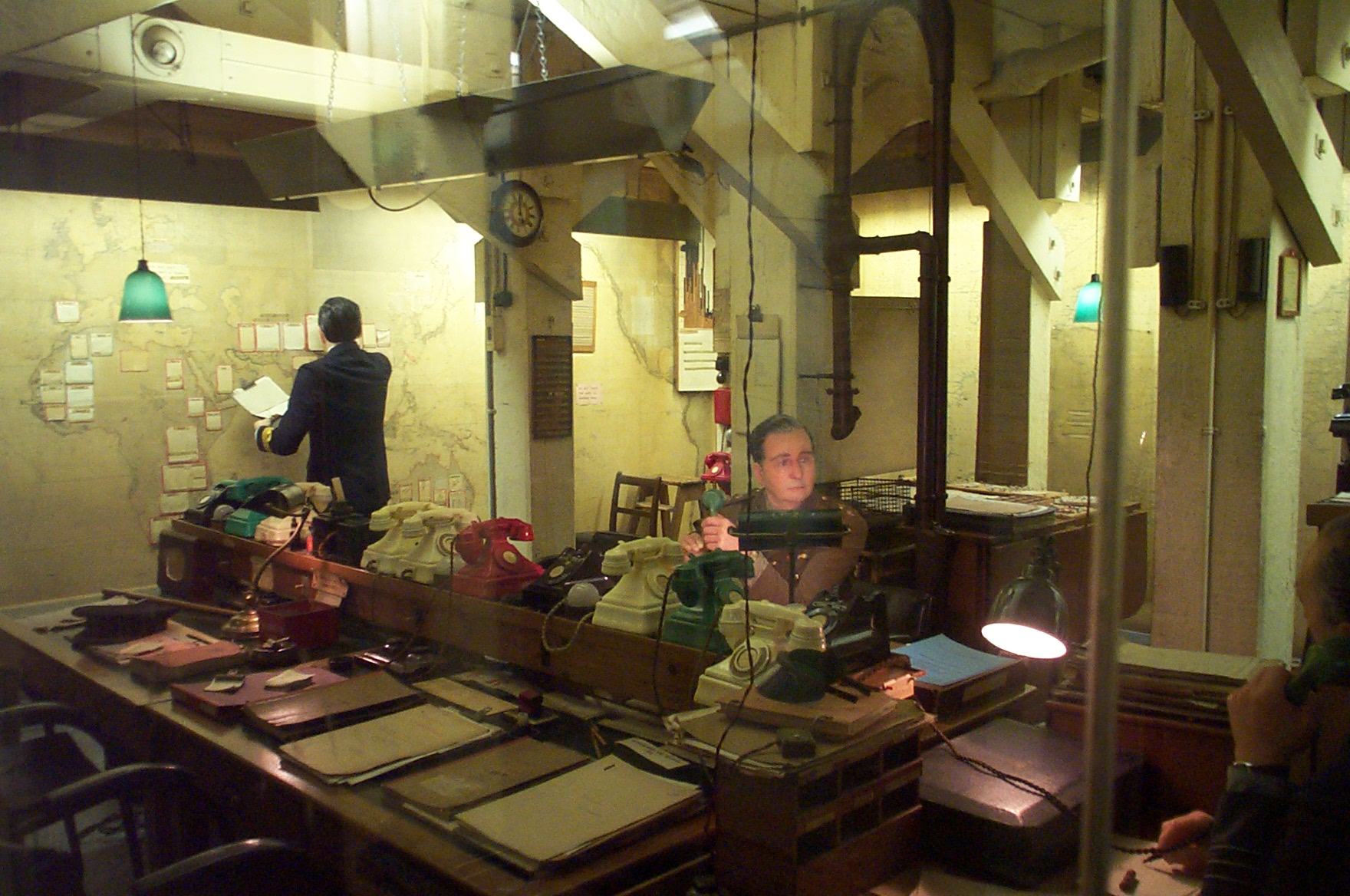
The Cabinet War Rooms underneath London, where Astley was in charge of the Secret Intelligence Centre.

In 1940, when MI(R) was merged into the Special Operations Executive (SOE), Bright stayed-on at the War Office. Later in the war, in 1941, she was employed by the Joint Planning Committee and given the job of running the Secret Intelligence Centre, which was in fact a single room in the Cabinet War Rooms. She had custody of secret papers and reports and, on instructions, would show a given report to a senior officer and allow him to read it in her office, under top secret conditions. She later recalled that the only sounds in those underground corridors were the steady tapping of typewriters and the low hum of air-conditioning fans. A noticeboard indicated whether the weather above ground was fine, wet, or windy, while red and green lights signaled whether an air raid was in progress or not. By all accounts, she made the officers welcome with her informal manner. Among the visitors was General Archibald Wavell, who became a personal friend.

Subsequently, she became personal assistant to General Sir Hastings Ismay, Winston Churchill's Chief of Staff for Defence. The following year, in 1942, Wavell requested that Bright be sent to India to establish a similar secretariat. Ismay refused the request.

During the war, she dated Ian Fleming, and said of him, "I thought he was awfully attractive and fun, but elusive. I think he was a ruthless man – he would drop somebody if he didn't want them any more. That would be it." She added, "No torrid love affair."

=== Career as Administrative Officer for British Delegations ===
In the spring of 1943 General Ismay selected her to serve as an Administrative Officer with the senior British delegation during its meetings with American officials in Washington that summer. This was the first of six major conferences in which she served as the Administrative Officer. Bright’s duties at these conferences included arranging accommodation, furnishing living quarters, equipping offices, issuing passes, and meeting the often extensive needs of the British delegates.

At the Yalta Conference, she also had to navigate both the Soviet bureaucracy and harsh winter conditions. Her work brought her into close contact with many of the leading military figures of the war.

During the journey to the Quebec Conference, General Sir Alan Brooke expressed irritation at being assigned a railway compartment directly above the wheels, while Wing Commander Guy Gibson grew despondent about being separated from his men and burdened by an impending lecture tour. “They’ve taken away my name,” he confided to her. “It’s ‘dam buster’ here and ‘dam buster’ there.”

In 1944, following the delegation’s return from Moscow, the British representatives were pleasantly surprised to receive several crates containing 200 bottles of champagne, 30 bottles of vodka, and a few tins of caviar, a gift they quickly consumed. About a week later, Bright intercepted an urgent telephone inquiry from a Soviet military mission asking about missing supplies intended for their Red Army Day celebration. To smooth over the misunderstanding, Foreign Secretary Anthony Eden promptly sent a conciliatory gift to the Russians consisting of six dozen bottles of whisky and 1,000 cigarettes.

At the final wartime conference in Potsdam, Bright visited the ruins of Hitler’s Chancellery in Berlin. She later recalled being free to wander through the debris, examining scattered papers, furniture fragments, and piles of newly minted Iron Cross medals strewn across the floors. The atmosphere, she wrote, was grim and haunting, a reflection of the city’s devastation.

=== Postwar years ===
She was appointed Officer of the Order of the British Empire (OBE) in the 1946 New Year Honours, when she was described as "Principal, Offices of the Cabinet and Minister of Defence." In 1949, she married Colonel Philip Astley, first husband of Madeleine Carroll, whom he had divorced in 1940. Colonel Astley died in 1958. In 1971, Joan Astley wrote of her wartime life in a memoir, The Inner Circle: a View of War at the Top, and in 1993 co-authored a book on Sir Colin Gubbins.

Shortly before her death, she gave a signed copy of The Inner Circle to Anthony Horowitz, and expressed her desires that he not pursue the publication of any book or series about the SOE.

She died on Christmas Eve 2008 aged 98.

== Influence on Miss Moneypenny ==
According to Samantha Weinberg, author of The Moneypenny Diaries, which she published under the name Kate Westbrook, Astley is one of three or four women used by Fleming as the basis of Miss Moneypenny.

== In popular culture ==
- In 2021, it was announced that Joan Bright Astley would be portrayed by Jenna Coleman in a show called The War Rooms.

== Sources ==
- Bailey, Roderick (11 March 2009). "Obituary". The Guardian.
- Giles Milton The Ministry of Ungentlemanly Warfare, 2016, John Murray. ISBN 978-1-444-79895-1
