= Norman Crockatt =

British intelligence officer and head of MI9 (1894–1956)

C.B.E. Norman Crockatt
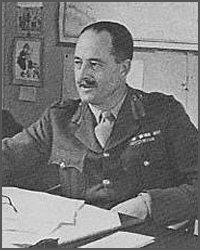

Deputy Director of Military Intelligence and Prisoners of War, War Office
- In office 12 December 1941 – 1945
- Appointed by: Joint Intelligence Committee
- Prime Minister: Winston Churchill

Director of Military Intelligence Section 9
- In office 23 December 1939 – 1945
- Appointed by: Joint Intelligence Committee
- Prime Minister: Winston Churchill
- Minister: Hugh Dalton
- Succeeded by: Sam Derry

Personal details
- Born: 12 April 1894 India, British Raj
- Died: 9 October 1956 (aged 62) Surrey, England
- Education: Rugby School
- Alma mater: Royal Military College at Sandhurst
- Awards: Distinguished Service Order; Military Cross; Order of the Nile; Legion of Merit; Legion d'honneur (Chevalier); Croix de Guerre (with palm)

Military service
- Branch/service: Royal Scots; Royal Company of Archers; Directorate of Military Intelligence
- Rank: Brigadier
- Battles/wars: World War I; France; Sinai and Palestine campaign; World War II

Norman Richard Crockatt was a lifelong British Army officer who during the Interwar period was the head of the London Stock Exchange. Most notably, during World War II, he was the head of Military Intelligence Section 9 (MI9), of the British Directorate of Military Intelligence. MI9 was the section of MI responsible for the escape and evasion of Allied prisoners of war (POWs). Crockatt himself had implemented a rule of escape-mindedness during the war. He encouraged all POWs to survive and escape at all costs. Despite this, he is also partially-responsible for one of the most controversial orders during the war, called the "Stay Put Order", which caused several thousand POWs to lose their lives. Intelligence historians often note the irony in Crockatt encouraging individual POWs to escape, but discouraging mass breakouts. Throughout the war, Crockatt also used POWs to gather intelligence on the Axis, taking advantage of their unique positions behind enemy lines. Crockatt is directly responsible for the escape and survival of tens of thousands of Allied POWs during the war.

The historian Michael Foot, in his history of MI9, writes:

The directing genius of Norman Crockatt, founder of MI9 and its head for most of the 1939-45 war, can be traced – even if only indirectly – behind almost all of the mid-century adventures this book recalls.

== Biography ==
=== Early life ===
Crockatt, according to his military and baptismal records, was born in India during the rule of India by the British Raj. However, at a young age he was living in mainland England and enrolled at the prestigious Rugby School.

=== World War I ===
During World War I, Crockatt served as a regular infantry officer fighting on the front line in France, where he earned both the Distinguished Service Order and the Military Cross. However, he was also severely wounded there and transferred to staff, serving as a Brigade major. Despite the fact that his transfer was meant for recovery, his new position was far more exposed. Serving in the trenches of France, he was wounded again during the Retreat from Mons. He was then transferred to Palestine, where he was severely wounded again. After peace was declared, Crockatt remained in the Army for nearly another decade.

=== Interwar Years ===
By 1927, however, Crockatt had become dissatisfied with his life in the Army. In the middle of his enrollment at the British Army Staff College, he got up and left, tendering his resignation. He wound up working in the Square Mile as a professional stockbroker. During the interwar period, he did well in the financial world, becoming the head of the London Stock Exchange.

=== World War II ===
Following the outbreak of World War II, in September 1939, Crockatt recommissioned into the military. Within two months, the Joint Intelligence Committee (JIC) had appointed him to become the head of Military Intelligence Section 9 (MI9), a brand new section of the Directorate of Military Intelligence. This was on the advice of Joe Holland, the head of MI-R and the creator of the British Commandos. Holland and Crockatt had by this point known each other for over 30 years, and had been childhood friends.

In 1940, Crockatt gave advice and consent to Colin Gubbins during the creation of the Special Operations Executive (SOE). SOE and MI9 were intricately linked during the war, and the two men shared intelligence and even staff members, such as Charles Fraser-Smith.

In 1941, when restructuring efforts took place, Crockatt became the commander of A. R. Rawlinson during the creation of MI19.

In 1942, Crockatt took over the command of the American intelligence officer William Stull Holt, who had been assigned as the liaison officer to MI9 from the newly established MIS-X.

In 1943, Crockatt was promoted to brigadier.

In June 1943, Crockatt made a decision considered controversial. When the Allies were advancing northward through Italy, Crockatt and his colleague Claude Dansey clashed greatly over what to do about the 80,000 Allied POWs being held in Italy when the Italians fled their posts. Ultimately, neither man could determine that they had the capability to manage that many POWs fleeing at once, and Crockatt issued the controversial "Stay Put Order". This order, communicated to POWs via secret coded messages, instructed all POWs being held in Italy to stay at their prisons and wait for the Allies to arrive. However, the Germans arrived in Italy and brought the prisoners further into Nazi territory.

It was not until 1944 that members of the press were even made aware of the existence of MI9, when Crockatt gave a secret press conference in London to explain what the agency did.

=== Postwar years and death ===
At the cessation of hostilities and the Surrender of Japan which concluded the war, Crockatt retired for a second time from the Army, and handed over the functioning of MI9 to Sam Derry. Crockatt was then made its regimental colonel (a ceremonial role) of the Royal Scots for a full decade after the war. Crockatt founded a dining club, called the 9/19 Dining Club, which held an annual dinner for the former members of MI9 and MI19. This dining club, however, folded only a few years after Crockatt's death.
