= Caxton Street =

Street in the City of Westminster, England

Coordinates: 51.49855°N 0.13498°W

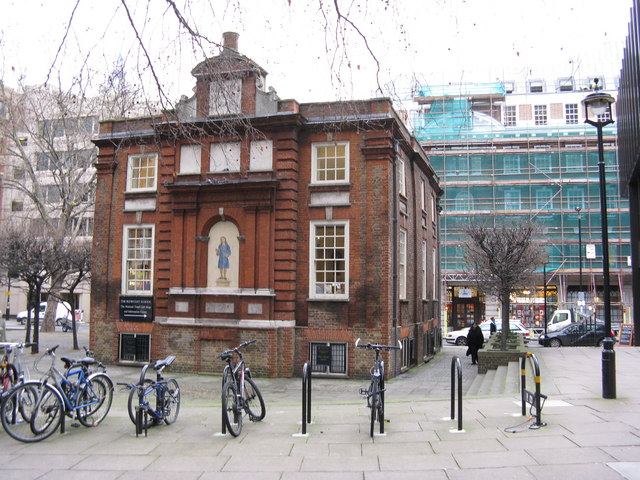
Blewcoat School

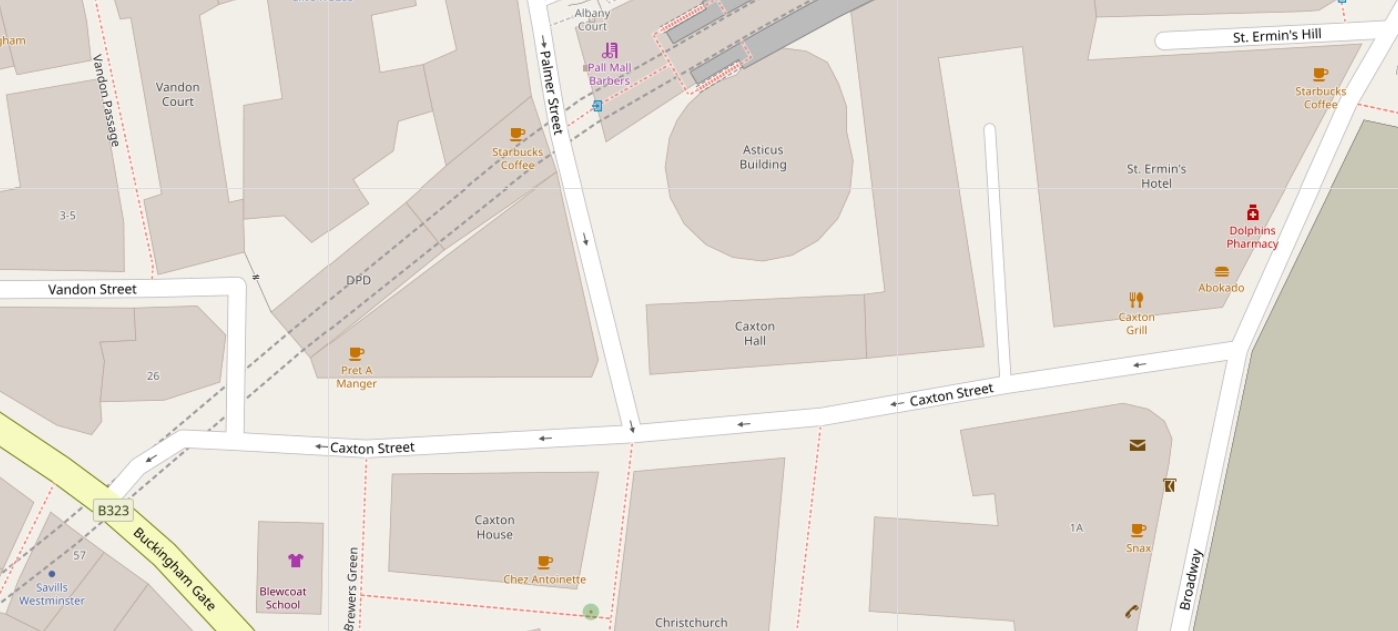
Map of Caxton Street

Caxton Street is a street in the City of Westminster that runs between Buckingham Gate in the west and Broadway in the east. It is joined on the north side by Vandon Street and crossed by Palmer Street.

The street was once named Little Chapel Street.

The street is named after William Caxton, who introduced the printing press to England. Caxton had worked near the site of the street in the almonry of Westminster Abbey.

It is the location of the grade I listed Blewcoat School, grade II listed Caxton Hall, and previously, the National Map Centre.

Alliance House, an eight-storey office block at number 12, on the corner with Palmer Street, opened in November 1938, with the demolition of the Westminster Hospital Medical School building, site clearance and construction, all being completed in under 12 months. It is the headquarters of the United Kingdom Alliance temperance movement, with a large meeting room, Alliance Hall, and much of the building let to other companies.

St Ermin's Hotel was a meeting place of the British intelligence services, notably the birthplace of the Special Operations Executive (SOE), and where notorious Cambridge Five double agents Kim Philby and Donald Maclean met their Russian handlers.
