= Special Operations Executive =

British World War II espionage and sabotage organisation

- Active: 22 July 1940 – 15 January 1946
- Country: United Kingdom
- Type: Special forces
- Role: Espionage; Irregular warfare (especially sabotage and raiding operations); Special reconnaissance
- Size: Approximately 13,000 employees
- Part of: Ministry of Economic Warfare
- Nicknames: "The Baker Street Irregulars" "Churchill's Secret Army" "Ministry of Ungentlemanly Warfare"

Commanders
- Notable commanders: Frank Nelson; Charles Jocelyn Hambro; Colin Gubbins

Special Operations Executive (SOE) was a British organisation formed in 1940 to conduct espionage, sabotage and reconnaissance in German-occupied Europe and to aid local resistance movements during World War II. SOE personnel operated in all territories occupied or attacked by the Axis powers, except where demarcation lines were agreed upon with Britain's principal allies, the United States and the Soviet Union. SOE made use of neutral territory on occasion or made plans and preparations in case neutral countries were attacked by the Axis. The organisation directly employed or controlled more than 13,000 people, of whom 3,200 were women. Both men and women served as agents in Axis-occupied countries.

The organisation was dissolved in 1946. A memorial to those who served in SOE was unveiled in 1996 on the wall of the west cloister of Westminster Abbey by the Queen Mother, and in 2009 on the Albert Embankment in London, depicting Violette Szabo. The Valençay SOE Memorial honours 91 male and 13 female SOE agents who lost their lives while working in France. The Tempsford Memorial was unveiled in 2013 by the then-Prince of Wales in Church End, Tempsford, Bedfordshire, close to the site of the former RAF Tempsford.

Most SOE records were "weeded out" and destroyed or burned in an accidental office fire after World War II.

== History ==
=== Origins ===
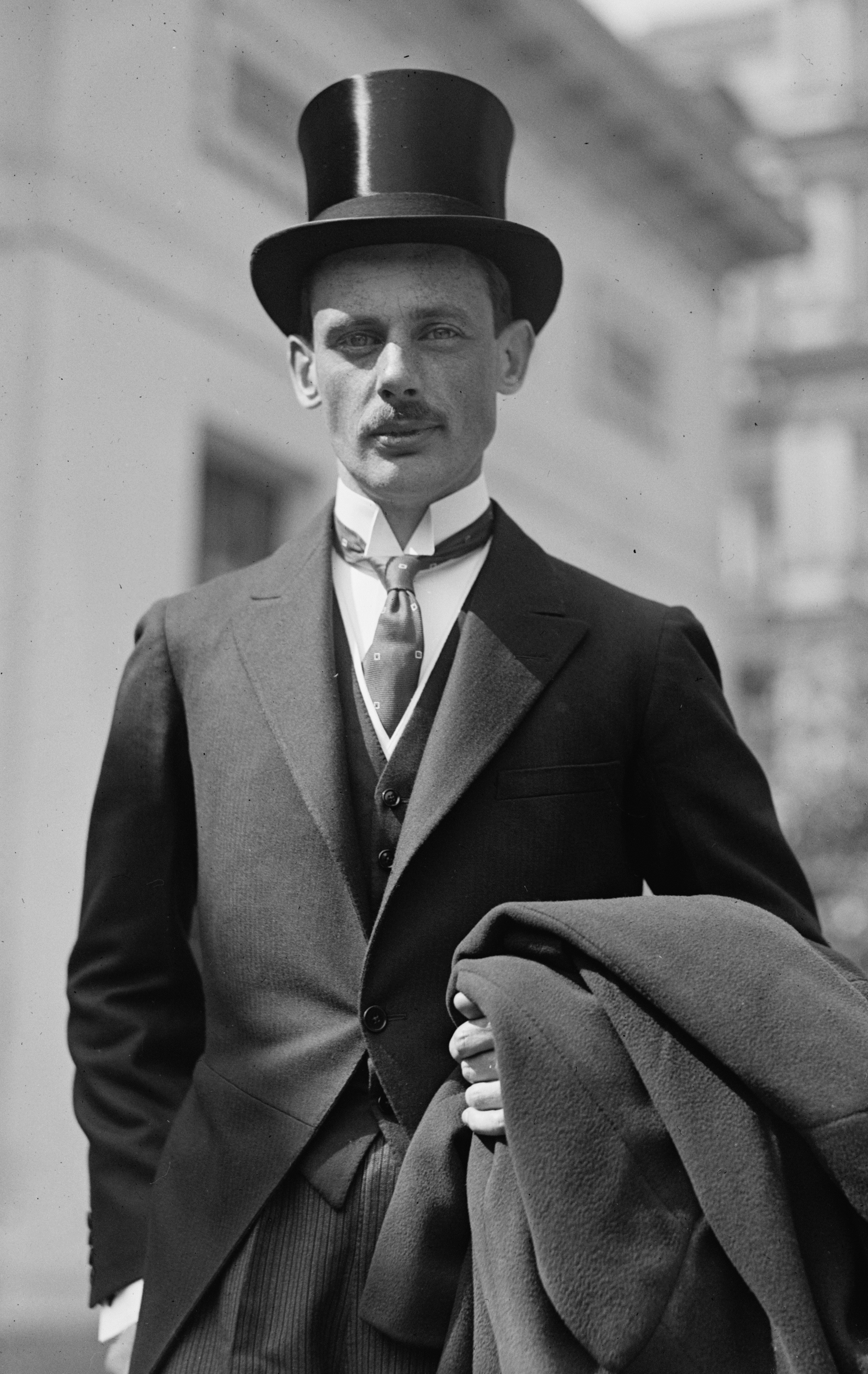
Sir Campbell Stuart was the director of Electra House.

SOE was formed from the amalgamation of three existing secret departments, which had been formed, or expanded from purely theoretical research bodies, shortly before the outbreak of the Second World War.

==== EH ====
Immediately after Germany annexed Austria (the Anschluss), in March 1938, the Foreign Office reestablished a propaganda organisation from the First World War known as the Department of Propaganda in Enemy Countries. In that earlier war, it had been known more commonly as "Crewe House," eponymously named after the building in which it operated (the present day location of the Embassy of Saudi Arabia in London), and was directed by the Viscount Northcliffe, directing as section leaders such figures as H. G. Wells and Hamilton Fyfe.

Neville Chamberlain approached the Canadian newspaper magnate Sir Campbell Stuart, formerly a member of Crewe House, to reestablish the department. However, because Stuart was the chairman of the Eastern Telegraph Company (today known as Cable & Wireless), he operated the department's headquarters out of his company's buildings at Electra House (two buildings in London connected by underground telegraphy cables). Therefore, the new propaganda unit was known as Electra House. While they were primarily focused on the production of white propaganda, Stuart also employed the staff of both Electra House buildings to monitor the telegraphy cables belonging to all foreign embassy missions in London, because the house on the Victoria Embankment sat directly on top of their cables. Where the earlier Crewe House had been primarily focused on leaflet campaigns and the production of printed materials, Electra House was involved in the full spectrum of media production: film, radio, newspapers, and gossip. Because Stuart firmly refused to have his department engaged in the production of black propaganda, other departments of the War Office, the Ministry of Information, and the Foreign Office were created to undertake these productions.

==== Section D ====
Later in March 1938, the Secret Intelligence Service (SIS, also known as MI6) formed a section known as Section D (the "D" apparently standing for "Destruction") under Major Laurence Grand, to investigate the use of sabotage, propaganda, and other irregular means to weaken an enemy.

Grand had been involved in guerrilla operations serving in the Far East and India. During an operation on the Indian North West Frontier, he had devised an unorthodox tactic after discovering that Pathan tribesmen were stealing British ammunition: he ordered every tenth round to be filled with high explosive instead of cordite. Though some officers regarded the idea of this as "ungentlemanly," Admiral Hugh Sinclair had considered it precisely the kind of ingenuity and ruthlessness Britain required against future enemies.

==== MI (R) ====
In the autumn of 1938, the War Office expanded an existing research department known as General Staff (Research) [GS (R)], and appointed Major J.C.F. Holland as its head to conduct research into guerrilla warfare. GS (R) was renamed Military Intelligence (Research) [MI(R)], in early 1939. Contrary to popular misconception, GS(R) had been created in 1936, not 1938.

Holland's interests in guerrilla warfare began after working on an operation with T.E. Lawrence during World War I, roughly a year and a half before being shot in the chest in a pub by the Irish Republican Army (IRA) during the Irish War of Independence. He wrote much about the IRA at this time, even going so far as to state that they had made guerrilla warfare a science in the modern age, and encouraged British Military Intelligence leadership to create an organization that had the effectiveness of this group. As a side project, he also created the British Commandos.

==== Pre-war and early Wartime activities ====
These three departments worked with few resources until the outbreak of war. There was much overlap between their activities. Sections D and EH duplicated much of each other's work. On the other hand, the heads of Section D and MI(R) knew each other and shared information. They agreed to a rough division of their activities; MI(R) researched irregular operations that could be undertaken by regular uniformed troops, while Section D dealt with truly undercover work.

During the early months of the war, Section D was based first at St Ermin's Hotel in Westminster and then the Metropole Hotel near Trafalgar Square. The Section attempted unsuccessfully to sabotage deliveries of vital strategic materials to Germany from neutral countries by mining the Iron Gate on the River Danube.

Separated by only nine months in age, Majors Jo Holland and Laurance Grand had been childhood friends at Rugby School, and later attended classes together at Royal Military Academy, Woolwich. Holland's secretary at the time, Joan Bright Astley, remarked later in her memoirs that the two worked together exceptionally well while developing the foundations of irregular warfare that would become SOE. Astley, herself a co-founder of SOE, would later be revealed to be one of the primary inspirations for the fictional character Miss Moneypenny in the James Bond series.

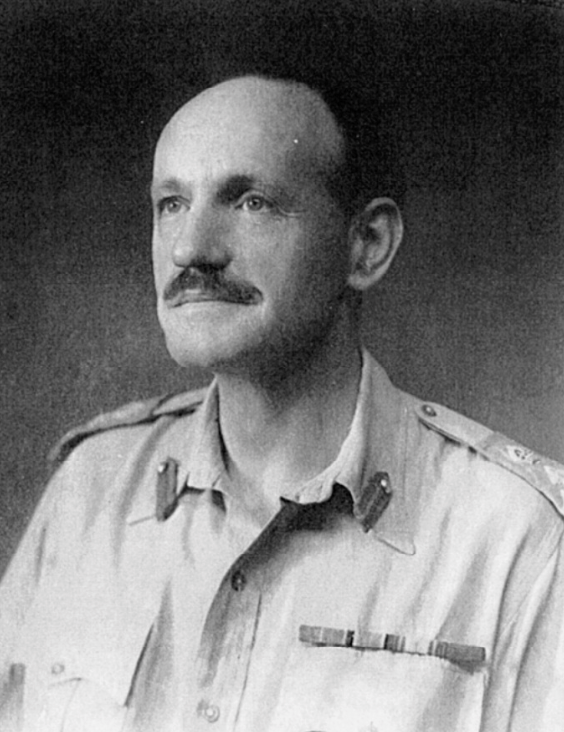
Laurence Grand, director of Section D.

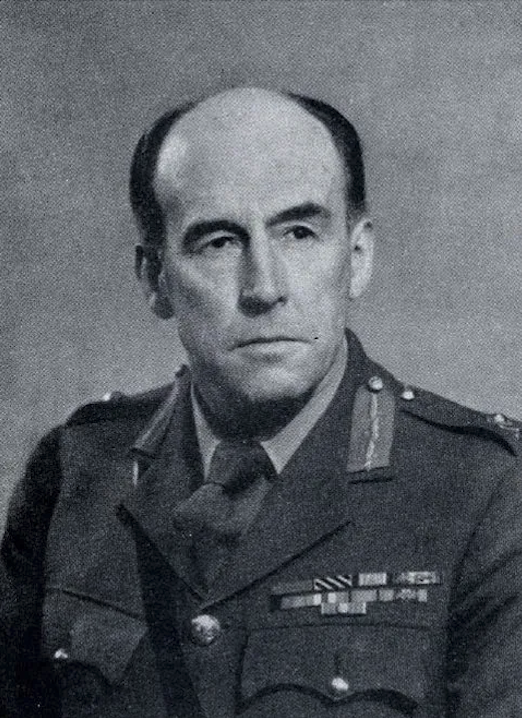
Jo Holland, director of MI(R).

These two men, friends since childhood, are largely considered the creators of the SOE and the modern form of guerrilla warfare. They formed a working relationship called "Scheme D," which was the prototype merger that eventually became SOE.

It is only in Colin Gubbins' official accounting of the story (he wrote the first official history of the SOE) that any animosity existed between the two men, which modern historians have noted to be a revisionist retelling, motivated by Gubbins' dislike of Laurance Grand. Gubbins did not share the same dislike of Holland and thought of him more as a father-figure, having been recruited and placed into command by Holland himself. Gubbins' dislike of Grand began while working at MI(R) around this time, because he did not appreciate that MI(R) was limited specifically to the domain of guerrilla warfare, while Section D was authorized to conduct guerrilla activities outside of a strictly defined warfighting capacity.

After the war, Gubbins was friends with the historians M. R. D. Foot and Nigel West, and used his influence over them to sabotage the legacy of Grand's primary contributions to the war effort, downplaying Section D as merely a "think tank," where in reality, Section D had operatives stationed all over Europe, and had formed relationships with many underground resistance movements. Those operatives were then absorbed into SOE.

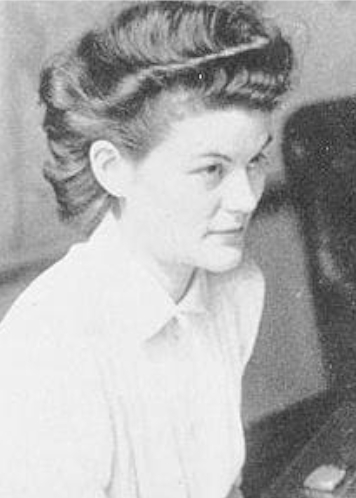
SOE might not have been possible without Joan Bright Astley, Secretarial Typist and Personal Assistant to Jo Holland. She also ran secret war rooms for Winston Churchill, and is considered one of the primary inspirations for Miss Moneypenny.

At the time that Section D was absorbed into the newly created SOE, it employed around 300 paid officers, though its real reach was far greater, in the contract agents that it had developed throughout Europe. Section D was more successful at establishing smuggling routes from Shetland through Norway that were the foundations of what would become the Shetland bus. It also established bureaus in Yugoslavia, Scandinavia, Romania, Greece, and several other locations. Laurence Grand and Section D were also responsible for establishing the D School training house at Brickendonbury, where the first batch of newly trained SOE officers were produced by Kim Philby and Guy Burgess.

However, despite all of Section D's work on the continent, the Germans kept advancing. Some contemporaries laid this failure of the British war machine squarely at the feet of British intelligence, and especially C, however, historians after the war such as Karl-Heinz Frieser and John Keegan note that the German advance might have been impossible to halt, no matter how many intelligence operatives and paramilitary operators were deployed. As a result of the advance, and his operators and foreign contacts being increasingly cut-off from allied supply lines – Laurence Grand established supply dumps set up by Section D, arranged in regular intervals between Paris and the German border. He also organized what was called the Home Defence Scheme, a form of Stay-behind network within the UK itself in the event the country was overrun and invaded.

The label of "think tank," would be much more appropriately designated to MI(R), where Holland desired his department to produce research documents and also invent devices and explosives that would be of great use to warfighters and operators on the ground. MI(R) produced, for example, pamphlets and technical handbooks for guerrilla leaders. Holland was also largely the progenitor of MI9, and the singular mind behind MIR(C), both of which produced major inventions during the war. Despite Holland's desire to remain functionally a research unit, one which Lord Hailsham described as "a clearing house for bright ideas," Colin Gubbins desired a much more active and kinetic function for the small subsection to which he commanded, the Guerrilla Field Services. Even though Gubbins appreciated Holland, at the time they disagreed about MI(R)'s role within the war effort. MI(R), therefore, was more frequently involved in kinetic activities, including the formation of the Independent Companies, autonomous units intended to carry out sabotage and guerrilla operations behind enemy lines in the Norwegian campaign. MI(R) also established the Auxiliary Units, stay-behind commando units based on the Home Guard, which would act in the event of an Axis invasion of Britain, as seemed possible in the early years of the war. (The Auxiliary Units themselves were based on the Home Defence Scheme, which was the creation of Section D).

Section D and MI(R) were very different units. MI(R) was staffed by uniformed officers who remained in uniform while on operation. Section D was staffed by undercover operatives who were not allowed to acknowledge each other in the street. Because he found the personnel to be overly paranoid, which he considered entertaining and funny, Holland often would walk up behind these Section D officers and shout "boo." However, despite their differences, an original plan in 1939 to merge the two units called "Scheme D" arose, and the two offices shared staff, offices, headquarters, and missions for some time. It was the idea of Scheme D that eventually transformed into the SOE.

=== Formation ===
On 13 June 1940, at the instigation of newly appointed Prime Minister Winston Churchill, Lord Hankey (who held the Cabinet post of Chancellor of the Duchy of Lancaster) persuaded Section D and MI(R) that their operations should be coordinated. On 1 July, a Cabinet-level meeting arranged the formation of a single sabotage organisation. On 16 July, Hugh Dalton, the Minister of Economic Warfare, was appointed to take political responsibility for the new organisation, which was formally created on 22 July 1940. Dalton recorded in his diary that on that day, the War Cabinet agreed to his new duties and that Churchill had told him, "And now go and set Europe ablaze." Dalton used the Irish Republican Army (IRA) during the Irish War of Independence as a model for the organisation.

Sir Frank Nelson was nominated by SIS to be director of the new organisation, and a senior civil servant, Gladwyn Jebb, transferred from the Foreign Office to it, with the title of Chief Executive Officer. Campbell Stuart left the organisation, and Major Grand was returned to the regular army. At his own request, Major Holland also left to take up a regular appointment in the Royal Engineers. (Both Grand and Holland eventually attained the rank of major-general.) However, Holland's former deputy at MI(R), Brigadier Colin Gubbins, returned from command of the Auxiliary Units to be Director of Operations of SOE.

One department of MI(R), MI R(C), which was involved in the development of weapons for irregular warfare, was not formally integrated into SOE but became an independent body codenamed MD1. Directed by Major (later Lieutenant Colonel) Millis Jefferis, it was located at The Firs in Whitchurch, Buckinghamshire and nicknamed "Churchill's Toyshop" from the Prime Minister's close interest in it and his enthusiastic support.

=== Leadership ===
The director of SOE was usually referred to by the initials "CD". Nelson, the first director to be appointed, was a former head of a trading firm in India, a back bench Conservative Member of Parliament and Consul in Basel, Switzerland, where he had also been engaged in undercover intelligence work.

In February 1942 Dalton was removed as the political head of SOE (possibly because he was using SOE's phone tapping facility to listen to conversations of fellow Labour ministers, or possibly because he was viewed as too "communistically inclined" and a threat to SIS). He became President of the Board of Trade and was replaced as Minister of Economic Warfare by Lord Selborne. Selborne, in turn, retired Nelson, who had suffered ill health as a result of his hard work, and appointed Sir Charles Hambro, head of Hambros Bank, to replace him. He also transferred Jebb back to the Foreign Office.

Hambro had been a close friend of Churchill before the war and had won the Military Cross in the First World War. He retained several other interests, for example, remaining chairman of Hambros and a director of the Great Western Railway. Some of his subordinates and associates expressed reservations that these interests distracted him from his duties as director. Selborne and Hambro nevertheless cooperated closely until August 1943, when they fell out over the question of whether SOE should remain a separate body or coordinate its operations with those of the British Army in several theatres of war. Hambro felt that any loss of autonomy would cause a number of problems for SOE in the future. At the same time, Hambro was found to have failed to pass on vital information to Selborne. He was dismissed as director and became head of a raw materials purchasing commission in Washington, D.C., which was involved in the exchange of nuclear information.

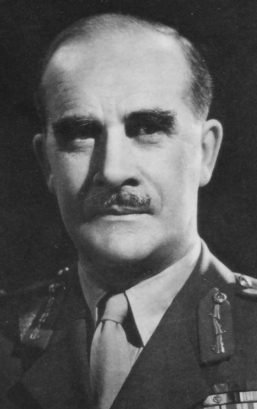
Major General Colin McVean Gubbins, director of SOE from September 1943

As part of the subsequent closer ties between the Imperial General Staff and SOE (although SOE had no representation on the Chiefs of Staff Committee), Hambro's replacement as director from September 1943 was Gubbins, who had been promoted to Major-general. Gubbins had wide experience of commando and clandestine operations and had played a major part in MI(R)'s and SOE's early operations. He also put into practice many of the lessons he learned from the IRA during the Irish War of Independence.

=== Organisation ===
==== Headquarters ====
The organisation of SOE continually evolved and changed during the war. Initially, it consisted of three broad departments:

- SO1 (formerly Department EH, which dealt with propaganda)
- SO2 (formerly Section D, special operations)
- SO3 (formerly MI(R), research)

SO3 was quickly overloaded with paperwork and was merged into SO2. In August 1941, following quarrels between the Ministry of Economic Warfare and the Ministry of Information over their relative responsibilities, SO1 was removed from SOE and became an independent organisation, the Political Warfare Executive.

Thereafter, a single, broad "Operations" department controlled the Sections operating into enemy and sometimes neutral territory, and the selection and training of agents. Sections, usually referred to by code letters or groups of letters, were assigned to a single country. Some enemy-occupied countries had two or more sections assigned to deal with politically disparate resistance movements. (France had no less than six). For security purposes, each section had its own headquarters and training establishments. This strict compartmentalisation was so effective that in mid-1942, five governments in exile jointly suggested that a single sabotage organisation be created, and were startled to learn that SOE had been in existence for two years.

Four departments and some smaller groups were controlled by the director of scientific research, Professor Dudley Maurice Newitt, and were concerned with the development or acquisition, and production of special equipment. A few other sections were involved with finance, security, economic research, and administration, although SOE had no central registry or filing system. When Gubbins was appointed director, he formalised some of the administrative practices which had grown in an ad hoc fashion and appointed an establishment officer to oversee the manpower and other requirements of the various departments.

The main controlling body of SOE was its council, consisting of around fifteen heads of departments or sections. About half of the council were from the armed forces (although some were specialists who were only commissioned after the outbreak of war), the rest were various civil servants, lawyers, or business or industrial experts. Most of the members of the council, and the senior officers and functionaries of SOE generally, were recruited by word of mouth among public school alumni and Oxbridge graduates, although this did not notably affect SOE's political complexion.

==== Subsidiary branches ====
Several subsidiary SOE stations were set up to manage operations that were too distant for London to control directly. SOE's operations in the Middle East and Balkans were controlled from a headquarters in Cairo, which became notorious for poor security, infighting and conflicts with other agencies. It was eventually named, in April 1944, "Special Operations (Mediterranean)," or SO(M). Shortly after the Allied landings in North Africa, a station code named "Massingham" was established near Algiers in late 1942, which operated into Southern France. Following the Allied invasion of Italy, personnel from Massingham established forward stations in Brindisi and near Naples. A subsidiary headquarters, initially known as "Force 133," was later set up in Bari in Southern Italy, under the Cairo headquarters, to control operations in the Balkans, including Greece, and Northern Italy.

An SOE station, first called the "India Mission," and subsequently known as "GS I(k)," was set up in India late in 1940. It subsequently moved to Ceylon so as to be closer to the headquarters of the Allied South East Asia Command and became known as "Force 136." A "Singapore Mission" was set up at the same time as the India Mission, but was unable to overcome official opposition to its attempts to form resistance movements in Malaya before the Japanese overran Singapore. Force 136 took over its surviving staff and operations. New York City also had a branch office, formally titled "British Security Coordination," and headed by Canadian businessman Sir William Stephenson. Their office, located at Room 3603, 630 Fifth Avenue, Rockefeller Center, coordinated the work of SOE, SIS, and MI5 with the American FBI and the Office of Strategic Services.

=== Aims ===
As with its leadership and organisation, the aims and objectives of SOE changed throughout the war, although they revolved around sabotaging and subverting the Axis war machines through indirect methods. SOE occasionally carried out operations with direct military objectives, such as Operation Harling, originally designed to cut one of the Axis supply lines to their troops fighting in North Africa. They also carried out some high-profile operations aimed mainly at the morale both of the Axis and occupied nations, such as Operation Anthropoid, the assassination in Prague of Reinhard Heydrich. In general, SOEs' objectives were to foment mutual hatred between the population of Axis-occupied countries and the occupiers, and to force the Axis to expend manpower and resources on maintaining their control of subjugated populations.

Dalton's initial statement about the outline of methods to be used by SOEs was "industrial and military sabotage, labor agitation and strikes, continuous propaganda, terrorist attacks against traitors and German leaders, boycotts and riots." Dalton's early enthusiasm for fomenting widespread strikes, civil disobedience, and sabotage in Axis-occupied areas had to be curbed. Thereafter, there were two main aims, often mutually incompatible: sabotage of the Axis war effort, and the creation of secret armies which would rise to assist the liberation of their countries when Allied troops arrived or were about to do so. It was recognised that acts of sabotage would bring about reprisals and increased Axis security measures, which would hamper the creation of underground armies. As the tide of war turned in the Allies' favour, these underground armies became more important.

=== Relationships ===
At the government level, SOEs' relationships with the Foreign Office were often difficult. On several occasions, various governments in exile protested at operations taking place without their knowledge or approval, provoking Axis reprisals against civilian populations, or complained about SOE's support for movements opposed to the exiled governments. SOE's activities also threatened relationships with neutral countries. SOE nevertheless generally adhered to the rule, "No bangs without Foreign Office approval."

Early attempts at bureaucratic control of Jefferis's MIR(c) by the Ministry of Supply were eventually foiled by Churchill's intervention. Thereafter, the Ministry co-operated, though at arm's length, with Dudley Newitt's various supply and development departments. The Treasury were accommodating from the start and were often prepared to turn a blind eye to some of SOE's questionable activities.

With other military headquarters and commands, SOE cooperated fairly well with Combined Operations Headquarters during the middle years of the war, usually on technical matters as SOE's equipment was readily adopted by commandos and other raiders. This support was lost when Vice Admiral Louis Mountbatten left Combined Operations, though by this time SOE had its own transport and did not need to rely on Combined Operations for resources. On the other hand, the Admiralty objected to SOE developing its own underwater vessels and the duplication of effort this involved. The Royal Air Force, and in particular RAF Bomber Command under "Bomber" Harris, were usually reluctant to allocate aircraft to SOE.

Towards the end of the war, as Allied forces began to liberate territories occupied by the Axis and in which SOE had established resistance forces, SOE also liaised with and to some extent came under the control of the Allied theatre commands. Relationships with Supreme Headquarters Allied Expeditionary Force in north-west Europe (whose commander was General Dwight D. Eisenhower) and South East Asia Command (whose commander was Admiral Louis Mountbatten, already well known to SOE) were generally excellent. However, there were difficulties with the Commanders in Chief in the Mediterranean, partly because of the complaints over impropriety at SOE's Cairo headquarters during 1941 and partly because both the supreme command in the Mediterranean and SOE's establishments were split in 1942 and 1943, leading to divisions of responsibility and authority.

There was tension between SOE and SIS, which the Foreign Office controlled. Stewart Menzies, the chief of SIS, was aggrieved to lose control of Section D. Where SIS preferred placid conditions in which it could gather intelligence and work through influential persons or authorities, SOE was intended to create unrest and turbulence, and often backed anti-establishment organisations, such as the Communists, in several countries. At one stage, SIS actively hindered SOE's attempts to infiltrate agents into enemy-occupied France.

Even before the United States joined the war, the head of the newly formed Office of the Coordinator of Information (COI), William J. Donovan, had received technical information from SOE and had arranged for some members of his organisation to undergo training at a camp run by SOE in Oshawa in Canada. In early 1942, Donovan's organisation became the Office of Strategic Services. SOE and OSS worked out respective areas of operation: OSS's exclusive sphere included China (including Manchuria), Korea, and Australia, the Atlantic islands, and Finland. SOE retained India, the Middle East and East Africa, and the Balkans. While the two services both worked in Western Europe, it was expected that SOE would be the leading partner.

In the middle of the war, the relations between SOE and OSS were not always smooth. They established a joint headquarters in Algiers, but the officers of the two organisations working there refused to share information. In the Balkans, and Yugoslavia especially, SOE and OSS several times worked at cross-purposes, reflecting their governments' differing (and changing) attitudes to the Partisans and Chetniks. However, in 1944, SOE and OSS successfully pooled their personnel and resources to mount Operation Jedburgh, providing large-scale support to the French Resistance following the Normandy landings. SOE had some nominal contact with the Soviet NKVD, but this was limited to a single liaison officer at each other's headquarters.

== Locations ==
=== Baker Street ===
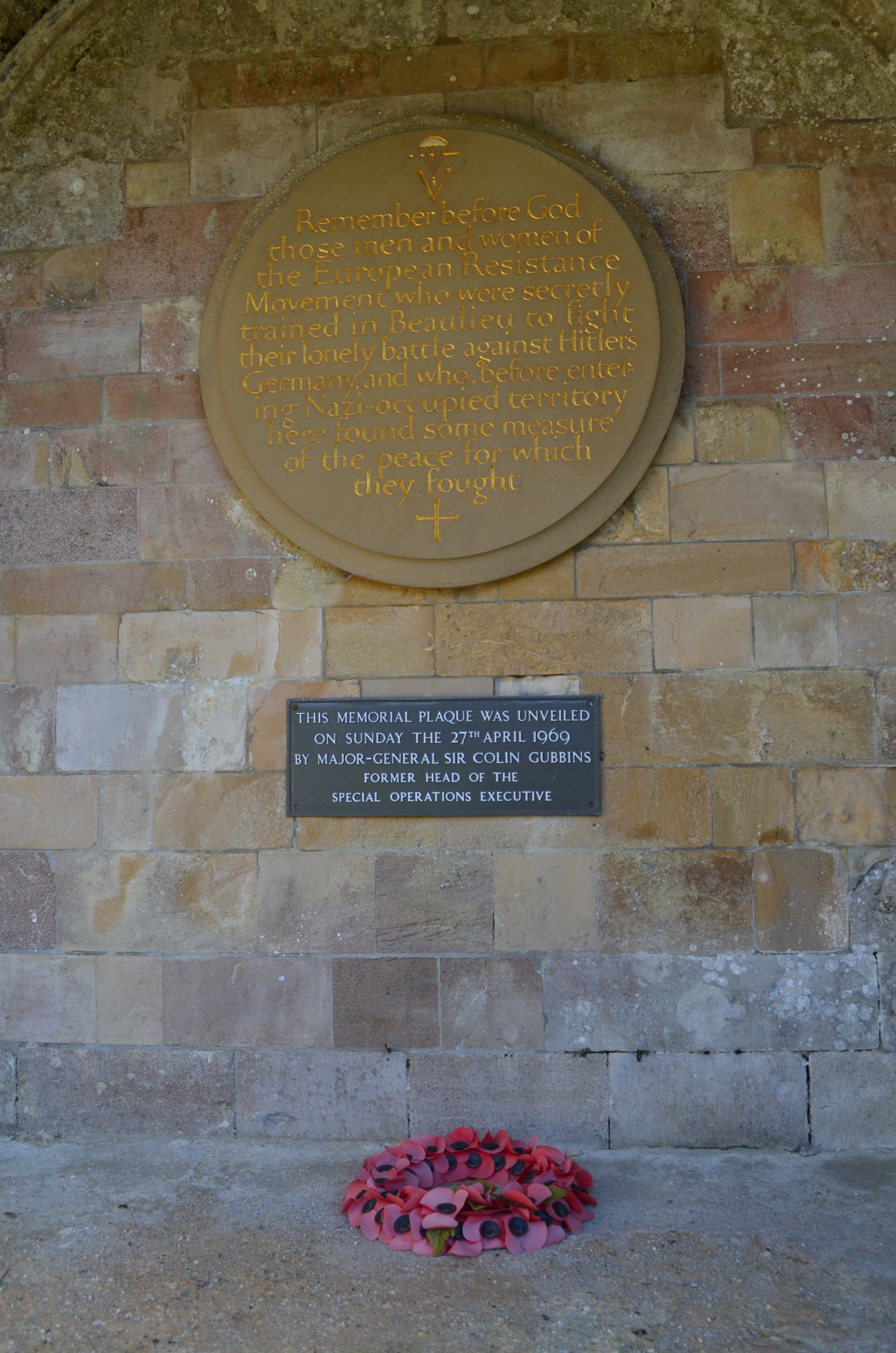
SOE memorial plaque in the cloister of Beaulieu Abbey, Hampshire, unveiled by Major General Gubbins in April 1969

After working from temporary offices in Central London, the headquarters of SOE were moved on 31 October 1940 into 64 Baker Street (hence the nickname "the Baker Street Irregulars"). Ultimately, SOE occupied much of the western side of Baker Street. "Baker Street" became the euphemistic synecdoche of referring to SOE. The precise nature of the buildings remained concealed; it had no entry in the telephone directories, and correspondence to external bodies bore service addresses: MO1 (SP) (a War Office branch), NID(Q) (Admiralty), AI10 (Air Ministry), or other fictitious bodies or civilian companies. SOE maintained a large number of training, research and development, or administrative centres. It was a joke that "SOE" stood for "Stately 'omes of England", after the large number of country houses and estates it requisitioned and used.

=== Production and trials ===
The establishments connected with experimentation and production of equipment were mainly concentrated in and around Hertfordshire and were designated by roman numbers. The main weapons and devices research establishments were The Firs, the home of MD1, formerly MIR(C), near Aylesbury in Buckinghamshire (although this was not formally part of SOE), and Station IX at The Frythe, a country house (and former private hotel) outside Welwyn Garden City where, under the cover name of ISRB (Inter Services Research Bureau), SOE developed radios, weapons, explosive devices and booby traps.

Section D originally had a research station at Bletchley Park, which also held the Government Code and Cipher School, until in November 1940 it was decided that it was unwise to conduct codebreaking and explosives experiments on the same site. The establishment moved to Aston House near Stevenage in Hertfordshire and was renamed Station XII. It originally conducted research and development, but from 1941 it became a production, storage, and distribution centre for devices already developed.

Station XV, at the Thatched Barn near Borehamwood, was devoted to camouflage, which usually meant equipping agents with authentic local clothing and personal effects. Various sub-stations in London were also involved in this task. Station XV and other camouflage sections also devised methods of hiding weapons, explosives, or radios in innocuous-seeming items.

Agents also needed identity papers, ration cards, currency, and so on. Station XIV, at Briggens House near Roydon in Essex, was originally the home of STS38, a training facility for Polish saboteurs, who set up their own forgery section. As the work expanded, it became the central forgery department for SOE, and the Poles eventually moved out on 1 April 1942. The technicians at Station XIV included several ex-convicts.

=== Training and operations ===
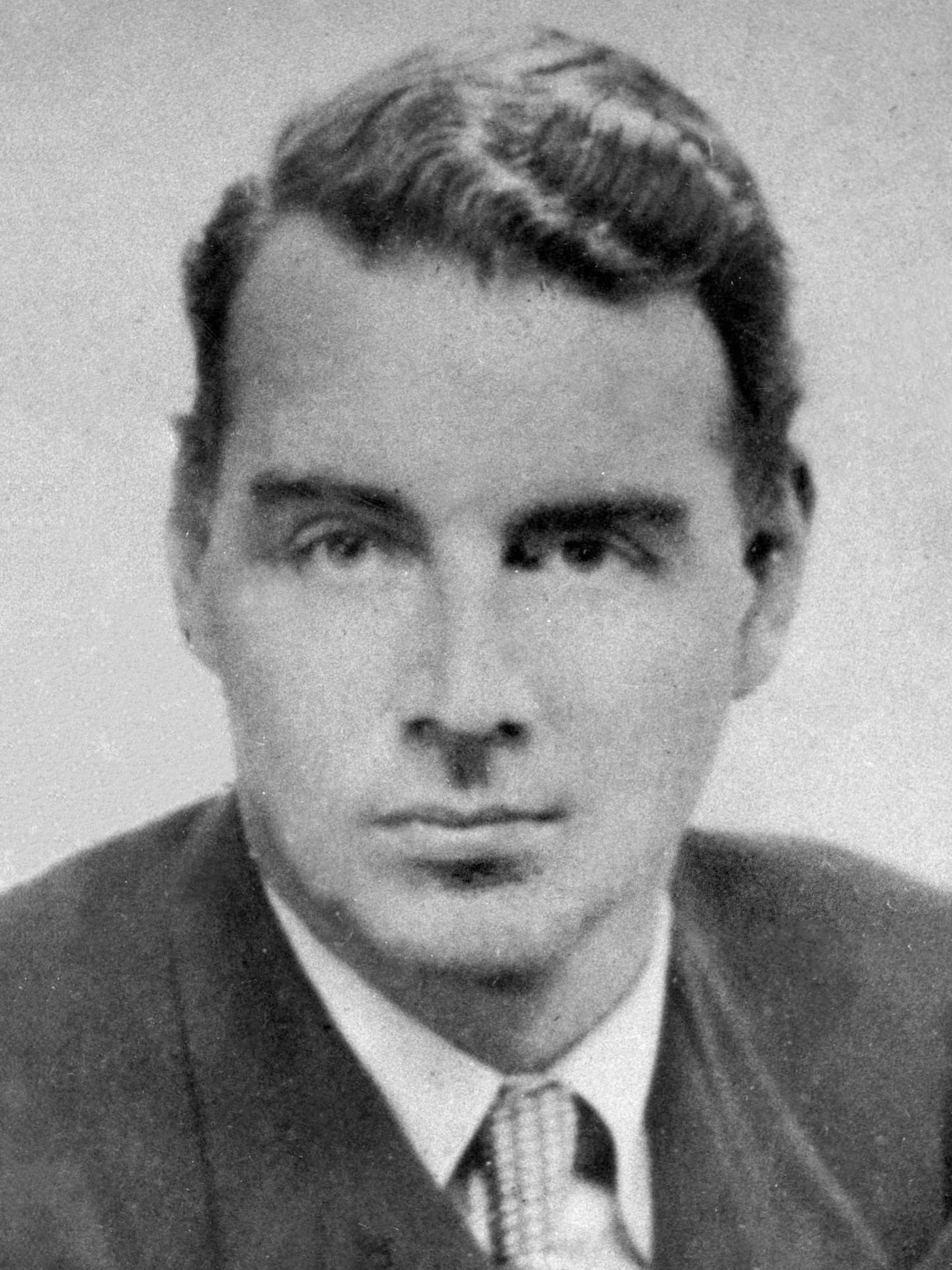
Guy Burgess created the School for Destruction at Brickendonbury and served as its first schoolmaster, and second-in-command of the installation.

The first British training school for guerrilla warfare, originally called the School for Destruction and established by Section D, was later absorbed by SOE. It was officially called Station XVII, or Station 17, and headquartered out of the manor house at Brickendonbury, and occupied the estate's extensive grounds, which were over 1,000 acres at the time. Station 17 was the brainchild of Guy Burgess, an operative for Section D serving under Laurence Grand, who desired to see students produced from an official military doctrine of irregular warfare. When the War Office purchased Brickendonbury in 1939, they placed Burgess as second-in-command of the training facility under Frederi Peters. Burgess hired Kim Philby to create the curriculum for the school.

Burgess initially desired that the school should be called the "Guy Fawkes School," but that name did not stick. After the merger into SOE, D School came to be known as STS 17, where Burgess and Philby produced the first batch of SOE officers trained entirely in-house. Burgess was later arrested for drunk driving and removed from command. Thus, the two men who produced the first batch of SOE officers and wrote its training curriculum – Philby and Burgess – were double agents working for the Soviet Union. However, at this early stage in the war, the Cold War had not yet begun, and the USSR also had a desire to see the destruction of Nazi Germany.

The training establishments and properties later used by country sections were designated by Arabic numbers and were widely distributed. The initial training centres of SOE were at country houses such as Wanborough Manor, Guildford. Agents destined to serve in the field underwent commando training at Arisaig in Scotland, where they were taught armed and unarmed combat skills by William E. Fairbairn and Eric A. Sykes, former Inspectors in the Shanghai Municipal Police. Those who passed this course received parachute training by STS 51 and 51a situated near Altrincham, Cheshire with the assistance of No.1 Parachute Training School RAF, at RAF Ringway (which later became Manchester Airport). They then attended courses in security and Tradecraft at Group B schools around Beaulieu in Hampshire. Finally, depending on their intended role, they received specialist training in skills such as demolition techniques or Morse code telegraphy at various country houses in England.

SOE's Cairo branch established a commando and parachute training school numbered STS 102 at Ramat David near Haifa. This school trained agents who joined SOE from among the armed forces stationed in the Middle East, and also members of the Special Air Service and Greek Sacred Squadron. A commando training centre similar to Arisaig and run by Fairbairn was later set up at Oshawa, for Canadian members of SOE and members of the newly created American organisation, the Office of Strategic Services.

== Agents ==
A variety of people from all classes and pre-war occupations served SOE in the field. The backgrounds of agents in F Section, for example, ranged from aristocrats such as Polish-born Countess Krystyna Skarbek, and Noor Inayat Khan, the daughter of an Indian Sufi leader, to working-class people such as Violette Szabo and Michael Trotobas, with some even reputedly from the criminal underworld. Some of them were recruited by word of mouth among the acquaintances of SOE's officers; others responded to routine trawls of the armed forces for people with unusual languages or other specialised skills.

In most cases, the primary quality required of an agent was a deep knowledge of the country in which he or she was to operate, and especially its language, if the agent was to pass as a native of the country. Dual nationality was often a prized attribute. This was particularly so of France. In other cases, especially in the Balkans, a lesser degree of fluency was required as the resistance groups concerned were already in open rebellion, and a clandestine existence was unnecessary. A flair for diplomacy combined with a taste for rough soldiering was more necessary. Some regular army officers proved adept as envoys, and others (such as the former diplomat Fitzroy Maclean or the classicist Christopher Woodhouse) were commissioned only during wartime. Several of SOE's agents were from the Jewish Parachutists of Mandate Palestine, some of whom were émigrés from countries in Europe. Thirty-two of them served as agents in the field, seven of whom were captured and executed.

Exiled or escaped members of the armed forces of some occupied countries were obvious sources of agents. This was particularly true of Norway and the Netherlands. In other cases (such as Frenchmen owing loyalty to Charles de Gaulle and especially the Poles), the agents' first loyalty was to their leaders or governments in exile, and they treated SOE only as a means to an end. This could occasionally lead to mistrust and strained relations in Britain. The organisation was prepared to ignore almost any contemporary social convention in its fight against the Axis. It employed known homosexuals, people with criminal records (some of whom taught skills such as picking locks), those with bad conduct records in the armed forces, Communists, and anti-British nationalists. Some of them might have been considered a security risk, but no known case exists of an SOE agent wholeheartedly going over to the enemy. The Frenchman, Henri Déricourt, is widely regarded as a traitor, but he was exonerated by a war crimes court, and some have claimed he was acting under secret orders from SOE or MI6.

SOE was also far ahead of contemporary attitudes in its use of women in armed combat. Although women were first considered only as couriers in the field, or as wireless operators or administrative staff in Britain, those sent into the field were trained in the use of weapons and in unarmed combat. Most were commissioned into either the First Aid Nursing Yeomanry (FANY) or the Women's Auxiliary Air Force. Women often assumed leadership roles in the field. Pearl Witherington became the organiser (leader) of a highly successful resistance network in France. Early in the war, American Virginia Hall functioned as the unofficial nerve center of several SOE networks in Vichy France. Many women agents such as Odette Hallowes or Violette Szabo were decorated for bravery, posthumously in Szabo's case. Of SOE's 41 (or 39 in some estimates) female agents serving in Section F (France), sixteen did not survive, with twelve killed or executed in Nazi concentration camps.

== Communications ==
=== Radio ===
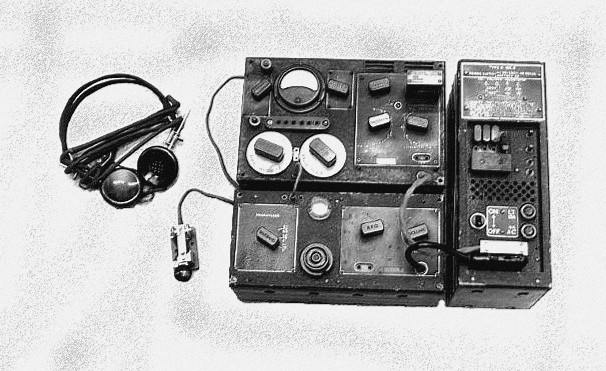
B MK II receiver and transmitter (also known as the B2 radio set)

Most of the resistance networks that SOE formed or liaised with were controlled by radio directly from Britain or one of SOE's subsidiary headquarters. All resistance circuits contained at least one wireless operator, and all drops or landings were arranged by radio, except for some early exploratory missions sent "blind" into enemy-occupied territory. SOE wireless operators were also known as "The Pianists". At first, SOE's radio traffic went through the SIS-controlled radio station at Bletchley Park. From 1 June 1942, SOE used its own transmitting and receiving stations at Grendon Underwood in Buckinghamshire and Poundon nearby, as the location and topography were suitable. Teleprinters linked the radio stations with SOE's HQ in Baker Street. Operators in the Balkans worked to radio stations in Cairo.

SOE was highly dependent upon the security of radio transmissions, involving three factors: the physical qualities and capabilities of the radio sets, the security of the transmission procedures, and the provision of proper ciphers.

SOE's first radios were supplied by SIS. They were large and clumsy and required large amounts of power. SOE acquired a few, much more suitable, sets from the Poles in exile, but eventually designed and manufactured their own, such as the Paraset morse code transceiver, under the direction of Lieutenant Colonel F. W. Nicholls of the Royal Corps of Signals, who had served with Gubbins between the wars. The A Mk III, with its batteries and accessories, weighed only 9 pounds (4.1 kg), and could fit into a small attache case, although the B Mk II, otherwise known as the B2, which weighed 32 pounds (15 kg), was required to work over ranges greater than about 500 miles (800 km).

Operating procedures were insecure at first. Operators were forced to transmit verbose messages on fixed frequencies and at fixed times and intervals. This allowed German direction finding teams time to triangulate their positions. After several operators were captured or killed, procedures were made more flexible and secure.

As with their first radio sets, SOE's first ciphers were inherited from SIS. Leo Marks, SOE's chief cryptographer, was responsible for the development of better codes to replace the insecure poem codes. Eventually, SOE settled on single-use ciphers, printed on silk. Unlike paper, which would be given away by rustling, silk would not be detected by a casual search if it was concealed in the lining of clothing.

=== BBC ===
The BBC also played its part in communications with agents or groups in the field. During the war, it broadcast to almost all Axis-occupied countries and was avidly listened to, even at risk of arrest. The BBC included various "personal messages" in its broadcasts, which could include lines of poetry, literature or apparently nonsensical items. They could be used to announce the safe arrival of an agent or message in London for example, or could be instructions to carry out operations on a given date. They were used, for example, to mobilise the resistance groups in the hours before Operation Overlord.

=== Other methods ===
In the field, agents could sometimes make use of the postal services, though these were slow, not always reliable, and letters were almost certain to be opened and read by the Axis security services. In training, agents were taught to use a variety of easily available substances to make invisible ink, though most of these could be detected by a cursory examination, or to hide coded messages in apparently innocent letters. The telephone services were even more certain to be intercepted and listened to by the enemy, and could be used only with great care. The most secure method of communication in the field was by courier. In the earlier part of the war, most women sent as agents in the field were employed as couriers, on the assumption that they would be less likely to be suspected of illicit activities.

== Equipment ==
=== Weapons ===
Although SOE used some suppressed weapons such as the De Lisle carbine and the Welrod (specifically developed for SOE at Station IX), it took the view that weapons issued to resisters should not require extensive training in their use, or need careful maintenance. The crude and cheap Sten was a favourite. For issues to large forces such as the Yugoslav Partisans, SOE used captured German or Italian weapons. These were available in large quantities after the Tunisian and Sicilian campaigns and the surrender of Italy, and the partisans could acquire ammunition for these weapons (and the Sten) from enemy sources. SOE also adhered to the principle that resistance fighters would be handicapped rather than helped by heavy equipment such as mortars or anti-tank guns. These were awkward to transport, almost impossible to conceal, and required skilled and highly trained operators. Later in the war however, when resistance groups staged open rebellions against enemy occupation, some heavy weapons were dispatched, for example to the Maquis du Vercors. Weapons such as the British Army's standard Bren light machine gun were also supplied in such cases.

Most SOE agents received training on captured enemy weapons before being sent into enemy-occupied territory. Ordinary SOE agents were also armed with handguns acquired abroad, such as, from 1941, a variety of US pistols, and a large quantity of the Spanish Llama .38 ACP in 1944. Such was SOE's demand for weapons, a consignment of 8,000 Ballester–Molina .45 calibre weapons was purchased from Argentina, apparently with the mediation of the US. Lacking British proof markings, these guns could be supplied deniably to resistance groups.

SOE agents were issued with the Fairbairn–Sykes fighting knife, also issued to Commandos. For specialised operations or use in extreme circumstances, SOE issued small fighting knives which could be concealed in the heel of a hard leather shoe or behind a coat lapel. Concealed "Coin slasher" knives were used for slashing car tyres. Given the likely fate of agents captured by the Gestapo, SOE also disguised suicide pills as coat buttons.

=== Sabotage ===
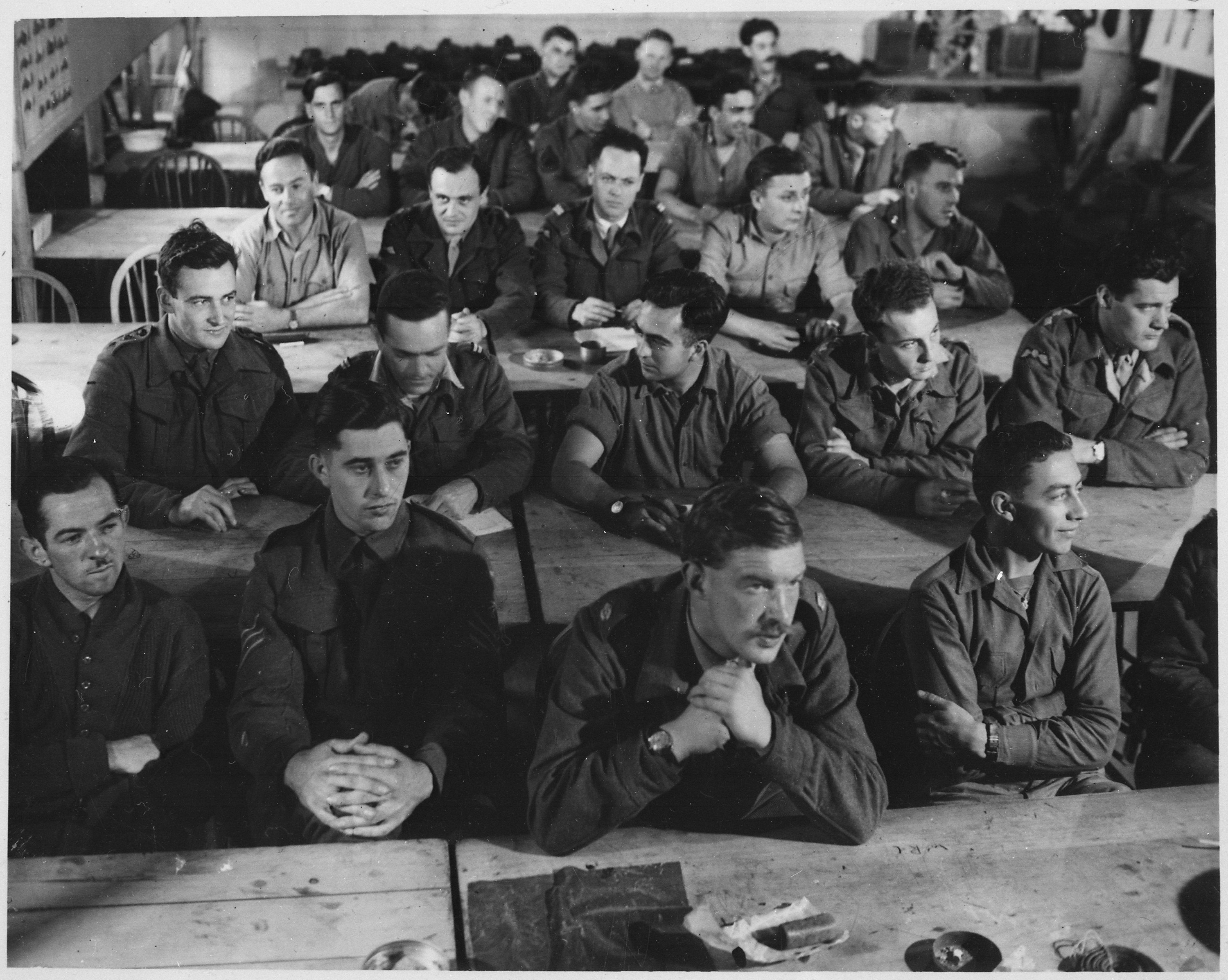
Audience in demolition class, Milton Hall, c. 1944

SOE developed a wide range of explosive devices for sabotage, such as limpet mines, shaped charges, and time fuses, which were also widely used by commando units. Most of these devices were designed and produced at The Firs. The Time Pencil, invented by Commander A.J.G. Langley, the first commandant of Station XII at Aston was used to give a saboteur time to escape after setting a charge and was far simpler to carry and use than lighted fuses or electrical detonators. It relied on crushing an internal vial of acid, which then corroded a retaining wire, which sometimes made it inaccurate in cold or hot conditions. Later, the L-Delay, which instead allowed a lead retaining wire to "creep" until it broke and was less affected by the temperature, was introduced.

SOE pioneered the use of plastic explosive. (The term "plastique" comes from plastic explosive packaged by SOE and originally destined for France but taken to the United States instead.) Plastic explosive could be shaped and cut to perform almost any demolition task. It was also inert and required a powerful detonator to cause it to explode, and was therefore safe to transport and store. It was used in everything from car bombs to exploding rats designed to destroy coal-fired boilers. Other, more subtle sabotage methods included lubricants laced with grinding materials, intended for introduction into vehicle oil systems, railway wagon axle boxes, etc., incendiaries disguised as innocuous objects, explosive material concealed in coal piles to destroy locomotives, and land mines disguised as cow or elephant dung. On the other hand, some sabotage methods were extremely simple but effective, such as using sledgehammers to crack cast-iron mountings for machinery.

=== Other ===
SOE also revived some medieval devices, such as the caltrop, which could be used to burst the tyres of vehicles or injure foot soldiers and crossbows powered by multiple rubber bands to shoot incendiary bolts. There were two types, known as "Big Joe" and "Li'l Joe" respectively. They had tubular alloy skeleton stocks and were designed to be collapsible for ease of concealment. SOE agents were issued a "striptease suit", a camouflage overall, and a matching cloth helmet for parachute insertion behind enemy lines. This item was not intended to be used in the sense of a uniform and only for concealment and to be discarded after landing in the dropzone. Another rare item in the same camouflage was the "Smock Covert SOE", an overhead smock similar to the SAS windproof but lined with wool, used a large front split pocket and came with a crotch flap. These items and the SOE brushstroke camouflage pattern were Paramilitary as they were never issued to the main armed forces but only the Special Operations Executive.

An important section of SOE was Operational Research, which worked mostly from Station IX but also called on the facilities of Station XII and HQ. It operated through the User Trials Section and later the Air Supply Research Section and was formally established in August 1943. The section had the responsibility for both issuing formal requirements and specifications to the relevant development and production sections and for testing prototypes of the devices under field conditions. It ensured that operational requirements were properly assessed, trials conducted, and quality monitored. Over the period from 1 November 1943 to 1 November 1944, the section tested 78 devices. Some of these were weapons such as the Sleeve gun or fuses or adhesion devices to be used in sabotage, others were utility objects such as waterproof containers for stores to be dropped by parachute, or night glasses (lightweight binoculars with plastic lenses). Of the devices tested, 47% were accepted for use with little or no modification, 31% were accepted only after considerable modification, and the remaining 22% were rejected. Before SOE's research and development procedures were formalised in 1943, a variety of more or less useful devices were developed. Some of the more imaginative devices invented by SOE included exploding pens with enough explosive power to blast a hole in the bearer's body, or guns concealed in tobacco pipes, though there is no record of any of these being used in action. Station IX developed a miniature folding motorbike (the Welbike) for use by parachutists, though this was noisy and conspicuous, used scarce petrol, and was of little use on rough ground.

== Transportation ==
The continent of Europe was largely closed to normal travel. Although it was possible in some cases to cross frontiers from neutral countries such as Spain or Sweden, it was slow, and there were problems over violating these countries' neutrality. SOE had to rely largely on its own air or sea transport for the movement of people, arms, and equipment.

=== Air ===
SOE had mostly to rely on the RAF for its planes. It was engaged in disputes with the RAF from its early days. In January 1941, an intended ambush (Operation Savanna) against the aircrew of a German "pathfinder" air group near Vannes in Brittany was thwarted when Air Vice Marshal Charles Portal, the Chief of the Air Staff, objected on moral grounds to parachuting what he regarded as assassins, although Portal's objections were later overcome and Savanna was mounted, unsuccessfully. From 1942, when Air Marshal Arthur Harris ("Bomber Harris") became the Commander-in-Chief of RAF Bomber Command, he consistently resisted the diversion of the most capable types of bombers to SOE purposes.

SOE's first aircraft were two Armstrong Whitworth Whitleys belonging to 419 Flight RAF, which was formed in September 1940. In 1941, the flight was expanded to become No. 138 Squadron RAF. In February 1942, they were joined by No. 161 Squadron RAF. 161 Squadron flew agent insertions and pick-ups, while 138 Squadron delivered arms and stores by parachute. "C" flight from No. 138 Squadron later became No. 1368 Flight of the Polish Air Force, which joined No. 624 Squadron flying Halifaxes in the Mediterranean. By the later stages of the war several United States Army Air Forces squadrons were operating Douglas C-47 Skytrains in the Mediterranean, although by this time their operations had passed from SOE proper to the "Balkan Air Terminal Service". Three Special Duties squadrons operated in the Far East using a variety of aircraft, including the very long-range Consolidated B-24 Liberator.

==== RAF Tempsford ====
Nos. 161 and 138 Squadrons were based at RAF Tempsford in Bedfordshire, though No. 161 Squadron often moved forward to RAF Tangmere, close to the coast in West Sussex, to shorten their flights. The airfield at Tempsford became the RAF's most secret base. (Tempsford had been rejected for Bomber Command's purposes by Harris in March 1942, as it frequently became waterlogged.) RAF Tempsford was designed to look like an ordinary working farm. SOE used Tangmere Cottage, opposite the main entrance to the base. SOE agents were lodged in a local hotel before being ferried to farm buildings, the "Gibraltar Farm" within the airfield's perimeter track. After final briefings and checks at the farm, the agents were issued firearms in the barn and then boarded a waiting aircraft.

The squadrons' first task was to take agents to France who could select suitable fields for their aircraft. Most of these agents were French expatriates, some of whom had been pilots in the French Armée de l'Air. Once the agent was in place and had selected several potential fields, 161 Squadron delivered SOE agents, wireless equipment, and operators, and weapons, and flew French political leaders, resistance leaders, or their family members, and downed allied airmen to Britain. Between them, the two squadrons transported 101 agents to, and recovered 128 agents, diplomats and airmen from occupied France.

==== 161 Squadron operations ====
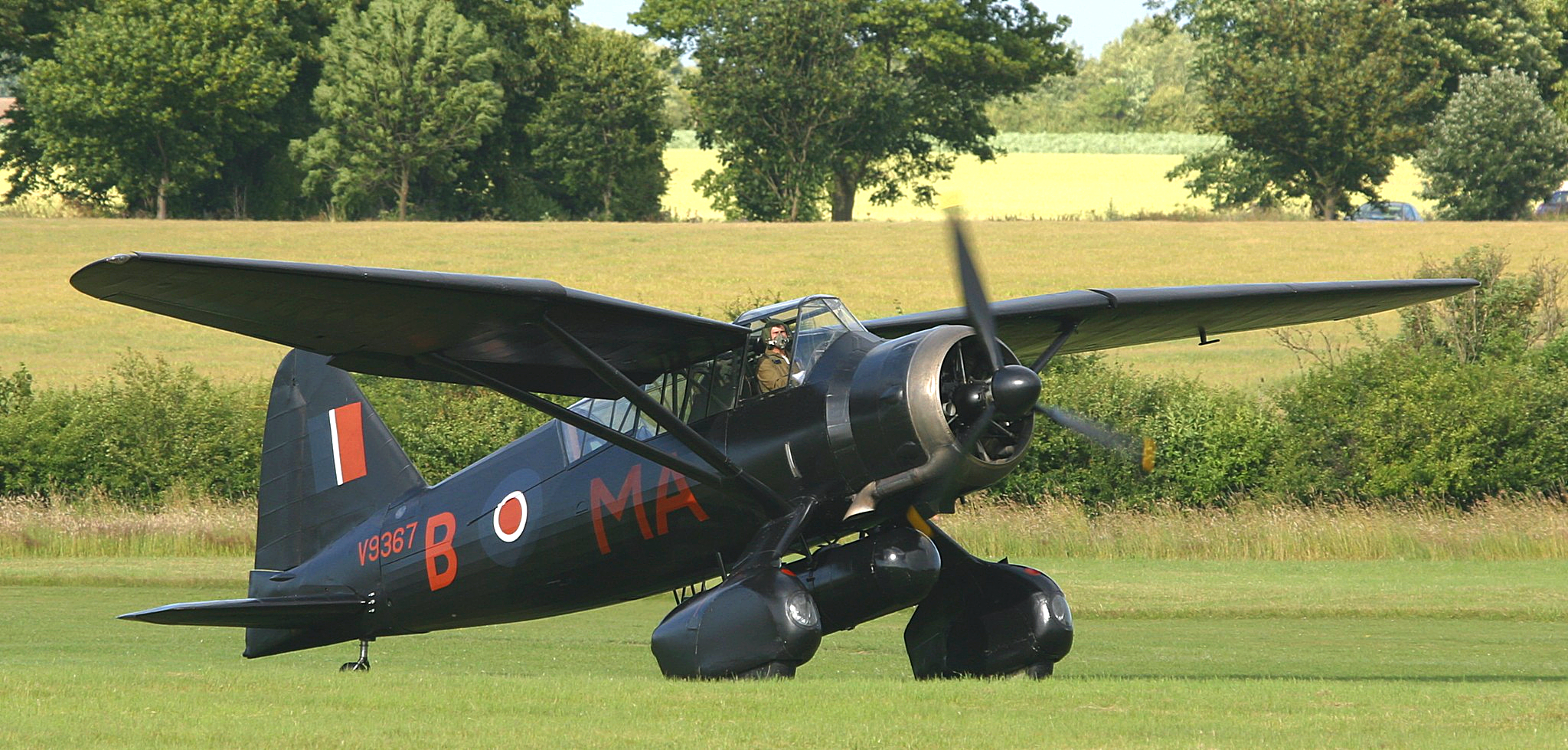
Westland Lysander Mk III (SD), the type used for special missions into occupied France during World War II

The principal aircraft of 161 Squadron was the Westland Lysander. It handled very well at low speed and could land from touch down to turn around in only 150 yards (140 m). It had a range of 700 miles (1,100 km) and could carry one to three passengers in the rear cockpit and stores in a pannier underneath the fuselage. It was flown by a single pilot, who also had to navigate, so missions had to be flown on clear nights with a full or near full moon. Bad weather often thwarted missions, German night fighters were also a hazard, and pilots could never know when landing whether they would be greeted by the resistance or the Gestapo.

The procedure once a Lysander reached its destination in France was described by Squadron Leader Hugh Verity. Once the aircraft reached the airfield, the agent on the ground would signal the aircraft by flashing a prearranged code letter in Morse. The aircraft would respond by blinking back the appropriate code response letter. The agent and his men would then mark the field by lighting the three landing lights, which were flashlights attached to poles. The "A" lamp was at the base of the landing ground. 150 metres beyond it and into the wind was the "B" light, and 50 metres to the right of "B" was the "C" light. The three lights formed an inverted "L", with the "B" and "C" lights upwind from "A". With the code passed, the pilot would land the aircraft. He then would taxi back to the "A" lamp, where the passengers would clamber down the fixed ladder to the ground, often while the pilot was making a slow U-turn. Before leaving, the last passenger would hand off the luggage and then take on board the outgoing luggage before climbing down the ladder as well. Then the outgoing passengers would climb aboard and the aircraft would take off. The whole exchange might take as little as 3 minutes.

The Lockheed Hudson had a range of 1,960 miles (3,150 km), and could carry more passengers (ten or more), but required landing strips more than double the length of those needed for the Lysander - 350 yards (320 m) vs. 150 yards (140 m)). It carried a navigator, to ease the load on the pilot, and could also be fitted with navigational equipment, such as the "Rebecca" homing transceiver of the Rebecca/Eureka transponding radar system. The Hudson's use with 161 Squadron was developed by Charles Pickard and Hugh Verity. Pickard determined that the Hudson's stall speed was actually some 20 miles per hour (32 km/h) slower than its manual stated. Before it was first used on 13 January 1943, 161 Squadron had to send two Lysander aircraft, in what they termed "a double", if larger parties needed to be picked up.

==== 138 Squadron and other Special Duties units operations ====
No. 138 Squadron's primary mission was the delivery of equipment, and occasionally agents, by parachute. It flew a variety of bomber-type aircraft, often modified with extra fuel tanks and flame-suppressing exhaust shrouds: the Armstrong Whitworth Whitley until November 1942, the Handley Page Halifax and later the Short Stirling. The Stirling could carry a very large load (18 containers), but the aircraft with the longest range was the Halifax, which, when based in Italy, could reach drop zones as far away as eastern Poland.

Stores were usually parachuted in cylindrical containers. The "C" type was 69 inches (180 cm) long, and when fully loaded could weigh up to 224 pounds (102 kg). The "H" type was the same size overall but could be broken down into five smaller sections. This made it easier to carry and conceal, but it could not be loaded with longer loads such as rifles. Some inert stores such as boots and blankets were "free-dropped," i.e., simply thrown out of the aircraft bundled together without a parachute, often to the hazard of any receiving committee on the ground.

==== Locating and homing equipment ====
Some devices used by SOE were designed specifically to guide aircraft to landing strips and dropping zones. Such sites could be marked by an agent on the ground with bonfires or bicycle lamps, but this required good visibility, as the pilot or navigator of a plane had not only to spot the ground signals, but also to navigate by visible landmarks to correct dead reckoning. Many landings or drops were thwarted by bad weather. To overcome these problems, SOE and Allied airborne forces used the Rebecca/Eureka transponding radar, which enabled a Hudson or larger aircraft to home in on a point on the ground even in thick weather.

It was, however, difficult for agents or resistance fighters to carry or conceal the ground-based "Eureka" transponder equipment. SOE also developed the S-Phone, which allowed a pilot or radio operator aboard an aircraft to communicate by voice with the "reception committee". Sound quality was good enough for voices to be recognisable, so that a mission could be aborted in case of any doubts about an agent's identity.

=== Boats and Submarines ===
SOE also experienced difficulties with the Royal Navy, who were usually unwilling to allow SOE to use its motor torpedo boats or submarines to deliver agents or equipment. Submarines were regarded as too valuable to risk within range of enemy coastal defences. They could also carry only small numbers of agents, in great discomfort, and could disembark stores only in small dinghies or canoes, which made it difficult to land large quantities of equipment. SOE nevertheless used them in the Indian Ocean where the distances made it impracticable to use any smaller craft.

The vessels used by SOE during the early part of the war were clandestine craft such as fishing boats or caiques. They could pass muster as innocent local craft and carry large quantities of stores. They also had the advantage of being largely outside Admiralty control. However, SOE's first small craft organisation, which was set up in the Helford estuary in Cornwall, suffered from obstruction from SIS, which had a similar private navy nearby. Eventually, in spring 1943, the Admiralty created a Deputy Director of Operations (Irregular) to superintend all such private navies. This officer turned out to be the former commander of SIS's craft in the Helford estuary, but his successor in charge of SIS's Helford base cooperated much better with SOE's flotilla. While SIS, SOE and, MI9 landed, and embarked several dozen agents, refugees and Allied aircrew, it was impossible to transport large quantities of arms and equipment inland from beaches in heavily patrolled coastal areas, until France was almost liberated. SOE also had use of HMS Fidelity, a disguised armed merchant ship operated by an independent group of displaced Frenchmen, led by Lt. Commander Jack Langlais. Together with Belgian agent Albert Guérisse, founder of the Pat O'Leary escape route, Fidelity undertook several clandestine missions in the western Mediterranean in 1941.

Station IX developed several miniature submersible craft. The Welman submarine and Sleeping Beauty were offensive weapons, intended to place explosive charges on or adjacent to enemy vessels at anchor. The Welman was used once or twice in action, but without success. The Welfreighter was intended to deliver stores to beaches or inlets, but it too was unsuccessful. A sea trials unit was set up in West Wales at Goodwick, by Fishguard (station IXa), where these craft were tested. In late 1944, craft were dispatched to Australia to the Allied Intelligence Bureau (SRD), for tropical testing. After the German occupation of Norway, many Norwegian merchant seamen and fishermen made their way to Britain. SOE recruited several to maintain communications to Norway, using fishing boats from a base in the Shetland Islands. The service became so reliable that it became known as the Shetland Bus. One of its boats and crews launched a daring but unsuccessful attack ("Operation Title") against the German battleship Tirpitz. A similar organisation ran missions to occupied Denmark (and neutral Sweden) from the east coast of Britain. The "Shetland Bus" was unable to operate only during the very long hours of daylight in the Arctic summer, because of the risk that the slow fishing boats would be attacked by patrolling German aircraft. Late in the war, the unit acquired three fast Submarine chasers for such missions. About the same time, SOE also acquired Motor Gun Boats and MTBs for the Helford flotilla. SOE also used feluccas to maintain communications between Algiers, and southern France and Corsica, and some caïques in the Aegean.

== Operations ==
=== France ===
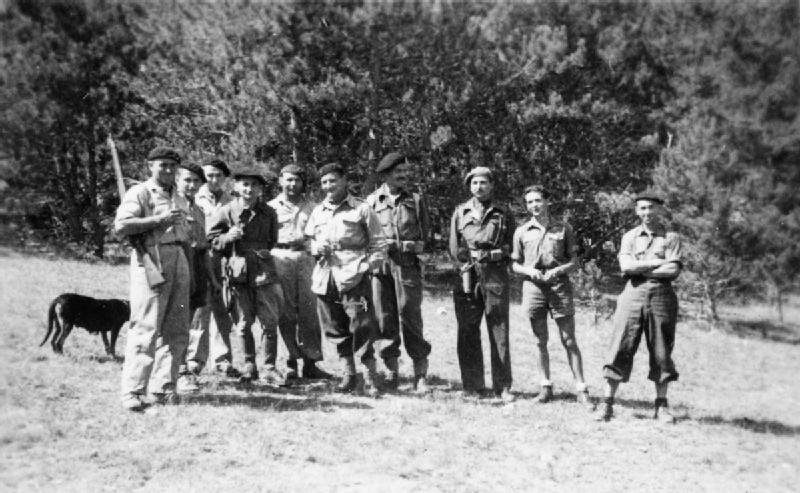
Maquisards (Resistance fighters) in the Hautes-Alpes département in August 1944. SOE agents are second from right, possibly Christine Granville, third John Roper, fourth, Robert Purvis.

In France, most agents were directed by two London-based country sections. F Section was under SOE control, while RF Section was linked to Charles de Gaulle's Free French Government in exile. Most native French agents served in RF. Two smaller sections also existed: the EU/P Section, which dealt with the Polish community in France, and the DF Section, which was responsible for establishing escape routes. During the latter part of 1942, another section known as AMF was established in Algiers, to operate into Southern France.

On 5 May 1941, Georges Bégué (1911–1993), a radio operator, became the first SOE agent parachuted into German-occupied France. The American, Virginia Hall, who arrived by boat in August 1941, was the first woman to serve for a lengthy period in France. Andrée Borrel (1919–1944) and Lise de Baissac (1905–2004) became the first women parachuted into France on 24 September 1942. A typical team of a network consisted of an organiser (leader), a radio operator, and a courier. Agents performed a variety of functions, including arms and sabotage instructors, couriers, liaison officers, and radio operators. Between Bégué's first drop in May 1941 and August 1944, more than 400 F Section agents were sent into occupied France. One hundred and four F section agents lost their lives, mostly by being captured and executed by the Germans. RF sent about the same number of agents; AMF sent 600 (although not all of these belonged to SOE). EU/P and DF sent a few dozen agents each.

Some networks were compromised, with the loss of many agents. In particular, agents continued to be sent to the "Prosper" network headed by Francis Suttill for months after it was controlled by the Germans and most of its agents had been captured. The head of F Section, Maurice Buckmaster was blamed by many as he failed to see signs that the network was compromised. To support the Allied invasion of France on D Day in June 1944, SOE and OSS supplemented their agents by air-dropping three-man parties of uniformed military personnel into France as part of Operation Jedburgh. They were to work with the French Resistance to coordinate widespread overt (as opposed to clandestine) acts of resistance. 100 men were eventually dropped, with 6,000 tons of military stores (4,000 tons had been dropped during the years before D-Day). At the same time, all the various sections operating in France (except EU/P) were nominally placed under a London-based HQ titled État-major des Forces Françaises de l'Intérieur (EMFFI).

It took many weeks for a full assessment of the contributions of SOE and the Jedburgh teams to the Allied landings in Normandy, but when it came, it vindicated Gubbins' belief that carefully planned sabotage could hinder a modern army. General Eisenhower's staff at the Supreme Headquarters of the Allied Expeditionary Force said that the Jedburghs had "succeeded in imposing more or less serious delays on all the divisions moved to Normandy". This had prevented Hitler from striking back in the crucial opening hours of Operation Overlord. The most "outstanding example was the delay to the 2nd SS Panzer Division", Eisenhower's staff said, and added a very personal endorsement, agreeing that the work carried out under Gubbins' leadership played a "very considerable part in our complete and final victory".

Many agents were captured, killed in action, executed, or died in German concentration camps. More than one-third of the 41 female agents of Section F did not survive the war; the death toll for more than 400 male agents was one-fourth, and the toll of thousands of French people helping SOE agents and networks was about one-fifth. Of 119 SOE agents captured by the Germans and deported to concentration camps in Germany, only 23 men and three women survived.

=== Poland ===
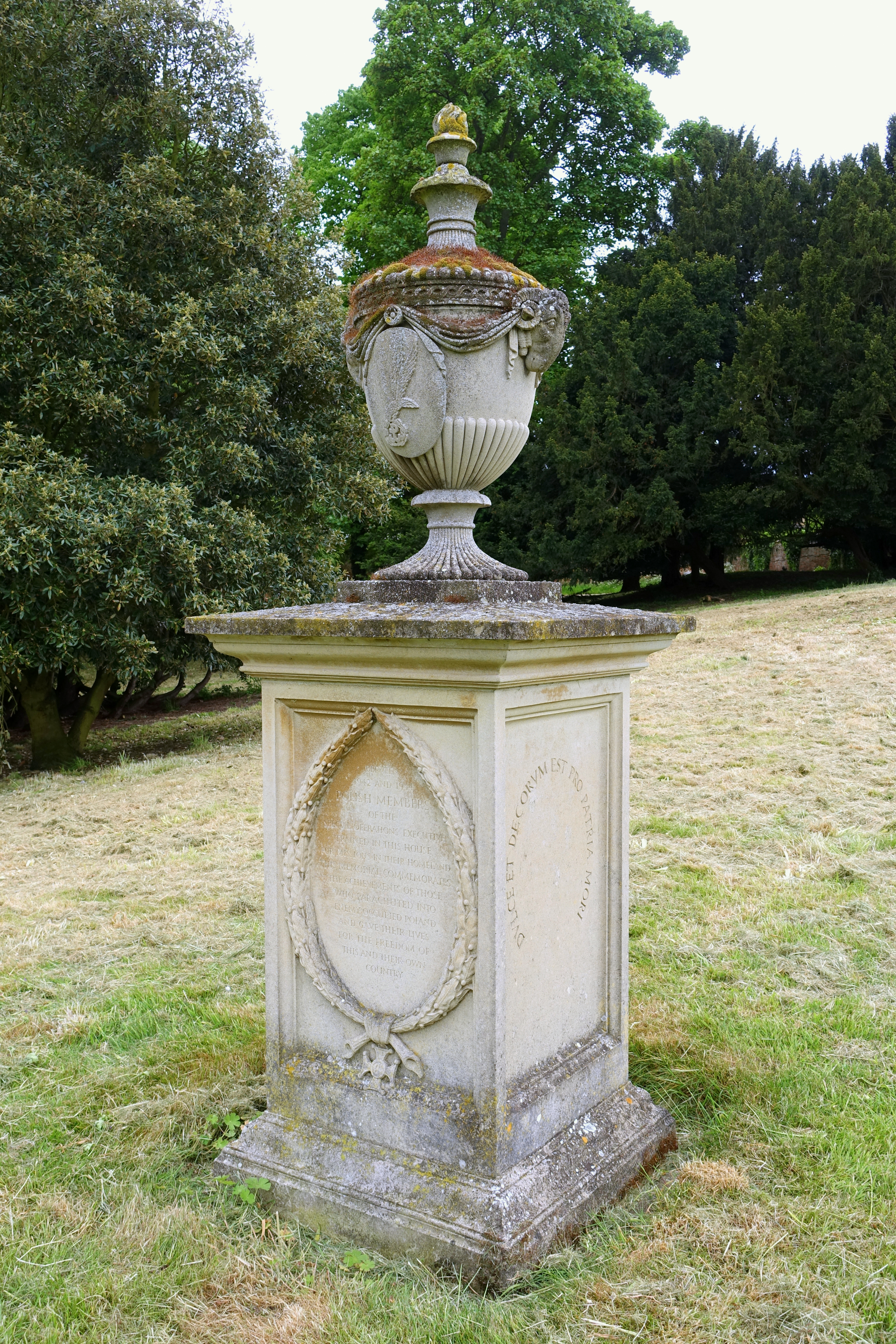
Memorial to Polish Members of the Special Operations Executive, 1942–1944, at Audley End House

SOE did not need to instigate Polish resistance, because unlike the Vichy French, the Poles overwhelmingly refused to collaborate with the Nazis with the exception of those who were antisemitic and anticommunist. Early in the war, the Poles established the Home Army, led by a clandestine resistance government known as the Polish Secret State. Nevertheless, many members of SOE were Polish, and the Polish resistance cooperated with them extensively. SOE assisted the Polish government in exile with training facilities and logistical support for its 605 special forces operatives known as the Cichociemni, or "The Dark and Silent". Members of the unit were trained at Special Training School 43 based at Audley End House in Essex, under the Polish operational supervision of Lieutenant Colonel Józef Hartman, before being parachuted into occupied Poland. Because of the distance involved in air travel to Poland, customised aircraft with extra fuel capacity were used in Polish operations such as Operation Wildhorn III. Sue Ryder, a war-time member of the First Aid Nursing Yeomanry, who worked with the Poles in Britain, later chose the title Baroness Ryder of Warsaw in honour of these operations.

Secret Intelligence Service member Krystyna Skarbek (nom de guerre Christine Granville) ran several operations in Poland and Hungary (with Andrzej Kowerski), from 1939-1941, in Egypt 1941-1944, and in France with SOE F (for French) Section in 1944. Having served in the Polish resistance Home Army since 1939, Elżbieta Zawacka reached Britain in May 1943, and became the only female member of the Polish elite Special Forces, the Cichociemni or Silent Unseen, therefore also the only woman in SOE P (for Polish) Section. Zawacka, like Jan Nowak-Jezioranski, reached Britain through Gibraltar on an established courier route out of occupied Europe. Maciej Kalenkiewicz was parachuted into occupied Poland, only to be killed by the Soviets. A Polish agent was integral to SOE's Operation Foxley, the plan to assassinate Hitler. Thanks to co-operation between SOE and the Home Army, the Poles were able to deliver the first Allied intelligence on the Holocaust to London in June 1942. Witold Pilecki of the Polish Home Army designed a joint operation with SOE to liberate Auschwitz, but the British rejected it as infeasible. Joint Anglo-Polish operations provided London with vital intelligence on the V-2 rocket, German troops' movements on the Eastern Front, and the Soviet repressions of Polish citizens. RAF 'Special Duties Flights' were sent to Poland to assist the Warsaw Uprising against the Nazis. The rebellion was defeated with a loss of 200,000 casualties (mostly German executions of Polish civilians) after the nearby Red Army refused military assistance to the Polish Home Army. RAF Special Duties Flights were refused landing rights at Soviet-held airfields near Warsaw, even when requiring emergency landings after battle damage. These flights were also attacked by Soviet fighters, despite the USSR's officially Allied status.

=== Germany ===
Due to the dangers and lack of a friendly population, few operations were conducted in Germany itself. The German and Austrian section of SOE was run by Lieutenant Colonel Ronald Thornley for most of the war, and was mainly involved with black propaganda and administrative sabotage in collaboration with the German section of the Political Warfare Executive. After D-Day, the section was reorganised and enlarged with Major General Gerald Templer heading the Directorate, with Thornley as his deputy.

Several major operations were planned, including Operation Foxley, a plan to assassinate Hitler, and Operation Periwig, an ingenious plan to simulate the existence of a large-scale anti-Nazi resistance movement within Germany. Foxley was never carried out but Periwig went ahead despite restrictions placed on it by SIS and SHAEF. Several German prisoners of war were trained as agents, briefed to make contact with the anti-Nazi resistance and to conduct sabotage. They were then parachuted into Germany in the hope that they would either hand themselves in to the Gestapo or be captured by them, and reveal their supposed mission. Fake coded wireless transmissions were broadcast to Germany, and various pieces of agent paraphernalia, such as code books and wireless receivers, were allowed to fall into the hands of the German authorities. In Austria, a resistance group formed around Kaplan Heinrich Maier. The Maier group was informed very early about the mass murder of Jews through its contacts with the Semperit factory near Auschwitz. SOE was in contact with this resistance group through its colleague G. E. R. Gedye in 1943, but was not convinced of the reliability of the contact and did not cooperate due to security concerns.

=== The Netherlands ===
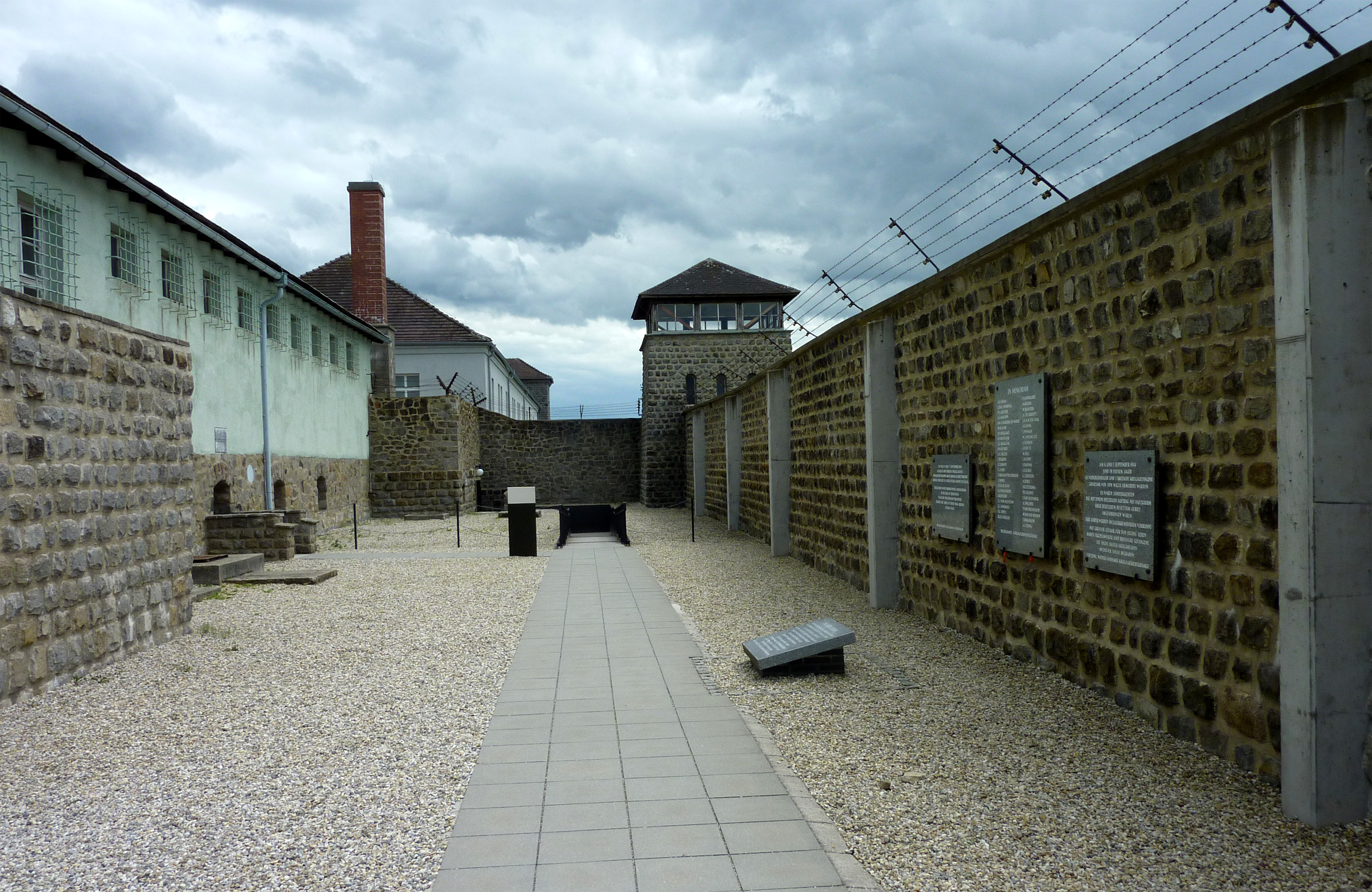
Mauthausen concentration camp, memorial plaques behind the Prison Block marking the spot where the ashes of the executed Englandspiel SOE agents are buried

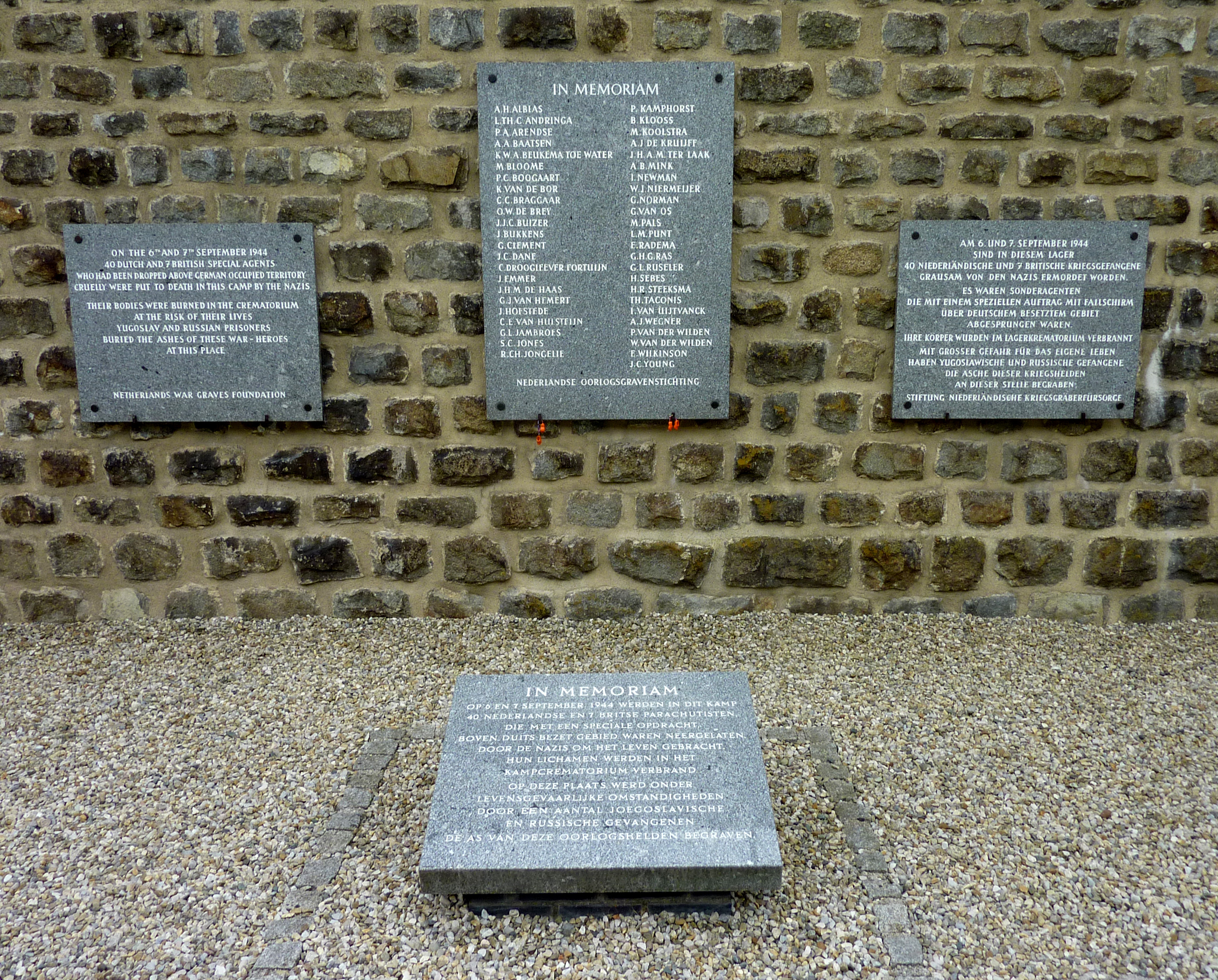
Englandspiel memorial plaques behind the Prison Block of the Mauthausen concentration camp

Section N of SOE ran operations in the Netherlands. They committed some of SOE's worst blunders in security, which allowed the Germans to capture many agents and much sabotage material, in what the Germans called the 'Englandspiel'. SOE ignored the absence of security checks in radio transmissions and other warnings that the Germans were running the supposed resistance networks. A total of 50 agents were caught by the Germans and brought to Camp Haaren in the South of the Netherlands. Five captured men managed to escape from the camp. Two of them, Pieter Dourlein and Ben Ubbink, escaped on 29 August 1943 and found their way to Switzerland. There, the Netherlands Embassy sent messages over their controlled sets to England that SOE Netherlands was compromised. SOE set up new elaborate networks, which continued to operate until the Netherlands was liberated at the end of the war. In September 1944, as Allied military forces were advancing into the Netherlands, the remaining captured SOE agents were taken by the Germans from Camp Haaren to Mauthausen concentration camp and executed.

From September 1944 to April 1945, eight Jedburgh teams were also active in the Netherlands. The first team, code-named "Dudley," was parachuted into the east of the Netherlands one week before Operation Market Garden. The next four teams were attached to the Airborne forces that carried out Market Garden. After the failure of Market Garden, one Jedburgh team trained (former) resistance men in the liberated South of the Netherlands. In April 1945, the last two Dutch Jedburgh teams became operational. One team code-named "Gambling" was a combined Jedburgh/Special Air Service (SAS) group that was dropped into the centre of the Netherlands to assist the Allied advance. The last team was parachuted into the Northern Netherlands as part of SAS operation "Amherst". Even though operating in the flat and densely populated Netherlands was very difficult for the Jedburghs, the teams were quite successful.

=== Belgium ===
Section T established some effective networks in Belgium, in part orchestrated by fashion designer Hardy Amies, who rose to the rank of lieutenant colonel. Amies adapted names of fashion accessories for use as code words while managing some of the most murderous and ruthless agents in the field. The rapid liberation of the country by Allied forces in September 1944 provided the resistance with little time to stage an uprising. They did assist the Allies to bypass German rearguards and enabled the Allies to capture the vital Port of Antwerp intact.

After Brussels was liberated, Amies outraged his superiors by setting up a Vogue photo shoot in Belgium. In 1946, he was knighted in Belgium for his service with SOE, being named an officer of the Order of the Crown.

=== Italy ===
As both an enemy country and supposedly a monolithic fascist state with no organised opposition which SOE could use, SOE made little effort in Italy before mid-1943, when Mussolini's government collapsed and Allied forces already occupied Sicily.

Two years earlier, in April 1941, in a mission codenamed "Yak", Peter Fleming had attempted to recruit agents from among the many thousands of Italian prisoners of war captured in the Western Desert Campaign. He recruited none. Attempts to search among Italian immigrants in the United States, Britain, and Canada for agents to be sent to Italy had similarly poor results. During the first three years of war, the most important "episode" of the collaboration between SOE and Italian anti-fascism was a project of an anti-fascist uprising in Sardinia, which SOE supported at some stage but did not receive approval from the Foreign Office.

In the aftermath of the Italian collapse, SOE (in Italy renamed No. 1 Special Force) helped build a large resistance organisation in the cities of Northern Italy, and in the Alps. Italian partisans harassed German forces in Italy throughout the autumn and winter of 1944, helped fleeing civilian refugees Jew or Gentile and Allied aircrew members who shot down or escaped POWs get safely to friendly lines and in the Spring 1945 offensive in Italy they captured Genoa and other cities unaided by Allied forces. SOE helped the Italian Resistance send British missions to the partisan formations and supply war material to the bands of patriots, a supply made without political prejudices, and which also helped the Communist formations (Brigate Garibaldi). Late in 1943, SOE established a base at Bari in Southern Italy, from which they operated their networks and agents in the Balkans. This organisation had the codename "Force 133". This later became "Force 266", reserving 133 for operations run from Cairo rather than the heel of Italy. Flights from Brindisi were run to the Balkans and Poland, particularly once control had been wrested from SOE's Cairo headquarters and was exercised directly by Gubbins. SOE established a new packing station for the parachute containers close to Brindisi Air base, along the lines of those created at Saffron Walden. This was ME 54, a factory employing hundreds, the American (OSS) side of which was known as "Paradise Camp".

=== Yugoslavia ===
1941, SOE helped considerably in anti-Axis propaganda and in preparing the Yugoslav coup d'état which overthrew the pro-Axis regent, Prince Paul. After the pro-British coup succeeded, the Axis Invasion of Yugoslavia ensued. In the aftermath of the German invasion and the Yugoslav capitulation, the Kingdom of Yugoslavia fragmented. Croatia had a substantial pro-Axis movement, the Ustaše. In Serbia and the remainder of Yugoslavia, two resistance movements formed: the royalist Chetniks under Draža Mihailović, and the Communist Partisans under Josip Broz Tito.

Mihailović was the first to attempt to contact the Allies, and SOE dispatched a party on 20 September 1941 under Major "Marko" Hudson. Hudson also encountered Tito's forces. Notable members of this party included actor Christopher Lee. Through the royalist government in exile, SOE at first supported the Chetniks. Eventually, however, due to reports that the Chetniks were less effective and even collaborating with German and Italian forces on occasion, British support was redirected to the Partisans, even before the Tehran Conference in 1943. Although relations were often touchy throughout the war, it can be argued that SOE's unstinting support was a factor in Yugoslavia's maintaining a neutral stance during the Cold War. However, accounts vary dramatically between all historical works on the "Chetnik controversy".

=== Hungary ===
SOE was unable to establish links or contacts in Hungary before the regime of Miklós Horthy aligned itself with the Axis powers. Distance and lack of such contacts prevented any effort being made by SOE until the Hungarians themselves dispatched a diplomat (László Veress) in a clandestine attempt to contact the Western Allies. SOE facilitated his return with some radio sets. Before the Allied governments could agree on terms, Hungary was placed under German military occupation, and Veress was forced to flee the country.

Two missions subsequently dropped "blind," i.e., without prior arrangement for a reception party, failed. So too did an attempt by Basil Davidson to incite a partisan movement in Hungary, after he made his way there from northeastern Yugoslavia.

=== Greece ===
Greece was eventually overrun by the Axis after a decisive win over the Italians and a significant defence lasting several months, which also caused a major diversion of German forces, subsequently delaying the invasion of the Soviet Union. This was the first serious setback suffered by the Axis forces and resulted in Churchill saying that "from now on we will say heroes fight like Greeks!". In the aftermath, SIS and another intelligence organisation, SIME, discouraged attempts at sabotage or resistance as this might imperil relations with Turkey, although SOE maintained contacts with resistance groups in Crete. In late 1942, at the army's instigation, SOE mounted its first operation, codenamed Operation Harling, into Greece in an attempt to disrupt the railway which was being used to move materials to the German Panzer Army Africa. A party under Colonel (later Brigadier) Eddie Myers, assisted by Christopher Woodhouse, was parachuted into Greece and discovered two guerrilla groups operating in the mountains: the pro-Communist ELAS and the republican EDES. On 25 November 1942, Myers's party blew up one of the spans of the railway viaduct at Gorgopotamos, supported by 150 Greek partisans from these two organisations who engaged Italians guarding the viaduct. This cut the railway linking Thessaloniki with Athens and Piraeus.

Relations between the resistance groups and the British soured. When the British needed once again to disrupt the railway across Greece as part of the deception operations preceding Operation Husky, the Allied invasion of Sicily, the resistance groups refused to take part, rightly fearing German reprisals against civilians. Instead, a six-man commando party from the British and New Zealand armies, led by New Zealander Lieutenant Colonel Cecil Edward Barnes, a civil engineer, carried out the destruction of the Asopos viaduct on 21 June 1943. Two attempts by Mike Cumberlege to make the Corinth Canal unnavigable ended in failure.

EDES received most aid from SOE, but ELAS secured many weapons when Italy collapsed and Italian military forces in Greece dissolved. ELAS and EDES fought a vicious civil war in 1943 until SOE brokered an uneasy armistice (the Plaka agreement). A lesser-known, but important function of SOE in Greece was to inform the Cairo headquarters of the movement of the German military aircraft that were serviced and repaired at the two former Greek military aircraft facilities in and around Athens. Eventually, the British Army occupied Athens and Piraeus in the aftermath of the German withdrawal, and fought a street-by-street battle to drive ELAS from these cities and impose an interim government under Archbishop Damaskinos. SOE's last act was to evacuate several hundred disarmed EDES fighters to Corfu, preventing their massacre by ELAS. Several resistance groups and Allied stay-behind parties operated in Crete after the Germans occupied the island in the Battle of Crete. SOE's operations involved figures such as Patrick Leigh Fermor, John Lewis, Harry Rudolph Fox Burr, Tom Dunbabin, Sandy Rendel, John Houseman, Xan Fielding, and Bill Stanley Moss. Some of the most famous moments included the abduction of General Heinrich Kreipe led by Leigh Fermor and Moss – subsequently portrayed in the film Ill Met by Moonlight, and the sabotage of Damasta led by Moss.

=== Albania ===
Albania had been under Italian influence since 1923, and was occupied by the Italian Army in 1939. In 1943, a small liaison party entered Albania from northwestern Greece. SOE agents who entered Albania then or later included Julian Amery, Anthony Quayle, David Smiley, Peter Kemp and Neil "Billy" McLean. They discovered another internecine war between the Communist partisans under Enver Hoxha, and the republican Balli Kombëtar. As the latter had collaborated with the Italian occupiers, Hoxha gained Allied support. SOE's envoy to Albania, Brigadier Edmund "Trotsky" Davies, was captured by the Germans early in 1944. Some SOE officers warned that Hoxha's aim was primacy after the war, rather than fighting the Germans. They were ignored, but Albania was never a major factor in the effort against the Germans.

=== Czechoslovakia ===
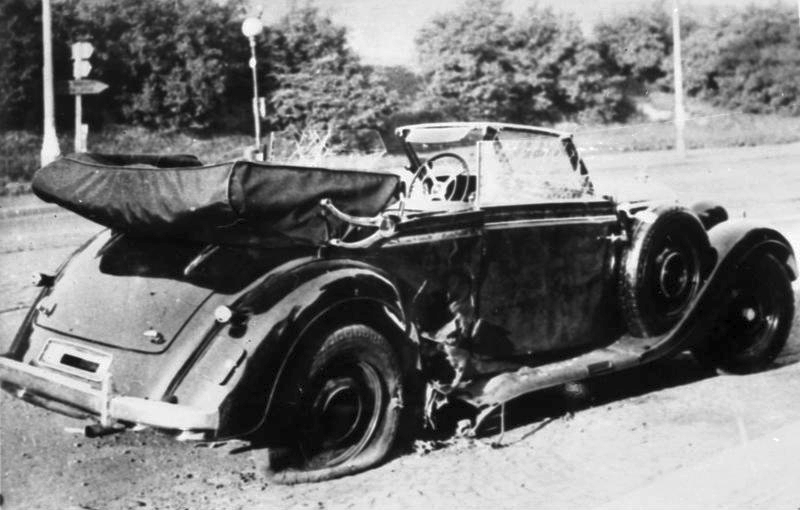
The car in which Reinhard Heydrich was assassinated

SOE sent many missions into the Czech areas of the so-called Protectorate of Bohemia and Moravia, and later into Slovakia. The most famous mission was Operation Anthropoid, the assassination of SS-Obergruppenführer Reinhard Heydrich in Prague. From 1942 to 1943, the Czechoslovaks had their own Special Training School (STS) at Chicheley Hall in Buckinghamshire. In 1944, SOE sent men to support the Slovak National uprising.

=== Norway ===
In March 1941, a group performing commando raids in Norway, Norwegian Independent Company 1 (NOR.I.C.1) was organised under the leadership of Captain Martin Linge. Their initial raid in 1941 was Operation Archery; the best-known raid was probably the Norwegian heavy water sabotage. Communication lines with London were gradually improved so that by 1945, 64 radio operators were spread throughout Norway.

=== Denmark ===
The Danish resistance assisted SOE in its activities in neutral Sweden. For example, SOE was able to obtain several shiploads of vital ball-bearings which had been interned in Swedish ports. The Danes also pioneered several secure communications methods; for example, a burst transmitter/receiver which transcribed Morse code onto or from a paper tape faster than a human operator could handle.

=== Romania ===
Shortly after the establishment of the SOE, the "Romania section of SOE" was formed with the mission of sabotaging oil shipments from Romania to Germany and attempting to form a resistance movement mainly by keeping close contact with the pro-British political actors. An SOE network in Romania was set up by engineer Valeriu "Rică" Georgescu (code-named "Jockey") in February 1941. The role of this network was to gather military and economic intelligence and to maintain contact between Iuliu Maniu and the British Government. Until its discovery and fall in August 1941, the network proved an invaluable asset by supplying the British with information gathered from the German High Command in Bucharest, such as the German plans to invade the USSR.

Although arrested by the Romanian authorities, Georgescu maintained his contacts with the SOE. To better establish connections with Maniu and the opposition, a first SOE mission, code-named "Ranji", was sent to Romania in June 1943. The mission, led by Captain Thomas Russell, was dropped into Yugoslavia and made its way to Romania, where it continued to operate until Russell was killed in September of the same year. The mission did succeed in delivering a radio set and a radioman to Maniu's supporters. In December 1943, another SOE delegation under the code name Operation Autonomous was parachuted into Romania. The delegation, including Colonel Gardyne de Chastelain, Captain Silviu Mețianu, and Ivor Porter, was captured by the Romanian Gendarmerie and held until the night of King Michael's Coup on 23 August 1944. The task of Autonomous was to attempt again to establish direct contact with Maniu and establish the details of an eventual coup against Antonescu, and in case of capture to inform Antonescu of the British government's attitude towards Romania and to advise him in sending emissaries to discuss the Allied armistice terms.

=== Abyssinia ===
Abyssinia was the scene of some of SOE's earliest and most successful efforts. SOE organised a force of Ethiopian irregulars under Orde Charles Wingate in support of the exiled Emperor Haile Selassie. This force (named Gideon Force by Wingate) caused heavy casualties to the Italian occupation forces and contributed to the successful British campaign there. Wingate was to use his experience to create the Chindits in Burma.

=== West Africa ===
The neutral Spanish island of Fernando Po was the scene of Operation Postmaster, one of SOE's most successful exploits. The large Italian merchant vessel Duchessa d'Aosta and the German tug Likomba had taken refuge in the harbour of Santa Isabel. On 14 January 1942, while the ships' officers were attending a party ashore thrown by an SOE agent, commandos and SOE personnel led by Gus March-Phillipps boarded the two vessels, cut the anchor cables and towed them out to sea, where they later rendezvoused with Royal Navy ships. Several neutral authorities and observers were impressed by the British display of ruthlessness.

=== Southeast Asia ===
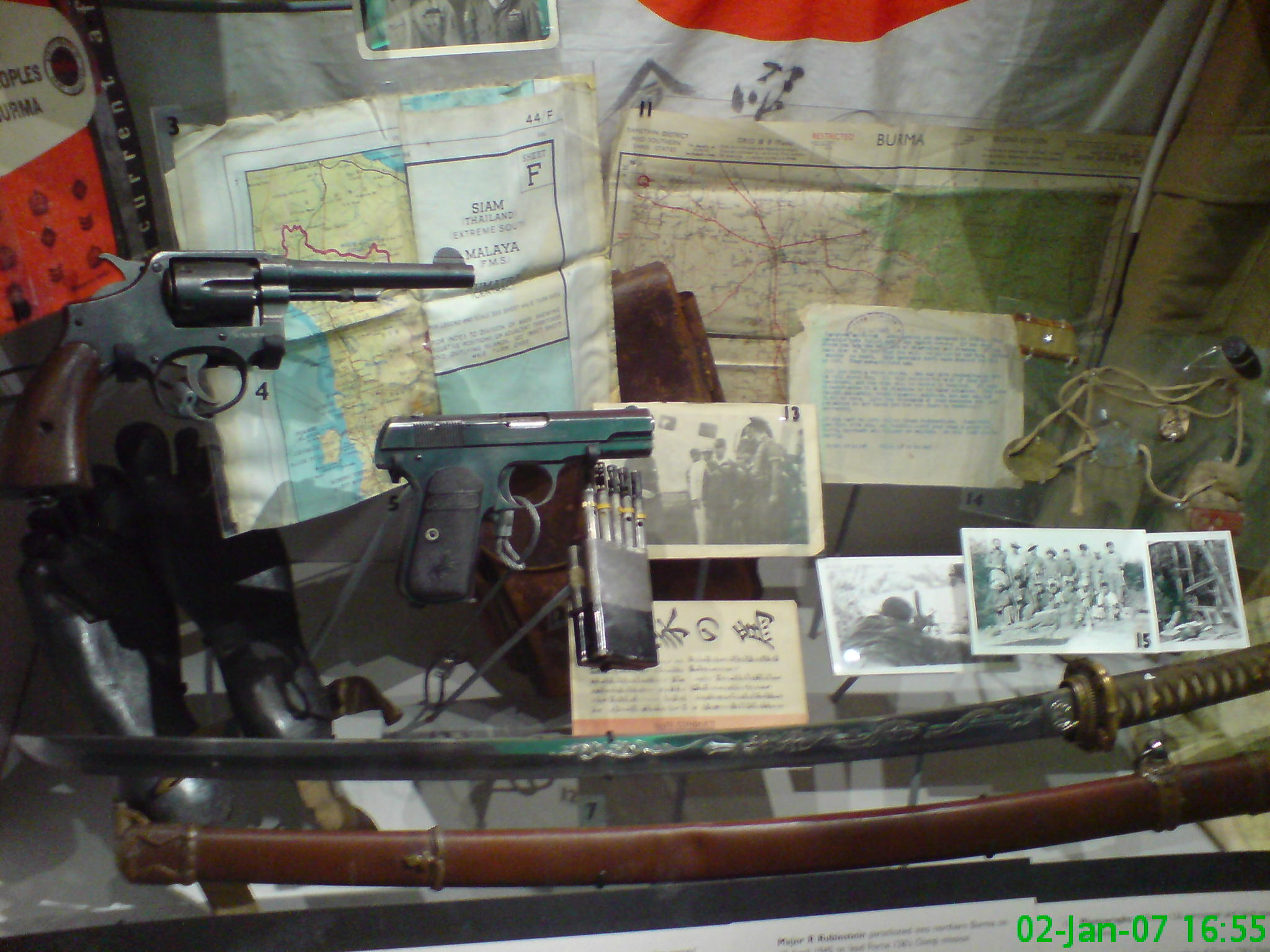
War in the Far East exhibit in the Imperial War Museum London. Among the collection are a Japanese Good Luck Flag, operational map (numbered 11), photographs of Force 136 personnel and guerillas in Burma (15), a katana that was surrendered to a SOE officer in Gwangar, Malaya in September 1945 (7), and rubber soles designed by SOE to be worn under agents' boots to disguise footprints when landing on beaches (bottom left).

As early as 1940, SOE was preparing plans for operations in Southeast Asia. As in Europe, after initial Allied military disasters, SOE built up indigenous resistance organisations and guerrilla armies in enemy (Japanese) occupied territory. SOE also launched "Operation Remorse" (1944–45), which was ultimately aimed at protecting the economic and political status of Hong Kong. Force 136 engaged in covert trading of goods and currencies in China. Its agents proved remarkably successful, raising £77m through their activities, which were used to assist Allied prisoners of war and, more controversially, to buy influence locally to facilitate a smooth return to pre-war conditions.

== Dissolution ==
In late 1944, as it became clear that the war would soon be over, Lord Selborne advocated keeping SOE or a similar body in being, and that it would report to the Ministry of Defence. Anthony Eden, the Foreign Secretary, insisted that his ministry, already responsible for the SIS, should control SOE or its successors. The Joint Intelligence Committee, which had a broad co-ordinating role over Britain's intelligence services and operations, took the view that SOE was a more effective organisation than the SIS but that it was unwise to split the responsibility for espionage and more direct action between separate ministries, or to perform special operations outside the ultimate control of the Chiefs of Staff. The debate continued for several months until, on 22 May 1945, Selborne wrote:

In view of the Russian menace, the situation in Italy, Central Europe, and the Balkans, and the smouldering volcanoes in the Middle East, I think it would be madness to allow SOE to be stifled at this juncture. In handing it over to the Foreign Office, I cannot help feeling that to ask Sir Orme Sergent [sic] [shortly to become Permanent Under-Secretary of State for Foreign Affairs] to supervise SOE is like inviting an abbess to supervise a brothel! But SOE is no base instrument, it is a highly specialized weapon which will be required by HMG whenever we are threatened and whenever it is necessary to contact the common people of foreign lands.

Churchill took no immediate decision, and after he lost the general election on 5 July 1945, the matter was dealt with by the Labour Prime Minister, Clement Attlee. Selborne informed Attlee that SOE still maintained a worldwide network of clandestine radio stations and sympathizers. Attlee replied that he had no wish to own a British Comintern, and closed Selborne's network down at 48 hours' notice. SOE was dissolved officially on 15 January 1946. Some of its senior staff moved easily into financial services in the City of London. However, some of them had not lost their undercover mentality and did little for the City's name. Most of SOE's other personnel reverted to their peacetime occupations or regular service in the armed forces, but 280 of them were taken into the "Special Operations Branch" of MI6. Some of these had served as agents in the field, but MI6 was most interested in SOE's training and research staff. Sir Stewart Menzies, the head of MI6 (who was generally known simply as "C") soon decided that a separate Special Operations branch was unsound, and merged it into the general body of MI6. Gubbins, the last director, was not given further employment by the Army, but he later founded the Special Forces Club for former members of SOE and similar organisations.

== Wartime commentaries on SOE ==
Although the wartime British government considered the activities of SOE to be lawful, the German invaders, as in World War I and the War of 1870, argued that those engaging in resistance (local resistance fighters and the agents of foreign governments who supported them) were "bandits" and "terrorists", maintaining that all Francs-tireurs (and said agents) were engaging in an illegal form of warfare, and, as such, had no legal rights. A view expressed by Fritz Sauckel, the General Plenipotentiary for Labour Deployment, making him the man in charge of bringing workers to the factories in Germany for forced labour, who demanded the flight of young French men to the countryside be stopped and called the maquis "terrorists", "bandits" and "criminals" for their opposition to lawful authority.

== Later analysis and commentaries ==
The mode of warfare encouraged and promoted by SOE is considered by several modern commentators to have established the modern model that many alleged terrorist organisations emulate. Two opposed views were quoted by Tony Geraghty in The Irish War: The Hidden Conflict Between the IRA and British Intelligence. M. R. D. Foot, who wrote several official histories of SOE, wrote,

The Irish [thanks to the example set by Collins and followed by SOE] can thus claim that their resistance provides the originating impulse for resistance to tyrannies worse than any they had to endure themselves. And the Irish resistance, as Collins led it, showed the rest of the world a way to fight wars, the only sane way they can be fought in the age of the Nuclear bomb.

The British military historian John Keegan wrote

We must recognise that our response to the scourge of terrorism is compromised by what we did through SOE. The justification ... That we had no other means of striking back at the enemy ... is exactly the argument used by the Red Brigades, the Baader-Meinhoff gang, the PFLP, the IRA and every other half-articulate terrorist organisation on Earth. Futile to argue that we were a democracy and Hitler a tyrant. Means besmirch ends. SOE besmirched Britain.

Keegan also questioned the effectiveness of SOE. He wrote

SOE was inefficient as an organization, unnecessarily dangerous to work for, ineffective in its pursuit of its aims, and counter-productive in the results achieved.

Another, later view, on the moral contribution of SOE, was expressed by the writer Max Hastings

Yet the moral contribution of secret war, which would have been impossible without the sponsorship of SOE and OSS, was beyond price. It made possible the resurrection of self-respect in occupied societies which would otherwise have been forced to look back on the successive chapters of their experience of the conflict through a dark prism: military humiliation, followed by enforced collaboration with the enemy, followed by belated deliverance at the hands of foreign armies. As it was, and entirely thanks to Resistance, all European nations could cherish their cadres of heroes and martyrs, enabling the mass of their citizens who did nothing, or who served the enemy, to be painted over in the grand canvas cherished in the perception of their descendants.

== In popular culture ==
Since the end of the war, SOE has appeared in many films, comics, books, and television. In the Marvel Cinematic Universe, Peggy Carter was recommended to SOE by her brother Michael, where she starts her career as a field agent. SOE is portrayed in the movie Allied. British science-fiction author Charles Stross' book series The Laundry Files takes place within the Q-division of SOE (known as the eponymous Laundry), which has remained in operation since WWII, due to their mission to save the world from occult threats. Portraying a heavily fictionalized version of Operation Postmaster, a Guy Ritchie-directed film called The Ministry of Ungentlemanly Warfare starring Henry Cavill as Gus March-Phillipps and Alan Ritchson as Anders Lassen, was released on 19 April 2024.

SOE appears first in Call of Duty: United Offensive after the protagonist is shot down over the Netherlands, joining SOE after blowing up a train. SOE appears again in Call of Duty: WWII when the protagonist teams up with the British to destroy a Nazi train, then again to liberate Paris. In the 1968 WWII novel The Military Philosophers, the major but off-stage character of Syzmanski (known only by his last name) is intended to be a Special Operations Executive. While working on the novel, author Anthony Powell stated in correspondence with publisher Roland Gant his plan for the character: "I am already committed to this name [Syzmanski] for a rather sinister character, who does not appear but has a SOE role." Syzmanski is a former Free France fighter sprung from military detention to serve in a shadowy capacity as a maverick agent for the Allies, although his official position is never named. Powell himself served in Military Intelligence during the war.

== See also ==
- Bureau central de renseignements et d'action
- Churchill's Secret Agents: The New Recruits
- Edmund Charaszkiewicz
- Escape and evasion lines (World War II)
- Jean Overton Fuller
- John Dolphin
- List of defunct paramilitary organizations
- Operation Braddock
- Special Activities Center
- Special Allied Airborne Reconnaissance Force
- Z Special Unit
