= Creslow =

Village in Buckinghamshire, England

Coordinates: 51.8899°N 0.8236°W

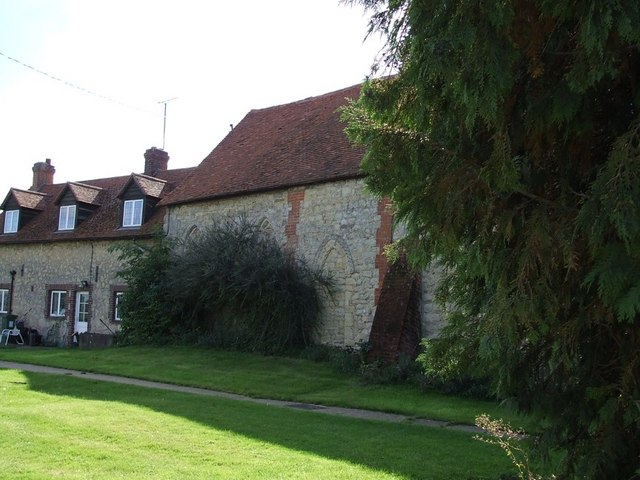
- The Old Chapel, Creslow, 2006

- Location within Buckinghamshire
- Population: 22 (Mid-2010 pop est)
- OS grid reference: SP815215
- Civil parish: Creslow
- Unitary authority: Buckinghamshire
- Ceremonial county: Buckinghamshire
- Region: South East
- Country: England
- Sovereign state: United Kingdom
- Post town: AYLESBURY
- Postcode district: HP22
- Dialling code: 01296
- Police: Thames Valley
- Fire: Buckinghamshire
- Ambulance: South Central
- UK Parliament: Aylesbury

Creslow (occasionally also known as Christlow) is a village and civil parish within Aylesbury Vale district in Buckinghamshire, England. It is close to Whitchurch, about six and a half miles from Aylesbury. It is in the civil parish of Whitchurch.

The village name is Anglo Saxon in origin, Cærsehlaw, meaning 'cress hill'. It was recorded in the Domesday Book of 1086 as Cresselai. At the time the manor was owned by Wulfwynn of Creslow.

In the Victorian era and much admired then, there was just one house left in the village, the manor house, which dated from the 14th century. It was then the property of Lord Clifford but has also now disappeared.

The church at Creslow, which dates from the 13th century, was formerly owned by the Knights Hospitaller (the Order of St John of Jerusalem). Following the dissolution of the Monasteries it was held by the Crown, and the whole of the manor was used as pasture for the cattle of the Royal Household. The ecclesiastical parish was abolished by Queen Elizabeth I and the building itself was demolished during the English Civil War, by the regicide Cornelius Holland, and was never replaced.

More recently Creslow was the site of a Foreign and Commonwealth Office/MI6 signals intelligence station, which was closed down in 1998 and, now in private hands, operates as a data processing facility and fibre optic hub under the name Creslow Park.
