= Richard Winwood (MP) =

English politician (1609–1688)

Richard Winwood (15 April 1609 – 28 June 1688) of Quainton, Buckinghamshire was an English landowner and politician who sat in the House of Commons at various times between 1641 and 1685.

== Biography ==
Winwood was the eldest surviving son of Sir Ralph Winwood and his wife Elizabeth, daughter of Nicholas Ball of Totnes, and stepdaughter of Sir Thomas Bodley. His father was Secretary of State in the time of King James I and was granted Ditton Park in Buckinghamshire. He was educated at Eton College from 1616 to 1626. His father died in 1617 and left the estates to his mother for his lifetime. However, in around 1640 he acquired the manor of Wexham.

In 1641, Winwood was elected member of parliament for Windsor in the Long Parliament.

In December 1648, he was excluded from parliament under Pride's Purge and ejected from various commissions. He was J.P. again from about 1653 to 1656 and a commissioner for assessment for Buckinghamshire in 1657. In 1659 he succeeded to the Ditton Park estate on the death of his mother. He also inherited the manors of Bawdeswell and Sparham in Norfolk, which he subsequently sold to Alexander Pitfield of London.

In March 1660, Winwood was commissioner for militia for Berkshire and Buckinghamshire and became JP for Buckinghamshire until 1680. In April 1660 he stood for Windsor for the Convention Parliament but his election was declared void. In August 1660 he became commissioner for assessment until 1680. He was unsuccessful when he stood for Buckinghamshire in 1661. He was commissioner for oyer and terminer for the Norfolk circuit in 1661.

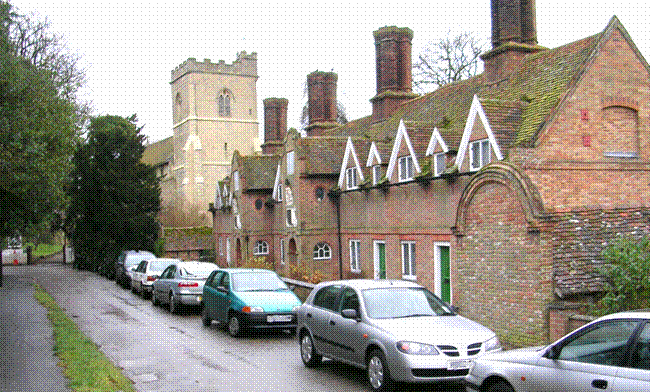
Winwood's almshouses in Quainton, Buckinghamshire

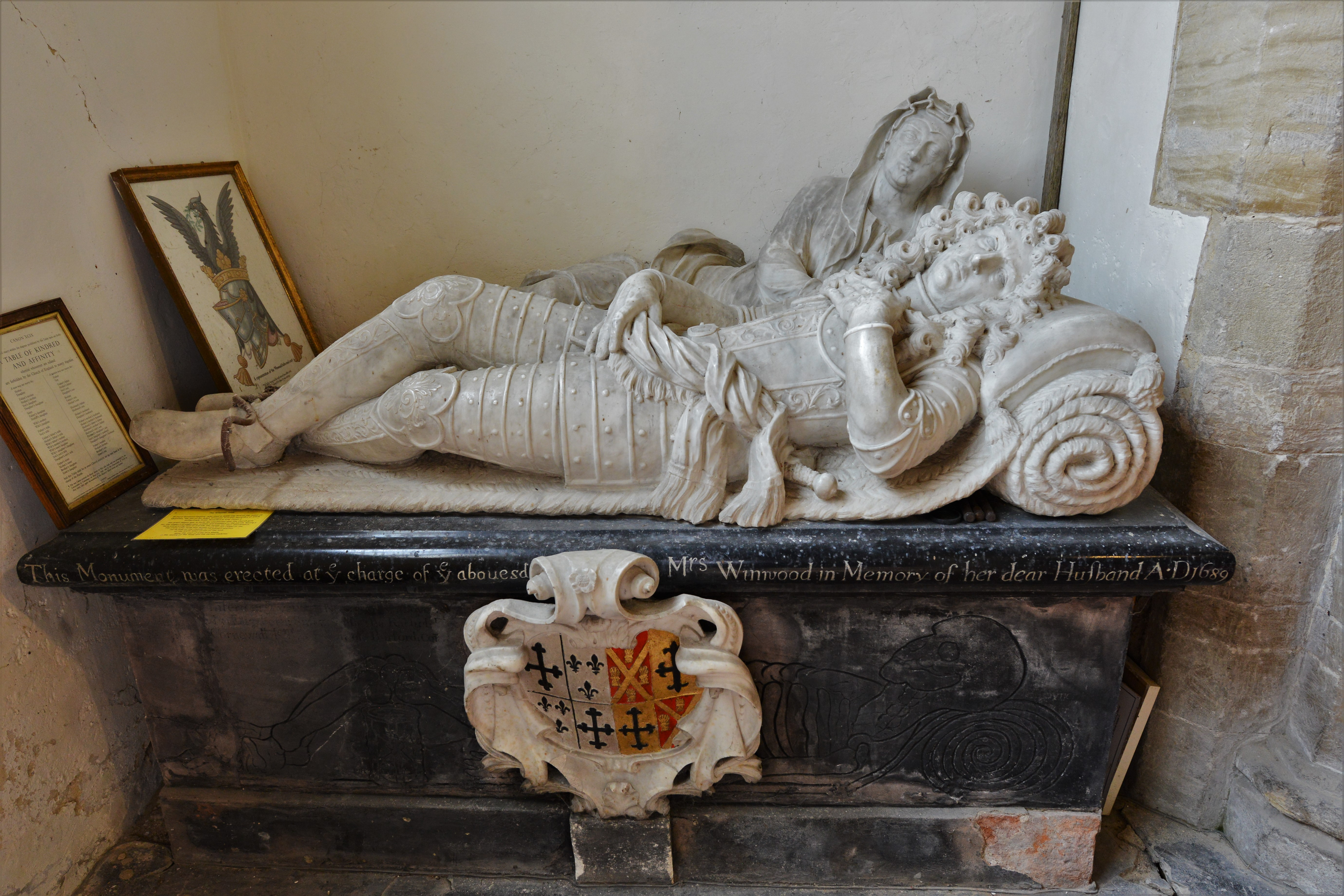
Richard Winwood memorial, Holy Cross and St. Mary Church, Quainton

Winwood became Deputy Lieutenant again in 1670 until 1680 and was commissioner for recusants for Buckinghamshire in 1675. He was commissioner for assessment for Berkshire from 1679 to 1680. In April 1679 he was elected MP for Windsor and was elected for Windsor again in November 1680, sitting until March 1685. He was J.P. and Deputy Lieutenant for Buckinghamshire from February 1688 until his death. He was a shareholder in the New River Company, and possessed estates in Suffolk as well as Buckinghamshire and Norfolk. He provided for the building of almshouses at Quainton.

Winwood died on 1688 at the age of 79 and was buried at Quainton church. His magnificent tomb was carved by Thomas Stayner of London.

== Family ==
Winwood had married Anne Reade, daughter of Sir Thomas Reade of Barton Court, Abingdon, Berkshire. They had no children and his widow survived to 1 March 1694. One of his sisters, Anne Winwood married Edward Montagu, 2nd Baron Montagu of Boughton and their son Ralph Montagu, 1st Duke of Montagu inherited the Ditton Park estate.

Parliament of England
Preceded by Cornelius Holland; William Taylor	Member of Parliament for Windsor; 1641–1648; With: Cornelius Holland	Succeeded by Cornelius Holland
