= Thomas Stayner =

British sculptor

Thomas Stayner or Stainer (1665–1733) was a 17th/18th century British sculptor.

== Life ==
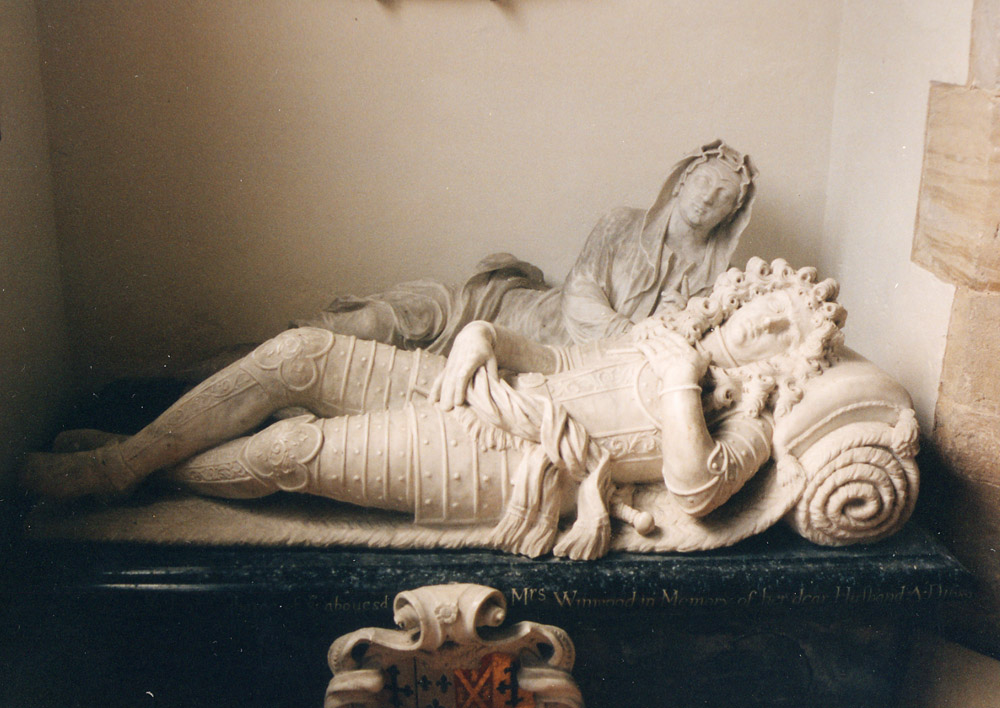
Winwood tomb at St Mary's, Quainton

He was born in the parish of St Giles-in-the-Fields in London in 1665 the son of Thomas Stayner (b.1640), a painter and stainer, and his wife Margery Fisher (b.1643). He was apprenticed as a mason rather than a stainer - to Michael Todd in 1682 and was declared a Freeman in 1690. By 1694 he had two apprentices of his own, including his younger brother Anthony Stayner.

In 1697 he was living at Goodmans Fields in the Whitechapel district of East London. By 1715 he had moved to Bow Bridge

He made rapid progress in the Worshipful Company of Masons and in 1709 was chosen as Master of the Company. However, in 1720 the Company records show him as being summoned to explain his behaviour at the Sir John Fryer Lord Mayor of London's dinner, and he was fined 6s 8d for this offence.

He died 7 October 1733 in West Hampton, London. He was buried at Corpus Christi College, Oxford.

== Family ==
He married Dorothy Bass at Temple Church in London on 12 February 1684. They had four sons and four daughters.

Their eldest son, also Thomas Stayner, inherited his house and business.

== Works ==
- Memorial to Anne and Richard Winwood (MP) in St Marys in Quainton (1691) - two recumbent figures
- Memorial to Dr Thomas Turner at Stowe Nine Churches (1714) two standing figures
- Memorial to Sir Henry Bendyshe at Steeple Bumpstead (1717) -reclining figure
- Monument to Sir Ralph Radcliffe (1633-1720) in Hitchin Parish Church (1721)
- Decorative work at the brewery of Ambrose Page at Bow (1721)
- Memorial to Lady Goselin at Morningthorpe (1723)
- Monument to Sir Richard Hoare at St Dunstan-in-the-West (1725)
- Monument to Ann Cheeke, Lady Tipping wife of Sir Thomas Tipping, 1st Baronet at Pyrgo Park (1726)
