= Wulfwynn of Creslow =

English landowner

- Occupation: Landowner

Wulfwynn of Creslow (fl. 1086) was one of the largest landowners in 11th century England. She owned many estates across England as written in the Domesday Book.

== Biography ==
Wulfwynn hailed from Creslow, a village in Buckinghamshire. She may have been the mother of Edward of Salisbury. Wulfwynn was one of the richest women in England in 1086, holding ten manors across southern England.

According to the Domesday Book, she was lord of the following manors: Aston Clinton, Canford Magna, Chelsea, Chitterne, Creslow, Great Gaddesden, Hinton Charterhouse, Hinton Waldrist, Kinson, Poole Keynes and Winterbourne Earls.
