= Bolbec Castle =

- Buckinghamshire, England
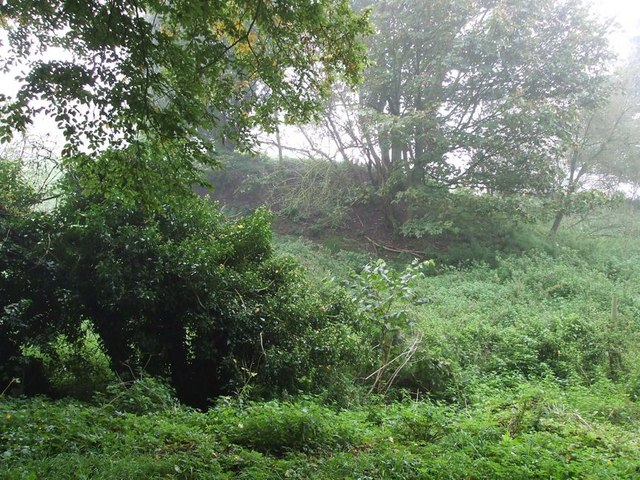
- Bolebec Castle motte

Site information
- Type: Castle
- Condition: Demolished

Location
- Shown within Buckinghamshire
- Coordinates: 51.880356°N 0.839559°W

Site history
- Materials: Masonry

Bolbec Castle or Bolebec Castle, was a castle in the village of Whitchurch, Buckinghamshire, England.

== History ==
The motte and bailey castle was illegally built for Hugh II de Bolbec, Lord of Whitchurch during the Anarchy of 1147 and its building was criticized by Pope Eugene III.

It is thought to have had a masonry keep and the deep defences of the motte enhanced naturally defensive ground. The triangular bailey is now separated from its motte by Castle Lane.

Oliver Cromwell was responsible for its destruction in the English Civil War (1642–51).

The surviving earthworks are a scheduled monument.

== See also ==
- Castles in Great Britain and Ireland
- English feudal barony
- List of castles in England

== Sources and further reading ==
- Page, W.H., ed. (1925). "Whitchurch". A History of the County of Buckingham, Volume 3. Victoria County History. pp. 442–449.
- Pettifer, Adrian (1995). English Castles: A Guide by Counties. Woodbridge: Boydell Press. p. 9. ISBN 0-85115-600-2.
