= Edward of Salisbury =

11th-century English nobleman and courtier

Edward of Salisbury was a nobleman and courtier (curialis), probably part Anglo-Saxon, who served as High Sheriff of Wiltshire during the reigns of William I, William II and Henry I.

The Chronicon Abbatiae Rameseiensis (1293) names him as a justice during the reign of Edward the Confessor. He may have been sheriff as early as 1070, he was certainly in that office by 1081, and perhaps carried on there until as late as February or March 1105, when he appears in a long list of sheriffs who witnessed a charter of Henry I. He probably served Henry as a chamberlain. As sheriff Edward received the reeveland and a certain pence pertaining the shrievalty as personal property, under certain obligations. A different man, Walter Hosate, possessed the shrievalty of Wiltshire in 1107.

According to Domesday Book (1086), Edward held five hides of land at Salisbury from Bishop Herman in 1086. His manors in Wiltshire included Wilcot, where he had "a very good house", Alton Barnes, and Etchilhampton, all held "of the king", making him a tenant-in-chief (baron). That no holder of these manors before the Norman Conquest is cited suggests that Edward, whose name was Anglo-Saxon, may have held them both before and after 1066. He may also have been the castellan of the royal castle at Salisbury. In Middlesex, he was tenant-in-chief of Chelsea.

Edward's predecessor in many of his manors was a certain Wulfwynn, perhaps his mother. Edward had augmented Chitterne, one of Wulfwynn's estates, with lands formerly owned by two thegns, Kenwin and Azor. These may have been family estates, subsequently enlarged by the grant of the manors of North Tidworth, Ludgershall and Shrewton, once held by a thegn named Alfward. It is clear from sources of a century later that all of Edward's manors owed heavy knight-service to the Crown.

Edward had a (probably younger) son, also Edward, who held land at Rogerville and Raimes in the Duchy of Normandy and who once witnessed a charter there of William de Tancarville. This may indicate that Edward was of mixed Anglo-Norman extraction, and perhaps emigrated to England during the reign of Edward the Confessor. The Edward of Salisbury mentioned by Orderic Vitalis as having fought with Henry I in Normandy in 1119 was probably the younger. His later descendants, who founded Lacock Abbey, claimed that he was descended from Gerold of Roumare.

Another son, Walter of Salisbury, founded Bradenstoke Priory and was father to Patrick, the first Earl of Salisbury, and Sybil. Sybil married John Marshal and through this marriage, Edward of Salisbury became the great-grandfather of William Marshal.

A daughter, Matilda (Maud), inherited a large number of estates and passed them on to her husband, Humphrey I de Bohun.

== Bibliography ==
- Judith A. Green. The Aristocracy of Norman England. New York: Cambridge University Press, 1997.
- W. A. Morris. "The Office of Sheriff in the Early Norman Period." The English Historical Review 33 (1918): 145–75.
- W. A. Morris. "The Sheriffs and the Administrative System of Henry I." The English Historical Review 37 (1922): 161–72.
- J. R. Planché. The Conqueror and his Companions, vol. II. London, 1874.
- H. E. Salter. "A Dated Charter of Henry I." The English Historical Review 26 (1911): 487–91.
- Graeme White. "Bohun, Humphrey (III) de (b. before 1144, d. 1181)." Oxford Dictionary of National Biography. Oxford University Press, 2004, accessed 20 December 2009.
