= Cornelius Holland (regicide) =

Cornelius Holland (1599 – c. 1671), was a politician who served as an member of parliament. Born London, England; died possibly at Lausanne, Switzerland about 1671, after he was wanted for his part in the regicide of Charles I of England.

Holland is alleged to have been the chief hand in drawing up the charges against King Charles I, although he was not present when the sentence of death was pronounced, nor does his name appear on the warrant of execution. In February 1649, he was appointed to Council of State and was reappointed the next years.

Holland lived for a time at Creslow Manor House which he remodelled ca. 1646. This manor house is mentioned in Chambers Book of Days under June 23:

While Creslow pastures continued in possession of the Crown, they were committed to the custody of a keeper. In 1596, James Quarles, Esq. Chief Clerk of the Royal Kitchen, was keeper of Creslow pastures. He was succeeded by Benett Mayne, a relative of the regicide, who was succeeded in 1634 by the regicide Cornelius Holland. This Cornelius Holland, whose father died insolvent in the Fleet, was 'a Poore boy in court waiting on Sir Henry Vane,' by whose interest he was appointed by Charles I keeper of Creslow pastures. He subsequently deserted the cause of his royal patron, and was rewarded by the Parliament with many lucrative posts. He entered the House of Commons in 1642, and after taking a very prominent part against the king, signed his death-warrant. He became so wealthy that, though he had ten children, he gave a daughter on her marriage £5,000, equal to ten times that sum at the present day. He is traditionally accused of having destroyed or dismantled many of the churches in the neighbourhood of Creslow, [including the churches of Creslow, Granborough and East Claydon]. At the Restoration, being absolutely excepted from the royal amnesty [(the Indemnity and Oblivion Act)], he escaped execution only by fleeing to Lausanne, where, says Noble, 'he ended his days in universal contempt.'

== See also ==
- List of regicides of Charles I
