= The Firs, Whitchurch =

Country house in Buckinghamshire, England

Coordinates: 51.8768°N 0.8331°W

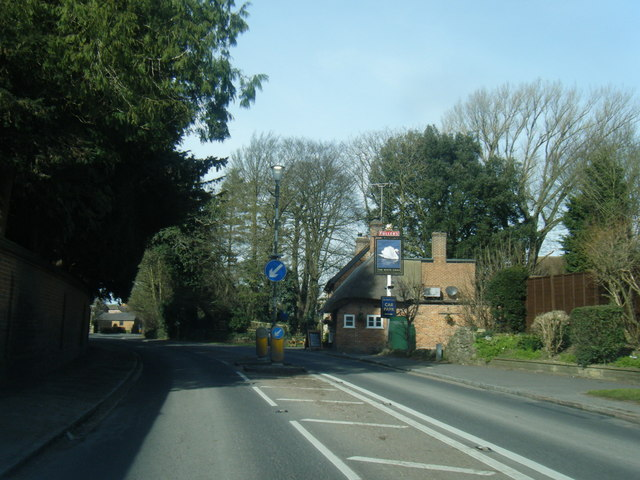
The A413 at Whitchurch in Buckinghamshire: The Firs is located behind the high stone wall on the left

The Firs is a country house in Whitchurch, Buckinghamshire.

== History ==
The house was built in 1897 for Charles Gray, an officer who fought with the Imperial Yeomanry in South Africa. By the 1930s the house was owned by Major Arthur Abrahams from whom it was requisitioned by the War Office in 1939. During the Second World War the house was used by MD1 for the development and testing of various weapons including time delay fuses, depth charges and PIAT guns. The house, which was known locally as "Winston Churchill's Toyshop", accommodated some 250 people at this time. Meanwhile Abrahams was knighted for his services to the British Red Cross in June 1942.

In around 1953 the house became the Central Research Laboratories for Richard Thomas and Baldwins, iron and steel producers. This use continued until 1967 when Richard Thomas and Baldwins was nationalised as part of British Steel. The house has since been converted into offices and in 2016 was owned by Christopher Mann, Chairman of Plenham Publishing.
