= Creslow Park =

Coordinates: 51.8880°N 0.8184°W

Creslow Park is a large specialist technical facility located in Creslow, in the Aylesbury Vale in the English county of Buckinghamshire. It was originally established in 1944 as Creslow Transmission Station, a top secret radio communications facility for Section VII (Communications) of the Secret Intelligence Service. It is believed to have been one of three remote radio sites operated by the Diplomatic Wireless Service and managed from Hanslope Park near Milton Keynes. All three of these sites were located in rural locations in Buckinghamshire, the other two being close to the villages of Gawcott and Poundon respectively.

== Building and intended purpose ==
The original buildings and aerials were erected in 1944. Little is known about these buildings, but some photographs are available. In these photographs a semi-circular transmission building believed to be of the same design as the one located at Signal Hill in Gawcott (which still exists today) can be clearly seen.

The site was completely overhauled and modernised in 1989-90 with many of the post-war buildings, including the main transmission building, being demolished and a new state-of-the-art building replacing them. The main building contains 5000sq/ft of highly secure, purpose built technical space divided into two areas, one denoted the 'Drive and Mux Room' (approx 1000sq/ft) and the other the 'Transmission Hall' (approx 4000sq/ft). The former appears to be where the signals were generated and is fully lined internally with a copper faraday cage.

Dual-redundant power was designed in to the building from the outset and a dedicated HV connection to the grid supported the historical use of the site. This combined with 2x Rolls-Royce Diesel Generators provides excellent power redundancy. In recent years diverse fibre optic communications have been installed meaning the site has an abundance of connectivity.

== Modern times ==
Documents found at the site suggest that the facility was decommissioned in 1995 and after sitting empty for several years it was sold to the local farmer upon whose land the access route resides. The site was leased to local Internet service provider Electronic Communities Ltd in late 2018 who are gradually converting the site for modern data centre use and as a central hub for their Fibre To The Home (Fiber to the x) network.

In November of 2019, a pair of IBM System 360 Model 20 were moved to Creslow Park for restoration.
