= Whitchurch, Buckinghamshire =

Village in Buckinghamshire, England

Coordinates: 51.8773°N 0.8320°W

Whitchurch
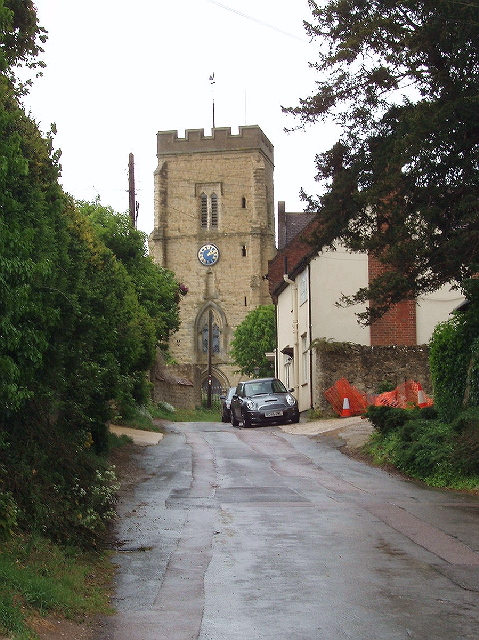
- Church Lane, with the tower of St John the Evangelist's parish church

- Location within Buckinghamshire
- Population: 932 (2011 Census including Creslow)
- OS grid reference: SP8020
- Civil parish: Whitchurch
- Unitary authority: Buckinghamshire
- Ceremonial county: Buckinghamshire
- Region: South East
- Country: England
- Sovereign state: United Kingdom
- Post town: Aylesbury
- Postcode district: HP22
- Dialling code: 01296
- Police: Thames Valley
- Fire: Buckinghamshire
- Ambulance: South Central
- UK Parliament: Aylesbury

Whitchurch is a village and civil parish in the unitary authority area of Buckinghamshire, England. The village is on the A413 road about 4 miles (6.4 km) north of Aylesbury and 4.5 miles (7 km) south of Winslow. The 2011 Census recorded a parish population of 932.

== Toponym ==
The toponym "Whitchurch" is common in England. It derived from the Old English wit chert, meaning white earth.

== Castle ==
Bolbec Castle was built in the Anarchy in the early 12th century. It was burned down by Parliamentary forces in the English Civil War. Its remains are a scheduled monument.

== Parish church ==
The oldest parts of the Church of England parish church of Saint John the Evangelist are 13th-century. They include the chancel and the Early English west doorway. The nave has aisles with four-bay arcades. The south aisle was added first, late in the 13th century. The north aisle was added slightly later, and the south door is early 14th-century. Also 14th-century are the sedilia and piscina in the chancel. The west tower was added in the middle of the 14th century, with its eastern buttresses intruding into the north and south aisles. In the 15th century a Perpendicular Gothic porch was added to the south doorway. Also Perpendicular Gothic are the nave's clerestory and roof, which are late 15th- or early 16th-century. The church is a Grade II* listed building.

The west tower has a ring of six bells. The oldest are the third and fourth bells, which were cast by an unknown bellfounder in 1619. Henry I Bagley of Chacombe, Northamptonshire cast the treble bell in 1680. The other two bells were cast in 1797, but by two different founders. John Briant of Hertford cast the second bell, but Thomas I Mears of the Whitechapel Bell Foundry cast the tenor. The church has also a Sanctus bell, which was cast in 1708 by one of the Chandler family of bellfounders of Drayton Parslow. Sir Edward Smythe (1602–1682), a retired judge who bought the manor of Whitchurch in about 1669, is buried in the church.

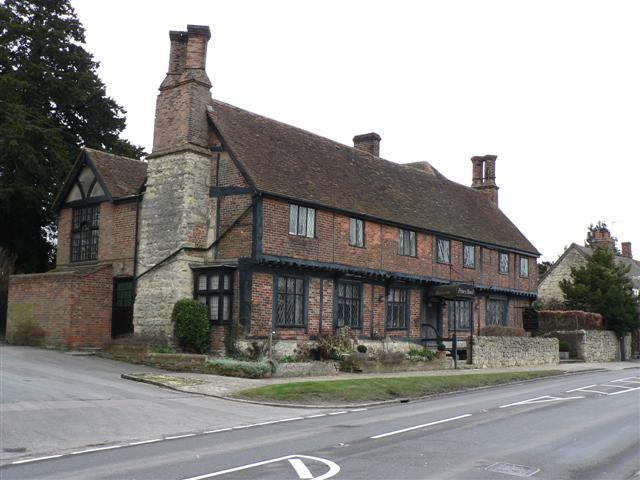
The Priory Hotel (15th and 16th century)

== Economic and social history ==
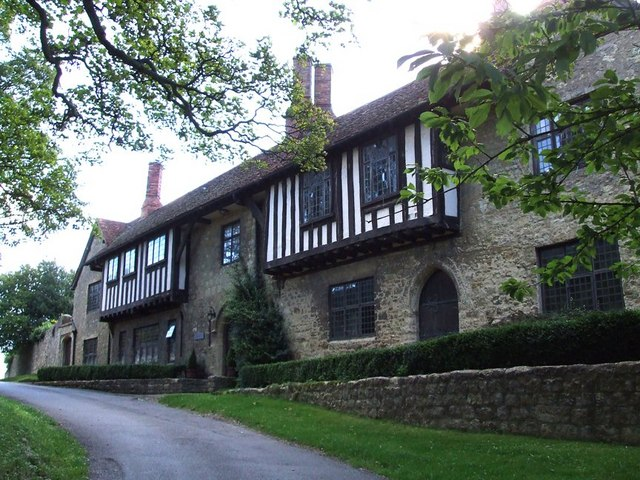
The Old House (15th, 17th and 20th centuries)

The village used to have a market, which was chartered in 1245. A street of the village is still called Market Hill, and the village still celebrates the granting of its market charter with a May feast each year.

Many of the village's cottages and houses are historic. None is a Grade I listed building but two are Grade II* Listed. The Priory in the High Street and The Old House in Church Headland Lane are 15th-century timber-framed houses, each with first-floor jettying. The Priory was altered in the 16th, 19th and 20th centuries, has brick nogging, was a hotel (and restaurant "La Boiserie") and is now a private house. The Old House was altered in the 17th century and the front was remodelled around 1940.

Nikolaus Pevsner also noted two houses in Oving Road: School House, which is 16th-century, timber-framed and has a jettied first floor; and Whitchurch House, which is early 17th-century and has an early 18th-century façade.

Rex Whistler's painting The Vale of Aylesbury was created in Whitchurch, where a house is now named after him.

The Firs was used as a facility for developing weapons during the Second World War.

Creslow Transmission Station, now known as Creslow Park located within the parish was a radio transmission station operated by Section VII (Communications) of the Secret Intelligence Service from approximately 1944 to 1990.

== Amenities ==
As well as the Priory Hotel (see above) the village now has one public house: The White Swan, at the end of the high street nearest Aylesbury.

Whitchurch Combined School is a community primary school for boys and girls aged 4–11. The school has about 200 pupils. Its catchment area includes the parishes of Whitchurch, Hardwick, Oving, Pitchcott and Weedon. It also includes part of Watermead and the Berryfields and Weedon Hill Major Development Areas (MDAs) in Aylesbury, although new schools are planned for the MDAs.

== Notable residents ==
- Steve Rothery, musician with Marillion; lives in Whitchurch
- Sir Edward Smythe (1602–1682), former Chief Justice of the Irish Common Pleas; retired to Whitchurch and is buried in St John the Evangelist
- Jan Struther, novelist notable for Mrs Miniver; lived at Whitchurch House. Her ashes were buried at Whitchurch beside her father

== Sources and further reading ==
- Page, W.H., ed. (1925). "Whitchurch". A History of the County of Buckingham, Volume 3. Victoria County History. pp. 442–449.
- Pevsner, Nikolaus (1960). Buckinghamshire. The Buildings of England. Harmondsworth: Penguin Books. pp. 292–293. ISBN 0-14-071019-1.
