= Big Joe 5 crossbow =

Design of crossbow

The Big Joe 5 crossbow (BJ5) was a shoulder-fired weapon developed by the Office of Strategic Services (OSS) (predecessor to Central Intelligence Agency) to be used for assassinations up to 200 m (220 yd). The weapon was created with compactness in mind. It is described in John Brunner's book OSS Weapons. Its ammunition consisted of 8 oz (230 g) aluminum darts or incendiary flare bolts.

Unlike most crossbows, the Big Joe 5 used a rigid triangular frame to suspend an array of elastic rubber bands, which provided the energy storage and propulsive mechanism for the bolts. The body of the weapon was roughly the size of a large handgun and it featured a hinged stock of heavy steel wire that doubled as a cocking lever. For transport and concealment the frame and stock could be folded, resulting in a very compact package.
