= Welbike =

British folding motorcycle

Excelsior Welbike
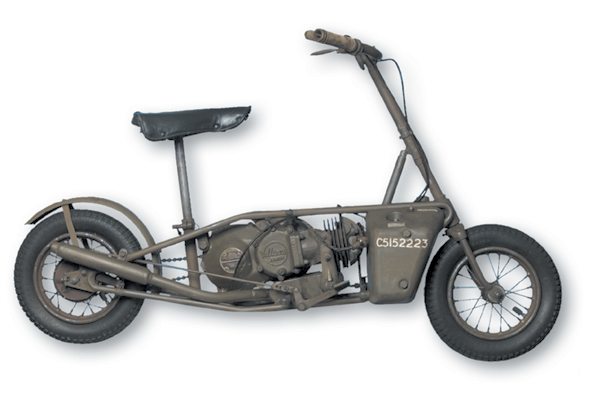
- Manufacturer: Excelsior Motor Company of Birmingham
- Production: 1942–1945
- Successor: Corgi 50
- Engine: 98 cc (6.0 cu in), two-stroke, air cooled, single
- Transmission: Single-speed
- Suspension: None
- Weight: 32 kg (71 lb) (dry)
- Fuel capacity: 3.7 litres (0.81 imp gal; 0.98 US gal)

The Welbike is a British single-seat folding motorcycle produced during World War II at the direction of Station IX — the "Inter Services Research Bureau" — based at Welwyn, UK, for use by Special Operations Executive (SOE). It has the distinction of being the smallest motorcycle ever used by the British Armed Forces. Between 1942 and 1943, 3,641 units (plus a prototype and some pilot models) were built and, although not much used by the SOE, some were issued to the British 1st and 6th Airborne Divisions and some were used at Arnhem during Operation Market Garden.

The Italians, Germans and Americans also developed small motorcycles for their airborne forces during World War II.

== Development ==
The original prototype was designed by SOE motor cycle enthusiast Harry Lester, from an idea developed by Lt. Colonel John Dolphin, the Commanding Officer of Station IX, the secret Inter-Services Military Research Establishment based in a mansion called The Frythe (latterly owned by the pharmaceutical company GSK) an hour's drive north of London near the village of Welwyn in Hertfordshire, which had been taken over for the war effort. Powered by a Villiers 98 cm^{3} (6.0 cu in) single-cylinder two-stroke petrol (gasoline) engine, the Welbike was designed to fit into a CLE Canister – a standard parachute airdrop container 51 inches (130 cm) long, 15 inches (38 cm) high, and 12 inches (30 cm) wide. Once deployed, they were easily assembled and ready for use as quickly as possible. The name Welbike comes from the custom that all the clandestine equipment devised at Station IX in Welwyn had names starting with Wel, e.g., Welman, Welrod. There was very limited space in the airborne equipment container, so the Welbike, which was carried in the container at an angle, had no suspension, no lights and just a single rear brake.

The fuel tank was as small as possible and, because its bottom feed point was located lower than the carburetor, had to be pressurised occasionally by a hand pump built into the tank. The range on maximum capacity of 6.5 imperial pints (3.7 L; 7.8 US pt) of fuel was 90 miles (140 km) at about 30 mph (48 km/h). Tanks were pressurised before the Welbike went into action to save time. The Welbike was then packed into the parachute container with the rear wheel to the base of the parachute canister, which had a percussion head to minimise damage on landing. Once it hit the ground all that was needed was to twist the handlebars into position and lock them on spring-loaded pins. The saddle was pulled up and the footrests folded out ready to push start the two stroke engine and ride into action. The aim was that a paratrooper could remove the Welbike from its special green container (which was marked in white lettering with the words Motor Cycle) and its easily identified coloured parachute, and be on the road within 11 seconds. The prototype survived extensive drop testing at the Special Operations School at Arisaig in Scotland where it was demonstrated to the commando forces.

The prototype was then sent to Excelsior Ltd for further development. A number of pre-production "pilot" machines were built for further testing and experimental modifications at the Airborne Forces Experimental Establishment at RAF Sherburn-in-Elmet near Leeds in September 1942, including dropping them from aircraft to land by parachute. The Villiers engine was found to be seriously underpowered when ridden by a fully equipped soldier, so it was retuned to improve the power output.

The simple design of the Welbike meant that it was easy and quick to produce and from 1942 went into full production for issue to airborne forces. By 1943 it was also being widely used by ground assault forces, including the Commandos and the Royal Marines Commando units, particularly for beach landings at Anzio and Normandy. The small size of the Welbike meant that it also proved very useful as a general airfield transport by the Royal Air Force and aircrews based in the large Far East airfields would "stow away" a Welbike if they could find one.

There were three production versions of the Welbike. The first 1,200 were known as the Mark 1 and were a developed version of the original prototype with tuned engines and did not have a rear mudguard. 1,400 Mark 2 Series 1 Welbikes were produced which had a range of minor modifications, including the addition of the rear mudguard. The final batch of 1,340 was the Mark 2 Series 2 and had "saddle" fuel tanks with a splash shielding between them, and an improved filler cap replacing the original design which required the removal of the pressurisation pump which was found to be too time-consuming.

In combat situations the Welbike could prove a liability as paratroops needed to get under cover as quickly as possible and had to find the Welbike containers before they could start to assemble them. The difference in weight between a parachutist and a container meant that they often landed some distance apart, rather defeating the purpose, and some were captured by enemy forces or lost before they could even be used. The low power and small wheels also meant that they struggled to cope adequately with the often rough battlefield roads so were often abandoned by troops who found it easier to continue on foot. Another problem for the Welbike was that, by the time it was in mass production, much larger gliders had been developed that could carry bigger and more powerful motorcycles such as the Royal Enfield WD/RE.

== Production ==
Welbike Production Contracts
Contract	Date	Quantity	Amended Quantity	Frame Numbers	WD Numbers	Received	Model
Prototype	N/A	1	N/A	1	N/A	N/A	Prototype
Pilot	N/A	12	N/A	2 - 13	N/A	N/A	Pilot
294/23/S.789	26 August 1942	1,000	Increased to 1,200	14 - 1214	C4658444 - C4659673	15 October 1942	Mk 1
294/23/S.1649	19 November 1942	1,400	N/A	1214 - 2613	C5152014 - C51534133	February to 14 March 1943	Mk 2, Series 1
294/23/S.1946	27 December 1942	1,341	reduced to 1,241	2614 - 3954	C5153414 - C5154654	Unknown	Mk 2, Series 2
294/23/S.3662	21 June 1943	7,778	reduced to 1,241 then cancelled	3955 - 5195	C5367454 - C536869	N/A	N/A

The Prototype and Pilot models are distinguished by teardrop-shaped saddle tanks. At least two of these early Welbikes have been saved (number 2 and one other). It appears that only the Mark II Welbikes had a contract number dataplate. This was brass and was attached to the frame below the seat post.

== Corgi scooter ==
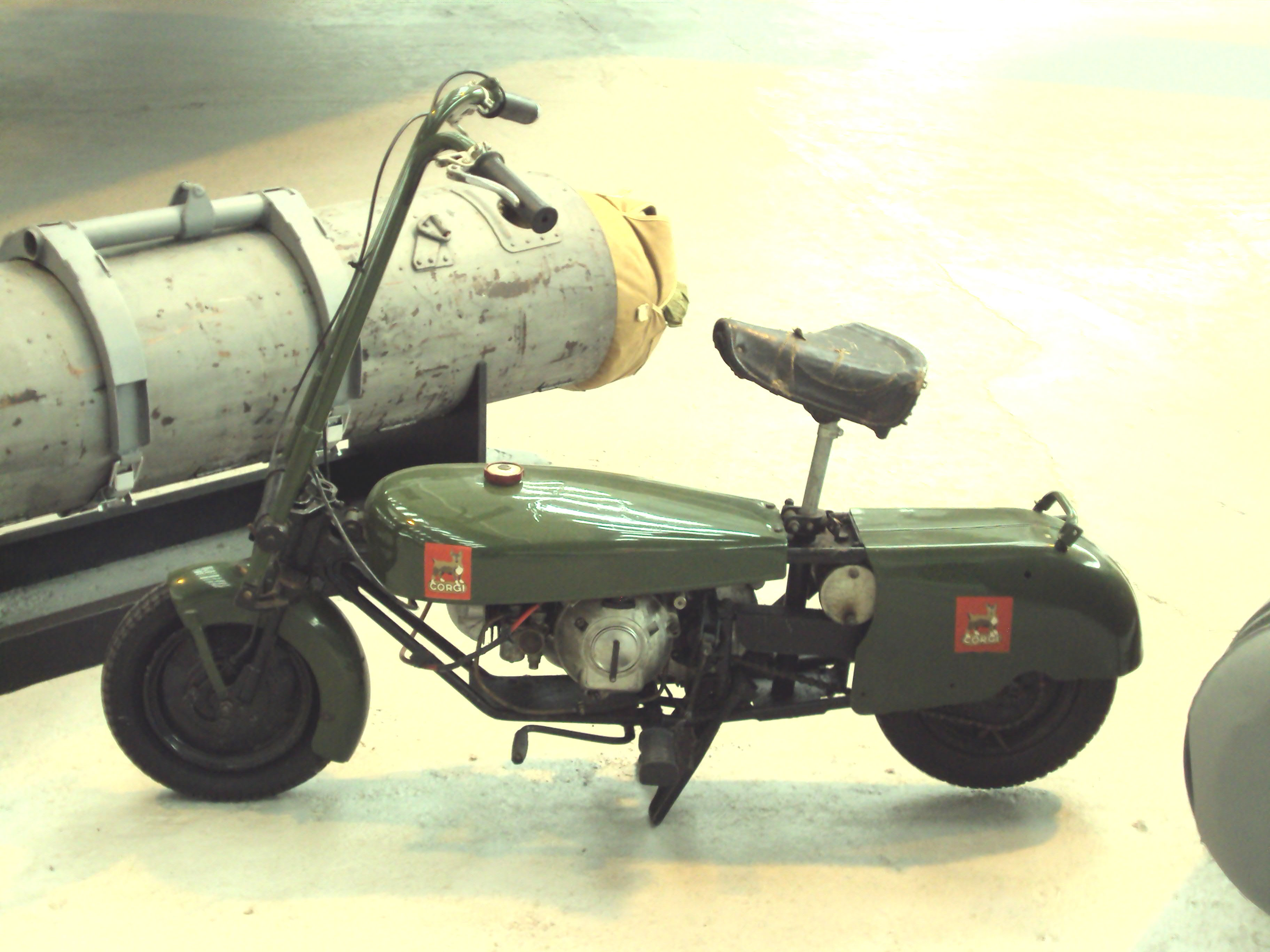
A Corgi scooter and a CLE Canister, displayed at the Royal Air Force Museum Cosford (2010)

Many of the later models never saw action and were disposed of at the end of the war, mostly exported to the U.S. where they were sold by a New York department store. The lack of a front brake meant that they could not legally be used on the road, so most were bought by farmers for off-road use. The originator John Dolphin developed his ideas further and set up the Corgi Motorcycle Co Ltd. of which he was managing director, and had them produced as the Corgi by Brockhouse Engineering (Southport) Ltd., who had been manufacturing military trailers during the war. The Corgi scooter was powered by an Excelsior Spryt Autocycle engine and went into production in 1947. Most were initially exported to North America branded as the "Indian Papoose" and not sold in the UK until early 1948, with some 27,050 being manufactured. The single-speed two-stroke engine proved too slow, and despite the high post war demand for transport, lack of power and reliability problems meant it was discontinued in October 1954.

Corgi scooters were sometimes painted a military green but were not much used by the British armed forces. A few were used by the Royal Navy. The concept continued to be developed by other manufacturers and led to the folding Honda Monkey bike of the 1960s.

== Survivors ==
There are surviving Welbikes in countries around the world including the UK, US (where many were sold surplus after World War II) Canada, Australia, South Africa, India, the Netherlands, France and Belgium. Welbikes are quite rare and very few survive with the original War Department number intact as it was painted on. Many restorations have added a typical or estimated War Department number when the original was missing. The only permanent identity of a Welbike is the frame serial number which is stamped on the front of the frame, above the fork.

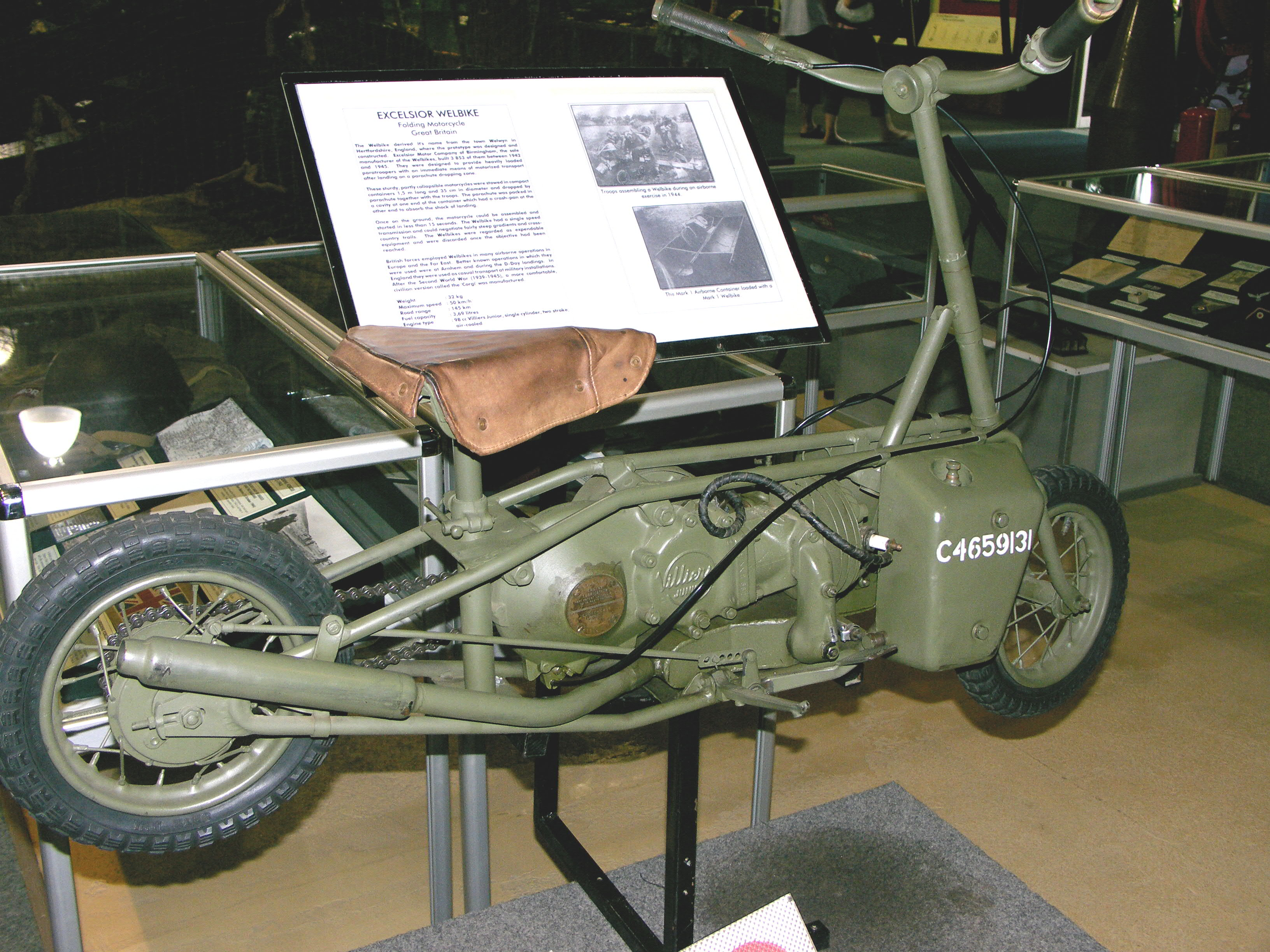
C4659131 at the South African National Museum of Military History

Examples include:

- RAF Harrington Aviation Museum, Harrington, Northampton, UK: WD Number C5152111
- South African National Museum of Military History, Johannesburg, South Africa: WD Number C4659131
- Imperial War Museum
- Musée de l'Armée
- National Motor Museum, Beaulieu
- Australian War Memorial in Canberra ACT.
- Australian Army Museum Bandiana at Gaza Ridge Barracks, Victoria, Australia.

Two of the Prototype/Pilot models have been preserved: Serial number 2 found in Oregon, restored and sold to a collector in the Netherlands, and another with an unknown number in the UK.

Colin MacGregor Stevens' (MVPA Member 954 since 1977) private collection in Richmond, British Columbia, Canada, had three complete Welbikes Mark II: Frame Serial number 1253; Frame Serial number 3839, found in original condition in Ohio, USA; and Frame Serial number 2348, found in Australia, apparently one of the 302 Welbikes boxed for export and delivered on 16 March 1943.

Some Mk. II Welbikes had a contract dataplate on the frame, below the seat.

== Legacy ==
The Welbike's folding motorcycle design inspired the Japanese-made Honda Motocompo folding motorcycle that fit into 1st generation Honda City in 1981.

== See also ==
- List of motorcycles of the 1940s
- List of motorcycles of the 1950s
