= Welfreighter =

British midget submarine of the Second World War

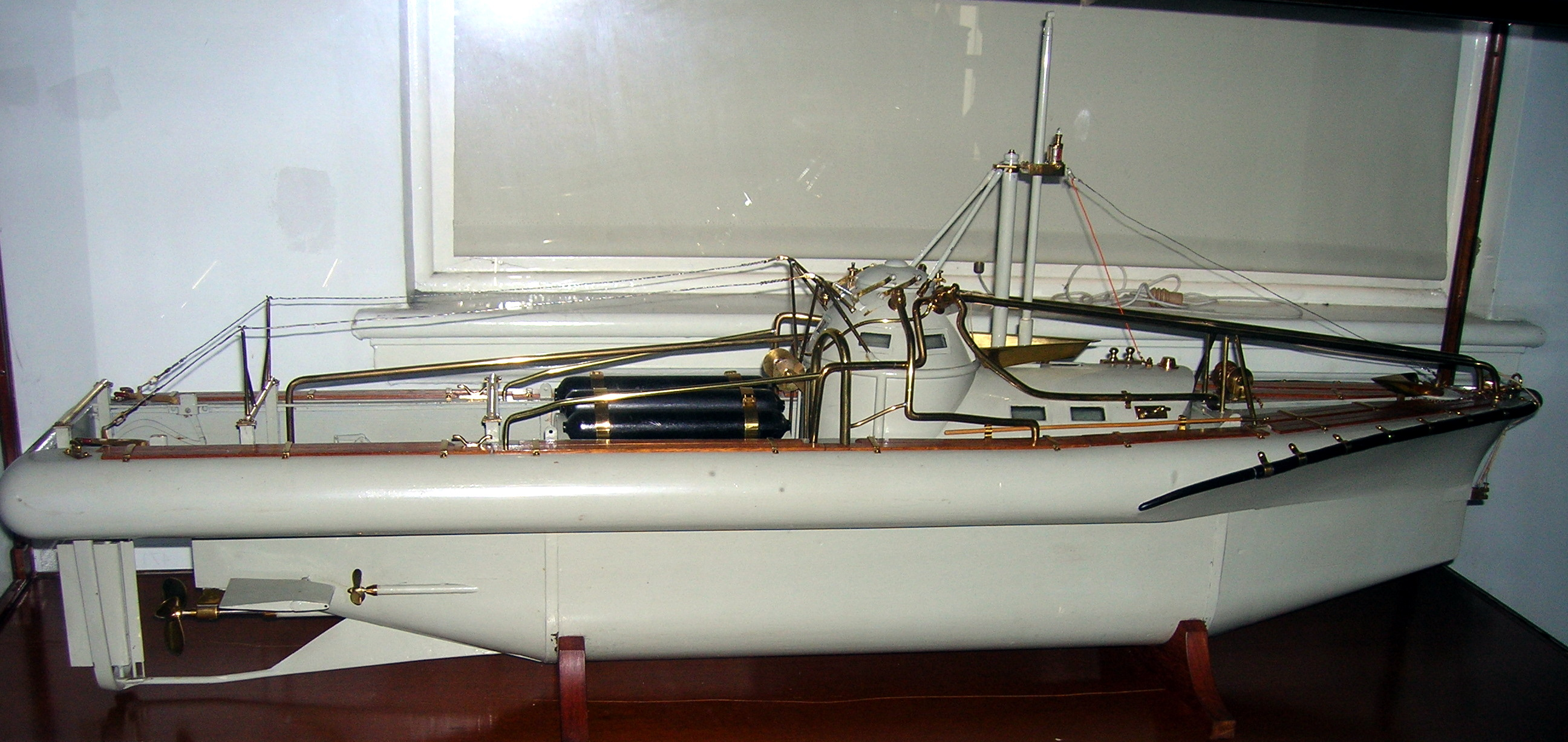
- Model of a Welfreighter mark III, about 1944. National Maritime Museum, London.

Class overview
- Name: Welfreighter
- Operators: SOE United Kingdom
- Completed: 100+

General characteristics Welfreighter
- Type: midget submarine
- Length: 37 ft (11 m)
- Propulsion: Surfaced: Gardner 4LW 44 hp bus engine; Submerged: 2 x 2 hp electric motors
- Speed: 5.5 knots (10.2 km/h) cruising speed; 7 knots (13 km/h) maximum.
- Range: 1,000 mi (1,600 km)
- Test depth: 130 ft (40 m)
- Crew: 2

The Welfreighter was a Second World War British midget submarine developed by the Special Operations Executive (SOE) for the purpose of landing and supplying agents behind enemy lines. It only saw action once and was not particularly successful. No Welfreighters are known to have survived.

== Design ==
After the success of the X class midget submarines, an attempt was made by SOE's technical division, Inter Services Research Bureau (ISRB) under the command of Lt. Colonel John Dolphin to design a submersible craft for covert missions. These would include the landing and supplying agents behind enemy lines, intelligence gathering work off hostile coastlines, and delivering explosive depth charges to enemy shipping routes. This design became the Welfreighter. It was intended that the Welfreighter could travel surfaced by night towards an enemy-held coastline, submerging as and when necessary to avoid detection. The special agents would then be disembarked and go ashore along with their equipment, stored in the special containers. The Welfreighter would then sail out to sea and submerge itself to wait until the next night. At a pre-arranged time, or upon receiving a sound signal from the landing party (made by a mechanical device) it would surface again and pick up the agents, before heading out to sea either to rendezvous with a larger surface vessel or return to base under its own power.

The initial concept was a true miniature submarine which could from a distance be mistaken for a conventional motor boat and which could hold two agents along with its crew of two men, and which could also carry up to one ton of supplies in sealed containers. The designed range was to be up to 600 miles (970 km) on the surface, with a range of 200 miles (320 km) at speeds of up to 8 knots (15 km/h). While submerged it was to be capable of diving to a depth of 130 feet (40 m) and travelling up to 40 miles (64 km) underwater.

Design work began towards the end of 1942 with the building of a 1/4 scale model which was used for tests in an experimental tank at Vickers' plant at St. Albans. By February 1943 the tests had produced several alterations to the original design including modifications to the hull form to make it stable under tow at speeds of 10 knots (19 km/h) - 15 knots (28 km/h).

=== Prototypes ===
Following the model tests, permission was granted for the construction of a full size prototype at the SOE establishment known as The Frythe in Welwyn.

The first prototype had little resemblance to the later versions. When launched at Staines in May 1943 it permitted further tests but showed flaws in that it was not stable under tow at speeds over 7 knots (13 km/h) and lacked freeboard. A second prototype was begun in June and was tested throughout the autumn and winter.

A third prototype was begun in September 1943. Its surface range - 1,000 miles (1,600 km) - exceeded the specification, but at the expense of reducing the storage capacity by 240 pounds (110 kg). Its speed was less than the specification, at 6 knots (11 km/h) maximum while surfaced, with a mere 2 knots (3.7 km/h) submerged. It did however perform satisfactorily when pressure tested to a depth of 130 feet (40 m).

== Production ==
In early 1944 a specification for a final Mk III version was proposed by SOE, which eventually entered series production. The range was now specified as 1,000 miles (1,600 km), with an additional 1,000 miles (1,600 km) using disposable tanks (which however meant a loss of the diving capability). A further 600 miles (970 km) could be added if part of the storage capacity was used. The accommodation had also been enlarged; as well as the two crewmen, 4 passengers could be carried on short voyages, or 3 for longer trips. The cargo capacity had also been enhanced to enable between 1.5 and 2 tons to be carried.

Underwater endurance had also been augmented, the craft now being capable of supporting 6 persons for up to 40 hours submerged. Finally, surface speed had been increased to 5.5 knots (10.2 km/h) cruising speed, or 7 knots (13 km/h) maximum. Even the electric propulsion was upgraded: it could deliver 2-3 knots. By now it was apparent that it was unlikely that the Welfreighter would be needed in Europe, therefore consideration was given to its use in the Far East.

Due to the urgency of production it was not possible to create a dedicated factory. As had happened with the Welman submarine the year before, production was contracted out to specialised engineering firms already engaged in production of war material. In mid-1944, the Letchworth company of Shelvoke and Drewry Ltd. was awarded a contract to produce Welfreighters. By early September an order for up to 34 Welfreighters was placed for delivery as soon as possible after 1 October. The company had no experience of ship construction, and was 75 miles (121 km) from the sea. Security surrounding the production of the Welfreighter was tight, and few non-vetted employees knew the truth until after the end of the war.

Completed craft were transported at night under canvas covers to Station IX at Welwyn, where they were fitted out, the compass and periscope and secret equipment fitted. The craft were then balanced, trimmed, and pressure tested in the establishment's water tank. They were then transported onwards to Fishguard in Wales, for sea trials.

== Appearance ==
The Welfreighter outwardly resembled a conventional 37 feet (11 m) motor boat. While surfaced it was propelled by a Gardner 4LW 44 hp (33 kW) diesel omnibus engine driving a 4-bladed propeller, while underwater propulsion was provided by two 2 hp (1.5 kW) electric motors, driving a pair of small propellers. Two "masts" on the craft's foredeck housed a Barr and Stroud periscope and a magnetic compass. A dummy mast and sail could be attached to these masts to help disguise the craft as a fishing smack. The foredeck was raised up to give some headroom inside the craft, and was fitted with small square viewports.

To the rear of the main structure was a raised deck, beneath which were housed 6 high pressure air cylinders. To the rear of this area was a cargo well, fitted at the stern with a drop-down tailgate. This could house seven cylindrical drums of cargo. Carefully loaded so as to give a slight positive buoyancy, these drums could hold equipment for use by agents or saboteurs and could be floated out through the tailgate and towed ashore by agents, either swimming or using an inflatable boat.

Each Welfreighter was manned by a Sub Lieutenant RNVR as Commander, and a Naval Engine Room Artificer (ERA) or Army mechanic (REME). Up to four special agents could travel as passengers, although two would be more usual. These would commonly be Army personnel, who would be expected to assist with handling the craft while on the surface.

== Service ==
=== Europe ===
Before the Welfreighter became properly operational the secret war in Europe was nearly over. In late 1944 plans were discussed to deploy the craft to the Adriatic, to assist operations in the Balkans, where SOE was involved in supporting partisans in northern Greece, Albania, and Yugoslavia.

It was also suggested that Welfreighters could be used to plant mines in the entrances to German ports, but this was dropped when it was demonstrated that a suitable charge would have to weigh over 224 pounds (102 kg), which would be too much for the craft's buoyancy and trim.

Trained Welfreighter crews were ready for operations through the autumn of 1944, but neither Combined Operations HQ or SOE ever required anything of them.

=== Far East ===
Two Welfreighters were shipped to Fremantle, Australia, in late 1944, to become part of the clandestine Services Reconnaissance Department (commonly known as Z Special Unit). Extensive trials were conducted, including towing trials and exercises using high-powered motor launches and Motor Torpedo Boats. One source suggests that 12 were sent to Australia in 1945.
