= Wiltshire (disambiguation) =

Wiltshire is a county in south-west England.

Wiltshire may also refer to:

== Places ==
- Wiltshire (district), a district of Wiltshire, England, covered by Wiltshire Council
- Wiltshire (European Parliament constituency)
- Wiltshire, Tasmania, a locality in north-west Tasmania, Australia
- Wiltshire (UK Parliament constituency)

== People with the surname ==
- Bob Wiltshire (1932–2015), Australian rules footballer
- Graham Wiltshire (1931–2017), English cricketer
- Kelly Wiltshire (born 1972), Canadian linebacker
- Patricia Wiltshire, British forensic ecologist, botanist and palynologist
- Ray Wiltshire (1913–1990), Australian politician
- Sarah Wiltshire, British footballer
- Samuel Paul Wiltshire (1891–1967), English mycologist and phytopathologist
- Stephen Wiltshire, British architectural artist and autistic savant

== See also ==
- Wilshire (disambiguation)
- Wilshere
- Willshire (disambiguation)
