= Wilshire =

Wilshire, an archaic spelling of the English county Wiltshire, may refer to:

== People ==
- Wilshire (surname)

== Places ==
- Beaumont-Wilshire, Portland, Oregon, a neighborhood in that city
- Stonybrook-Wilshire, Pennsylvania, a community in that state
- Mid-Wilshire, a neighborhood in Central Los Angeles
- Wilshire Boulevard, a street in Los Angeles County
- Wilshire Park, Los Angeles, a district in that city

== Buildings and commercial centers ==
- Bullocks Wilshire, a notable building in Los Angeles, California
- The Regent Beverly Wilshire Hotel, in Beverly Hills, California
- Wilshire Center, Los Angeles, California
- Wilshire Theater, Beverly Hills, California
- Wilshire Grand Center, skyscraper in Los Angeles, California

== Heavy-rail stations ==
- Wilshire/Normandie, Los Angeles County Metro Rail station
- Wilshire/Vermont, Los Angeles County Metro Rail station
- Wilshire/Western, Los Angeles County Metro Rail station

== Miscellaneous ==
- LAPD Wilshire Division, a division of the Los Angeles Police Department
- Wilshire 4500, stock index
- Wilshire 5000, stock index
- Wilshire Associates, a global investment firm
- Epiphone Wilshire, an electric guitar originally manufactured by Epiphone in the 1960s
- "Wilshire", the penultimate track on Tyler, the Creator's 2021 album Call Me If You Get Lost

== See also ==
- Wilshere, a surname
- Willshire (disambiguation)
- Wiltshire (disambiguation)
