= Station IX =

British military equipment factory

Coordinates: 51°49′12″N 0°13′24″W

Station IX (formerly known as the Inter-Services Research Bureau) was a secret British Special Operations Executive factory making special weapons and equipment during World War II.

The small Welbike paratrooper's motorcycle and the Welrod assassination weapon were both products of the station.

== Overview ==
Station IX was responsible for the development and production of weapons for the SOE, which supported agents and cells of resistance throughout occupied Europe. It was one of several similar workshops and laboratories throughout England. Under its commanding officer Lt. Colonel John Dolphin, and Chief of Scientific Research, Professor D.M. Newitt, secret research included military vehicles and equipment, explosives and technical sabotage, camouflage, biological and chemical warfare.

It was situated at a mansion called "The Frythe" about an hour's drive north from London near the village of Welwyn. This had been an exclusive hotel but was commandeered in August 1939 by the British Directorate of Military Intelligence. In the grounds, small cabins and barracks functioned as laboratories and workshops. Heavily guarded, the personnel included civilian scientists and craftsmen, (who like Dolphin received "war service" military rank) and military personnel from all three services, who all wore their own regimental badges and uniform.

== Inventions ==
All machines developed for the SOE by Station IX at Welwyn were given prefix "Wel-". Dolphin was responsible for the Welbike and Welman submarine and led the development of the Welfreighter. One of the most productive and creative engineers attached to Station IX was Major H. Q. A. Reeves who invented both the Welrod and the Sleevegun. He was also, among others, behind the silencer for the Sten gun, fluorescent night sights, the Welgun and the Welbum. This was made clear in a document that was produced at the end of the war to ensure that the correct people were credited for their inventions.

- Welrod – a simplified pistol with a built-in silencer, designed as an assassination weapon for use by irregular forces and resistance groups.
- Welwand sleeve gun - a device attached to the forearm concealing a small firearm under a long-sleeved coat or jacket.
- Welgun – a basic submachine gun designed to be simple and cost-effective
- Normgun – the predecessor of the Welgun, rejected as being too expensive for mass-production
- Welbike – a small single-seat motorcycle designed to be air-dropped for use by paratroops
- Motorised Submersible Canoe - an open submersible enabling a single frogman to carry out clandestine reconnaissance or sabotage missions
- Welman submarine – a one-man British midget submarine designed for attacks against enemy vessels.
- Welfreighter - a midget submarine developed for the purpose of landing and supplying agents behind enemy lines.
- Welbum - a device to provide motive power for parachutists who were dropped into water. It consisted of a streamlined metal container with an electric motor and battery inside which was harnessed to the back of the swimmer. Driven by a screw, it would travel silently for 2 miles at 2 knots.

== See also ==
- Directorate of Miscellaneous Weapons Development
- MD1
