= Wilshere =

Wilshere is an English surname. Notable people with the surname include:

- Barbara Wilshere (born 1959), British actress
- Charles Wilshere (1814–1906), English landowner and collector
- Jack Wilshere (born 1992), English former footballer
- Joan Wilshere, married name Joan Koudelka (born 1948), South African tennis player
- John Wilshere, Papua New Guinean professional rugby league footballer
- R S Wilshere, Northern Irish architect
- Whitey Wilshere, Major League Baseball pitcher (1912–1985)
- William Wilshere (lawyer) (1754–1824), English banker
- William Wilshere, British politician (1806–1867), nephew of William Wilshere (1754–1824)

== See also ==
- Wilshire (surname)
