= Welrod =

Covert pistol

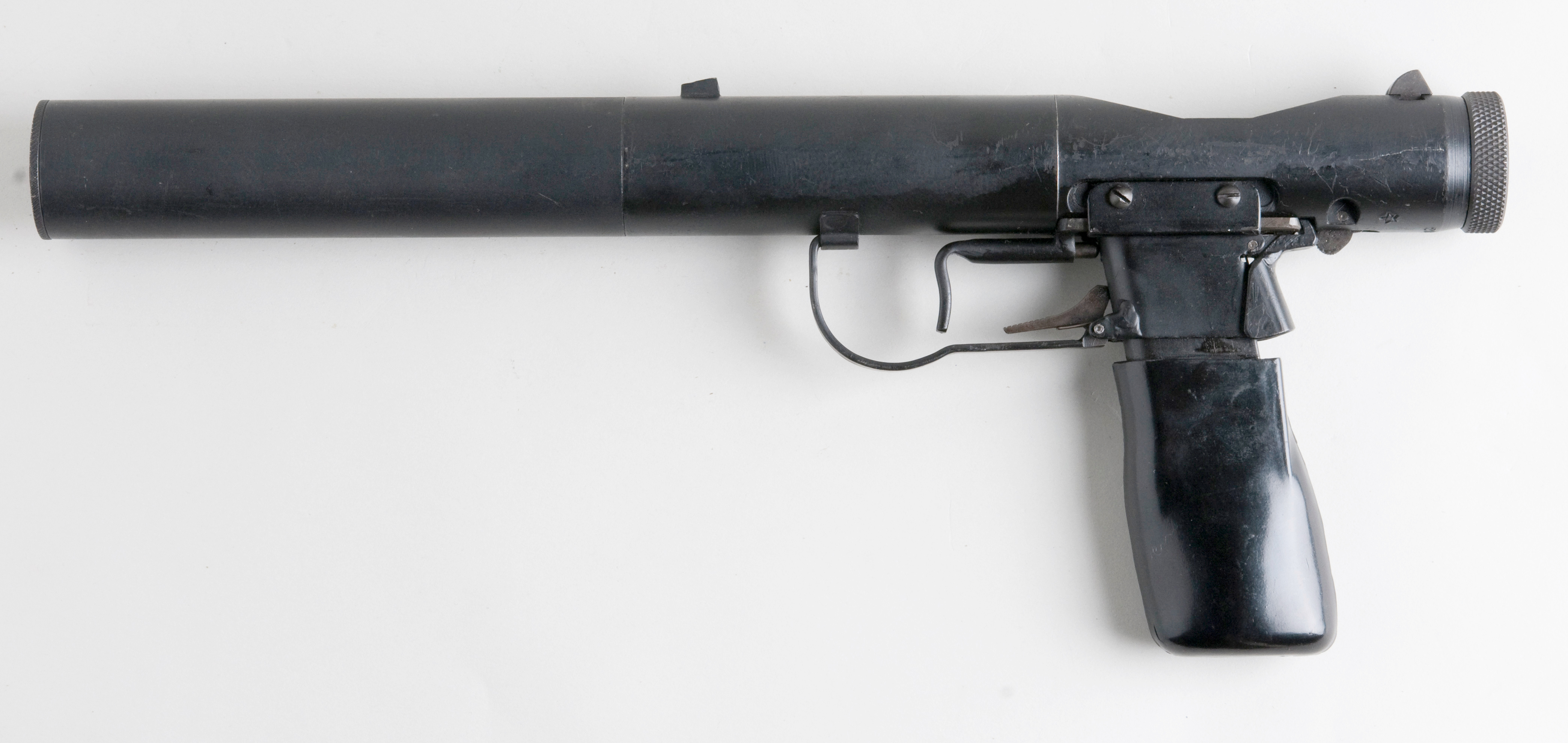
- Welrod 9mm Mk I
- Type: Integrally suppressed pistol
- Place of origin: United Kingdom

Service history
- Wars: World War II, Vietnam War, Falklands War, Desert Storm (Conjecture)

Production history
- Designer: Inter-Services Research Bureau
- Designed: 1942
- Manufacturer: BSA; unnamed other manufacturers
- Produced: World War II and onwards
- No. built: around 14,000
- Variants: Welrod Mk I (Prototype), Welrod Mk II / IIA (.32 ACP) Welrod Mk I (9mm)

Specifications
- Barrel length: 3.25 in (83 mm)
- Calibre: .32 ACP (Mk I, II/IIA) / 9×19mm Parabellum (9mm Mk I)
- Action: Bolt action
- Effective firing range: 25 yd (23 m) (Day); 7–8 yd (6.4–7.3 m) (Night)
- Feed system: 6-round (9x19 Parabellum); 8-round (.32 ACP)

The Welrod is a British bolt-action, magazine-fed pistol with an integrated suppressor that was devised for covert operations during the Second World War by Major Hugh Reeves at the Inter-Services Research Bureau (later Station IX).

Station IX was based in Welwyn, and gave the Welrod its unusual name. It is derived from "Wel" from "Welwyn" (a prefix used by covert equipment designed by Station IX) and "rod", gangland slang for gun, as a way to obscure its purpose.

The Welrod is designed for use by irregular forces and resistance groups, and is an extremely quiet gun due to its integrated silencer. Approximately 2,800 were made in wartime and perhaps 14,000 in total when post-war examples are included.

== Development ==
The name Welrod comes from the custom of naming all clandestine equipment devised at Station IX in Welwyn starting with Wel, such as the Welgun, Welbike and Welman. A document produced toward the end of the war ensured that the right people were properly credited for their inventions at Station IX. This document identifies Major Hugh Reeves as the inventor of the Welrod. He was also responsible for other important designs, including the sleeve gun, which was similar to the Welrod, though single shot and made to be concealed up a sleeve.

The Welrod was used primarily by the British Special Operations Executive (SOE) but was also used by the American Office of Strategic Services (OSS) and Resistance forces.

The Welrod is a "sanitised" weapon, meaning that it has no markings indicating its manufacturer or country of origin; it is marked only with a serial number and some inscrutable symbols and letters. The Birmingham Small Arms Company Limited (BSA) confirmed that it manufactured some Welrod pistols but put no markings at all on them, so it is likely that any markings were added by the British military after delivery.

The original Mk.I Welrod is of a bolt-action design. Though 500 were ordered, it is not clear if it ever got beyond the prototype stage, but at least one prototype is known to have survived. The Welrod Mk II, chambered for .32 ACP is the primary model. Due to poor field results, the Welrod 9mm Mk I was subsequently developed using 9×19mm Parabellum rounds.

The Southwest Pump Company produced a version of the pistol for the US government known as the Hand Firing Mechanism Mk. I based on the Welrod Mk IIA.

== Design ==
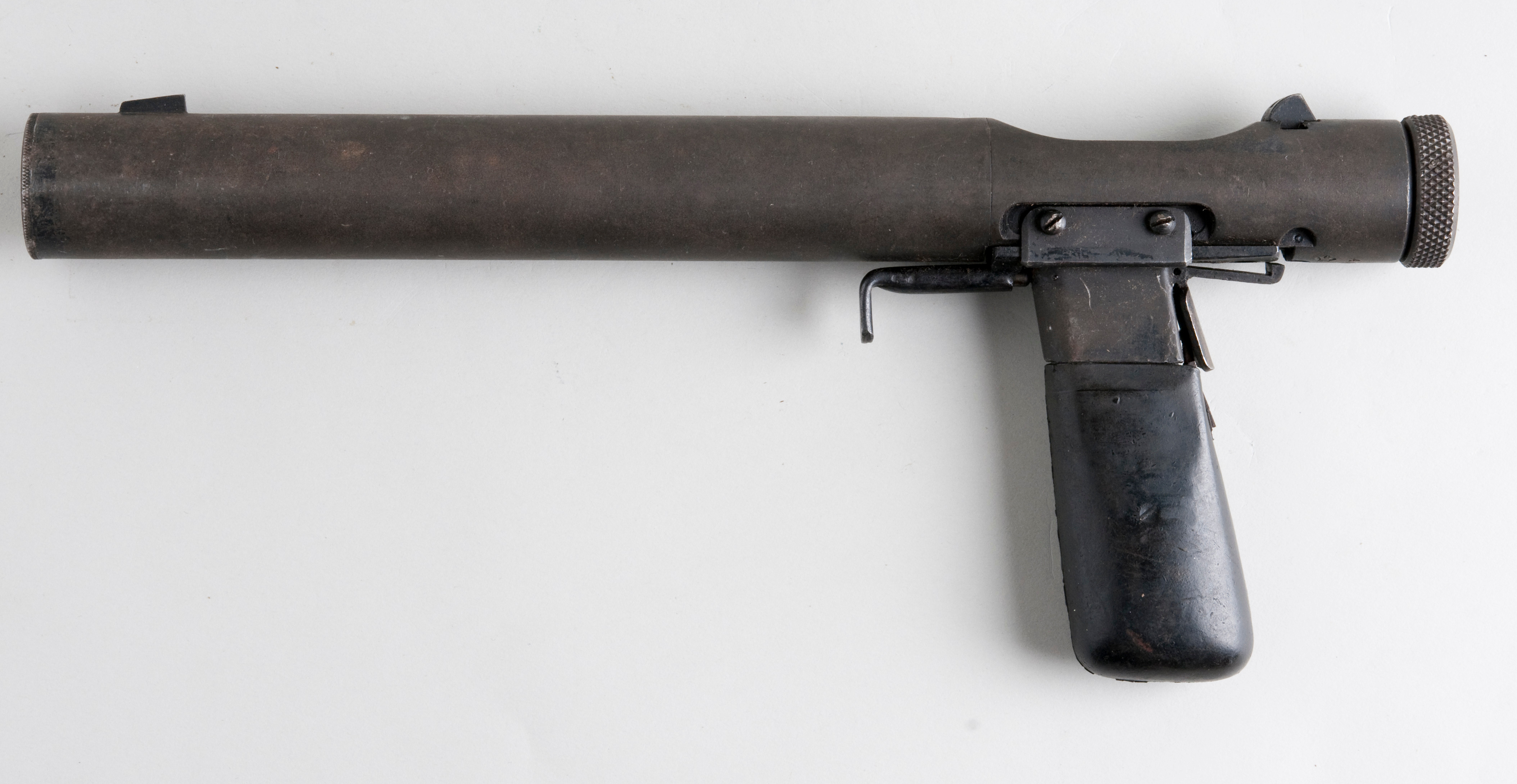
Welrod Mk IIA

The Welrod takes the form of a 1.25-inch-diameter (32 mm) cylinder, about 12 in (300 mm) long. The rear section of the cylinder contains the bolt, the middle section, the vented (16–20 ports) barrel and expansion chamber for the barrel and the front section, the baffles and (rubber) wipes of the silencer. There is a knurled knob at the rear that serves as the bolt handle, which unlocks when rotated 90 degrees. The magazine doubles as the grip and can be removed for ease of hiding. The exclusion of a pistol grip was apparently done to help conceal the weapon's purpose and in some groups it was called a "bicycle pump" due to its innocuous look with the magazine/grip removed.

The Welrod is provided with sights marked with luminescent paint for use in low-light conditions. The Mk I manual states: "It is accurate up to 30 yd (27 m) in daylight or 20 yd (18 m) on a fairly light night but is most effective when fired in contact with the target". The muzzle end of the gun is ground slightly concave to minimise noise during a contact shot; this may have also improved grip against the target, decreasing the chance of missing.

The ported barrel of the Welrod serves two purposes; it releases the powder gases gradually into the rear of the silencer, reducing the sound of firing, and it reduces the velocity of the bullet to subsonic speeds. This is especially important in the 9 mm version because the standard 9 mm loading is supersonic. The metal baffles and rubber wipes that follow the barrel serve to further slow the gases of firing, releasing them over a longer period of time and avoiding the sharp explosion that occurs when high pressure powder gases are suddenly released to the atmosphere.

The Welrod uses a bolt-action design because it is simple, reliable, and quiet. The bolt-action has only the noise of the firing pin hitting the primer, and the bolt can be cycled quietly. Magazines of six and eight rounds were produced.

== Operation ==
The pistol is manually operated using a rotary bolt, locking with two lugs. Loading is performed with a pull/push action using the round knurled knob to the rear of the weapon. The trigger is single stage with a simple safety at the back of the magazine housing. The detachable single stack magazine contains six or eight rounds (depending on calibre) and serves as a pistol grip with the bottom part enclosed by the plastic cover.

In 2002, Small Arms Review tested the Welrod (in .32 ACP) and found a 34-decibel noise reduction compared to a control pistol with a same length (3.25 inch) barrel for a final 122.8 decibel value. Earlier sound measurements did not meet the standards in place in 2002. According to Small Arms Review, the lower earlier measurements were "Undoubtedly [...] a function of the available measuring equipment (including excessive meter rise time)". A fully refurbished Welrod sounds quieter than a CO_{2} pellet pistol, with Philip H. Dater calling it "Hollywood quiet". The Welrod's sound is almost imperceptible at 15 feet in a quiet environment and it would be inaudible to the operator in a noisy environment where the muzzle is in contact with the target.

== Use ==
There was a plan in 1943 to drop Welrods into German-occupied territories for the mass assassination of Schutzstaffel (SS) and Gestapo officers and soldiers within a one-month period by resistance units. This plan was possibly delayed or called off in the aftermath of Operation Anthropoid, the assassination of Reinhard Heydrich by Czech resistance forces. In the wake of his assassination, an estimated 13,000 civilians were arrested and interrogated, 5,000 civilians murdered in German reprisal killings and the villages of Lidice and Ležáky destroyed.

The Welrod was used in all theatres of the Second World War by Allied forces. Some captured examples may have also been used by Germany against resistance fighters in Denmark.

Post-war, it is reported to have been used during the 1982 Falklands War and during Operation Desert Storm by British Special Forces. Welrod guns were also found in weapons caches from Operation Gladio. The Welrod was used by US Army Special Forces soldiers assigned to Detachment "A" Berlin during the Cold War and by Military Assistance Command, Vietnam – Studies and Observations Group (MACV-SOG).

== See also ==
- Brügger & Thomet VP9 – Swiss integrally suppressed pistol intended for veterinary use
- De Lisle carbine – British World War II suppressed rifle
- PSS silent pistol – Soviet integrally suppressed firearm
