= Hugh Reeves =

British inventor and engineer (1909-1955)

Hugh Quentin Alleyne Reeves (1909 – 25 October 1955) was a British inventor and engineer. He was one of the most productive and creative engineers attached to Station IX the SOE research station during World War II.

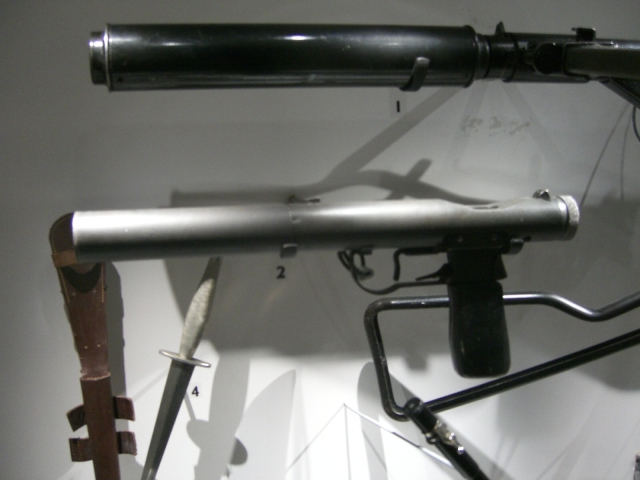
Welrod 9mm pistol (below a suppressed Sten gun) on display at the Imperial War Museum in London

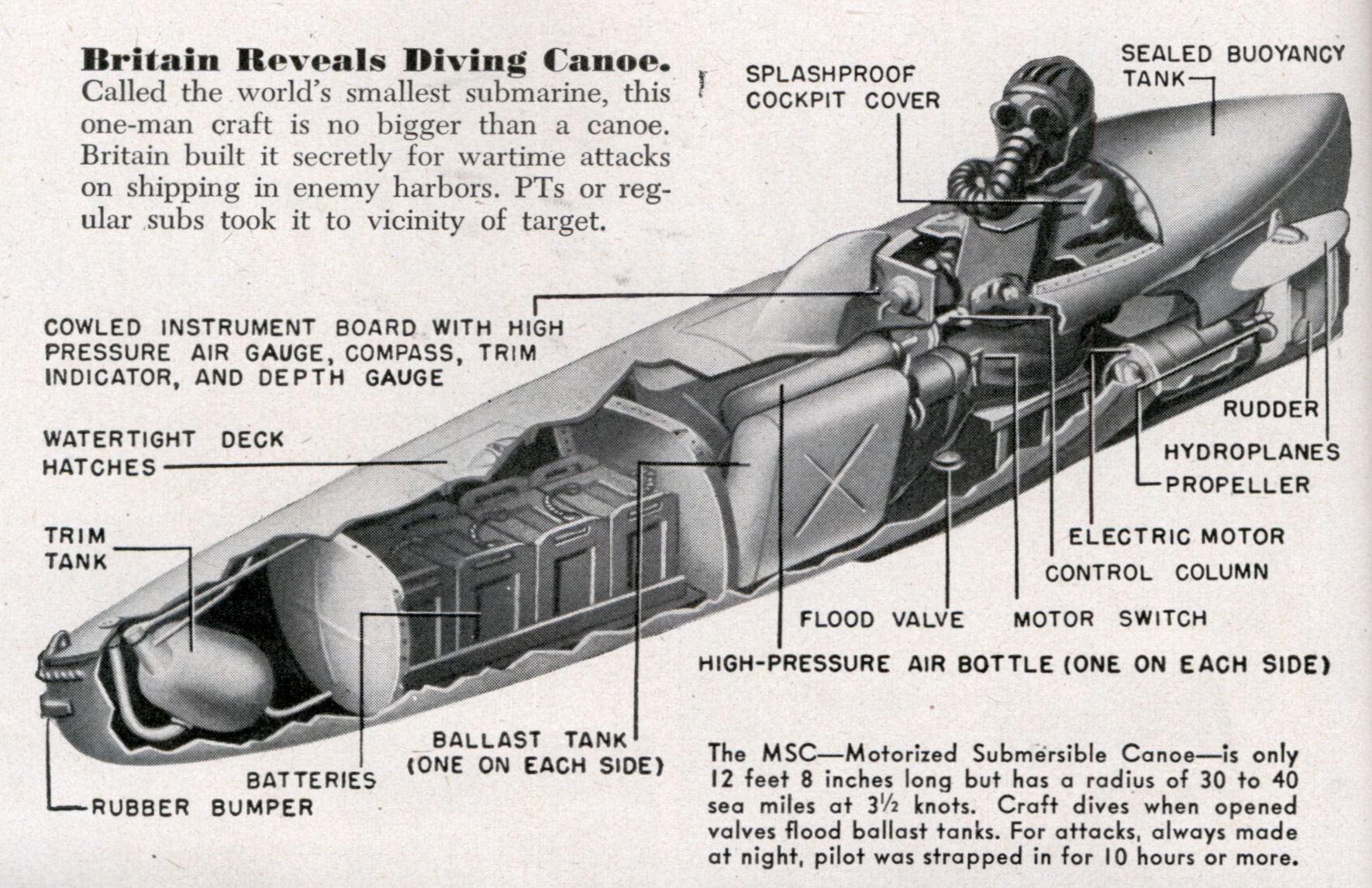
Cutaway image of Sleeping Beauty (Popular Science – March 1947)

Reeves was born at Seaford Sussex. His first prep school was West Downs School at Winchester but he transferred to St Cyprian's School, Eastbourne. He then went to Harrow and Sidney Sussex College, Cambridge.

During World War II Major Reeves was attached to Station IX, where he invented both the Welrod and the sleeve gun (similar to the Welrod, though single shot and intended to be concealed up a sleeve), as well as designing the Motorised Submersible Canoe. He was also, among others, behind the silencer for the Sten gun, fluorescent night sights, the Welgun and the Welbum propulsion system. This was made clear in a document that was produced at the end of the war to ensure that the correct people were credited for their inventions.

Reeves continued inventing after the war with patents for Improvements in Diving Equipment in 1950 and Wheel holding chocks for Aircraft in 1955.

== Death ==
Reeves was involved in a project to reduce noise in jet engines. While carrying out tests at RAF Bitteswell on a Hawker Hunter F.5 fitted with a Sapphire engine, he was suddenly drawn into the intake of the silencer and was killed.
