= Corgi Motorcycle Co Ltd. =

British motorcycle manufacturer

Brockhouse Engineering Ltd
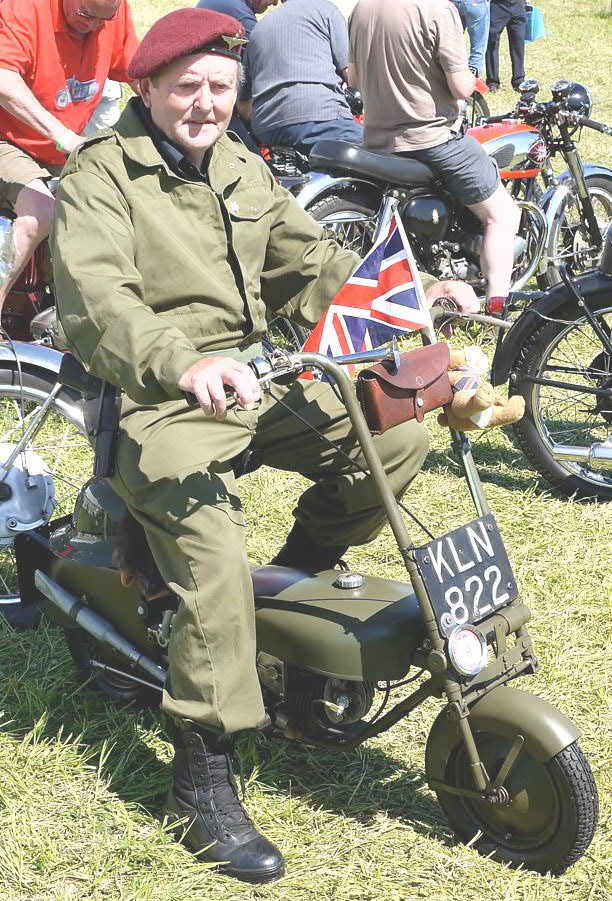
- British Paratrooper re-enactor wearing a Parachute Regiment beret on a Corgi mini motorcycle in 2010
- Type: Private
- Founded: 1946
- Defunct: 1954
- Headquarters: Southport, UK
- Key people: John Dolphin
- Products: Motorcycles

The Corgi Motorcycle Co Ltd. was a British motorcycle manufacturer based in Southport that produced 98 cc scooters developed by managing director John Dolphin from the military Welbike motorcycle. Production of the Corgi scooter for the UK market began in 1948 and 27,050 were manufactured before production ended in October 1954.

== History ==
Founded by managing director John Dolphin at the end of the Second World War in 1946 the Corgi Motorcycle Company was formed to develop a civilian version of his 98 cc Welbike, which had been designed at The Frythe in Hertfordshire to be dropped by parachute to support airborne troops.

The main difference between the Corgi scooter and the Welbike were that frame was more solid (as weight was no longer such an issue) and the Corgi had a fuel tank in the normal motorcycle position between the handlebars and the saddle. Both were otherwise very similar with small wheels and folding handlebars and seat. Both had 98 cc two-stroke engine with a single gear. The original Corgi scooter was started by pushing, but the Mark 2 was fitted with a kick start and two clutches – a conventional handlebar operated clutch and a "dog-clutch" operated by folding down the right hand footrest to engage the rear wheel, to enable the Corgi to be kick-started and run whilst stationary.

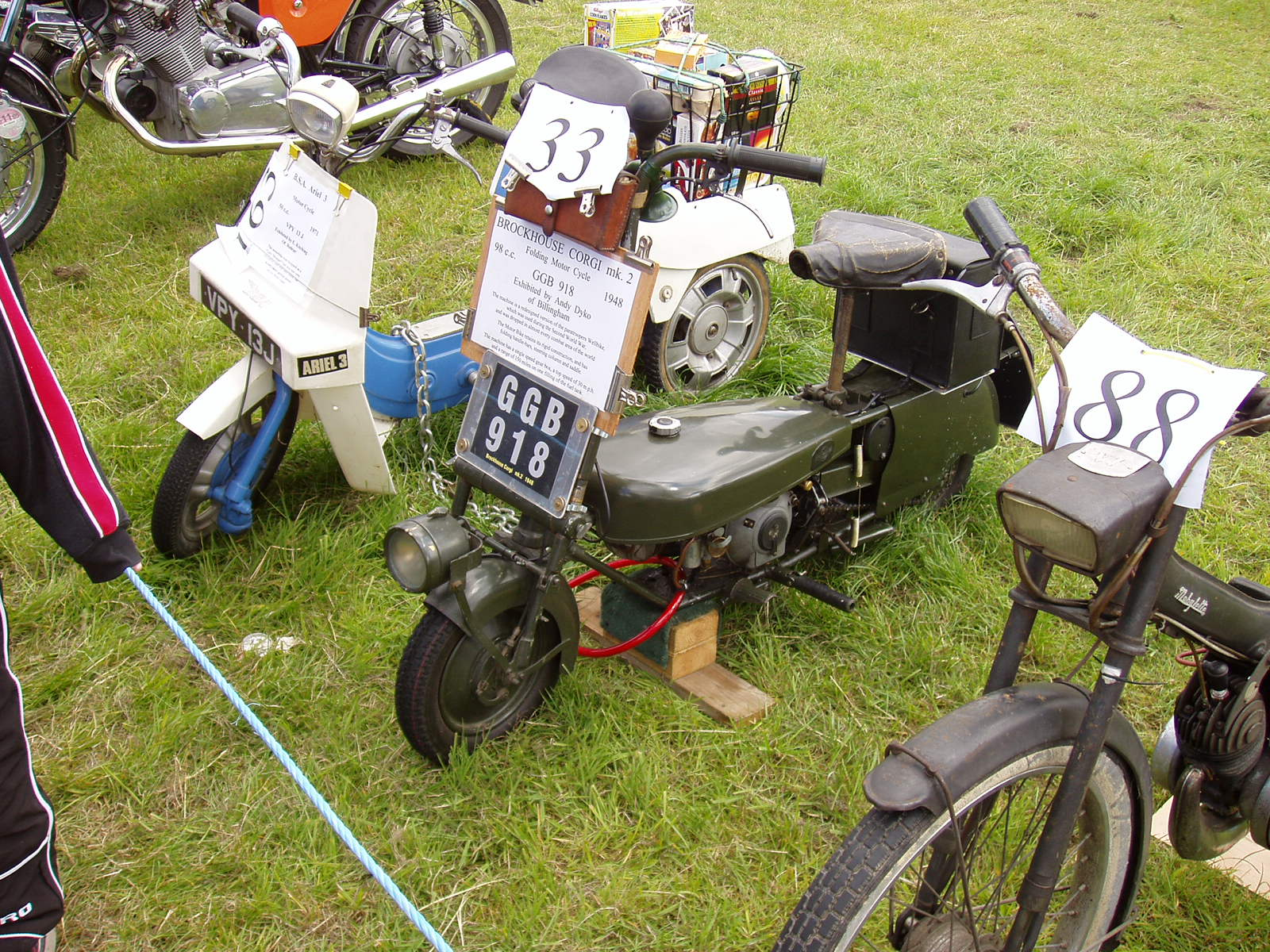
Brockhouse Corgi Mk2

Brockhouse Engineering of Southport built Corgi scooters, powered by an Excelsior Spryt Autocycle engine) under licence. Many of these were exported to the United States between 1947 and 1954. Sold through a department store, the Corgi was branded the Indian Papoose in the US market. Production of the Corgi scooter for the UK market began in 1948. 27,050 were manufactured before production ended in October 1954.

== Owners' club ==
A club for fans of the Brockhouse Corgi was established in June 1948 after a letter was published in Motor Cycling suggesting that owners meet up at Kew Green in south west London that weekend. By 1952 the club had become international and owners were making continental camping trips on their machines.

A Brockhouse Corgi owners' club was restarted in 2011 for everyone interested in the machine. Its aim was to assist owners restore their Corgis and to inform other interested parties of the machine's history.

== Uses ==
As a marketing stunt a Corgi scooter was ridden across the American continent. They were also used by the US Air Force during the Korean War as transport for maintenance staff and were kept aboard aircraft for use by aircrew. Corgi scooters were available with optional sidecars, which were also produced by Brockhouse and a dealer called Jack Olding produced various accessories for the machine including a body kit, making the Corgi look like a step-thru scooter.
