= BSA Welgun =

Welgun
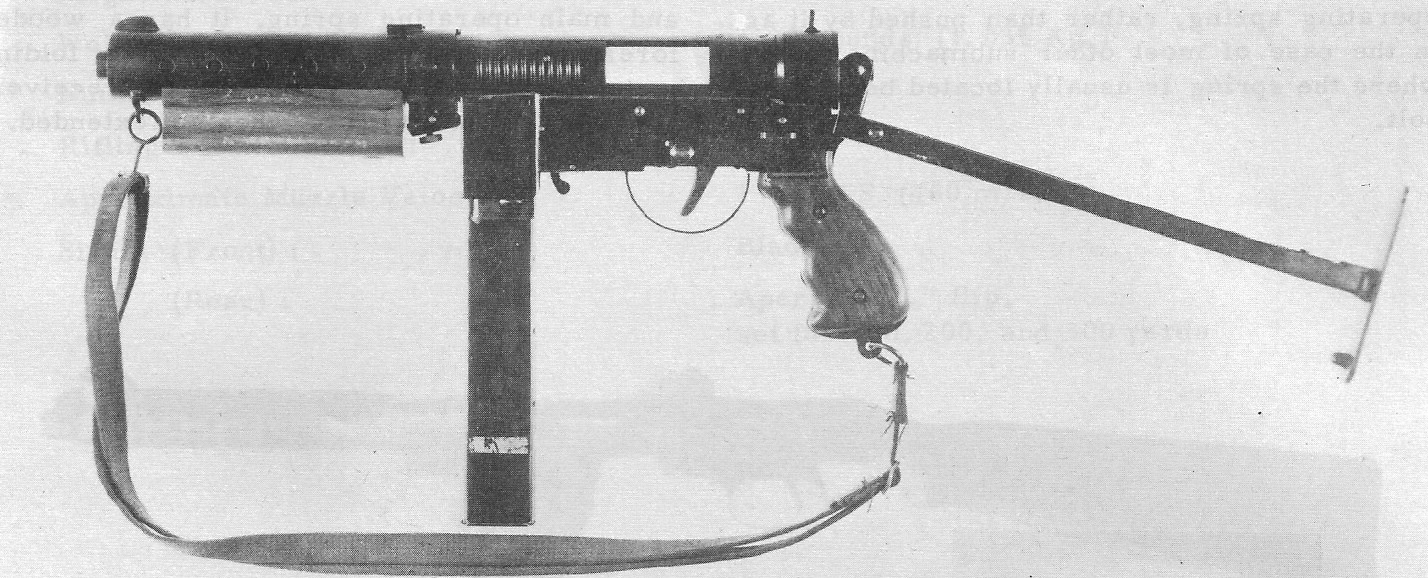
- BSA Welgun submachine gun.
- Type: Submachine gun
- Place of origin: United Kingdom

Service history
- In service: Trials only
- Used by: United Kingdom
- Wars: World War II

Production history
- Designer: F.T. Bridgman
- Designed: 1942
- Manufacturer: BSA
- Produced: 1943

Specifications
- Mass: 6.8 lb (3.1 kg)
- Length: 27.5 in (70 cm)
- Barrel length: 7.8 in (20 cm)
- Cartridge: 9×19mm Parabellum
- Action: Blowback, Open bolt
- Rate of fire: ~500 round/min
- Muzzle velocity: 365 m/s (1,198 ft/s)
- Feed system: 32-rd detachable box magazine
- Sights: Iron

The Welgun was a prototype submachine gun developed by the British irregular warfare organisation, the Special Operations Executive (SOE). Although it performed well in tests, it was never adopted, and was produced in small numbers only.

== Development ==
When issuing arms to resistance fighters throughout Europe, SOE favoured short-range, rapid fire, cost effective weapons which required little training to use, or maintenance in the field. Initially, they favoured the British Army issue crude and cheap Sten sub machine gun, but this weapon perhaps went too far in the directions of cheapness and simplicity. Early marks were notoriously unreliable and prone to accidental discharges, and some were so badly manufactured that they were issued to resistance fighters with "burrs" in the barrel or working parts which might even cause the weapon to explode when fired.

One of SOE's research departments, the Inter Services Research Bureau at Station IX in The Frythe, a former hotel outside Welwyn Garden City, sought a weapon more suited to the organisation's needs in early 1942. They had already produced the prototype Norm Gun (named after its inventor, Eric Norman) but this was too expensive for large-scale manufacture.

A cheaper alternative was produced by F.T. Bridgman. Various other official bodies, and the Birmingham Small Arms factory also had input. In early 1943, Sir Charles Hambro, the Director of the SOE, sought permission to have the weapon put into large-scale production. Six pre-production models were tested against comparative weapons, such as the Sten Mk. IV. The Welgun was less reliable in poor operating conditions such as mud or dust, because the first models had been made with too close tolerances. It was however, more accurate and easier to use. Later pre-production models had more generous tolerances and were as reliable as the Sten under conditions of deliberate abuse. Various Allied commando and Army organisations were enthusiastic about the weapon.

In the event, the Sten Mk. IV was chosen for mass production over the Welgun, though it did not enter widespread service either. No official reason for the Welgun's rejection has survived.

Peter Kemp of SOE was parachuted into Albania with a Welgun, but its first use in battle (ambushing a German staff car) resulted in it jamming, which Kemp attributed to adjustments made previously by an armourer who inadvertently damaged the mechanism.

A similar weapon existed in Croatia invented by J. Barbarić in 1944, in the small village of Čelebić, Livno. An example is on display at the Belgrade Army Museum.

== Design and Characteristics ==
The weapon was a fairly conventional blowback design. It used the same 9mm Parabellum cartridge as the Sten. Since this round was also used by the Axis, resistance fighters could obtain ammunition from enemy sources. The Welgun used the same 32-round single-feed magazine as the Sten, a potential source of trouble as this design was unreliable in service. The magazine fed vertically, rather than sideways as in the Sten.

The Welgun had a folding stock. When this was folded to lie over the barrel and body of the gun, the overall length of the weapon was a little over 16 inches, allowing easy carriage and concealment. The Welgun also had a wooden pistol grip, and vestigial wooden foregrip, which contributed to its accuracy and balance.

== Name ==
The "Wel-" prefix to the weapon's name derives from the village of Welwyn, near which Station IX was located. The prefix identified several weapons and other items of equipment designed or produced by this establishment, such as the Welrod assassination weapon.

== See also ==
- List of submachine guns
- FNA-B X4
