= Motorised Submersible Canoe =

WWII British frogman delivery vehicle

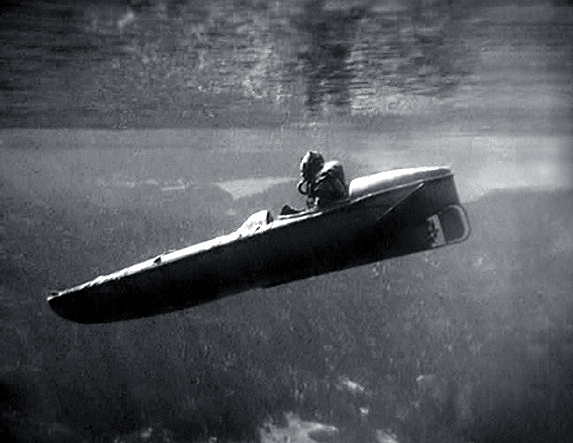
- Sleeping Beauty

Class overview
- Name: Motorised Submersible Canoe
- Operators: United Kingdom Special Operations Executive
- Succeeded by: Swimmer Delivery Vehicle

General characteristics
- Type: Wet sub
- Displacement: 600 pounds (270 kg)
- Length: 12 ft 8 in (3.86 m)
- Beam: 2 ft 3 in (0.69 m)
- Propulsion: One 24v electric motor (5 hp), powered by four 6v batteries
- Speed: 4.4 knots (8.1 km/h) maximum, 3.5 knots (6.5 km/h) cruise
- Range: 40 nautical miles (74 km)
- Test depth: 50 ft (15 m)
- Crew: Single occupancy
- Armament: Nine limpet mines, 3.5 pounds (1.6 kg) of explosives

The Motorised Submersible Canoe (MSC), nicknamed Sleeping Beauty, was an underwater vehicle built by the British Special Operations Executive (SOE) during the Second World War. It was designed to enable a single frogman to sabotage enemy ships, though it would also be used for short-range reconnaissance. They were replaced by the diver propulsion vehicle after the end of the war.

== Design ==
=== History ===
MSCs were initially conceived of in an attempt to create an improved version of the simplistic folboat. It was created by the Allied Inter-Services Research Bureau and designed by Major Hugh Reeves, R.E., who was also given the task of designing an 'unspecified device' for an underwater approach at the confidential research area Station IX. based on an idea from Lt Col "Blondie" Hasler which he called the 'underwater glider' and developed at Aston House to Hasler's specifications. The design process began in 1942 and had all but finished by the end of 1943.

It was originally called the "Underwater Glider", but nicknamed the "Sleeping Beauty" before finally being officially named the Motorised Submersible Canoe. According to one story, the craft became known as "Sleeping Beauty" after Reeves was discovered sleeping in it by a passing officer.

Although originally commissioned for naval battles, Reeves believed that the craft could be sold to civilians to use for pearl-diving and salvage diving.

=== Specifications ===
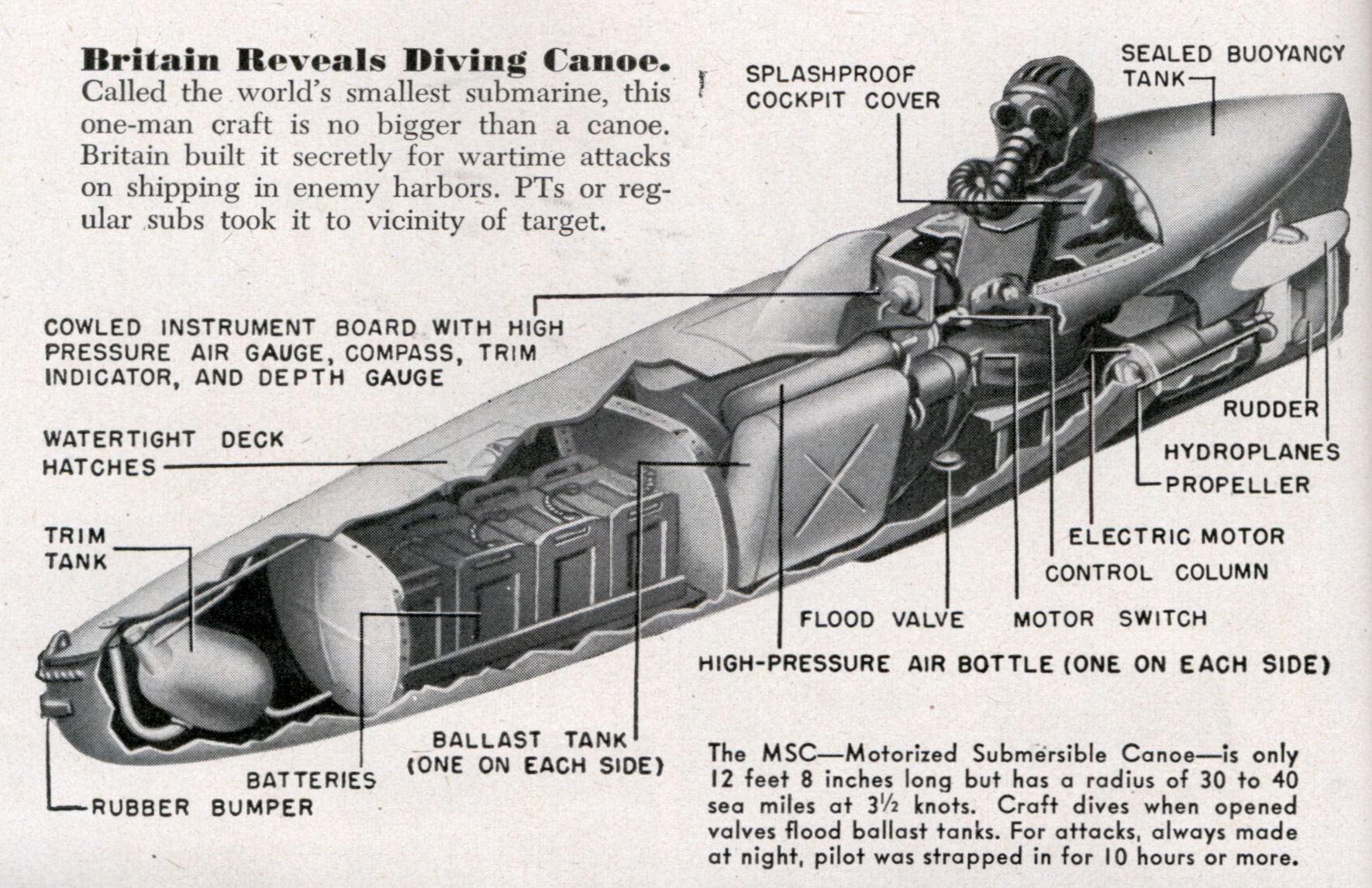
Cutaway image of Sleeping Beauty (Popular Science – March 1947)

Built from mild steel, the canoe was 12 feet 8 inches (3.86 m) long with a beam of 27 inches (0.69 m). A 5 hp electric motor powered by four 6-volt batteries gave the craft a maximum possible speed of 4.4 knots (8.1 km/h). At a crusing speed of 3.1 knots (5.7 km/h), it could travel 30 to 40 nautical miles (56 to 74 km). Its maximum operating depth was 50 feet (15 m).

The Sleeping Beauty was designed to carry up to 3.5 pounds (1.6 kg) of explosives. Located near the pilot's legs were ballast tanks that could either be filled with water or compressed air.

Although the Sleeping Beauty was designed to accommodate only one pilot, a later model did attempt to produce a two-man version post war.

== Operation ==
The MSC moved in several different manners. One of these was nicknamed "porpoising". When "porpoising", the pilot would allow the craft to briefly rise to the surface, re-orientate themselves, then fully re-enter the water in order to move. Alternatively, the pilot would submerge the craft and, guided only by a compass, travel completely underwater. Movement was controlled by means of a joystick attached the two ballast tanks. Upon nearing a target, the pilot would exit the craft and swim the rest of the way. They would then attach one of the nine magnetic limpet mines to the side of the enemy ship. The MSC could also be used for reconnaissance, although its main purpose was for sabotage and attacks.

== Operational service ==
Following Operation Jaywick, a successful 1943 Allied raid in Singapore which used folboats to destroy several Japanese ships, the leader of the raid, Ivan Lyon, a British Lieutenant Colonel and member of the Z Special Unit, was brought to view and train on the Sleeping Beauties. Lyon planned to use the canoes during Operation Rimau in an attempt to sabotage Japanese ships. However, after being found by a Japanese patrol boat during the raid, the canoes were scuttled and Ivan Lyon and his men were killed, captured, and executed. Operatives at Careening Bay continued to be trained on MSCs, but few men were ever able to use them effectively and they never entered into widespread usage.

During the summer of 1944, "Sleeping Beauty Number 72" was delivered to the United States Office of Strategic Services (OSS). It was used for training until August 1945.

== Gallery ==

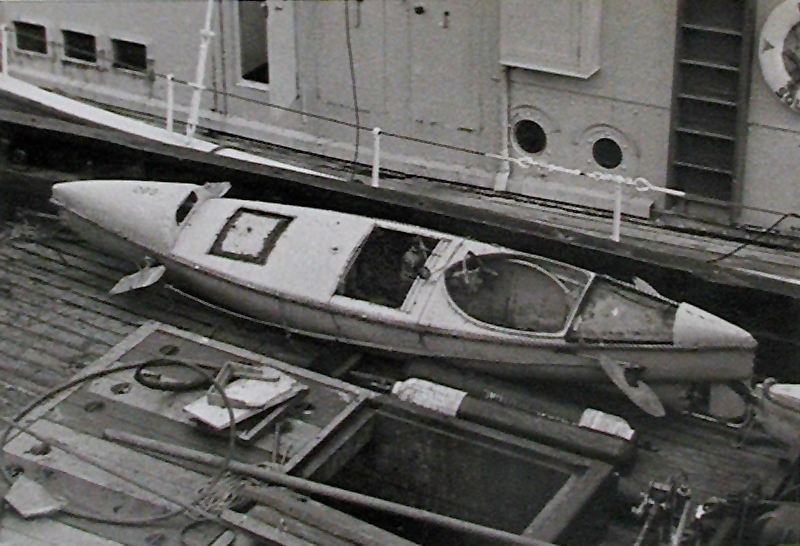
