= John Dolphin =

British Army officer (1905–1973)

- Born: John Robert Vernon Dolphin; 1 October 1905; Christleton, Cheshire, England
- Died: 2 May 1973 (aged 67); Whitchurch-on-Thames, Oxfordshire, England
- Military career
- Allegiance: United Kingdom
- Branch: British Army
- Service years: 1928–1949
- Rank: Lieutenant Colonel
- Nickname: JRV
- Service number: 39713
- Conflicts: World War II
- Awards: Commander of the Order of the British Empire; Territorial Decoration

John Robert Vernon Dolphin CBE TD (1 October 1905 – 2 May 1973) was a British engineer and inventor, who joined the Secret Intelligence Service and then became the Commanding Officer of the top-secret Second World War Special Operations Executive (SOE) "Station IX", where specialist military equipment was developed. During his time there his inventions included the Welman submarine and the Welbike.

On leaving the British Army, Dolphin founded a number of companies, including the Corgi Motorcycle Co Ltd. in 1946 and also set up Dolphin Industrial Developments Ltd and Hydraulic Developments Ltd, which he ran until 1950, when he became Chief Engineer at the Atomic Weapons Research Establishment. Dolphin then went on to become Engineer-in-Chief at the United Kingdom Atomic Energy Authority Research Group until 1959, became joint Managing Director of Lansing Bagnall Ltd and J. E. Shay Ltd until 1964, and a Director of TI (Group Services) Ltd, where he successfully secured patents for a number of inventions, including sheet piling revetments, improvements to fork lift trucks and the forerunner of the modern mobility scooter.

== Early life ==
Dolphin was born in Christleton, a small village on the outskirts of Chester on 1 October 1905, the son of Harold Evelyn Dolphin, and Dorothy Rachel Burton. He attended Marlborough College, a boys boarding school in Wiltshire then went on to Loughborough Engineering College as a student Apprentice. When he graduated at the age of 21 in 1926, he joined a local company Hydraulic Engineering Co. in Chester, where he worked until 1928. He was then appointed as an Inspector for Selection Trust Ltd, where he worked for two years before taking his first management position at Austin Hoy and Co. Ltd. In 1934 he became the Sales Manager and worked as an Engineer at the Sheepbridge Coal and Iron Co. Ltd before setting up his own business, John Dolphin Ltd, Consultants, in 1938.

== Military career ==
Having been a cadet in the Marlborough College Contingent Junior Division Officers' Training Corps, Dolphin was commissioned as a second lieutenant 4th/5th Battalion The Cheshire Regiment (Territorial Army) on 27 April 1928, promoted lieutenant on 27 April 1931, and transferred to the TA Reserve of Officers on 15 July 1931.

He was mobilised on 24 August 1939, shortly before the outbreak of the Second World War in September 1939, and was then given temporary promotions to captain, then to war substantive major and temporary lieutenant colonel in July 1942. His military rank was a cover for his membership of the Secret Intelligence Service, where he was part of the "sabotage service" (Section D). As such, he was involved in plans to create a resistance organisation in the UK. He became the commanding officer of the top-secret Inter-Services Research Station at Welwyn in Hertfordshire code-named Station IX in June 1943.

On 1 June 1943, he was transferred to the Royal Electrical and Mechanical Engineers. He returned to the TA reserve of officers after the war and was promoted to substantive major on 1 January 1949.

He retired from military service with the honorary rank of lieutenant colonel on 12 November 1960.

== Station IX ==
The Special Operations Executive (SOE) was formed on 19 July 1940 to support the organisation of agents and cells of resistance throughout occupied Europe and provide weapons and special equipment. The SOE headquarters was at 64 Baker Street in London, under the cover name of the Inter Services Research Bureau (ISRB). The ISRB had several workshops and laboratories throughout England. Dolphin was the Commanding Officer of the SOE unit code-named "Station IX", which was responsible for the development and production of weapons for the SOE at a mansion called The Frythe, about an hours drive north from London near the town of Welwyn, which had been an exclusive hotel but was commandeered in August 1939 by the British Military Intelligence.

Under the Chief of Scientific Research, Professor D.M. Newitt, secret research included military vehicles and equipment, explosives and technical sabotage, camouflage, biological and chemical warfare. In the grounds of the Frythe small cabins and barracks functioned as laboratories and workshops.

It was an unusual organisation to command for, as well as being heavily guarded by alsatian dogs; the personnel included civilian scientists and craftsmen, who like Dolphin received "war service" military rank, and military personnel from all three services, who all wore their own regimental badges and uniform. All machines developed for the SOE by Station IX at Welwyn were given prefix "Wel-", i.e. "Welbike".

== The Welbike ==
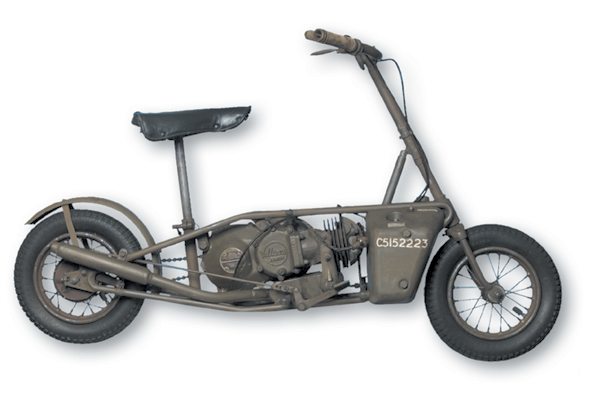
Welbike

Dolphin was a keen motorcyclist (he owned a 1000cc Ariel Square Four), and with design help from Harry Lester, a former racing bike engineer, they developed a prototype of a small folding motorbike that could be dropped in a parachute container and be used by paratroopers. Codenamed the "Welbike", this was to be the first operational transport for individual parachutists. The Welbike was the smallest motorcycle ever used by the British Armed Forces. Between 1942 and 1945, 3853 were built, and although it was not much used by the SOE, many were issued to the Parachute Regiment and used at Arnhem during Operation Market Garden.

== The Welman one-man submarine ==
Dolphin invented the "Welman", a one-man submarine that was prototyped at Station IX. The miniature submarine had no periscope, so it was hard to navigate, as the submariner had to look through specially armoured glass segments in the small "conning tower". The Welman was designed to attach 560-pound explosive charge to its target by magnetic clips, but this could not be made to work reliably.

It was decided to try the Welman submarine in an attack on the Floating Dock in Bergen harbour, so on 20 November 1943 motor torpedo boats MTB 635 and MTB 625 left Lunna Voe, Shetland, carrying Welmans W45 (Lt. C. Johnsen, Royal Norwegian Navy), W46 (Lt. B. Pedersen, Norwegian Army), W47 (Lt. B. Marris, RNVR) and W48 (Lt. J. Holmes, RN). The craft were launched at the entrance to the fjord. Pedersen's W46 became entangled in an anti-submarine net and had to surface, where it was captured by a German patrol craft; Pedersen survived the war in a prison camp. The other three submarines eventually had to be scuttled. Their operators made their way north with the help of Norwegian resistance members and were picked up in February 1944 by MTB 653. The failure made the Royal Navy concentrate on X craft and XE craft, although further Welman trials took place in Australia.

== The Welfreighter ==
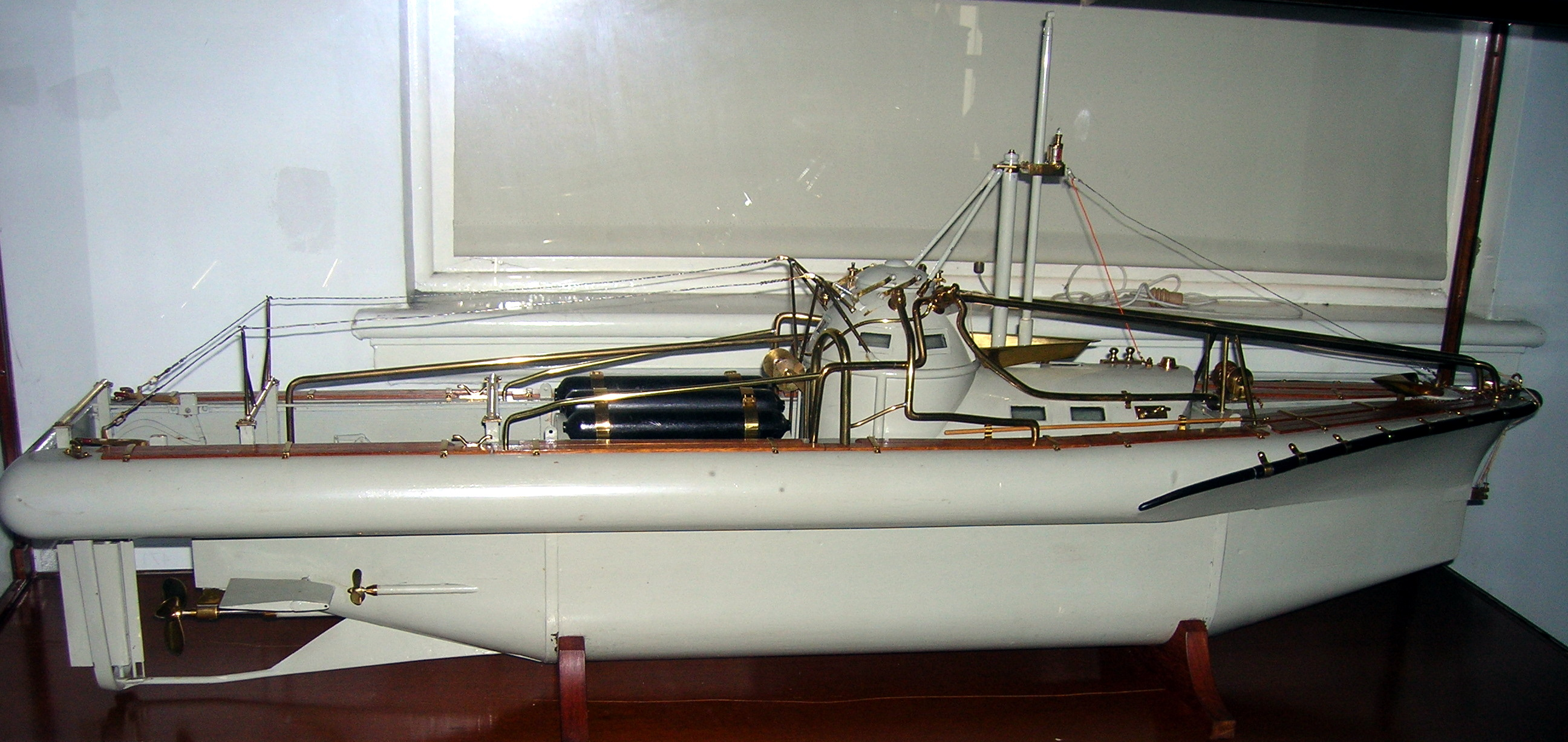
Model of a Welfreighter Mark III

Dolphin took personal charge of the secret project to develop a 37 ft (11 m) miniature submarine, which was code-named the Wellfreighter, developed during World War II by the British Special Operations Executive. Classified Top Secret for over 50 years, it is only in recent times that Government files detailing the existence of this project have been made available for historical research. The Welfreighter was intended to provide landing and supply of secret agents behind enemy lines, as well as use for gathering of coastal intelligence and carrying Special Forces personnel on sabotage operations and the deployment of mines in enemy harbours. A sea trials unit called Station IXa was set up at Goodwick near Fishguard in West Wales, where the prototypes were tested. In 1944 several were sent to Australia for tropical testing.

== Civilian career ==
Dolphin became the Managing Director of the Corgi Motorcycle Co Ltd. in 1946 and also set up Dolphin Industrial Developments Ltd, and Hydraulic Developments Ltd, which he ran until 1950. By 1949 he had designed and built a retractable hardtop body on an Allard chassis. He became Chief Engineer at the Atomic Weapons Research Establishment from 1951 to 1957. He then went on to become Engineer-in-Chief at the United Kingdom Atomic Energy Authority Research Group until 1959 and became joint Managing Director of Lansing Bagnall Ltd and J. E. Shay Ltd until 1964. He then moved on to become a Director of TI (Group Services) Ltd, where he remained until 1968.

== Other inventions ==
A prolific inventor, in addition to his secret work for the SOE during the War, Dolphin continued to explore innovative engineering solutions and in the late 1960s patented 16 inventions including:

=== Battery-powered tricycles ===
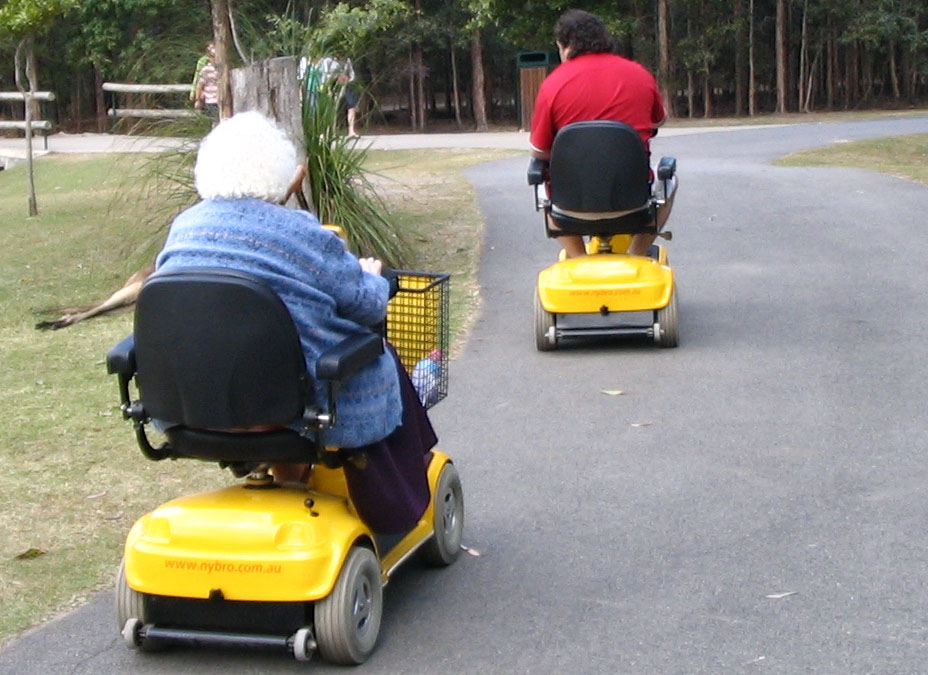
Modern mobility scooters

When he was working for T.I. Group, Dolphin patented a hinged frame and steerable wheeled vehicle, which was a battery-powered tricycle. From the drawings on the patent application it can be seen that this was influenced by his work on the Welbike and was one of the forerunners of the modern mobility scooter. Dolphin's design had steerable front wheel with stability provided by two rear wheels. His aim was to "provide a simple, yet effective, form of personalised transport which will possess the stability of a conventional tricycle yet will be steered by balance as with a conventional bicycle". The vehicle was expected to include a power unit, for example, a battery-driven electric motor or an internal combustion engine, supported on the "stable" rear wheels.

=== Improvements to industrial trucks ===
When he was Managing Director of Lansing Bagnall, a truck manufacturer in Basingstoke, Hampshire Dolphin patented a number of inventions relating to invention improvements to industrial truck, including remote operation and steering mechanisms.

With a design team consisting of Russell Bruce, Kent Ivor and James Charles he patented significant improvements to the invention of the modern-day fork-lift truck which has had a significant impact on international commerce through palletised container movements. In particular, Dolphin proposed a design of the lifting carriage of a masted fork-lift truck which applies a downward thrust to counteract the bending moment produced on the mast by the load on the load support The team also patented a solution to prevent fork-lift trucks having to keep repositioning to lift loads by designing a horizontally movable slide.

=== Saddles and frames for bicycles ===
Working with the Raleigh Bicycle Company, Dolphin patented a number of inventions relating to the improvement of bicycles and, in particular, a method of mounting a saddle on a bicycle so that it can be moved from an erected or riding position to a folded position for storage or transport. He also invented mechanisms for the Raleigh folding bicycle.

=== Construction of roads and revetments ===
While at T.I. Group in Edgbaston, Birmingham, Dolphin was awarded a patent for his invention of improvements to the design of roadside kerbs. The new design was described as "particularly suitable for rapid and economical edging of country roads in such a way that the metal of the roadway is contained, spillage of dirt from the verges onto the roadway is avoided, and a drainage channel for surface water is provided". He also patented a design for pre-fabricated multi-level roadways and one of his most important inventions, sheet pile revetments for waterways. This invention has had a significant benefit for the reclamation of land in waterfront areas such as Cardiff Bay. The patent describes the solution as "revetments or retaining walls for the banks of rivers or canals and concerns an arrangement, particularly suitable for rivers and canals which are relatively shallow at the banks, in which the revetment comprises a series of sheet metal plates arranged end-to-end and suitably secured together to form a wall of sheet metal pile sections, driven into the ground vertically by a power hammer and interlocked so that a complete wall of steel piles is provided between the bank and the water. The wall is retained by tie bars linking it to anchor plates set in the bank well inshore. This system of piling is undoubtedly desirable, if not essential, for deep waterways or those subject to heavy erosion, such as tidal waters."

=== Mobile exercising equipment ===
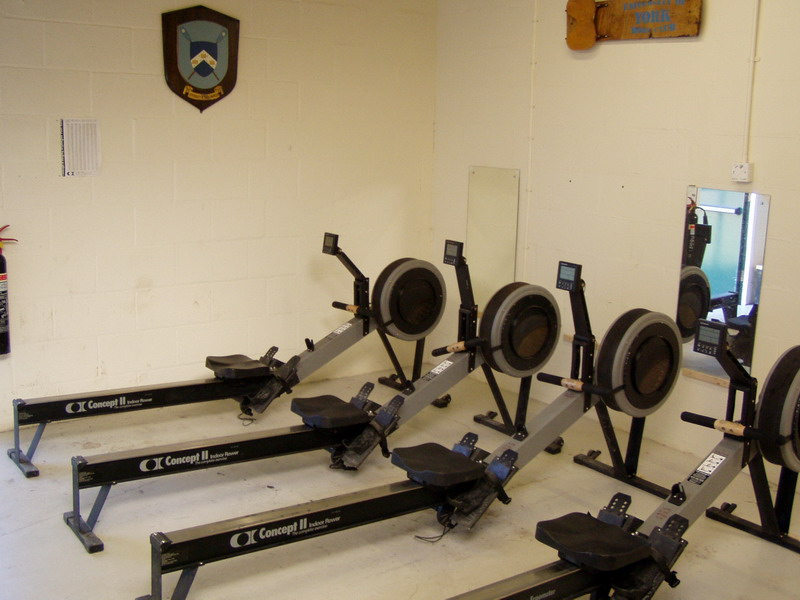
Modern indoor rowing machines

While with the T.I. Group Dolphin, invented and patented a "jumping apparatus" consisting of a tubular post with footrests supported by a spring on a post, mounted on a three-wheeled carriage. The user would have to jump up and down to "establish a forward drive to wheels through a free-wheel device".

More successful was his invention of an exercising machine consisting of "a flywheel rotatably mounted in fixed bearings, a winding spool fixed to rotate with the flywheel and a cable one end of which is connected to the core of the spool in such a way that on rotation of the flywheel with the cable fully unwound, the cable winds onto the spool in one or other direction depending on the direction of rotation of the flywheel". From the patent it can be seen that this was the principle used for rowing machines and exercise equipment.

== Red Beard atomic bomb ==
While he was chief engineer at the Atomic Weapons Research Establishment Dolphin worked (initially at Fort Halstead) on the first British tactical nuclear weapon codenamed Red Beard. In 1959, he requested a financial award for his work on the weapon, but was turned down. His claim was that although it was not his job to do so, he invented the device that eventually became the trigger for the British thermonuclear bomb. In rejecting his claim, the report written by a retired High Court Judge stated that Dolphin's actual job responsibilities were primarily in designing and building the infrastructure of the newly created AWRE on the Aldermaston site, not primarily weapons engineering. His claim was refused partly on the grounds that it was within the scope of his duties. The report also rejected Dolphin's claim that the Red Beard device became the trigger for the British thermonuclear bomb, and stated that the original Red Beard Mk.1 warhead design that had failed to fully trigger the British thermonuclear test devices at Christmas Island in 1957, was considerably modified using American information made available after signing of the Anglo-US Bilateral Treaty of 1958. Production examples of the Red Beard tactical nuclear weapon never used Dolphin's ideas, and after the 1958 Treaty no British thermonuclear weapon ever used Red Beard as the primary or trigger.

Red Beard used a barium-based HE composition (baratol) at a time when British nuclear scientists had not yet understood fully that the primary ignition mechanism of a fusion device was by X-rays, the Teller–Ulam theory. Barium blocks X-rays, so Red Beard could never function effectively as a trigger. It was the Report's conclusion that Dolphin's claim should be rejected, as it was made some time after he left AWRE and had no knowledge of these later developments.

Insofar as Mr Dolphin's claim rests on his contribution to Red Beard, this is a model [design] of which AWRE is not proud; as an atomic bomb in its own right it will be out of service as soon as possible; and it will never be used as the trigger for the H-bomb. It is true that a descendant of Red Beard, ... was still being used in trials when Mr Dolphin left AWRE in 1957 and ceased to be informed about weapon development. Current firing systems are based on US ideas, and owe nothing to Mr Dolphin.

— Extract from the report

After leaving his employment at AWRE Aldermaston, Dolphin was employed for two years as Engineer-in-Chief at Research Group, Atomic Energy Research Establishment, Harwell, where the Report states that he had contact with a former naval officer Commander Lane, employed at the UKAEA civilian reactor at Winfrith, Dorset. Cmdr Lane had previously been CO of an Admiralty torpedo establishment and received an award in 1959 from the Admiralty in connection with an invention related to torpedoes, and torpedo development was his job. The Report stated that Dolphin may have been influenced by that award to make his own claim.

== Honours ==
As well as receiving the Territorial Army Decoration (TD) for long service, Dolphin was appointed Commander of the Order of the British Empire (CBE) in the 1956 Birthday Honours.

== Later life ==
John married Mary Evelyn Fisher in 1966 when he was aged 61. He died on 2 May 1973 (aged 67) in Whitchurch-on-Thames, Oxfordshire.
