= Charles Wilshere =

English landowner and art collector

Charles Willes Wilshere (1814–1906) was an English landowner, now best known as a collector of early Christian art.

== Life ==
He was the third son of Thomas Wilshere of Hitchin, and his wife Lora Beaumont, daughter of Charles Beaumont of Hartford Hill, Huntingdonshire; he was the younger brother of William Wilshere MP (1806–1867), and nephew of William Wilshere (1754–1824) the banker. His sister Laura married Thomas Mills MP.

Wilshere matriculated at Trinity College, Cambridge in 1833, and was admitted at Lincoln's Inn in 1836. He supported the Tractarian movement of the 1830s and 1840s, and later the English Church Union. In 1884 Harmer Green Chapel, a short way east of Welwyn, was built to a design by Wilshere and opened as a mission room. According to F. J. A. Hort's biographer, he was "a student of ecclesiastical history and antiquities."

In 1858 Wilshere joined the Alpine Club. In 1867, on the death of his brother William, he inherited The Frythe.

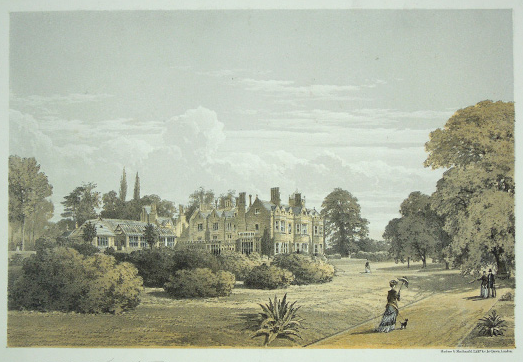
The Frythe Welwyn, Seat of Charles Willes Wilshere Esqure J.P., 1877 lithograph

== Collection and legacy ==
Wilshere is particularly known for his collection of gold glass. The Vetri ornati di figure in oro: trovati nei cimiteri cristiani di Roma (1858) of Raffaele Garrucci explains the origins of the "Recupero collection", named for barone Alessio Recupero of Catania. Wilshere purchased from the collection at Capobianchi, dealers on Via del Babuino, Rome. At the time, the pieces were dated to the 4th century. A note to Charles Drury Edward Fortnum shows that Wilshere used the diplomatic bag to have Recupero collection pieces shipped from Florence to the South Kensington Museum.

Left by Wilshere to Pusey House, Oxford, the collection was for many years on loan to the Ashmolean Museum. In 2007 the Ashmolean purchased it. Wilshere had bought larger antiquities, but the rest of his collection proved harder to place. At one point he told Garrucci that he might create a museum of his own.

Wilshere corresponded, in Italian, with the Italian archaeologist Giovanni Battista de Rossi, and a collection of 69 letters from him to de Rossi are in the Vatican Library.

== Family ==
Wilshere married in 1840 Elisabeth Marie Farmer, daughter of William Meeke Farmer MP. The couple had four daughters. Florence (1848–1877), the third daughter, married in 1869 Guilbert Edward Wyndham Malet of the Royal Horse Artillery, son of the Rev. William Wyndham Malet of Ardeley. Alice Augusta, the last surviving daughter, left no heir, and on her death in 1934 the estate was inherited by Gerald Maunsell Gamul Farmer, who took the surname Wilshere.
