= Willshire =

Willshire may refer to:

== People ==
- William Willshire (c. 1790–1851), British diplomat
- William Willshire (policeman) (1852–1925), first Australian police officer to be charged for murder
- Willshire baronets, UK baronetcy

== Places ==
- Willshire, Ohio, a village in the United States
- Willshire Township, Van Wert County, Ohio, a township in the United States

== See also ==
- Wilshire (disambiguation)
