= Wilshire (surname) =

Wilshire is an English surname. Notable people with the surname include:

- Albert Edward Wilshire (1863–1935), English organist and composer
- Brian Wilshire, Australian talk radio host
- Bruce Wilshire, American philosopher and professor at Rutgers University
- David Wilshire (1943–2023), British politician
- Gaylord Wilshire (1861–1927), American land developer, namesake of Wilshire Boulevard in Los Angeles, California
- Henry Austin Wilshire, Australian architect
- Jack Wilshire, English footballer
- James Robert Wilshire (1809–1860), Australian politician
- James Thompson Wilshire (1837–1909), Australian politician, son of James Robert Wilshire
- Mary Wilshire, American comics artist
- Nicky Wilshire (born 1961), English boxer
- Spencer Wilshire (born 1945), Welsh lawn and indoor bowler
- William W. Wilshire (1830–1888), American politician

== See also ==
- Wilshere
