= William Wilshere =

British Whig politician

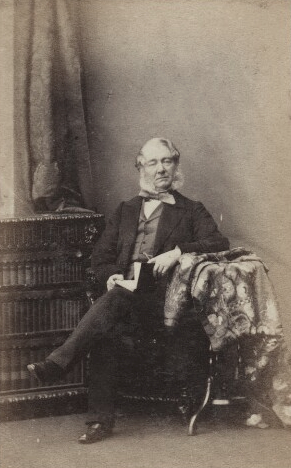
William Wilshere, 1860 photograph

William Wilshere (1806 – 10 November 1867) was a British Whig politician who sat in the House of Commons from 1837 to 1847. He was a banker and a landed proprietor.

== Life ==
He was the son of Thomas Wilshere of The Frythe near Welwyn and his wife Lora, daughter of Charles Beaumont of Houghton, Huntingdonshire. He was educated at Bedford grammar school, and Wadham College, Oxford, where he graduated B.A. in 1827.

While young he was adopted by his uncle William Wilshere (1754–1824), a partner in the Whitbread brewery.

He was elected as the Member of Parliament (MP) for Great Yarmouth at the 1837 general election. He held the seat until 1847.

In 1846 he had a Gothic revival mansion built at The Frythe, the family estate near Welwyn, to the design of Thomas Smith and Edward Blore.

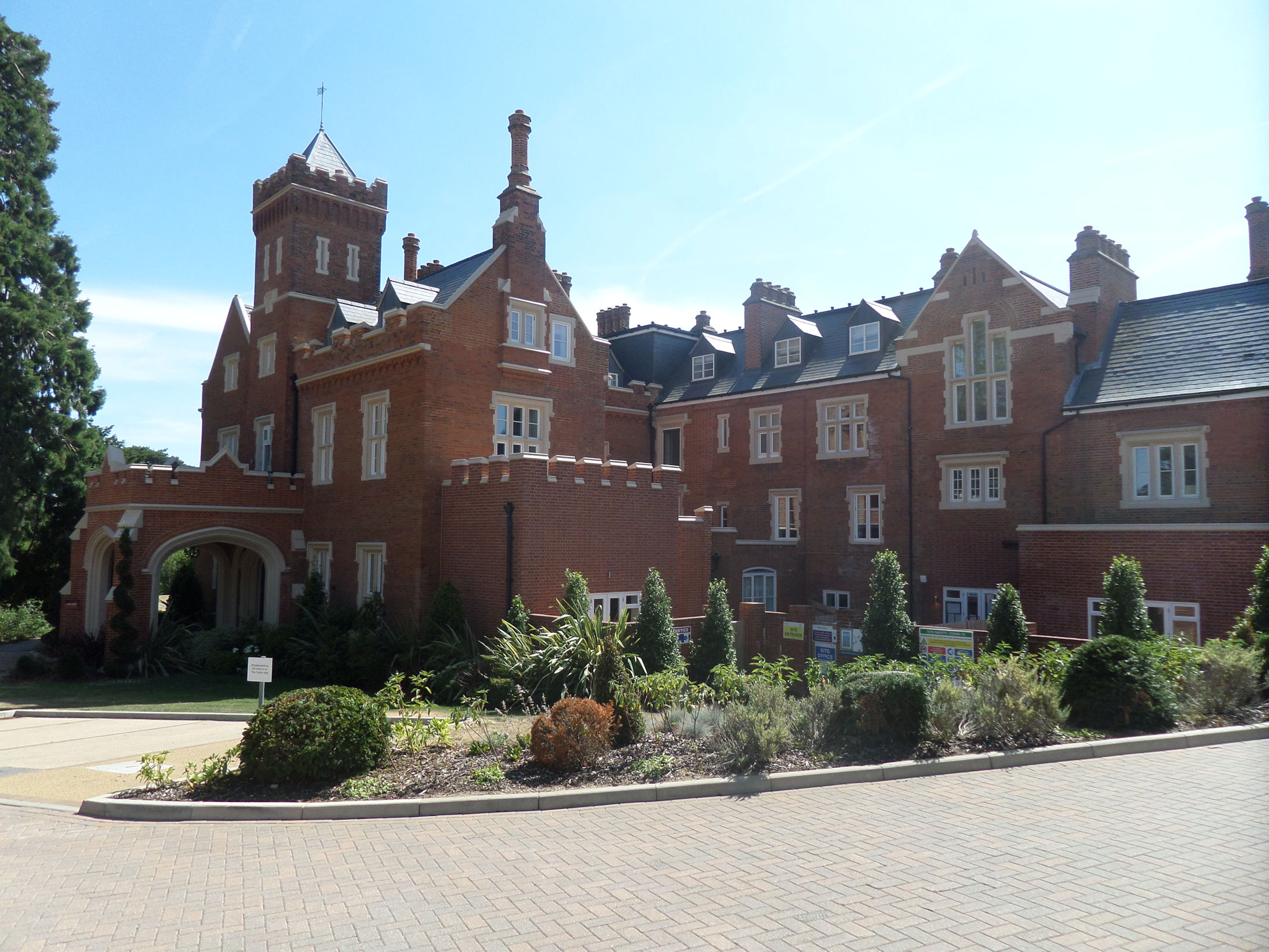
The Frythe

In 1858, he became High Sheriff of Hertfordshire. He died unmarried at the age of 61. The Frythe passed to his younger brother Charles Willes Wilshere.

Parliament of the United Kingdom
Preceded by Thomas Baring; Winthrop Mackworth Praed	Member of Parliament for Great Yarmouth; 1837 – 1847; With: Charles Rumbold	Succeeded by Lord Arthur Lennox; Octavius Coope
