= William Wilshere (lawyer) =

English lawyer and banker

William Wilshere (1754–1824) was an English lawyer and banker. He was an attorney in Hitchin, where he founded a bank in 1789, and a Lancasterian School in 1810.

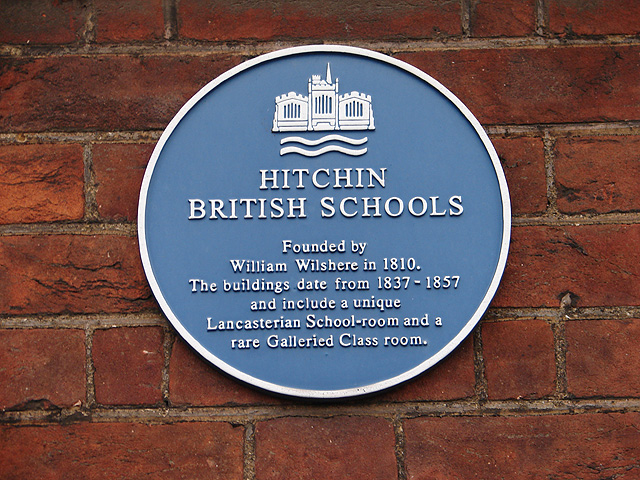

== Life ==
He was born 6 September 1754, the son of William Wilshere (died 1798). He became attorney to Samuel Whitbread in 1780, beginning a long and close relationship as adviser and agent, which also saw him as a financial partner in the Whitbread brewery from 1801, when others including the banker Sir Benjamin Hobhouse were brought into the company.

At the period of the French Revolution Wilshere was sufficiently concerned to fortify his house in Hitchin. In 1806 Whitbread and Wilshere began a campaign for reform of the Poor Laws, and Wilshere provided Whitbread with material for a speech in the House of Commons on the topic on May of that year. Also that year he purchased the manor Great Wymondley from Shute Barrington. The purchase brought with it the right to be cupbearer at royal coronations, and Wilshere carried out the office for the coronation of George IV of the United Kingdom. This was the last time the tradition was honoured. Fulford speculates that this royal service may have damaged Wilshere's reputation among Whigs.

Wilshere was a magistrate in both Bedfordshire and Hertfordshire. He testified to an 1817 House of Lords committee on the Poor Laws that he found it necessary to give relief without regard to whether the recipients were deserving, to save life.

== Legacy ==
Wilshere died without surviving children on 2 September 1824. His estate passed to William Wilshere the future Member of Parliament, the son of his brother Thomas, whom he had adopted.

Wilshere's school at Hitchin, which started in an old malt house which he owned, was given purpose-built accommodation after his death. It survives as the British Schools Museum.
