= Welman submarine =

Second World War one-man British midget submarine

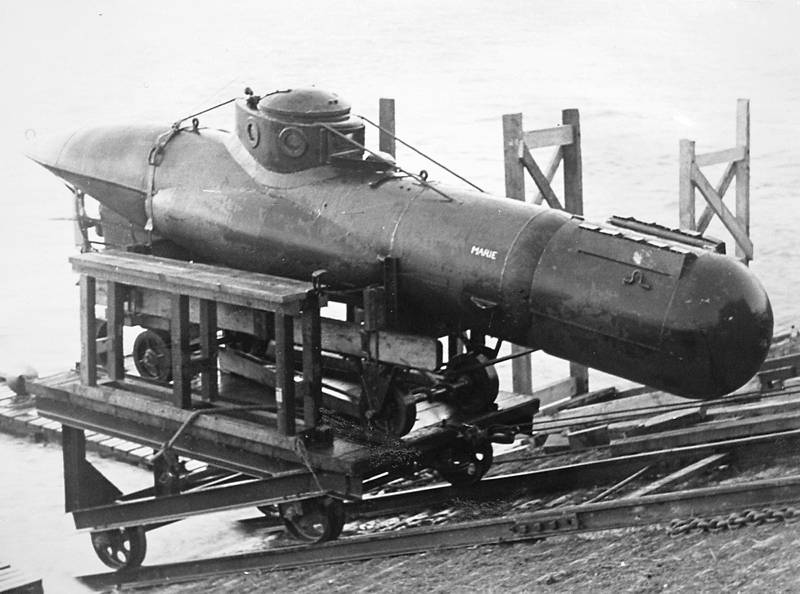
- Welman with detachable warhead being trialled at Queen Mary Reservoir, Staines

Class overview
- Name: Welman submarine
- Builders: Morris Motors Limited
- Operators: United Kingdom Special Operations Executive
- Completed: 100+

General characteristics Welman submarine
- Type: midget submarine
- Displacement: 2,000 pounds (910 kg) without warhead; (warhead: 500 pounds (230 kg))
- Length: 17 ft 3 in (5.26 m) without charge; 20 ft 6 in (6.25 m) with charge
- Propulsion: One electric motor, 2.5 hp, powered by a 40v 220amp/hr battery.
- Speed: 3 knots (5.6 km/h)
- Range: 36 nautical miles (67 km) at 3 knots (5.6 km/h)
- Test depth: 300 ft (91 m) (reduced to 100 ft (30 m) after trials)
- Crew: 1
- Armament: 1 x detachable charge of 425 pounds (193 kg) of Torpex

The Welman submarine was a Second World War one-man British midget submarine developed by the Special Operations Executive. It only saw action once and was not particularly successful.

== Design ==
Designed by the Commanding Officer of SOE's Inter Services Research Bureau (ISRB), Lt Col. John Dolphin, as a method of delivering a large explosive charge below an enemy ship, the Welman was a submersible craft 20 feet 6 inches (6.25 m) in length (including explosive charge), weighing about 2,000 pounds (910 kg). Unlike the "Chariot" human torpedo, the operator was enclosed within the craft, and did not need to wear diving gear. The Welman could transport a 425-pound (193 kg) time-fused explosive charge of Torpex, which was intended to be magnetically attached to a target's hull. Vision was through armoured glass segments in the small conning tower, and no periscope was fitted.

== Production ==
Following trials in the Queen Mary Reservoir near Staines towards the end of 1942, the Welman was put into production, the production being contracted out to Morris Motors Limited's requisitioned factory at Oxford.

Despite the craft's inability to cut a way through anti-submarine nets (which both X class submarines and Chariot manned torpedoes could do) and the poor visibility available to the crewman, 150 production examples were ordered in February 1943.

Production was halted in October 1943 when operational research showed the concept suffered from too many disadvantages, by which time some 100 examples had been produced (precise numbers are unknown).

== Operational service ==
In early 1943 the Royal Navy establishment on board the submarine depot ship HMS Titania was expanded to carry out sea trials of the Welman. Training courses for operators were located at Fort Blockhouse in Gosport. Trainees were drawn from the Royal Navy, the Royal Navy Reserve, and other Special Forces groups which included the Special Boat Section of the Commandos.

HMS Titania was relocated to Loch a' Chàirn Bhàin, south of Cape Wrath, in the north west of Scotland, which became a secret training base for all mini submarine operations. A Welman (W10) was lost on exercise in Rothesay Bay on 9 September.

By autumn 1943, sufficient trained operators and craft existed for the Welman to be considered for operational use.

In the autumn of 1943 the Combined Ops commander, General Sir Robert Laycock (who took over from the then Lord Louis Mountbatten) decided that the Welman was unsuitable for their purposes, so the craft were returned to the Royal Navy. Admiral Sir Lionel Wells, Flag Officer commanding Orkney and Shetland, thought they might be useful for attacks on German shipping using coastal waters inside the Leads off Norway. Motor Torpedo Boats (MTBs) of the 30th Flotilla, manned by officers and men of the Royal Norwegian Navy, were making these raids already and agreed to try the Welmans in an attack on the Floating Dock in Bergen harbour (eventually sunk in September 1944 by X-24). On 20 November 1943 MTB635 and MTB625 left Lunna Voe, Shetland, carrying Welmans W45 (Lt. C. Johnsen, Royal Norwegian Navy), W46 (Lt Bjørn Pedersen (1922), Norwegian Army), W47 (Lt. B. Marris, RNVR) and W48 (Lt. J. Holmes, RN). The craft were launched at the entrance to the fjord.

Pedersen's W46 encountered an anti-submarine net and was forced to the surface, where she was spotted by a German patrol craft. Pedersen was captured along with the Welman, surviving the war in a prison camp. The other three, having lost the element of surprise, could not press the attack and so eventually had to be scuttled. Their operators made their way north with the help of Norwegian resistance members and were picked up in February 1944 by MTB653. The failure made the Royal Navy concentrate on X craft and XE craft, although further Welman trials occurred, especially in Australia.

Subsequent to the failed attack the Germans salvaged one of the craft. Even though the German navy were appalled by the unsophisticated quality of the engineering they found in the Welman, there is some similarity between it and the Biber midget submarines used against Allied shipping in 1944.

The major drawback of the Welman from its operators' point of view was that it had no periscope. Without a way of viewing its surroundings without surfacing, it was impossible to navigate covertly. It was also found that when travelling on the surface the operator's eye level was so close to sea level that objects more than two miles away were not visible.

== See also ==
- Welfreighter
