= The Frythe =

Country house near Welwyn, England

Coordinates: 51°49′12″N 0°13′24″W

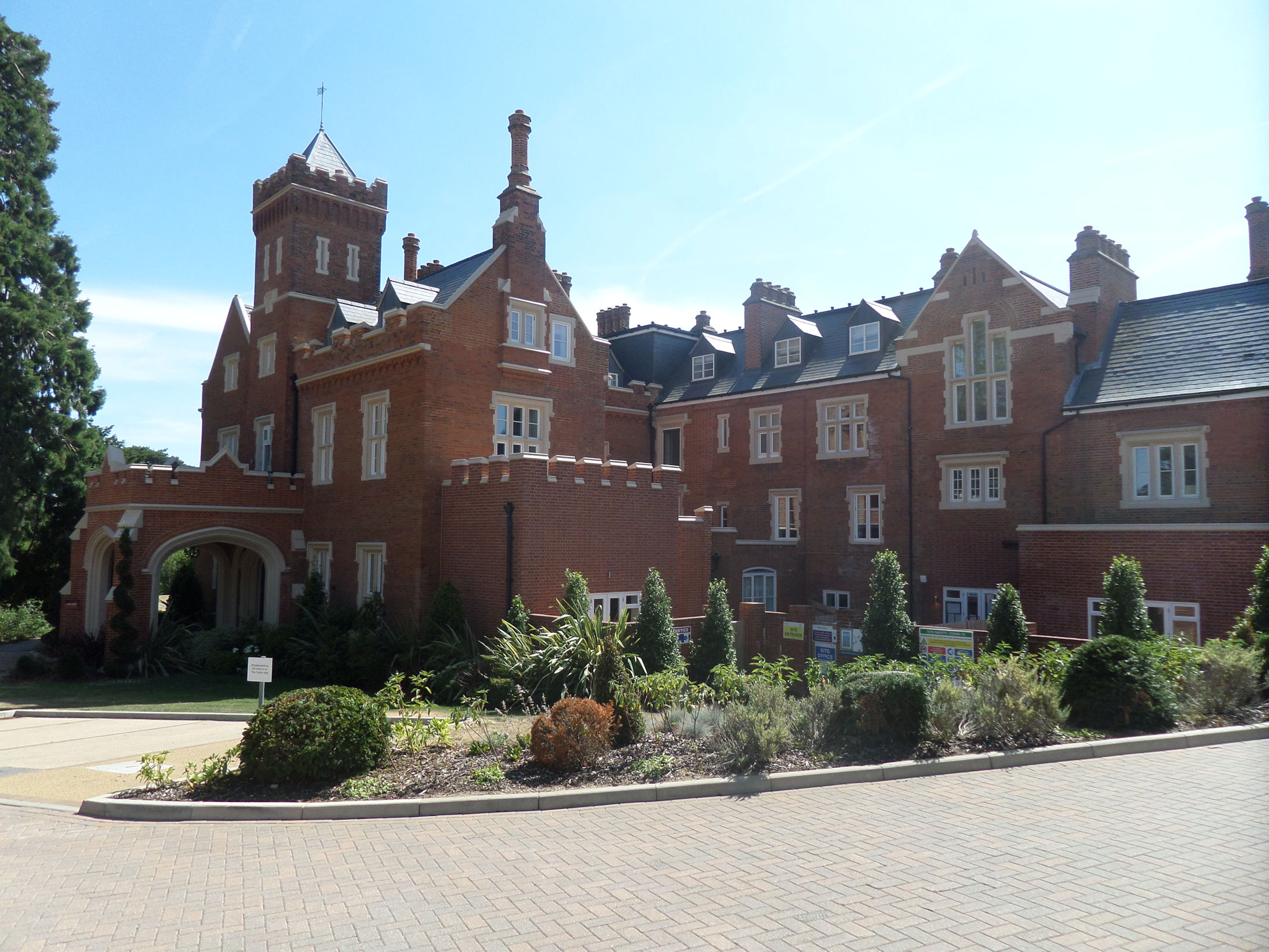
The Frythe in 2022

The Frythe is a country house set in its own grounds in rural Hertfordshire, just south of the village of Welwyn, about 30 miles north of London.

== History ==
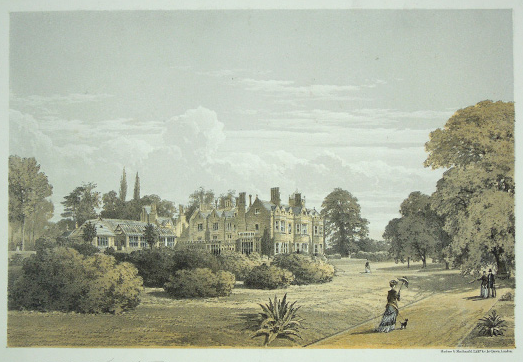
View toward the house in 1877

=== Early history ===
The Frythe was part of the property of Holywell Priory, Shoreditch, and in 1523 William Wilshere obtained a sixty-year lease of the Frythe from the priory. As a result of the dissolution of the monasteries, in 1539 the property was granted to Sir John Gostwick and Joan his wife. Within ten years, Wilshere had purchased The Frythe from Gostwick's heirs, and the property remained in the possession of the Wilshere family for several centuries.

The present "Gothic revival" mansion was built in 1846 for William Wilshere (MP for Great Yarmouth from 1837 to 1846). The architects were Thomas Smith and Edward Blore. After William Wilshere's death in 1867 the house was enlarged by his brother Charles Willes Wilshere who inherited it. In 1908 on Charles Wilshere's death, it passed on to his three unmarried daughters, until the last one died in 1934. The estate passed to a great-nephew, Captain Gerald Maunsell Gamul Farmer, of a landed gentry family of Nonsuch, Surrey, who adopted the surname of Wilshere, and ran the house as "The Frythe Residential and Private Hotel".

=== SOE Station IX ===
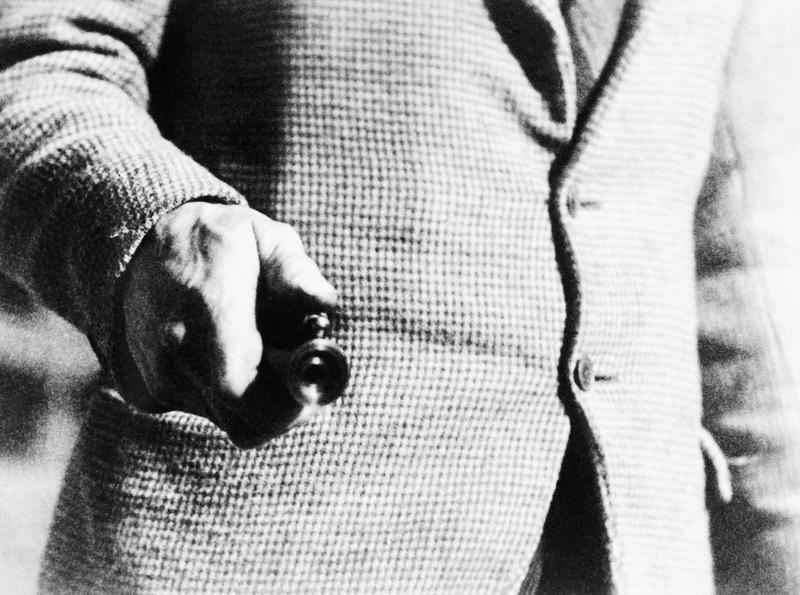
Weapon developed by Station IX

'The Frythe' was commandeered in August 1939 by the British military intelligence. During the Second World War it became a secret British Special Operations Executive factory known as Station IX making commando equipment. Secret research included military vehicles and equipment, explosives and technical sabotage, camouflage, biological and chemical warfare. In the grounds of The Frythe small cabins and barracks functioned as laboratories and workshops.

=== Research facility ===
The Frythe was for many years a commercial research facility, operated by ICI from 1946, known as 'Akers Research Laboratories' from around 1955, named after Sir Wallace Akers, who had died in 1954. From 1963 it was owned by Unilever, and by Smith, Kline & French from 1977.

==== Unilever ====
From 1946 to 1963 the site was shared by ICI with Unilever. New buildings were built by Unilever in the 1960s, with a contract for £400,000 in 1964 to Taylor Woodrow. Research was conducted on edible oils, margarine, ice cream, and frozen foods in the 1960s. Techniques included molecular biophysics, X-ray crystallography, nuclear magnetic resonance spectroscopy (NMR), mass spectrometry, ESR spectroscopy (electron paramagnetic resonance), and infrared spectroscopy.

==== GSK ====
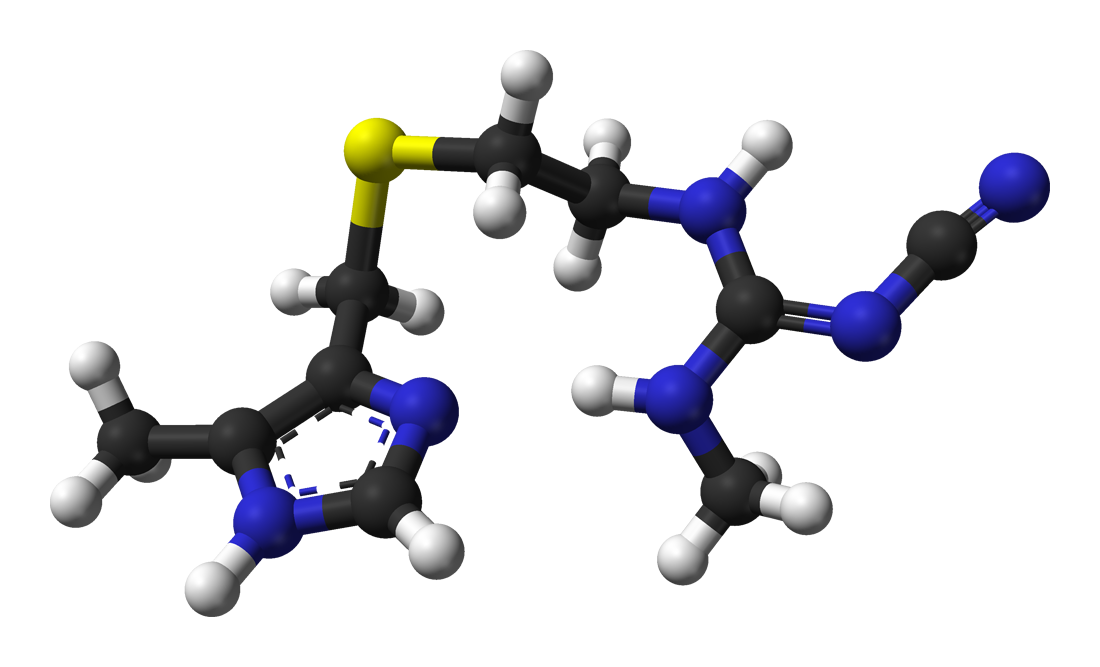
Cimetidine

After Sir James Black and C. Robin Ganellin carried out research on H2 receptor antagonists leading to the discovery of Cimetidine, which treats peptic ulcers, Smith, Kline & French purchased the Frythe and developed their research and development facilities there from 1978. Toxicology facilities were opened in early 1980, with the main research laboratories completed in 1981. The bulk of the scientists moved from the Welwyn Garden City facility to the Frythe in September 1981.

=== Residential accommodation ===
The Frythe site was closed by GlaxoSmithKline and sold to a property development company on 19 December 2010. In 2017, the conversion of the property into flats was still underway.
