= 1961 Birthday Honours =

Appointments made by Queen Elizabeth II

The Queen's Birthday Honours 1961 were appointments in many of the Commonwealth realms of Queen Elizabeth II to various orders and honours to reward and highlight good works by citizens of those countries.

The appointments were made to celebrate the official birthday of The Queen. The announcement date varies, both from year to year and from country to country. The 1961 Queen's Birthday Honours for the United Kingdom, Australia, New Zealand, Nigeria, Sierra Leone, and the Federation of Rhodesia and Nyasaland were announced on 2 June 1961.

The recipients of honours are displayed here as they were styled before their new honour, and arranged by honour, with classes (Knight, Knight Grand Cross, etc.) and then divisions (Military, Civil, etc.) as appropriate.

== United Kingdom and Commonwealth ==
=== Baron ===
- Sir Simon Marks, chairman and Joint Managing Director, Marks & Spencer Ltd. For public and charitable services.
- General Sir Brian Hubert Robertson, Bt, GCB, GBE, KCMG, KCVO, DSO, MC, chairman, British Transport Commission, 1953–1961.

=== Life Peer ===
- Sir Alexander Moncrieff Coutanche, Bailiff of Jersey since 1935.
- The Right Honourable Alfred Robens, chairman, National Coal Board, Parliamentary Secretary, Ministry of Fuel and Power, 1947–1951, Minister of Labour and National Service, 1951.

=== Privy Counsellor ===
- The Right Honourable Jack Nixon, Baron Craigton, CBE, Member of Parliament for the Govan Division of Glasgow, 1950–1955, and for the Craigton Division of Glasgow, 1955–1959. Joint Under-Secretary of State for Scotland, 1955–1959, and Minister of State, Scottish Office, since 1959.
- Sir John Kenyon Vaughan-Morgan, Bt, MP, Member of Parliament for Reigate since 1950. Parliamentary Secretary, Ministry of Health, 1957; Minister of State, Board of Trade, 1957–1959.

=== Baronet ===
- Sir John Maxwell Erskine, GBE, JP, DL, Director, Commercial Bank of Scotland, deputy chairman, North of Scotland Hydro-Electric Board. For public services in Scotland.
- Colonel James Harwood Harrison, TD, MP, Member of Parliament for Eye since 1951. An Assistant Government Whip, 1954–1956; a Lord Commissioner of HM Treasury, 1956–1959; Comptroller of Her Majesty's Household since 1959.
- The Right Honourable Sir Roland Thomas Nugent. Lately Speaker of the Northern Ireland Senate. Minister Without Portfolio, 1944–1945; Minister of Commerce, 1945–1949; Leader of the Senate, 1944–1950. Lord Lieutenant for County Down.

=== Knight Bachelor ===
- William Kenneth Gwynne Allen, chairman and managing director, W. H. Allen, Sons & Co. Ltd., Bedford.
- John Fleetwood Baker, OBE, Professor of Mechanical Sciences and Head of the Department of Engineering, University of Cambridge.
- Sydney Barratt, chairman, Albright & Wilson Ltd.
- John Alan Birch, General Secretary, Union of Shop, Distributive and Allied Workers.
- Thomas Maltby Bland, TD, DL, Chairman of the Executive Council, County Councils Association; Vice-chairman, East Suffolk County Council.
- Professor John Boyd. For political and public services in Glasgow.
- Edward Joseph Brown, MBE. For political services.
- Allen George Clark, chairman and managing director, Plessey Co. Ltd., Ilford, Essex.
- George Trenchard Cox, CBE, Director, Victoria and Albert Museum.
- Harry Guy Dain, MB, FRCS. Lately General Practitioner. For services to the British Medical Association and General Medical Council.
- Robert John Davies, OBE. For political and public services in Wales.
- Arthur Bryce Duncan, lately chairman, Nature Conservancy.
- Lieutenant-Colonel Oliver Eyre Crosthwaite-Eyre, DL, MP, Member of Parliament for the New Forest and Christchurch Division, 1945–1950 and for the New Forest Division since 1950. For political and public services.
- Major-General Evelyn Dalrymple Fanshawe, CB, CBE. For political and public services in the East Midlands.
- Denys Theodore Hicks, OBE, TD, DL, President of The Law Society.
- Austin Bradford Hill, CBE, Professor of Medical Statistics, London School of Hygiene and Tropical Medicine, University of London.
- Charles Frederick William Illingworth, CBE, MD, FRCS(Ed), Regius Professor of Surgery, University of Glasgow.
- Alderman Robert George Caldwell Kinahan, ERD, JP, lately Lord Mayor of Belfast.
- Thomas Malcolm Knox, Principal, University of St. Andrews.
- Henry Desmond Pritchard Lee, Headmaster, Winchester College.
- Reginald Stewart MacTier, CBE, lately chairman, General Council of British Shipping and Liverpool Steamship Owners' Association.
- Cuthbert Gaulter Magee, CBE, MD, FRCP(Ed), Chief Medical Officer, Ministry of Pensions and National Insurance.
- Cyril Osborne, MP, Member of Parliament for Louth since 1945. For political and public services.
- Alderman Alfred George Beech Owen, CBE. For political and public services in Staffordshire.
- Ralph Hubert John Delmé-Radcliffe. For political services in Hitchin.
- Herbert Vere Redman, CMG, OBE, Counsellor (Information), HM Embassy, Tokyo.
- Harold Ernest Snow, CBE. A Deputy Chairman and managing director, British Petroleum Co. Ltd.
- Francis William Walker, CBE, JP. For political and public services in Inverness-shire.
- Maurice Gordon Whittome, CB, Solicitor, Board of Customs and Excise.
- Captain James Paton Younger, CBE. For public services in Scotland. Lord Lieutenant, County of Clackmannan.

State of Victoria

- Robert Rutherford Blackwood, General Manager, Dunlop Rubber Co. (Australia), for services to the University of Melbourne, State of Victoria.
- Major-General Alan Hollick Ramsay, CB, CBE, DSO, ED, formerly Director of Education, State of Victoria.

State of Queensland

- Thomas Reginald Groom, Lord Mayor of Brisbane, State of Queensland.
- David John Muir, CMG, Agent-General in London for the State of Queensland.

State of South Australia

- Edward Waterfield Hayward, Chairman of The St. John Council for the State of South Australia.
- Reginald Francis Matters, VRD, MD, MS, a leading Gynaecologist in the State of South Australia.

State of Western Australia

- Henry Rudolph Howard, Lord Mayor of the City of Perth, State of Western Australia.

Commonwealth Relations

- Henry Morton Leech Williams, MBE, President of the Bengal Chamber of Commerce and Industry and of the Associated Chambers of Commerce of India.

Overseas Territories

- Charles Rudolph Campbell, CBE, chairman, Public Service Commission, Jamaica.
- Ralph Abercromby Campbell, Chief Justice, Bahamas.
- Trevor Jack Gould, Justice of Appeal, Court of Appeal for Eastern Africa.
- Patrick Hobson. For public services in Trinidad.
- Clifford de Lisle Inniss, Chief Justice, British Honduras.
- Joseph Patron, OBE, MC, JP, Speaker of the Legislative Council, Gibraltar.
- Henry James Tucker, CBE. For public services in Bermuda.
- Michael William Turner, CBE, JP. For public services in Hong Kong.

=== Order of the Bath ===
==== Knight Grand Cross of the Order of the Bath (GCB) ====
Military Division

- Admiral Sir John Peter Lorne Reid, KCB, CVO.
- General Sir Richard Amyatt Hull, KCB, DSO, (36442), late Royal Armoured Corps.

==== Knight Commander of the Order of the Bath (KCB) ====
Military Division

- Vice-Admiral Sir Charles Edward Madden, Bt, CB.
- Vice-Admiral Royston Hollis Wright, CB, DSC.
- Lieutenant-General Richard Neville Anderson, CB, CBE, DSO, (38648), late Infantry Colonel, The King's Own Royal Border Regiment, Colonel, 10th Princess Mary's Own Gurkha Rifles.
- Lieutenant-General William Gregory Huddleston Pike, CB, CBE, DSO, (31590), late Royal Regiment of Artillery.
- Air Marshal Ronald Beresford Lees, CB, CBE, DFC, Royal Air Force.

Civil Division

- Sir Charles Craik Cunningham, KBE, CB, CVO, Permanent Under-Secretary of State, Home Office.
- Bruce Donald Fraser, CB, Permanent Secretary, Ministry of Health.

==== Companion of the Order of the Bath (CB) ====
Military Division

Royal Navy

- Rear-Admiral Talbot Leadam Eddison, DSC.
- Rear-Admiral John Byng Frewen.
- Rear-Admiral Derick Henry Fellowes Hetherington, DSC.
- Rear-Admiral Arthur Richard Hezlet, DSO, DSC.
- Rear-Admiral Frank Henry Edward Hopkins, DSO, DSC.
- Rear-Admiral Vernon St Clair Lane Magniac.
- Rear-Admiral Charles Bernard Pratt.
- Rear-Admiral Arthur Allison FitzRoy Talbot, DSO.
- Rear Admiral Wilfred Geoffrey Stuart Tighe.

Army

- Major-General Henry Templer Alexander, CBE, DSO, (52569), late Infantry.
- Major-General Walter Arthur George Burns, DSO, OBE, MC, (50398), late Foot Guards.
- Major-General Hamish Manus Campbell, CBE, (38852), Royal Army Pay Corps.
- Major-General Claude Ian Hurley Dunbar, CBE, DSO, (41098), late Foot Guards.
- Major-General Geoffrey Richard Desmond Fitzpatrick, DSO, MBE, MC, (53670), late Royal Armoured Corps.
- Major-General Norman Leslie Foster, DSO, (44079), late Royal Regiment of Artillery.
- Major-General Desmond Spencer Gordon, CBE, DSO, (50906), late Infantry.
- Major-General Charles Henry Pepys Harington, CBE, DSO, MC, (44880), late Infantry.
- Major-General The Right Honourable Henry Charles, Baron Thurlow, CBE, DSO, (47526), late Infantry.

Royal Air Force

- Air Vice Marshal Charles Broughton, CBE.
- Air Vice Marshal Brian Kenyon Burnett, DFC, AFC.
- Air Vice Marshal Christopher Harold Hartley, CBE, DFC, AFC.
- Air Vice Marshal Thomas Ulric Curzon Shirley, CBE.
- Air Vice Marshal Frederick Snowden Stapleton, DSO, DFC.
- Air Vice Marshal Peter Guy Wykeham, DSO, OBE, DFC, AFC.
- Acting Air Vice Marshal Bernard Albert Chacksfield, OBE.
- Air Commodore Walter MacIan King, CBE.

Civil Division

- Robert Burns, CMG, Under-Secretary, Ministry of Aviation.
- Neville Marriott Goodman, MD, FRCP, Deputy Chief Medical Officer, Ministry of Health.
- Norman William Graham, Under-Secretary, Department of Health for Scotland.
- Anthony Henry Jeffreys, Clerk Assistant of the Parliaments.
- Philip Staniforth Newell, Under-secretary, Admiralty.
- Anthony Percivall Pott, Chief Architect, Ministry of Education.
- Sydney Redman, Assistant Under-Secretary of State, War Office.
- Matthew Stevenson, CMG, Under-secretary, HM Treasury.
- Henry Forbes Summers, Under-Secretary, Ministry of Housing and Local Government.
- Reginald Cockroft Sutcliffe, OBE, Chief Scientific Officer, Meteorological Office, Air Ministry.
- Mark Dalcour Tennant, CMG, Under-Secretary, Ministry of Labour.
- Ronald George Robert Wall, Under-Secretary, Ministry of Agriculture, Fisheries and Food.
- Alfred Cecil Williams, Permanent Secretary, Ministry of Education for Northern Ireland.
- Alan Wolstencroft, Director of Radio Services, General Post Office.

=== Order of Saint Michael and Saint George ===
==== Knight Grand Cross of the Order of St Michael and St George (GCMG) ====
- Sir Frederick Crawford, KCMG, OBE, Governor and Commander-in-Chief, Uganda.

==== Knight Commander of the Order of St Michael and St George (KCMG) ====
- Boris Petrovitch Uvarov, CMG, lately Director, Anti-Locust Research Centre.
- William Arthur Weir Clark, CMG, CBE, High Commissioner for the United Kingdom in Cyprus.
- Colonel Sir Henry Abel Smith, KCVO, DSO, Governor of the State of Queensland.
- John Buchanan, CMG, MD, FRCP(Ed), Medical Adviser to the Secretary of State for the Colonies.
- Isham Peter Garran, CMG, Her Majesty's Ambassador Extraordinary and Plenipotentiary in Mexico City.
- Denis Arthur Hepworth Wright, CMG, Her Majesty's Ambassador Extraordinary and Plenipotentiary in Addis Ababa.

Honorary Knight Commander

- Mohammed Ikramullah, formerly Secretary in the Ministry of Foreign Affairs and Commonwealth Relations in Pakistan.

==== Companion of the Order of St Michael and St George (CMG) ====
- Alexander Robson Bruce, OBE, United Kingdom Trade Commissioner for New South Wales.
- Grahame Richard East, Assistant Secretary, Board of Inland Revenue.
- Alexander James Kellar, OBE, Attached War Office.
- Claude Evan Loombe, Adviser to the Bank of England.
- John Ronald William Wilby, United Kingdom Trade Commissioner, Ontario.
- Thomas Johnston Buchan. For political and public services in the State of Victoria.
- Gerald William St. John Chadwick, an Assistant Under-Secretary of State in the Commonwealth Relations Office.
- George Read Fisher, chairman of the Board of Directors, Mount Isa Mines Pty Ltd., State of Queensland.
- Albert Millin, CBE, in recognition of his long service to the European Advisory Council, Swaziland.
- William Shearer Philip, MC, President of the Board of Management, Alfred Hospital, Melbourne, State of Victoria.
- John Orde Poynton, MD, Director of the Institute of Medical and Veterinary Science, State of South Australia.
- Cecil Majella Sheridan, Attorney-General, Federation of Malaya.
- Herbert Louis Adams, TD, Chief Administrative Officer, East Africa High Commission.
- The Most Reverend Leonard James Beecher, Lord Archbishop of East Africa.
- George Trafford Bell, OBE, Provincial Commissioner, Lake Province, Tanganyika.
- Eric Raymond Bevington, Financial Secretary, Fiji.
- Howard William Davidson, MBE, Financial Secretary, North Borneo.
- Murray Graeme Dickson, Director of Education, Sarawak.
- George Foggon, OBE, Labour Adviser to the Secretary of State for the Colonies.
- Robert Sidney Foster, Chief Secretary, Nyasaland.
- Charles Thomas Henfrey, lately Chief Engineer, East African Railways and Harbours.
- Humphrey Lloyd Jones, Administrative Secretary to the Government, Northern Rhodesia.
- Charles Innes Meek, Permanent Secretary, Prime Minister's Office, Tanganyika.
- Alasdair Francis MacKenzie, Federal Agricultural Adviser, The West Indies.
- The Right Honourable Julian Edward George, Earl of Oxford and Asquith, Administrator of St. Lucia.
- Geoffrey Studholme Wilson, Commissioner of Police, Tanganyika.
- Ronald William Bailey, Chargé d'Affaires, Her Majesty's Legation, Taiz.
- Dudley John Cheke, Foreign Office.
- Henry Charles Hainworth, Foreign Office.
- Arthur Henry Macnamara Hillis, Minister (Treasury Adviser), United Kingdom Mission to the United Nations, New York.
- Donald Charles Hopson, DSO, MC, TD, Foreign Office.
- Charles Andrew Buchanan King, MBE, Foreign Office.
- The Most Reverend Angus Campbell MacInnes, Archbishop in Jerusalem.
- William Bernard Malley, CBE, Counsellor, Her Majesty's Embassy, Madrid.
- Ellis Morgan, Foreign Office.
- Michael Antony Moyse Robb, Foreign Office.
- James Smith Rooke, OBE, Counsellor (Commercial), Her Majesty's Embassy, Berne.
- Ralph Walford Selby, Counsellor, Her Majesty's Embassy, Copenhagen.

=== Royal Victorian Order ===
==== Knight Commander of the Royal Victorian Order (KCVO) ====
- The Right Honourable Alexander Francis St Vincent Baring, Baron Ashburton.
- Sir Charles William Dixon, KCMG, OBE.
- Basil Smallpeice.

==== Commander of the Royal Victorian Order (CVO) ====
- Colonel Sir Bartle Mordaunt Marsham Edwards, MC.
- Captain North Edward Frederick Dalrymple-Hamilton, MVO, MBE, DSC, Royal Navy.
- John Angus Macbeth Mitchell, MC.
- Aubrey John Toppin, MVO.
- Douglas Edward Webb, OBE.

==== Member of the Royal Victorian Order (MVO) ====
At this time the two lowest classes of the Royal Victorian Order were "Member (fourth class)" and "Member (fifth class)", both with post-nominal letters MVO. "Member (fourth class)" was renamed "Lieutenant" (LVO) from the 1985 New Year Honours onwards.

Fourth Class

- William Harry Gabb.
- William d'Auvergne Maycock, MBE, MD, MRCS.
- Major William Frederick Richardson, The Queen's Own Hussars.
- Leonard Roodyn, MD.
- Lieutenant (S) Robert Thompson, MVO, Royal Navy (Retd).
- Richard Preston Graham-Vivian, MC.
- Robert Christopher Mackworth Mackworth-Young.

Fifth Class

- Ione Elizabeth Jane Eadie.
- John Henry James Hunt.
- Lieutenant (S) George Arthur Alfred Kingswell, Royal Navy (Retd).
- William Thomas Lovegrove.
- John William McNelly.

=== Order of the British Empire ===
==== Dame Grand Cross of the Order of the British Empire (GBE) ====
Civil Division

- Dame Evelyn Adelaide Sharp, DBE, Permanent Secretary, Ministry of Housing and Local Government.

==== Knight Grand Cross of the Order of the British Empire (GBE) ====
Civil Division

- Sir Ivan Arthur Rice Stedeford, KBE, chairman and managing director, Tube Investments Ltd., chairman, Advisory Group on the British Transport Commission.
- Sir Reginald James Bowker, KCMG, Her Majesty's Ambassador Extraordinary and Plenipotentiary in Vienna.

==== Dame Commander of the Order of the British Empire (DBE) ====
Military Division

- Air Commandant Anne Stephens, MBE, ADC, Women's Royal Air Force.

==== Knight Commander of the Order of the British Empire (KBE) ====
Military Division

- Vice-Admiral Nicholas Alfred Copeman, CB, DSC.
- Rear-Admiral Kenneth Robertson Buckley.
- Major-General Rohan Delacombe, CB, CBE, DSO, (34748), late Infantry Colonel, The Royal Scots (The Royal Regiment).
- Acting Air Marshal John Grandy, CB, DSO, Royal Air Force.

Civil Division

- William Forbes Arbuckle, CB, Secretary, Scottish Education Department.
- Sir Lawrence Edwards, OBE, JP, DL, chairman and managing director, Middle Docks and Engineering Co. Ltd., South Shields.
- Sir Charles Joseph William Harris, CBE, Private Secretary to the Parliamentary Secretary, HM Treasury.
- Isaac James Pitman, MP, Member of Parliament for Bath since 1945. For political and public services.
- Alan Alves Dudley, CMG, Minister and Adviser for Economic and Social Affairs, United Kingdom Mission to the United Nations, New York.
- Robert Hugh Maxwell, OBE, British subject resident in Greece.
- Anthony Bernard Killick, CMG, Minister of Natural Resources, Uganda.

==== Commander of the Order of the British Empire (CBE) ====
Military Division

Royal Navy

- Commodore Lionel William Lendon Argles, DSC.
- Captain Eric Cutts Beard.
- Captain Hugo Hastings Bracken.
- Commodore Charles Patrick Cay Noble, DSC, VRD, Royal Naval Reserve.
- Surgeon-Captain William James Meredith Sadler, QHS, MRCS, LRCP.
- Captain Leigh Edward Delves Walthall, DSC.
- Captain Anthony Woodifield, MVO.

Army

- Brigadier Robert Angus Graham Binny, OBE, (47026), late Corps of Royal Engineers.
- Brigadier David Arthur Kennedy William Block, DSO, MC, (39142), late Royal Regiment of Artillery (now R.A.R.O).
- Brigadier (temporary) Gerard Peter Hilton Boycott (41065), late Corps of Royal Engineers.
- Colonel Vincent Alexander Prideaux Budge, MVO, OBE, (62571), late Foot Guards.
- Brigadier (temporary) Desmond Alexander Bruce Clarke, OBE, (53615), late Royal Regiment of Artillery.
- Colonel Leonard Young Gibson, MBE, TD, (58464), Staff, Territorial Army.
- Brigadier (temporary) George Henry Wallis Goode, DSO, OBE, (51936), late Infantry.
- Brigadier Lewis John Harris, OBE, (47557), late Corps of Royal Engineers.
- Colonel (temporary) Arthur Thomas John Heyden, MBE, (265764), Corps of Royal Engineers.
- Brigadier (temporary) Alan Neilson Moon, LDS, (40175), late Royal Army Dental Corps.
- Brigadier Marshall St John Oswald, DSO, MC, (52667), late Royal Regiment of Artillery.
- Brigadier Francis James Claude Piggott, DSO, OBE, (49931), late Infantry.
- Brigadier (temporary) John Sheffield (47645), Royal Army Ordnance Corps.
- Brigadier (temporary) George Wort (50967), late Infantry.
- Brigadier Maris Theo Young, DSO, OBE, (41188), late Royal Regiment of Artillery.
- Brigadier (temporary) Henry James Lindsay Green (50867), late Foot Guards, formerly on loan to the Government of the Federation of Malaya.
- Brigadier (temporary) Thomas Haddon, OBE, (58141), late Infantry, Brigade Commander and Commandant, Singapore Military Forces.

Royal Air Force

- Air Commodore Richard Cecil Ayling, OBE.
- Air Commodore Evelyn Michael Thomas Howell.
- Air Commodore George Henry Morley, OBE, QHS, FRCS, LRCP.
- Acting Air Commodore Denis Graham Smallwood, DSO, MBE, DFC, ADC.
- Group Captain John Barraclough, DFC, AFC.
- Group Captain Robert Thomas Frogley, OBE, DFC.
- Group Captain Ian Douglas Napier Lawson, DFC.
- Group Captain Angus Archibald Norman Nicholson.
- Group Captain Arthur Maxwell Ruston, DFC.
- Group Captain Thomas Peter Seymour.
- Group Captain Irving Stanley Smith, OBE, DFC.

Civil Division

- Maurice Barber, JP, Joint Managing Director, W. H. & J. Barber Ltd.
- Charles Frederick Barnard, Executive Vice-chairman, Mirrlees, Bickerton and Day Ltd.
- George Basil Thomas Barr, Assistant Legal Adviser, Home Office.
- Walter John Beach, Director of Audit, Exchequer and Audit Department.
- Reginald Edwin Beales, deputy director, Central Statistical Office, Cabinet Office.
- Alderman William Henry Chatterley Bishop. For political and public services in Exeter.
- Herbert Archbold Brechin, OBE. For political and public services, in Scotland.
- William Lindsay Burns, chairman, Henry Balfour & Co. Ltd.
- Nora Chadwick. For services to the study of early literature.
- Lieutenant-Colonel Robert Macgowan Chapman, TD, DL. For political and public services in the North of England.
- Selkirk Chapman, Director, Association of Chemical and Allied Employers.
- John Melville Clarke, Inspector General, Bankruptcy and Companies Liquidation Headquarters, Board of Trade.
- Douglas Freeman Coutts, Registrar, West London and Wandsworth County Courts.
- Captain Reginald Ernest Cowell, RD, Royal Naval Reserve (Retd); Marine Superintendent, Peninsular and Oriental Steam Navigation Company.
- The Very Reverend Kevin Patrick Cronin, Principal, St. Mary's College, Twickenham.
- Desmond Curran, MB, FRCP, Senior Psychiatrist, St. George's Hospital, London.
- The Right Honourable Edward Richard Assheton Penn, The Viscount Curzon, JP, DL. For political and public services in Buckinghamshire.
- James Naughton Dandie, MC, President, Law Society of Scotland.
- Arthur Dean, Assistant General Manager, North Eastern Region, York, British Railways.
- Captain Charles Frederick Elsey, MC. For services to Horse Racing.
- William Albert Fairhurst, Senior Partner, F. A. Macdonald & Partners, Consulting Engineers.
- Alderman Katharine Margaret Fletcher, chairman, Lancashire Education Committee.
- William Lancelot Francis, Director (Grants and Information), Headquarters, Department of Scientific and Industrial Research.
- Helen Margaret, The Honourable Lady Gibbs. Lately Chief Commissioner for Overseas Territories, Girl Guides Association.
- Andrew Rae Gilchrist, MD, FRCP(Ed), Physician and Consultant in Cardiology, Edinburgh Royal Infirmary.
- Francis George Gillard, OBE, Controller, West Region, British Broadcasting Corporation.
- Geoffrey Chapman Godber, Clerk, Shropshire County Council Chairman, Society of Clerks of the Peace.
- James Wyllie Gregor, Director, Scottish Society for Research in Plant Breeding.
- John Grierson. For services to documentary films. Member of the Films of Scotland Committee.
- Llewelyn Wyn Griffith, OBE, Vice-chairman, Arts Council of Great Britain.
- John Edward Harris, Professor of Zoology, University of Bristol.
- Evan Llewelyn Harry, OBE, Regional Director, South Western Region, Ministry of Agriculture, Fisheries and Food.
- Alderman Thomas Harold Ives. For political and public services in the West Riding of Yorkshire.
- Harold Cottam Johnson, OBE, Deputy Keeper and Secretary, Public Record Office.
- Donald Henry Kendon, chairman, Merseyside and North Wales Electricity Board.
- William Robert Knox, MBE, MM, JP. For public services in Northern Ireland.
- William Daniel Lacey, County Architect, Nottinghamshire County Council.
- Arnold Frank Lampitt, JP, managing director, Telephone Cables Ltd., Dagenham, Essex.
- Edgar Ernest Lawley, chairman, Board of Governors, St Mary's Hospital, London.
- Lieutenant-Colonel Thomas Moncrieff Lawrie, TD, chairman, Scottish Group Committee, and vice-chairman, National Council and National Executive Committee, National Association of Port Employers.
- Captain Edward Kirby Le Mesurier, MVO, Royal Navy (Retd); Secretary, National Rifle Association.
- Alderman Mary Dorothy Lewis, OBE, JP. Lately Lord Mayor of Cardiff.
- Douglas Moul McIntosh, Director of Education, Fife.
- Henry George Mason, JP, Alderman, Plymouth Chairman, Planning Committee, Association of Municipal Corporations.
- John George Mathieson, MC, Convener, Argyll County Council.
- Stanley Mehew, OBE, County Surveyor, Derbyshire.
- John Chassar Moir, MD, FRCS, Nuffield Professor of Obstetrics and Gynaecology, University of Oxford.
- Henry Donald Moore. For political services.
- Millicent Morris. For political and public services in Leicester.
- Harold Alfred Needham, Commissioner and Director of Examinations, Civil Service Commission.
- Leslie Faithfull Cyril Northcott, Principal Superintendent, Materials and Explosives Division, Armament Research and Development Establishment, War Office.
- Ernest Norton, BEM, Research Director, Yarrow & Company Limited, Glasgow,
- Bertie Edgar Orren, deputy director of Naval Contracts, Admiralty.
- Frederick William Page, Director and Chief Executive, Aircraft Division, English Electric Aviation Ltd.
- Josiah Dawe Parsons, Director, Royal Ordnance Factories (Explosives), War Office.
- William Henry Penley, Deputy Chief Scientific Officer, Royal Radar Establishment, Ministry of Aviation.
- Frederick Hugh Dalzel Pritchard, Secretary General, British Red Cross Society.
- Alderman Arthur Samuel Rickwood, MBE, Farmer, Isle of Ely.
- Charles Arthur Risbridger, Chief Engineer, City of Birmingham Water Department.
- The Honourable Irene Phyllis Rose. For political and public services in London.
- George Humphrey Wolferstan Rylands, Fellow of King's College, University of Cambridge. For services to English drama.
- Julius Victor Scholderer. Lately Deputy Keeper, British Museum.
- Norman Halifax Searby, Manager, Guided Weapons Department, Ferranti Ltd., Manchester.
- Lieutenant-Colonel Samuel Shaverin, OBE, chairman, Leyton, Walthamstow and District War Pensions Committee.
- Philip Smiles, OBE, DL. For political and public services in Belfast.
- Leslie Middleton Smith, Assistant Secretary, Ministry of Works.
- The Venerable Oswin Harvard Gibbs-Smith, Archdeacon of London.
- Group Captain Vincent John Sofiano, MBE, Principal Executive Officer, Foreign Office.
- Joanna Miriam Spencer, Assistant Secretary, Ministry of Power.
- Edmond Painter Stacpoole, Parliamentary Lobby Correspondent, Press Association.
- Richard Sugden, TD, managing director, Thomas Sugden & Son Ltd., Brighouse, Yorkshire.
- Herbert Whitton Sumsion, Organist of Gloucester Cathedral.
- Joan Alston Sutherland, Singer.
- Stanley Cecil Sutton, Keeper of the Indian Records, Commonwealth Relations Office.
- Alexander Burt Taylor, Registrar-General, Scotland.
- George William Hughes Townsend, MB, BCh, County Medical Officer and Chief Welfare Officer, Buckinghamshire County Council.
- Alderman David Morris Tudor. Lately Chairman, Merionethshire Agricultural Executive Committee.
- Roberts Sharpe Venters, MB, FRCS(Ed), chairman, Special Area Committee, Newcastle Regional Hospital Board.
- John Wainwright, JP. For political and public services in Lancashire.
- Colonel Ronald Draycott Sherbrooke-Walker, TD, DL, Vice-chairman, Army Cadet Force Association.
- Alderman Sarah Adelaide Ward, OBE. For political and public services in Staffordshire.
- Cecil Haydn Watkins, Chief Constable, Glamorgan Constabulary.
- Alderman John Serrell Watts, JP. For political and public services in Essex.
- Carel Victor Morlais Weight, Painter. Professor of the Painting School, Royal College of Art.
- William John Welford, chairman, British Egg Marketing Board.
- George Allan Whipple, chairman and managing director, Hilger & Watts Ltd.
- Frederic Calland Williams, OBE, Professor of Electrical Engineering, University of Manchester.
- Richard Lloyd Joseph Wills, MC, managing director, George Wills & Sons Ltd., Export-Import Merchants.
- Colonel John Wallace Guy Bowden, Military Attaché, Her Majesty's Embassy, Baghdad.
- Albert Andrew Ernst Franklin, OBE, Her Majesty's Consul-General, Düsseldorf.
- Geoffrey Maberly Hancock, OBE, lately Adviser to the Ruler of Qatar.
- John Sheridan Hickey, Legal Adviser to Her Majesty's Embassy, Paris.
- William Edmund Devereux Massey, MBE, Her Majesty's Ambassador Extraordinary and Plenipotentiary in Managua.
- Ayrton John Seaton Pullan, Her Majesty's Consul-General, Oporto.
- Paul Scott Rankine, Counsellor, Her Majesty's Embassy, Washington.
- Otto Frederick Reichwald, British subject lately resident in Switzerland.
- Richard Shaw, British subject resident in Indonesia.
- Horace Lindsay Rowe Bedggood, President of the Board of Management, Adult Deaf and Dumb Society, State of Victoria.
- Paul Wilson Brand, FRCS, Principal of the Christian Medical College and Hospital, Vellore, South India.
- Albert Ernest Clare, formerly Principal Architect, Public Works Department, State of Western Australia.
- Harold Carsdale Finkle, Director of Native Education, Southern Rhodesia.
- Ronald Geddes, formerly Comptroller-General of Income Tax, Federation of Malaya.
- Arthur William Goode, ED, formerly managing director, Dunlop (Malayan) Estates Ltd. For services to United Kingdom interests in the Federation of Malaya.
- Gordon Matthews Hector, OBE, Deputy Resident Commissioner and Government Secretary, Basutoland.
- Thomas Eames Hughes, Permanent Secretary, Ministry of Education, Federation of Malaya.
- Ada Victoria, Lady Knox. For social welfare services in the Ferntree Gully area of the State of Victoria.
- John Joseph Power, DSO, MB, ChM, a prominent Surgeon of, Brisbane, State of Queensland.
- His Honour Judge Jack Harvey Prior, President of the Branch in the State of New South Wales of the Royal Life Saving Society of Australia.
- Henry Beaufort Somerset, managing director, Associated Pulp & Paper Mills Ltd., Burnie, State of Tasmania.
- Clive Wentworth Uhr, MB, ChM, of Clayfield, State of Queensland. For services to charitable organisations.
- Hugh Dean Thomas Williamson, General Manager, Australia & New Zealand Bank Ltd. For public services in the State of Victoria.
- Harold Stanley Wyndham, Director-General of Education, State of New South Wales.
- Musa Amalemba. For public services in Kenya.
- Werner James Boos, chairman, Public Service Commission, Trinidad.
- Andrew Kerr Briant, OBE, Director of Agriculture, Zanzibar.
- Walter Edward Curtis, OBE, Head of Stores Department, Crown Agents for Oversea Governments and Administrations.
- Marie Hilda Stevenson-Delhomme, LRCP, LRCS. For public services in Seychelles.
- Seiyid Muhammad Abduh Ghanem, MBE, Director of Education, Aden.
- William Nelson Henry. For public services in Jamaica.
- Frank Laurence Lane, JP. For public services in Singapore.
- Yusufu Kironde Lule, formerly Minister of Education and Social Development, Uganda.
- Louis Pierre Rene Maingard De La Ville-Esoffrans. For public services in Mauritius.
- The Right Reverend Peter Rogan, OBE, Bishop of Buéa, Southern Cameroons.
- Charles Herbert St. John, MB, BS. For public services in Barbados.
- Hugh Worrell Springer, OBE, Registrar, University College of The West Indies.
- William Hart Sweeting, Receiver-General and Treasurer, Bahamas.
- James Kerr Watson, OBE, Permanent Secretary to the Ministry of Works and Engineer-in-Chief, Uganda.
- Richard George McKinnell Willan, Chief Conservator of Forests, Nyasaland.
- The Right Reverend Lucian Charles Usher-Wilson, Bishop on the Upper Nile, Uganda.

==== Officer of the Order of the British Empire (OBE) ====
Military Division

Royal Navy

- Commander Trevor Agar Beet.
- Captain Ronald John Berry, (Retd), lately on loan to the Government of India.
- Commander John Richard Broadhurst.
- Lieutenant Colonel John Colmslie Cairncross, Royal Marines (Retd).
- Surgeon Commander Edward Sidney Elliott, MRCS, LRCP.
- Commander Oliver Fogg-Elliot, (Retd).
- Commander Charles Henry Anslow Harper.
- Shipwright Commander Cyril Tuxford Haynes, MBE.
- Instructor Commander Percy Frank Kingswood, (Retd).
- Commander Andrew Cormac Mahony.
- Commander Thomas Orr.
- Acting Captain Robert Gordon Brabazon O'Neil Roe.
- Captain Ernest Charles Rogers, Royal Fleet Auxiliary Service (Retd).
- Commander Maurice Amedee Tash.
- Commander Peter Alastair Titheridge, VRD, Royal Naval Reserve.
- The Reverend Donald Leighton Webster, Chaplain.

Army

- Lieutenant-Coloner(temporary) Tony Adlington (202507), Royal Army Ordnance Corps.
- Lieutenant-Colonel Bertram Stuart Trevelyan Archer, GC, ERD, (126305), Corps of Royal Engineers, Army Emergency Reserve.
- Lieutenant-Colonel William Edward Iredale Armstrong, TD, (234712), Corps of Royal Electrical and Mechanical Engineers, Territorial Army.
- Lieutenant-Colonel Donald Royle Jackson Bancroft (69171), The King's Shropshire Light Infantry.
- Lieutenant-Colonel Harry FitzGibbon Boswell (72790), Corps of Royal Engineers.
- Lieutenant-Colonel John Digby Templeton Brett (77579), Royal Corps of Signals.
- Lieutenant-Colonel William Arthur Cavendish Carter (73013), Royal Regiment of Artillery (Employed List 1).
- Lieutenant-Colonel Richard Francis Coles, MBE, (99799), The Duke of Edinburgh's Royal Regiment (Berkshire and Wiltshire) (Employed List 1).
- Lieutenant-Colonel (Staff Quartermaster) Arthur St. George Cuff (104933), Employed List 2 (now retired).
- Lieutenant-Colonel Owen James Degnan (113302), Royal Army Service Corps.
- Lieutenant-Colonel Ferdinand Shaw Eiloart (72433), Royal Regiment of Artillery.
- Lieutenant-Colonel Edward Ronald Hill (380249), 7th Duke of Edinburgh's Own Gurkha Rifles.
- Lieutenant-Colonel (temporary) Arthur Gwynne Jones, MC, (156400), The South Wales Borderers.
- Lieutenant-Colonel (now Colonel (temporary)) Anthony James Arengo Arengo-Jones, MBE, (67137), The Gloucestershire Regiment (Employed List 1).
- Lieutenant-Colonel Francis Robert Newsum Kerr, MC, (66376), The Royal Scots (The Royal Regiment), Territorial Army.
- Lieutenant-Colonel (temporary) Alexander Reginald Kettles, MBE, MC, (126153), The Cameronians (Scottish Rifles).
- Lieutenant-Colonel Charles Patrick Baillie Knight, MBE, (122767), Army Legal Services Staff List.
- Lieutenant-Colonel Richard Henry Fenn Laxen (231852), Corps of Royal Electrical and Mechanical Engineers.
- Lieutenant-Colonel Leigh Maxwell (67006), Intelligence Corps.
- Lieutenant-Colonel (temporary) William McNinch, DFC, (162183), Royal Regiment of Artillery, attached Army Air Corps.
- Lieutenant-Colonel Arthur John Michelson, MBE, LDS, (263338), Royal Army Dental Corps.
- Lieutenant-Colonel Neil Malcolm Roland Moody (129877), Royal Regiment of Artillery, Territorial Army.
- Lieutenant-Colonel (acting) Grahame Wilshaw Parker, MBE, TD, (79163), Combined Cadet Force.
- Lieutenant-Colonel John Hugh Warwick-Pengelly (149241), The Cheshire Regiment (Employed List 1).
- Lieutenant-Colonel (Quartermaster) Bernard Henry Pratt, MBE, (216767), Grenadier Guards (now retired).
- Lieutenant-Colonel (Quartermaster) Edward Martin Richardson, MBE, (135519), Corps of Royal Engineers (Employed List 2x) (now retired).
- Lieutenant-Colonel William Alleyne Robinson (74601), The King's Own Royal Border Regiment.
- Lieutenant-Colonel Stephen Murfin Rose, MBE, (67108), The Royal Fusiliers (City of London Regiment) (Employed List 1).
- Lieutenant-Colonel Robert Alexander Simpson (71308), 16th/5th The Queen's Royal Lancers, Royal Armoured Corps.
- Lieutenant-Colonel (local Colonel) John Duncan Sturrock, MBE, (65433), Corps of Royal Engineers.
- Lieutenant-Colonel Peter Laurence Badham-Thornhill (66029), Royal Regiment of Artillery.
- Lieutenant-Colonel Mervyn William David Williams (71583), Royal Regiment of Artillery.
- Lieutenant-Colonel Geoffrey Thompson Anderson, MC, (56988), The Cheshire Regiment (Employed List 1), on loan to the Government of Ghana.
- Lieutenant-Colonel Allan MacDonald Gilmour, MC, (63976), Queen's Own Highlanders (Seaforth and Camerons) (Employed List 1), on loan to the Government of Ghana.
- Lieutenant-Colonel Neil William Ramsay (166554), Corps of Royal Engineers, on loan to the Government of Ghana.
- Commandant Trevor James, National Guard, Western Aden Protectorate.

Royal Air Force

- Wing Commander Gilbert Morris Beer (75924).
- Wing Commander John Ivan Roy Bowring, MBE, (54547).
- Wing Commander Morris Driscoll (49166).
- Wing Commander Ronald Cyril Everson, AFC, (52030).
- Wing Commander Charles Melvin Gibbs, DFC, (58844).
- Wing Commander Michael Finch Hatton, (48699).
- Wing Commander John Thornett Lawrence, AFC, (104428).
- Wing Officer Bridget Grace Martin (1242), Women's Royal Air Force.
- Wing Commander Edward Hutchings Roberts, MBE, (76494), (Retd).
- Wing Commander Clive King Saxelby, DFC, AFC, (36275).
- Wing Commander James Patrick Spillane (50174).
- Wing Commander Gordon James Storey, AFC, (155051).
- Wing Commander Peter Henry Waterkeyn, DFC, (108006).
- Acting Wing Commander William Anderson Beaumont (166709), Royal Auxiliary Air Force.
- Acting Wing Commander Michael Jones (119566).
- Acting Wing Commander Donald Frank Perrens, DSO, DFC, (47493), Royal Auxiliary Air Force.
- Acting Wing Commander John Cameron Robertson (2600196), Royal Auxiliary Air Force.
- Acting Wing Commander Edward Henry Harcourt Stenning (69012), Royal Air Force Volunteer Reserve (Training Branch).
- Squadron Leader David Ivor Fryer, MB, (502222).
- Squadron Leader Edward Guy Ashley Hart (56156).

Civil Division

- Edward John Ashman, Assistant Controller of Death Duties, Board of Inland Revenue.
- Nigel Sydney William Ashwanden, Deputy Regional Controller, London and South Eastern Region, Board of Trade.
- James Bramston Austin, JP. For political and public services in Essex.
- William Richard Balkwill, assistant director of Victualling, Admiralty.
- Margaret Fotherley Barrett, MBE, Vice-chairman, Birmingham Savings Committee.
- Albert Edward Barwood, Alderman, Cheshire County Council and Macclesfield Borough Council.
- Ralph Marshall Bates, FRCS, LRCP, Medical Superintendent, Royal Eastern Counties Hospital.
- Reginald Henry Bates, MBE, President, British Cast Concrete Federation.
- Professor Arthur Beacham, chairman, Mid-Wales Industrial Development Association.
- Frederick William Beavan, Senior Chief Executive Officer, Ministry of Pensions and National Insurance.
- Dora Behrens, MBE, JP, Vice-chairman, Bradford Savings Committee.
- Anne Shentall Bettenson, HM Superintending Inspector of Factories, Ministry of Labour.
- John Godfrey Protheroe-Beynon. For political and public services in Carmarthenshire.
- Lieutenant-Commander Herbert Burcham Binks, DSC, Royal Navy (Retd), General Secretary, Royal Naval Benevolent Trust.
- The Reverend Peter John Blake, Superior, Loyola Hall, Liverpool.
- Lawrence Smith Blanche, JP. For political and public services in Glasgow.
- Percy Charles Bolam, Principal Inspector of Taxes, Board of Inland Revenue.
- William Geoffrey Boss, Principal, Colonial Office.
- Margaret Stole Glen Bott, MRCS, FRCOG, JP. For public services in Nottingham.
- William Harry Bowering, Senior Partner, Bowefing, Duffield & Co. Adelaide United Kingdom Trade Correspondent in South Australia.
- Major George Boyce, MBE, MC, JP, DL, chairman, Amersham Rural District Council.
- Charles Sidney Bradshaw, BEM, Superintending Engineer, War Office.
- Alderman William John Bray, chairman, County Education Committee, Herefordshire.
- Mary Margaret Brickhill. For political and public services in Cheshire.
- Frank Briers, Principal, Norwich City College and Art School.
- Kenneth Henry Brill, Children's Officer, Devon.
- William James Brown, Director, Atomic Weapons Production, Ministry of Aviation.
- Carrol Crossley John Bullough, chairman, Agricultural Lime Producers' Council.
- Neil Campbell. Lately President, Scottish Amateur Athletic Association.
- Arthur Edwin George Carey, Electrical Engineer, Admiralty.
- Cecil Ernest Carey, Chemical Products Manager, South Eastern Gas Board.
- Gwendolen Cartwright, Statistician, Agricultural Economics Division, Ministry of Agriculture, Fisheries and Food.
- Mercia Evelyn Castle, JP. For political and public services in Bristol.
- John William Edmund Cathcart, Principal Officer, Ministry of Home Affairs for Northern Ireland.
- Leonard Frank Cheyney, Secretary, Institute of Municipal Treasurers and Accountants.
- George Leopold Albert Coates, Engineer I, Military Engineering Experimental Establishment, Christchurch, War Office.
- Kathleen Norah Coates, Principal, Home Office.
- Alderman John Veasy Collier, JP. For political and public services in Northampton.
- The Right Honourable Kathleen Myrtle, The Dowager Viscountess Colville of Culross. Lately Chief Commissioner for Scotland, Girl Guides Association.
- Margaret Clara Patricia Crane, Deputy President, Shropshire Branch, British Red Cross Society.
- Nancy, The Lady Crathorne. For public services, chiefly in Yorkshire.
- David Lutener Gardner Crewe, Grade A III Officer, Government Communications Headquarters.
- Richard Harry Cripwell, Principal Lecturer, Didsbury Training College, Manchester.
- Acton Crisswell, Deputy Regional Director, General Post Office.
- Peter Lauderdale Daubeny, Theatrical Producer.
- Russell Henry Richard Davey, chairman, Essex River Board.
- Douglas Reginald Davidson, MBE, Secretary, National Savings Committee.
- John Brian Ramsay Davies, Principal, Ministry of Transport.
- Colonel Donald John Dean, VC, TD, JP, DL, Member, Kent Territorial and Auxiliary Forces Association.
- Herbert Frederick Kent Dearlove, Member, Mid-Essex District Advisory Committee, Eastern Regional Board for Industry.
- Captain George William Dobson, RD, Royal Naval Reserve (Retd), Master, TS Devonshire, Bibby Line Ltd., Liverpool.
- John Robert Elliot Draper. For political services in Norfolk.
- Hugo Thompson Duff, JP, chairman, County Tyrone Committee of Agriculture.
- John Ronald Dunstan, deputy chairman, Cornwall County Agricultural Executive Committee.
- Gerald William East, Controller, Valuation Branch, Board of Customs and Excise.
- Hilda Mary Eastwood, Headmistress, Bebington County Secondary School for Girls, Wirral, Cheshire.
- James Skinner Mackenzie Eddison, Headmaster, Northfield Secondary School, Aberdeen.
- Daniel Douglas Eley, Professor of Physical Chemistry, University of Nottingham.
- Charles John Lister Elwell. Attached War Office.
- Claude Scudamore Emery. Lately Sales Director, Sir W. G. Armstrong Whitworth Aircraft Ltd.
- Walter Douglas Evans, Staff Controller, North Western Region, General Post Office.
- Arthur Wallis Exell, Deputy Keeper, Department of Botany, British Museum (Natural History).
- William Fallowfield, Secretary, Rugby Football League.
- Helga Isabel Hope Feiling, Vice-chairman, South West Metropolitan Regional Hospital Board.
- Thomas Finney. For services to Association Football.
- Dorothea Kate Evelyn May Woodward-Fisher. For political and public services in Lewisham.
- Edward Colston-French, Head of Buying, British Broadcasting Corporation.
- Albert Gard, MBE, chairman, Plymouth, Devonport and Cornwall Trustee Savings Bank.
- Henry Gardner, JP, chairman, Kilmarnock and District Local Employment Committee.
- James Gayler, MBE, chairman, London Regional Schools Advisory Savings Sub-Committee.
- The Honourable Barbara Louisa Gibbs. For public services in Hertfordshire.
- Katharine Annis Calder Gillie, MB, BS, General Practitioner, Paddington, London.
- Henry Alexander Goddard, chairman, Management Side, and alternating chairman, Nurses and Midwives Whitley Council.
- Saul Goldblatt, Grade 2 Officer, Ministry of Labour.
- Ernest Richard Melvill Goode, Director, Advertising Division, Central Office of Information.
- William Macfarlane Gray, JP, Provost of Stirling.
- Frank Henry Green. For political services in Arundel and Shoreham.
- Alexander Ernest Hall, Trumpet Player.
- David Lowry Harbinson, MB, BCh, Medical Officer, Ministry of Health.
- William Richard Harper, Principal, Ministry of Agriculture, Fisheries and Food.
- Alan Martin Harris, Principal, War Office.
- Frederick John Hayns, First Class Valuer, Board of Inland Revenue.
- Dennis Healey, Principal Information Officer, Forestry Commission.
- Edward Alfred Hamilton-Hill, RD, Director and General Manager, Rediffusion (Malta) Ltd., Valletta Central, Malta.
- Clement Walter Godfrey Hindley, Principal, Ministry of Works.
- Joseph Frederick Hirst, Senior Principal Scientific Officer, Laboratory of the Government Chemist, Department of Scientific and Industrial Research.
- Colonel Walter Musgrave Musgrave-Hoyle, MC, TD, DL, Member, East Lancashire Territorial and Auxiliary Forces Association.
- Albert Henry Hughes, Grade 1A Officer, Foreign Office.
- William Humphrey. Lately Chairman, West Riding Agricultural Executive Committee.
- William Geoffrey Hunt, TD, Deputy Chief Mechanical Engineer, Ministry of Transport.
- Alderman James Arthur Hutchison,-Chairman, Gateshead, Chester-le-Street and District War Pensions Committee.
- Captain Frank Ernest Jackson, Senior Cargo Superintendent, Glen Line Ltd.
- Frank Hughes Johnstone, Principal, Ministry of Pensions and National Insurance.
- Maud Karpeles. For services to the study of Folk Music.
- Arthur Katz, managing director, Mettoy Co. Ltd.
- James Kelly, JP. For services to the World Council of Christian Education and Sunday School Association.
- Agnes Winifred Knight, Senior Legal Assistant, Solicitor's Department, New Scotland Yard.
- Walter Frank Knight, Ecclesiastical Goldsmith.
- Norman Davidson Laird, MB, BCh, JP. For political services in Belfast.
- Alderman Iseult Andree Legh, JP. For political and public services in Dorset.
- Joyce Scadeng Lever, JP. For political and public services in Birmingham.
- Arthur Whitaker Lowe, JP. For political and public services in Liverpool.
- Mary French McIlroy, Headmistress, Londonderry High School.
- Dorothy MacKay. For political services in Durham.
- Philip Valentine MacKinnon. For services to Yachting.
- Helen Catriona Stewart MacKintosh, Vice-chairman, Essex Anglo-American Community Relations Committee.
- Charles Stewart McLeod, Director of Industrial Relations, British Transport Commission.
- Alexander Roderick MacRae, Chief Engineer, London Airport, Air Ministry.
- Norman Major, Principal Inspector of Taxes, Board of Inland Revenue.
- Joseph Arthur Mason, Alderman, West Sussex County Council and Worthing Borough Council.
- Tom Mellor, Architect Senior lecturer in civic design, University of Liverpool.
- James Melville, Technical Manager, Vickers-Armstrongs (Shipbuilders) Ltd., Barrow-in-Furness.
- Rowland Leonard Miall, Head of Talks, Television, British Broadcasting Corporation.
- John Edwin Alfred Miles, MBE, Principal, Commonwealth Relations Office.
- Captain Douglas Rodier Miller, VRD, Royal Naval Volunteer Reserve (Retd), Scottish Area Representative Chairman of the Sea Cadet Corps.
- Sheila Allison Minto, MBE, Assistant Private Secretary to the Prime Minister.
- The Right Honourable Henry Wyndham Stanley, The Viscount Monck, JP, Vice-chairman, National Association of Boys' Clubs.
- John Percivale Moody, Producer, Welsh National Opera Company.
- The Reverend Arthur Morton, Director, National Society for the Prevention of Cruelty to Children.
- William Anderson Murray, MD, FRCP(Ed), Consultant Chest Physician, East Lothian and Borders Area.
- Gerard Benedict Newe, Secretary, Northern Ireland Council of Social Service.
- Henry Newsham, Honorary Secretary and Treasurer, National Union of Holloway Friendly Societies.
- Harry Schofield Oddie. Lately President, Institute of Builders.
- Joseph Guy Ollerenshaw, MB, ChB, General Practitioner, Skipton, Yorkshire.
- Francis Ernest Osborne. Formerly Chief Test Engineer, Rolls-Royce Ltd., Spadeadam Rocket Establishment, Cumberland, now Engineering Manager, Rolls-Royce Ltd., Lanarkshire.
- Henry Owen, Senior Chief Executive Officer, Air Ministry.
- John Thomas Owen, Headmaster, Aberaeron Secondary School.
- Observer Captain Bernard Parkes, MVO, Area Commandant, Metropolitan Area Headquarters, Royal Observer Corps.
- Edward Wynn Parry, Director and Engineering Manager, Cammell Laird & Co. Ltd.
- Eric Walter Pasold, chairman and Joint Managing Director, Pasolds Ltd., Langley, Buckinghamshire.
- Maurice Passmore, Farmer, Wormleighton, Warwickshire.
- John Leslie Phillips, Head, Reactor Division, Dounreay Experimental Reactor Establishment, United Kingdom Atomic Energy Authority.
- Edward Arthur Platt, Temporary Legal Assistant, Ministry of Agriculture, Fisheries and Food.
- Leslie Richard Westbrook Poole, Principal Examiner, Board of Trade.
- Thomas Musgrave Pyke, TD, HM Inspector of Schools, Ministry of Education.
- The Right Honourable Anne Isobel Graham, The Countess of Radnor, Member, Historic Buildings Council for England.
- Spencer William Ranger, chief executive officer, Air Ministry.
- Lewes Hector Read, President, Research Association of British Flour Millers.
- Alfred Reay, First Assistant and Deputy Chief Constable, Durham County Constabulary.
- John Redvers Reddall, Deputy Regional Controller, London (North) Region, National Assistance Board.
- William Frank Redman, Chief Officer, Swansea Fire Brigade.
- Anne Reid, JP, chairman, North Staffordshire Advisory Committee, National Assistance Board.
- Robert Denholm Reid, Head, West of Scotland Unit, Scottish Horticultural Research Institute.
- Erna Reiss, chairman, Stockport, Crewe, Northwich and Sale National Insurance Local Tribunals.
- George Edward Richardson, First Class Valuer, Board of Inland Revenue.
- Richard John Richardson, Technical Director, Brown, Lenox & Co. Ltd., Pontypridd, Glamorgan.
- William Richmond, chairman, Glasgow (Partick) National Insurance Local Tribunal.
- Clara Kathleen Riddick (Mrs. Bixley), Conductor, Surrey Philharmonic Orchestra.
- Cyril Frederick Rigby, Senior Chief Executive Officer, HM Treasury.
- James Mowat Robertson, Commodore Chief Engineer, MV Port Brisbane, Port Line Ltd., London.
- Leonard George Walker Robinson, Head Postmaster, Harrow and Wembley, Middlesex.
- Robert Sayer Rowe, Senior Partner, Perfect Lambert & Co.
- Edward Leverton Russell, Senior Principal Clerk, Companies Court, Lord Chancellor's Departments.
- Henry Charles Sansom. Lately Assistant Accountant General, Ministry of Housing and Local Government.
- Leslie Thomas Sawney, MC, chairman and managing director, Thermos Ltd.
- The Right Honourable Ivor Murray, Baron Saye and Sele, MC, DL, chairman, Oxfordshire Civil Defence Committee.
- Ernest Scott, DSO, TD, DM, BCh, General Practitioner, Ashford, Kent.
- Alan Ure Reith Scroggie, Chief Constable, Northumberland County Constabulary.
- Alison Settle. For services to the journalism of fashion.
- Patrick Shea, Principal Officer, Ministry of Finance for Northern Ireland.
- Victor Maryborough Silvester. For services to Ballroom Dancing.
- William Simm, Grade 2 Officer, Ministry of Labour.
- Daniel Joseph Skidmore, Production Director, Scottish Division, National Coal Board.
- Morris Smith, Orchestral Director, Royal Opera House, Covent Garden.
- Andrew Chalmers Smyth, JP, chairman, Angus War Pensions Committee.
- Michael Henry Ray Soper, University Demonstrator and Lecturer in Agriculture, Department of Agriculture, University of Oxford.
- Sidney George Starkey, chief executive officer, Board of Trade.
- Ernest Owen Staveley, chairman, Atherton and Tyldesley Disablement Advisory Committee.
- Oliver Winton Stebbings. For political services.
- Charles Helme Stewart, JP, Secretary and Registrar, University of Edinburgh.
- Margaret Donald Stewart, Secretary, Scottish Board, Royal College of Nursing.
- Lieutenant-Colonel George Kinnear Stobart, DL, Organising Secretary, Northern Forestry Products Ltd.
- Alfred Thomas Stokoe, Chief, Organisation and Methods Department, Cable and Wireless Ltd., London.
- Thomas Suttar, Deputy Chief Inspector of Sea Fisheries, Department of Agriculture and Fisheries for Scotland.
- Albert Howard Thomas, Chairman of three Wages Councils, Ministry of Labour.
- Richard Thomas, JP. For services to music and the arts in Swansea.
- Graham Robert Torrible, Marine Superintendent, China Navigation Co. Ltd., London.
- Commander George John Drumelzier Tweedy, Royal Navy (Retd). For political services in Edinburgh.
- William Henry Twells, Principal Ministry of Power.
- Wing Commander Edwin Harry Umbers, MBE, JP, Royal Air Force Volunteer Reserve (Retd); chairman, No. 148 (Barnsley) Squadron, Air Training Corps.
- Harold William Underbill, chairman, Central London Productivity Association.
- Richard Henry Upjohn, chairman, Leicester Industrial Savings Committee.
- Annie Eleanor Charlotte Wainwright. For political and public services in Yorkshire.
- Leslie Eustace Warner, chief executive officer, Ministry of Aviation.
- George Nicoll Watson, Principal, Scottish Home Department.
- Gilbert Forsyth Wharton, Higher Collector, London South, Board of Customs and Excise.
- Frederick Charles Wickson, chief executive officer, Royal Aircraft Establishment, Ministry of Aviation.
- Alderman Edward Williams, JP. For public services in the County of Denbigh and North Wales.
- Owen Pasley Denny Williams, Chief Maintenance Surveyor, Ministry of Works.
- Frank Wilshaw, chief executive officer, Ministry of Pensions and National Insurance.
- Sidney George Chesterman Wilson, Senior Inspector of Taxes, Board of Inland Revenue.
- William Wright, Higher Collector, Edinburgh, Board of Customs and Excise.
- William Harry Wright, Alderman, Herefordshire County Council.
- Bert Boyden Wykes, Principal Production Engineer, Admiralty.
- Bartholomew Oscar Barry, FRCS(Ed), Consultant Surgeon to Princess Tsahai Memorial Hospital, Addis Ababa.
- Maître Samuel Benattar, Legal Adviser to Her Majesty's Embassy, Tunis.
- Arthur Lancelot Craig-Bennett, British Council Representative, Libya.
- Christopher Bland, MBE, British subject resident in Iran.
- Leslie Boas, First Secretary (Information), Her Majesty's Embassy, Caracas.
- Norman Matthew Darbyshire, MBE, lately First Secretary, Political Residency, Bahrain.
- Ewan John Christian Hare, TD, First Secretary (Information), Her Majesty's Embassy, Athens.
- Ahmad Muhammad Hassan Hijazi, Judge of Her Majesty's Court, Kuwait.
- Norman Moffat Ireland, British subject resident in Colombia.
- Kenneth Ernest Hansen Light, British subject resident in Brazil.
- Neil Angus Roderick MacKay, British Council Representative, Argentina.
- Charles Sidney Palmer, MBE, Her Majesty's Consul, Cairo.
- Alan George Read, First Secretary (Labour), Her Majesty's Embassy, Tehran.
- Sven Barton Robson, British Consul, Punta Arenas.
- Alexander Sim Murray Young, British subject resident in Vietnam.
- John Frederick Barham, in recognition of his work among the coloured people of Bulawayo, Southern Rhodesia.
- William James Bishop. For services to the fruit industry, State of South Australia.
- Nicholas Gordon Boggon, a member of the Finance Committee, The Victoria League.
- Charles Keith Brown, MC, formerly Assistant Commissioner of Police, Federation of Malaya.
- William Kenneth Charlton, of Sydney, State of New South Wales. For public services.
- Henry Bernard Chubb, formerly Principal Assistant Secretary, Ministry of Internal Security, Federation of Malaya.
- Norman Arthur Findlay, of Launceston, State of Tasmania. For services to the community.
- Maurice Stanley Herring, of Hamilton, State of Queensland. For services in connection with social welfare and cultural development.
- Nigel John Nicholson Trower Hogg, a member of the United Kingdom community in Lahore, Pakistan.
- Seretse Khama, Tribal Secretary, Bamangwato Tribe, Bechuanaland Protectorate.
- Councillor Albert Keith Lines, of the Heidelberg City Council, State of Victoria. For public services.
- Thomas Robert (Noel Lothian, Director of the Adelaide Botanic Gardens, State of South Australia.
- Charles McCarron, chairman, Central Tablelands County Council, and President, Local Government Electricity Supply Association, State of New South Wales.
- Ethel Margaret McPherson, President of the council, Emily McPherson College of Domestic Economy, State of Victoria.
- Joshua Pulumo Mohapeloa, of Basutoland. For services to Sesotho music.
- Councillor Arthur William Nicholson, of the Ballaarat City Council, Chairman of the Provincial Sewerage Authorities, State of Victoria.
- Oliver Emanuel Nilsson, Chief Inspector of Technical Schools, State of Victoria.
- Reginald Edgar Peters, a member of the United Kingdom community in Bombay, India.
- Gideon Elliot Pott, MBE, Senior District Officer, Basutoland.
- Major Arthur Ivan Rice, MBE, Warden of St. Joseph's House for Boys, Southern Rhodesia.
- Colin Warneford Charles Richards, formerly Director, Telecommunications Staff College, Haripur, West Pakistan.
- Sylvia Daphne Ringrose, of Bardon, State of Queensland. For community services, especially on behalf of Girl Guides.
- Peter Herbert Setchell, State Development Officer, Perak, Federation of Malaya.
- Geoffrey Graeme Sinclair, Secretary, Country Fire Brigade, State of Victoria.
- Louis Victor Smith, MC, President, Maritime Services Board, State of New South Wales.
- Geoffrey Whitmore, formerly Commercial Engineer, Central Electricity Board, Federation of Malaya.
- Stanley Lawrence Wise, JP, of Hobart, State of Tasmania. For services to returned soldiers' organisations.
- Edith Helen Rheinallt Wynne, Chief Commissioner of the Girl Guides in Southern Rhodesia.
- Walter Edgar Young, of Newcastle, State of New South Wales. For services to the community.
- Maurice Kenneth Akker, Assistant Commissioner of Police, Kenya.
- The Reverend Father Dom Rudisend Brookes, MC, Rector of St. Edward's College, Malta.
- Datu Tuanku Bujang bin Tuanku Haji Othman, MBE, Administrative Officer, Sarawak.
- Irene Cheng, JP, Senior Education Officer, Hong Kong.
- Harry Conway, Senior Superintendent of Police, Aden.
- Roy Davies, Secretary to Government, Gilbert and Ellice Islands Colony.
- Ivo Seymour De Souza, Secretary for Migrant Services, Federation of The West Indies.
- Marc Antoine Emile Duvivier, MB, BS. For public services in Mauritius.
- Harold Francis Quinn Edwards, Chief Liaison Officer, The West Indies Central Labour Organisation, Washington.
- James Alfred Gagan, Deputy General Manager, Singapore Telephone Board.
- Arthur Wormwell Garnett, Condominium Treasurer, New Hebrides.
- Walter Gibson, Director of Marine, North Borneo.
- Alexander Michael Gregory, Director of Education, Gambia.
- Nicholas Grewal, FRCS(Ed), Senior Surgeon, Medical Department, British Guiana.
- The Reverend Gerald Hadow. For public services in Nyasaland.
- Augustin Ernest Huart, JP. For public services in Gibraltar.
- Philip James Humphries, Administrative Officer, Tanganyika.
- Kenneth Ingham, MC. For public services in Uganda.
- Charles Herbert Jackson, District Surveyor, Lands and Surveys Department, North Borneo.
- Amirali Yusufali Karimjee. For public services in Tanganyika.
- John Eric MacGregor Landless. For public services in Northern Rhodesia.
- Joseph La Rosa. For public services in Malta.
- Hector Gordon Robert McAlpine, MVO, Administrative Officer, Fiji.
- James Lloyd McGairl, MBE, Principal Social Development Officer, Tanganyika.
- William John McLeod. For services to the Rubber Industry of the Southern Cameroons.
- Muhammad Ali Maqtari. For public services in Aden.
- Malcolm Niel Herbert Milne, ED, Deputy Commissioner of the Southern Cameroons.
- Henry Wako Muloki, Kyabazinga of Busoga (Head of African Local Government and ceremonial head of the Basoga tribe), Uganda.
- Gordon Leonard Munro. For public services in Grenada.
- Patrick Kevin O'Riordan, District Commissioner, Cholo District, Nyasaland.
- Reginald William Osgathorp, Industrial Relations Officer, East African Railways and Harbours.
- Robert Paul, MBE, MD, FRFPS, lately Director, Pneumoconiosis Medical and Research Bureau, Northern Rhodesia.
- Wilfred Oswald Peters. For public services in Montserrat.
- Lionel Achille Pinard, Secretary to the Cabinet, Barbados.
- James Murdoch Ross, formerly Commissioner for Co-operative Development, Uganda.
- Sydney Charles Norman Sackett, Deputy Head of Finance Department, Crown Agents for Oversea Governments and Administrations.
- Kirpal Singh Sagoo. For public services in Kenya.
- Richard Francis Albert Shegog, Her Majesty's Overseas Civil Service. For services in Somaliland.
- Evelyn Cecilia Skempton. For services to education in Jamaica.
- William Soppitt Steel, Chief Entomologist, Northern Rhodesia.
- Francis Edgar Stock, FRCS, Dean of the Faculty of Medicine, Hong Kong University.
- John Crampton Summerfield, Deputy Legal Secretary, East Africa High Commission.
- Anton Tabone. For public services in Malta.
- Bruce Henry Taylor, Commissioner of Police, British Honduras.
- John Thomson. For public services in British Guiana.
- Tseung Fat-im, JP. For public services in Hong Kong.
- Alfred Vaughan Wells, MB, ChB, Senior Medical Officer, St. Lucia.
- Roger Aubone Wilkinson, Officer-in-Charge, Nairobi Extra-Provincial District, Kenya.
- Ian Woodroffe, Colonial Secretary, Seychelles.

==== Member of the Order of the British Empire (MBE) ====
Military Division

Royal Navy

- Lieutenant-Commander (SCC) Edward Harry Barling, Royal Naval Reserve.
- Lieutenant-Commander Stanley Rudolph Bartlett.
- Electrical Lieutenant-Commander Joseph Bryan Criddle.
- Lieutenant-Commander Derek Rowland Ford, DSC.
- Lieutenant-Commander George Onslow Graham, DSC, lately on loan to the Government of the Federation of Malaya.
- Wardmaster Lieutenant-Commander William Jones.
- Captain (SD) (B) Ernest Smith Ough, Royal Marines.
- Instructor Lieutenant-Commander Harry Page.
- Supply Lieutenant-Commander Frank Percival, (Retd).
- Lieutenant-Commander Michael Thomas Prest.
- Engineer Lieutenant-Commander Edwin Gerald Salmon.
- Lieutenant-Commander Kenneth Sinclair.
- Lieutenant-Commander John Geoffrey Unsworth, (Retd).
- Lieutenant-Commander Keith Dorée Vicary.
- Lieutenant (SD) Alan Wright, on loan to the Royal Australian Navy.

Army

- Captain Geoffrey William Alderman (377746), The Royal Hampshire Regiment.
- Captain Charles Edward Arthur (166800), Royal Regiment of Artillery, Territorial Army.
- Major Edward Joseph Axisa (103087), Royal Malta Artillery.
- Major Hugh Murray Gladwin Baillie (182442), The Parachute Regiment, Territorial Army.
- 6462452 Warrant Officer Class II Henry Edgar Baker, Royal Regiment of Artillery.
- Major Albert Ross Bowtell, TD, MB, (68815), Royal Army Medical Corps, Territorial Army.
- Major (Quartermaster) Walter Brown (236065), Intelligence Corps (now R.A.R.O).
- Major (Quartermaster) Alfred Horace Catt (426703), The Queen's Own Buffs, The Royal Kent Regiment.
- Major Dorrien Richard Wingate Graham Collins-Charlton (56640), The, Queen's Royal Irish Hussars, Royal Armoured Corps.
- Major (acting) James Clamp, DCM, MM, (347127), Army Cadet Force.
- Captain Raymond William Clues (401736), Royal Army Ordnance Corps.
- Major (Quartermaster) Daniel Edward Croucher (388623), Royal Army Dental Corps.
- Major (now Lieutenant-Colonel (temporary)) Robert Hugh Cuming (143414), The Royal Scots Greys (2nd Dragoons), Royal Armoured Corps.
- Major Bertram Edwin Dawes (277581), Army Catering Corps.
- Major Peter Ernest Dey (256522), Royal Tank Regiment, Royal Armoured Corps.
- 399436 Warrant Officer Class II Alfred James Down, The Shropshire Yeomanry, Royal Armoured Corps, Territorial Army.
- Major Charles Peter Dryland, MC, (137499), The Royal Welch Fusiliers.
- 6985838 Warrant Officer Class I John Charles Walter Duggan, Royal Army Ordnance Corps.
- Major (Quartermaster) James Alexander Dunbar (255943), Royal Corps of Signals.
- Major Maldwyn Evans, MC, (299295), Royal Army Service Corps.
- Major Denis Rupert Fraymouth (71100), The Royal Warwickshire Regiment (now R.A.R.O).
- Major Joan Godolphin (192834), Women's Royal Army Corps.
- 4526479 Warrant Officer Class II Frederick Greenwood, Royal Regiment of Artillery, Territorial Army.
- 863293 Warrant Officer Class I Douglas Harris, Army Physical Training Corps.
- 21004104 Warrant Officer Class II Gordon James Hart, Corps of Royal Engineers.
- Major Mary Westby Hickson (252567), Women's Royal Army Corps.
- S/4615072 Warrant Officer Class I Robert Holmes, Royal Army Service Corps.
- Major Richard Hedley Hough, GM, (334426), Corps of Royal Engineers.
- Major Claude Eric Hubbard (401473), Royal Army Service Corps, Territorial Army.
- Captain Charles Richard Huxtable (420858), The Duke of Wellington's Regiment (West Riding).
- 14453224 Warrant Officer Class I Peter Wilson James, Corps of Royal Engineers.
- Major David Jardine (244398), Corps of Royal Electrical and Mechanical Engineers.
- Major (Quartermaster) Auguste Joanny (294581), 1st East Anglian Regiment (Royal Norfolk and Suffolk).
- Major James Patrick Larkin (200824), The Royal Inniskilling Fusiliers.
- Captain Barbara May Laverack (436969), Women's Royal Army Corps.
- The Reverend Sidney George Lescher, Chaplain to the Forces, Third Class (263527), Royal Army Chaplains' Department.
- Captain Douglas Alexander Litster, TD, (314485), Royal Regiment of Artillery, Territorial Army.
- Captain Graeme Kerr Matthew, MB, (458965), Royal Army Medical Corps.
- The Reverend William Hamilton Horace McClelland, Chaplain to the Forces, Fourth Class (415981), Royal Army Chaplains' Department.
- Captain (Quartermaster) James McLean (439371), Royal Regiment of Artillery.
- LS/2718472 Warrant Officer Class I Michael Moran, MM, Irish Guards.
- Major (acting) Albert Henry George Morle, TD, (176833), Combined Cadet Force.
- 206551 Effendi Class I Ndolo s/o Lele, The King's African Rifles.
- 22244809 Warrant Officer Class II Walter George Herbert Old, The Parachute Regiment, Territorial Army.
- Captain (Quartermaster) Richard Outhwaite (439047), The Green Howards (Alexandra, Princess of Wales's Own Yorkshire Regiment).
- S/4615438 Warrant Officer Class I Mauriss William Perkins, Royal Army Service Corps.
- Major Fredrick Charles Phillips (170942), Royal Tank Regiment, Royal Armoured Corps.
- Major Charles Darien Murray-Playfair, (372851), Royal Regiment of Artillery.
- 22271922 Warrant Officer Class II Albert Edward Pretty, The King's Own Royal Regiment (Lancaster), Territorial Army.
- S/4688132 Warrant Officer Class I Frederick Lloyd Price, Royal Army Service Corps.
- LS/22531558 Warrant Officer Class II William Francis Robertson, Queen's Own Highlanders (Seaforth and Camerons).
- 2548836 Warrant Officer Class I (acting) (now Warrant Officer Class II) Thomas Herbert Robinson, Corps of Royal Engineers.
- Major (local Lieutenant-Colonel) Sidney Frank Saunders (193120), Royal Regiment of Artillery.
- Major Denis Rowland Siddall, TD, (137313), The Duke of Wellington's Regiment (West Riding), Territorial Army.
- Major Harold Spary (199132), Corps of Royal Engineers (now R.A.R.O).
- Major John Sidney Sutherland (311963), Royal Armoured Corps.
- Major Arthur Frank Tudor (311968), Corps of Royal Engineers.
- Captain (Quartermaster) Ernest Turton (435935), The King's Own Royal Border Regiment.
- Major (Quartermaster) John Holman Walters (266339), Royal Army Service Corps.
- Lieutenant (Assistant Paymaster) James Arthur Warner (468531), Royal Army Pay Corps.
- Major (acting) Robert Denham Wilson (197028), Combined Cadet Force.
- Major Frederick Martin Spencer Winter (267386), Royal Corps of Signals.
- Major David James Wood (228639), 1st Green Jackets, 43rd and 52nd.
- Major James Jewitt Wood (237092), Royal Pioneer Corps.
- Major David Augustine Bond (217313), Royal Corps of Signals, on loan to the Government of the Federation of Malaya.
- Major (now Lieutenant-Colonel (temporary)) Douglas Jeffrey Cairns (182159), 3rd East Anglian Regiment (16th/44th Foot), on loan to the Government of Ghana.
- Major Mary Annie Gray Cameron, ARRC, (206085), Queen Alexandra's Royal Army Nursing Corps (now R.A.R.O), formerly on loan to the Government of Pakistan.
- Major (local Lieutenant-Colonel) John Francis Dover, TD, (33476), Royal Army Pay Corps, on loan to the Government of the Federation of Malaya.
- Major (temporary) Frank Edward Euston (415319), Royal Army Medical Corps, on loan to the Government of Ghana.
- 558716 Warrant Officer Class I Richard Phillip Hambridge Grayling, Army Physical Training Corps, formerly on loan to the Government of Ghana.
- Major Gordon Johnson Kilb (318220), Royal Army Pay Corps, on loan to the Government of Ghana.
- Captain (Quartermaster) James Alfred Moland (452832), The Staffordshire Regiment (Prince of Wales's), on loan to the Government of Ghana.
- Major (temporary) James Fiddes Nicol (331928), Corps of Royal Engineers, on loan to the Government of Ghana.
- Major William Eversley Sherratt (324599), Royal Corps of Signals, on loan to the Government of the Federation of Malaya.
- Captain Charles Adam Webb, Bechuanaland Protectorate Police Force.
- Major Ralph Stewart Capell, Hong Kong Volunteer Forces.
- 6896763 Warrant Officer Class II Leslie Eric Eveson, 2nd Green Jackets, The King's Royal Rifle Corps, serving with the Kenya Regiment (Territorial Force).

Royal Air Force

- Squadron Leader John Parmella Balfour, DFC, (44872).
- Squadron Leader Cedric Claud Bevan, DFC, (172095).
- Squadron Leader Frank Binns (174255).
- Squadron Leader Frank Temlett Bishop (43757).
- Squadron Leader Percy Frederick Christopher, DFC, (156784).
- Squadron Leader George Curry, DFM, (173870).
- Squadron Leader Douglas Stewart Dickins, AFC, (41681).
- Squadron Leader Donald Fitzgerald, DFC, (133482).
- Squadron Leader Cyril Higgins (48880).
- Squadron Leader Frederick William Hubbard (178521).
- Squadron Leader Philip Henry Hudgell (199411).
- Squadron Leader Colin King (570793).
- Squadron Leader Patrick Dennis Lee (59882), Royal Air Force Regiment.
- Squadron Leader Ronald Samuel Mason (141236).
- Squadron Leader Fred Harold Emmott Nunwick (159380).
- Squadron Leader Ricci Derrick Sidney Orchard (175488).
- Squadron Leader Edward Henry O'Toole (54033).
- Squadron Leader George Parker (42523), (Retd).
- The Reverend Desmond Eric William Hercules Sheppard (501431).
- Squadron Leader Maurice Short, AFC, (579101).
- Squadron Leader Colin Sinclair (52096) Royal Air Force.
- Squadron Leader Kenneth Eric Wooldridge (137785).
- Acting Squadron Leader Thomas Charles Baynton Hughes (148418), Royal Air Force Volunteer Reserve (Training Branch).
- Acting Squadron Leader Peter Robert Mayle (203280).
- Flight Lieutenant William Stanley Martin (143330).
- Flight Lieutenant Reginald Ernest Michie (167638).
- Flight Lieutenant Norman Morley North (183904).
- Flight Lieutenant Rodney Hampton Shepherd (185276), Royal Auxiliary Air Force.
- Flight Lieutenant James Eric Torkildsen (56558).
- Flight Lieutenant Alan Swainson Townsend, MB, BS, (506128), Royal Air Force Reserve of Officers (NS List).
- Flight Lieutenant Edgar Stephen Williams (196601).
- Acting Flight Lieutenant Benjamin Lawrence Rees (66945), Royal Air Force Volunteer Reserve (Training Branch).
- Acting Flight Lieutenant Robert William Thornton (56492).
- Flying Officer William Finlay (532963).
- Pilot Officer Ernest Benjamin Shaw (1177210).
- Master Technician Robert Walter Ernest Claydon (567291).
- Master Technician William Edward Greenhalgh (541746).
- Warrant Officer Ronald Sidney Barham (524800).
- Warrant Officer James Buck (570828).
- Warrant Officer David Cruckling (516164).
- Warrant Officer Walter Johnston Fletcher (590506).
- Warrant Officer John Charles Clifford Ghey (513664).
- Warrant Officer Ronald William Haysom (517321).
- Warrant Officer Harry Lewis (618844).
- Warrant Officer Sydney Scamp (509419).

Civil Division

- Marjorie Ablett. For political services in Whitehaven.
- Dorothy Adamson, JP. For public services in Hyde, Cheshire.
- Walter James Adcock. For political services in Warwick and Leamington.
- Winifred Lizzie Aldwinckle, ARRC, Matron, Royal Berkshire Hospital, Reading.
- Laura Massingham Alexander, JP. For services to youth in Southend-on-Sea.
- Donald Allister, Chief Warden, Luton Division, Civil Defence Corps.
- Leslie Richard Allum, Higher Executive Officer, Ministry of Aviation.
- Charles Norwood Anderson. For services to the Boy Scouts Movement.
- Captain John Laurence Inkster Anderson, Dockmaster, Leith Dock Commission.
- Ronald James Andrew, JP. For political services in Ruislip.
- Alfred James Andrews, Officer, Manchester Purchase Tax Centre, Board of Customs and Excise.
- Harry Rust Annis. For political services in Lanarkshire.
- John Eric Christie Arcol. For political services in Blyth.
- Walter Dawson Austin, Works Accountant, Springfields Works, Preston, Lancashire, United Kingdom Atomic Energy Authority.
- George Baden Dearden Axson, Senior Executive Officer, Ministry of Pensions and National Insurance.
- Kathleen Vera Ball, County Borough Organiser, Bristol, Women's Voluntary Service.
- Wilson James Ball, Education Officer, British Council, Dacca, Pakistan.
- Harold Francis Banks, Vice-Principal and Head of Department of Mining, Doncaster Technical College.
- Henry Barber, Manager, Mansfield, Nottinghamshire, National Assistance Board.
- Observer Commander Herbert Philip Barber, Group Commandant, No. 16 Group, Royal Observer Corps.
- Nancy Florence Barlow, Administrator, Women's Voluntary Service, Near East Land Forces.
- Roger Barsotti, Director of Music, Metropolitan Police.
- Alace Joan Batten. Lately Honorary Secretary, Central Panels Committee, Council for the Preservation of Rural England.
- Captain Thomas Newby Beaton, Master, MV Granwood, William France, Fenwick & Co. Ltd., London.
- Charles William Bedford, Senior Information Officer, Central Office of Information.
- William Ernest Bell, Superintendent, Applied Electronics Laboratory, General Electric Co. Ltd., Portsmouth, Hampshire.
- Alfred Edward Bickerstaff, Chief Clerk, District Probate Registry, Bangor.
- Norman Arthur Blackburn, chairman, Dewsbury National Assistance Appeal Tribunal.
- James William Bonner. Lately Member, Bedfordshire Agricultural Executive Committee.
- Andrew Bowden. For political services.
- Clarence Bowden, chairman, Glossop Savings Committee.
- James Escolme Bowen. For political services in Ebbw Vale.
- William Branston, Assistant Blast Furnace Manager, John Lysaght's Scunthorpe Works, Lincolnshire.
- Arthur John Brawn, Divisional Estate Officer and Estate Adviser, Headquarters, British Transport Commission.
- John Brocklebank. For political services in Birkenhead.
- Stanley George Brown, JP, chairman, South East Norfolk Savings Committee.
- Thomas William Aston Brown, Technical Officer, Grade B, Office of the Receiver for the Metropolitan Police District.
- William Doughty Brown, Export Manager, George Angus & Co. Ltd., Newcastle upon Tyne.
- Margaret Browne, Member, Scottish Probation Advisory and Training Council.
- Thomas Henry Brunt, Marketing Officer, Grade A, Ministry of Agriculture, Fisheries and Food.
- Albert Victor Bryant, Senior Trade Officer, Ministry of Agriculture, Fisheries and Food.
- Leonard George Bunce, chief experimental officer, Atomic Weapons Research Establishment, Aldermaston.
- Arthur Thomas Burton, Secretary, Welsh Board for Industry, Board of Trade.
- James Henry Burton, Civilian Stores Officer, Grade I, Central Ordnance Depot, Donnington, War Office.
- Gordon James Busby, Manager, Swindon Branch, Western Division, British Road Services Ltd.
- Cyril Howard Bush, Higher Executive Officer, Civil Service Commission.
- Frederick Butler, Superintendent, Motor Transport Workshop, Ministry of Home Affairs for Northern Ireland.
- Bertie Augustus Campbell. For public services in Essex.
- John Frederick Cardy, Executive Officer, Ministry of Health.
- Leonard David Carmichael, Chief Cartographer, Directorate of Overseas (Geodetic and Topographic) Surveys, Colonial Office.
- Agnes Nimmo Carruthers, District Nurse, Amble, Northumberland.
- Carmelo Caruana, Local Assistant to Captain of HM Dockyard, Gibraltar.
- Norah Dorothy Cashmore, After Care Worker, The Incorporated Hostels.
- Alfred Cawse. Lately Clerical Officer, West Midland Traffic Area, Ministry of Transport.
- John Chadwick, JP, chairman, Oldham, Middleton and District War Pensions Committee.
- William Frederick Chambers, Senior Executive Officer, Ministry of Pensions and National Insurance.
- Frank Nichols Charles, Area Engineer, Brighton, General Post Office.
- William Charles, Member, Wrexham Rural District Council.
- Vera Muriel Clarke, Quartermaster, Nottinghamshire Branch, British Red Cross Society.
- Charles Reuben Clear, Secretary, Rowland Hill Benevolent Fund, General Post Office.
- Winifred Martha Cleary. Lately Headmistress, Rosendale County Primary Infants' School, London, and for service on national and international educational organisations.
- George Cleland (Senior), JP, Works Manager, Heathfield & Cardowan Fireclay Co. Ltd., Lanarkshire.
- Harry Clough, Clerical Assistant, Ministry of Agriculture, Fisheries and Food.
- Richard Alfred Cocke. Lately Guided Weapons Trials Manager, now Bloodhound Project Engineer, Bristol Aircraft Ltd., Bristol.
- Captain George Hamilton Coey, chairman, Banbridge and Dromore Hospital Management Committee.
- Sidney Cohen, Regional Chief Clerk of Works (Technical, Grade B), Ministry of Works.
- Herbert Frederick Collard, Chief Draughtsman, E. N. Bray Ltd., Waltham Cross, Hertfordshire.
- William Ramsdale Collier, Chief Engineer of the Naval Section, Rose Brothers (Gainsborough) Ltd.
- Lillian Mary Conway, Secretary, National Joint Industrial Council, Heating, Ventilating and Domestic Engineering Industry.
- Hilda Bessie Cook, Grade 4 Officer, Foreign Office.
- Violet Lola Cope, Clerical Officer, Ministry of Aviation.
- Minerva Corteen, Secretary to the chairman, and the Direotor-General, British Broadcasting Corporation.
- Cedric Frederick Cox. Lately Senior Executive Officer, Foreign Office.
- Richard Charles Cox, Senior Executive Officer, Commonwealth Relations Office.
- George Crichton, B.II Officer, Government Communications Headquarters.
- Martin Cullen, Fitting Shop Superintendent, James Howden & Co. Ltd., Glasgow.
- Thomas Joseph Culleton. For political and public services in Willesden and Southend.
- Arthur Cunliffe, Rescue Station Superintendent, Boothstown, North Western Division, National Coal Board.
- Margaret Janetta Lewis, Lady Daley, JP, County Borough Organiser, Portsmouth, Women's Voluntary Service.
- John Sparks Darling, Communications Officer, Foreign Office.
- Horace Bernard Davies, Headmaster, Thomas Delarue School for Spastics, Tonbridge.
- John Davies, Headmaster, Blaen-y-Cwm Primary School, Glamorgan, and for services to music in Wales.
- George William Cyril Davis, Chief Superintendent, Metropolitan Police.
- John Hall Davis, Higher Executive Officer, Ministry of Pensions and National Insurance.
- Elizabeth Julia Dawes. For political services in London.
- Phyllis Emily Dawson. Lately Clerical Officer Secretary, British Museum.
- Richard Douglas Dawson, Fish Merchant, Seahouses, Northumberland.
- Hildebert De Lacy, Senior Executive Officer, Ministry of Pensions and National Insurance.
- Margaret Edith Dent, Executive Officer, Commonwealth Relations Office.
- John Dill, Honorary Secretary, Adwick-le-Street Savings Committee.
- Robert Redvers Donald, Divisional Officer, Forestry Commission, Scotland.
- Robert James Dornan, Secretary, Irish Wholesale Clothing Manufacturers' Association.
- Leslie Douglass. Lately Secretary and Engineer, Isle of Man Electricity Board.
- Cyril Dove, Secretary, North Western Area, Transport Users' Consultative Committee.
- John William Norman Drew, Communications Officer, Grade I, Northern Division, Ministry of Aviation.
- Alexander Duchart, Administrative Manager, Unilever Development Unit, Aberdeen.
- John Charles Eames, Senior Executive Officer, HM Land Registry.
- Duncan Stanley Eastman, JP. Lately Member, Suffolk Agricultural Executive Committee.
- George Eddie. For political services in Glasgow.
- George Marsden Elliott, Inspector of Taxes (Higher Grade), Board of Inland Revenue.
- Edward Arthur Emery, Executive Engineer, London Telecommunications Region, General Post Office.
- Margaret Crawford Campbell Evans, chairman, Chester Savings Committee.
- Augustus Everingham, Administrative Officer, Grade II, London County Council.
- Albert Victor Adam Fiddes, Clerical Officer, Royal Air Force, Upavon.
- Margaret Fitton, Clerk, Finance Department, East Lancashire Territorial and Auxiliary Forces Association.
- Blanche Constance Flint, JP. For political services in the Isle of Ely.
- John Edmund Flood, Chief Clerk, Devon County Council. For services in the administration of the Devon Flood Relief Fund.
- Rosina Barbara Flynn, Headmistress, Army Children's School, Larnaca, Cyprus.
- Katrine Fogarty, Matron, Whipps Cross Hospital, London.
- Francis William Fowler, First Radio Officer, MV Rangitata, New Zealand Shipping Co. Ltd., London.
- Harold Gaspard Francis, Higher Executive Officer, Ministry of Housing and Local Government.
- George Walter Gardner, Part-time Secretary, Frank James Hospital, Cowes, Isle of Wight.
- Donald Sidney John Garrod, Head of the General Reception Centre, Middlesex County Council.
- Herbert Lancelot Gibbins, Assistant County Civil Defence Controller Designate, Durham.
- Walter Allan Gibbon, Headmaster, Eston County Modern Secondary School, Middlesbrough.
- Edwin Sydney Gibbs, Clerical Officer, Board of Trade.
- Henry Seymour Gibbs, Chief Telecommunications Superintendent, General Post Office.
- Major Arthur Jeptha Gibson, JP, chairman, Lancaster Local Employment Committee.
- Arthur Frederick Gillbe, Engineer II, Ministry of Aviation.
- Ethel Georgina Gurney, Health Visitor, Surrey County Council.
- Marjorie Hall. Lately Scientific Assistant, Commonwealth Bureau of Pastures and Field Crops.
- Edith Valentine Hammond, Attached War Office.
- Lieutenant-Colonel Percy Norman Bennett Hardaker, Senior Experimental Officer, Ministry of Aviation.
- Gladys Harper. For services in the indexing of the London and Belfast Gazettes and Parliamentary Papers.
- Charles Henry Harris, chairman, H. Harris (Ivory) Ltd.
- Edward Harrison, Commercial Manager, Platt Brothers (Sales) Ltd.
- Thomas Gordon Campbell Harrop, BEM, Electrical Manager, J. I. Thorneycroft & Co. Ltd., Southampton.
- Priscilla Hart, JP. For political and public services in Derbyshire.
- Robert George Hawkins, chairman and managing director, The Redcliffe Radio & Engineering Co. Ltd., Bristol.
- Walter James Hayball, Manager, Aldershot Employment Exchange.
- Geoffrey David Hayden, Honorary Secretary, Norfolk County, British Legion.
- James Frederick Hayes, Civil Defence Officer, West Midlands Division, National Coal Board.
- John Haywood. For political services in Derby.
- Eric Quinton Hazell, chairman, Quinton Hazell Ltd., Colwyn Bay, North Wales.
- Herbert Lesley Jack Hazelwood. For political services.
- Dorothy Eugenie Henry, Clerical Officer, Home Office.
- Leslie Herbert, Regional Collector of Taxes, Board of Inland Revenue.
- Mabel Constance Heselton. For political and public services in Scarborough and Whitby.
- Arthur Henry Hindley, Senior Labour Manager, Royal Ordnance Factory, Birtley.
- Alexander Edward Hine, Grade 4 Officer, Ministry of Labour.
- Leonard Hitchman. Lately Secretary, East Midland Educational Union.
- Thomas Holland, Principal, Park Parade Secondary School, Belfast.
- Mabel Louie Beatrice Horsley. Lately General Secretary, London Poor Clergy Holiday Fund.
- Muriel Grace Howlett, Senior Producer, Overseas Talks and features, British Broadcasting Corporation.
- Charles Workman Hunter, Postmaster, Dalmuir, Glasgow.
- Doris Elizabeth Hutson, Clerical Officer Secretary, Admiralty.
- Sybil May Ireson, Clerical Officer Secretary, Commonwealth Relations Office.
- Major James Irving, TD, Member, Nottingham and District War Pensions Committee.
- Thomas Robertson Jackson, Headmaster, Langcraigs Primary School, Paisley.
- John William Jeffrey, Superintendent and Deputy Chief Constable, Renfrew and Bute Constabulary.
- William Jenkins, Treasurer, Working Men's Committee, Royal Victoria Hospital, Belfast.
- Charles Walter Stanley Jennings, Bookseller, HM Stationery Office.
- George Elwyn Jewitt, lately Senior Executive Officer, Welsh Office.
- Albert Johnson, Assistant Chief Constable, Lincolnshire Constabulary.
- John Kaiser, Manager, Outside Power Plant Erection Department, Richardson Westgarth (Hartlepool) Ltd., County Durham.
- Herbert Milton Kippax, JP, chairman, Advisory Committee, Great House Experimental Husbandry Farm, Rossendale.
- Donald Kitcher, Research and Testing Manager, Santon Ltd., Newport, Monmouthshire.
- Gladys Levina Knapp. For political public services in Swindon.
- Bertha Latchford, Departmental Sister (Casualty and Out-patients), Bromley Hospital, Kent.
- Olive May Lee, Matron, St. Vincent's Convalescent Home, Forces Help Society and Lord Roberts Workshops, Isle of Wight.
- Allan Leopold Leggett, Secretary, Agricultural and Horticultural Research Station, Long Ashton, Bristol.
- Hugh Francis Lewis, Second Class Valuer, Board of Inland Revenue.
- Francis Douglas Ley, TD, DL, Honorary Treasurer, No. 126 (Derby) Squadron, Air Training Corps.
- Freda Marion Lindars, Executive Officer, Foreign Office.
- John Hill Lindsay, chairman, Antrim Rural District Council.
- Captain Charles Goodman Linnell, MC. For services to ex-servicemen in Birmingham.
- William Francis Linney, lately chairman, West Suffolk War Pensions Committee.
- Gladys Elizabeth Lockitt, Vice-chairman, Newcastle-under-Lyme Savings Committee, Staffordshire.
- Sidney William Lord, Higher Executive Officer, War Office.
- John Lorimer, Superintendent and Deputy Chief Constable, Gateshead Constabulary.
- Joseph Lyon, Chief Metallurgist, Barrow Steel Works Ltd.
- Samuel Henry McAfee, Inspector of Taxes, Board of Inland Revenue.
- Patrick Hugh McAleese, Senior Technical Superintendent (Engineer), No. 23 Maintenance Unit, Royal Air Force, Aldergrove.
- Helma McCallum, Organiser for Shetlands and North of Scotland Area, Highland Home Industries Ltd.
- Ruby McClure. For political services in County Antrim.
- Arthur Thornton McCubbin, Higher Executive Officer, War Office.
- John Stewart McCutcheon, Honorary Secretary, Coatbridge Centre, and Member of Council, St. Andrew's Ambulance Association.
- James Vincent McIntosh, Works Manager, Fluorescent Lamp Department, Thorn Electrical Industries Ltd.
- Stanley McIntosh, Assistant Firemaster, Lanarkshire Area Fire Brigade.
- Robert McKenna, Senior Executive Officer, Ministry of Power.
- Alison Walker Mackenzie, Member, Scottish Advisory Council on the Welfare of Handicapped Persons.
- Jean Ann Baxter McKiddie, Superintendent Midwife, Dundee Royal Infirmary.
- Barbara Hazel Mackie, Honorary Organising Secretary, Christian Road Safety League.
- Alfred Mackintosh. For services to the Boy Scouts Movement.
- Thomas McMahon, Deputy Principal, Ministry of Commerce for Northern Ireland.
- Ethel Anne McMurray, Children's Organiser, Dumfries County, Women's Voluntary Service.
- William Albert MacTaggart, Vice-chairman, Fife County Savings Committee.
- Helen Sumner Mair, deputy chairman, South Eastern Gas Consultative Council.
- Nellie Eva Major, Executive Officer, Export Credits Guarantee Department.
- Eleanor Agnes Manvell, Higher Executive Officer, Ministry of Defence.
- Edwin James Joseph Maple, Higher Executive Officer, Royal Engineers Record Office, Brighton.
- James Herbert Marks, Quartermaster, Warwickshire Territorial and Auxiliary Forces Association.
- Donald Ross Marples, Export Manager, Morton Sundour Fabrics Ltd., Carlisle.
- Annie Ellenor Marsh. For services to the Women's Section, British Legion.
- John Hubert Marsh, Executive Officer, Admiralty.
- Henry Samuel Amos Marshall, Librarian, Grade III, Royal Botanic Gardens, Kew.
- James Marshall, JP, chairman, Cowal Local Savings Committee, Argyll.
- John Harland Marshall, Higher Executive Officer, Ministry of Transport.
- Percy George Massingham, Executive Officer, Ministry of Health.
- Ingoldsby Philip Massy, Higher Executive Officer, Government Communications Headquarters.
- Joseph Herbert Matson, Senior Executive Officer, Ministry of Pensions and National Insurance.
- John Dillwyn Matthews, Senior Executive Officer, Ministry of Power.
- William Shaw Maxwell, Chief Office Clerk, Offices of the House of Commons.
- Dorothy May May. For political services in Croydon.
- Ernest Charles William Maycock, Senior Experimental Officer, Laboratory of the Government Chemist, Department of Scientific and Industrial Research.
- Doris Elsie Mead, Headmistress, Manor Hospital, Epsom.
- Leslie Frederick Merrett, Foreman of the Yard, Devonport, Admiralty.
- Thomas Raymond Middleton, Project Officer, Imperial Chemical Industries Ltd., Kidderminster.
- William Middleton, Secretary and Treasurer, The Rowett Research Institute, Aberdeen.
- Alfred James Miller, General Manager and Actuary, Aberdeen Savings Bank.
- Thomas Milner. For public services in Dinnington and district.
- Frederick Henry Moore, Higher Executive Officer, Ministry of Education.
- Harold Moore, Senior Executive Officer, National Assistance Board.
- James Christopher Moore, Trades Union Member, Northern Regional Board for Industry.
- Nora Lilian Beatrice Moore, Area Superintendent (Nursing), Eastern Area, London District, St. John Ambulance Brigade.
- William Henry Percy Moore, Senior Inspector of Ships' Provisions, Marine Survey Office, Glasgow, Ministry of Transport.
- Louis Robert Morford, lately Higher Executive Officer, Air Ministry.
- Beatrice Minnie Morrall, Clerical Officer, Ministry of Pensions and National Insurance.
- Alfred Morris, JP, Honorary Vice-president, Durham Branch, British Red Cross Society.
- Tom Murch, Assistant Chief Officer, Gloucestershire Fire Brigade.
- John Mitchell Murray, Grade 3 Officer, Ministry of Labour.
- Archibald William Nasse, Garrison Works Officer, War Office, Kuala Lumpur.
- Muriel Joyce Neilson, Secretary, The Chartered Society of Physiotherapy.
- Ada Elizabeth Newby, Clerical Officer Secretary, Cabinet Office.
- Archibald Everard Nicholls, Immigration Inspector, Liverpool, Home Office.
- James Stuart Oliver, Generation Engineer, North of Scotland Hydro-Electric Board.
- James Orange, JP, Principal Production Inspector, Admiralty.
- Hilda Marie Orme. For services to the Cumberland Rural Choirs Festival.
- Sydney Thomas Osborn, Youth Employment Officer, Kent Education Committee.
- John Henry Outhwaite, Engineer II, Ministry of Aviation.
- Hugh Wynn Owen, Manager, Hereford Employment Exchange.
- Alderman Maurice William Paine, chairman, Newbury Savings Committee.
- David Adamson Palmer, Commandant, Scottish Fire Service Training School, Scottish Home Department.
- Edmund Thomas Palmer, Foreign Technical Representative, J. Evans & Son (Portsmouth) Ltd.
- Charles Park, Regional Technical Information Officer, Ministry of Works.
- Josephine Margaret Parker, Secretary to General Secretary, The Navy League.
- Thomas Parker, lately Assistant Area General Manager, No. 4 (Aberdare) Area, South Western Division, National Coal Board.
- Albert William Parkin, Senior Executive Officer, Air Ministry.
- Alice Marjorie, Lady Paskin, President, The Women's Corona Society.
- Captain Arthur Patrick Joseph Paterson, DSC, Master, MV Whitewing, General Steam Navigation Co. Ltd., London.
- Barbara Mary Peake, Secretary to the Director-General, British Council.
- William Frederick Peck, Trawler Skipper, Northern Trawlers Ltd., Grimsby.
- Frank Lewis Penfold, Higher Executive Officer, War Office.
- Thomas Edward Burleigh Peters, BEM, Principal Foreman of Storehouses, Admiralty.
- William Edwin Petty, Surveyor, Newry, County Down, Board of Customs and Excise.
- Alderman Evan Phillips, Chairman of Committee, No. 1223 (Caerphilly) Squadron, Air Training Corps.
- Thomas Pickard, Member, Bude-Stratton Urban District Council, Cornwall.
- Alice Maude Pilkington, JP. Lately County Commissioner for Fife, Girl Guides Association.
- Ellen Blanche Pretty, Clerical Assistant, Ministry of Education.
- Irwin Barrington Prowse, Senior Assistant Land Commissioner, Ministry of Agriculture, Fisheries and Food.
- William John Purcell. Lately Senior Structural Engineer, Ministry of Works.
- Stanley George Purkiss, Clerical Officer, Ministry of Transport.
- Thomas John Rainsford, General Secretary, Incorporated Cripples' Institutes, Belfast.
- George Charles Ratnage, Grade 4 Officer, Ministry of Labour.
- Norman Frank Richards, Chief Officer, Grimsby Fire Brigade.
- Arthur Richardson, Maker of Violins, Violas and Cellos.
- Arthur John Richardson, Chief Preventive Officer, Dover, Board of Customs and Excise.
- Frank William Richardson, deputy chairman, Southern District Committee, Nottingham County Agricultural Executive Committee.
- William James Ridd, Superintendent, Head Post Office, Newport, Monmouthshire.
- Walter Thomas Roads, Senior Executive Officer, Central Ordnance Depot, Chilwell, War Office.
- Edward Isaac Roberts, Secretary, Northumberland Association of Boys' Clubs.
- Ethel Grace Roberts. For political and public services in the Wirral.
- William Roberts, lately Member, Merionethshire Agricultural Executive Committee.
- Sarah Ann Robinson, JP. For public services in Maryport, Cumberland, and district.
- Elsie Margaret Robson, chairman, South Eastern Regional Street and Village Savings Groups Advisory Committee.
- Dora Irene Roe, JP. Lately County Borough Organiser, Northampton, Women's Voluntary Service.
- John Joel Rowland, Head of Marine Department, The Electrical Apparatus Co. Ltd., St. Albans, Hertfordshire.
- Leonard Hunter Rowley, Senior Station Radio Officer, Admiralty.
- Harry Underwood Rush, Divisional Fatstock Officer, Ministry of Agriculture, Fisheries and Food.
- William Rutherford, Chief Finance Clerk, Territorial and Auxiliary Forces Associations of County Antrim and City of Belfast.
- Marjorie Mary Sanceau, Member, Grants Committee, Royal Air Force Benevolent Fund.
- Minnie Shanks. For political services in Newcastle upon Tyne.
- Sydney Frank Shearsmith, Clerical Officer, Public Trustee Office.
- Harold Shepherd, Chief Chemist, Armoride Ltd., Earby, Lancashire.
- Anne Sheppard, lately Senior Lecturer in Dairying, University of Reading.
- Edgar Thompson Sheppard, Chief Draughtsman, Royal Small Arms Factory, Enfield, War Office.
- Anthony Joseph Shryane, Producer, Midland Region, British Broadcasting Corporation.
- Elsie Emily Simonson, Higher Executive Officer, Ministry of Agriculture, Fisheries and Food.
- William McCullough Sinclair, Staff Officer, Ministry of Health and Local Government for Northern Ireland.
- Adolphus Jesse Skinner, Senior Executive Officer, Board of Trade.
- Albert James Smith, Senior Sales Superintendent, Coventry, General Post Office.
- Arthur James Smith, Divisional Officer and Deputy Chief Officer, Nottingham Fire Brigade.
- Commander Harry Sobey, RD, Royal Naval Reserve, Master, Ocean Weather Ship Weather Adviser, Air Ministry.
- James Graham Henry Somervell. For political services.
- Avis Odeyne Spurway. For services to St. Dunstan's.
- William Welbourne Stephenson. For political services in Middlesex.
- David Longmuir Stewart, Senior Photographer, Glasgow Herald.
- Jean Anne Stobbs, deputy director, Young Women's Christian Association Services Work in Germany.
- John Surtees. For services to Motor Cycle Racing.
- John David Swallow, lately Higher Executive Officer, Air Ministry.
- Hubert Taggart, chairman, North Antrim Area Savings Committee.
- Joan Talbot, JP, County Organiser, Durham, Women's Voluntary Service.
- Ben Tatham, Main Grade Civil Engineer, Office of the Divisional Road Engineer, Manchester, Ministry of Transport.
- Ellen Taylor. For political and public services in Sussex.
- Edwin Noble Tease, District Inspector, Royal Ulster Constabulary.
- William Arthur Terry, chairman, Canterbury, Faversham and District War Pensions Committee.
- Constance Gwenllian Thomas, Honorary Secretary, Swansea Old People's Welfare Committee.
- David John Thomas. Lately Member, National Executive Council, Iron and Steel Trades Confederation.
- Morley Thomas, chairman, Connah's Quay Urban District Council.
- Eileen Marjorie Thompson, Executive Officer, Savings Department, General Post Office.
- Margaret Thompson, JP, Centre Organiser, Rhondda Borough, Women's Voluntary Service.
- Joyce Frances Veasey, Grade 4 Officer, Foreign Office.
- James Scott Vipond. For political services in Renfrewshire.
- Reuben Vivian, Senior Executive Officer, Ministry of Pensions and National Insurance.
- John Alfred Ward. For political services in Belper.
- Maureen Patricia Waters, Executive Officer, Ministry of Transport.
- William Ord Watt, Senior Executive Officer, Department of Agriculture and Fisheries for Scotland.
- Walter Offenburg Welch, Chief Engineer, MV Gartwood, Constantine Lines Ltd., Glasgow.
- Francis Ernest West. Lately Executive Officer, No. 2 Engineer Stores Depot and Workshop, Liphook, War Office.
- Doris Victoria Westhead. For political and public services in Stafford and Stone.
- John Edward Westmoreland, Mental Health Officer, Nottingham.
- Lieutenant-Colonel Arthur Cyril Whitcombe. For services to The Officers' Association.
- Amy Marian White. For political and public services in Cheshire.
- Alfred William Whitehead, Joint Secretary, General Precision Systems Ltd., Aylesbury, Buckinghamshire.
- Reginald Willoughby Whitehead, MC, chairman, Sites and Construction Sub-Committee of Housing Committee, New Forest Rural District Council.
- Eveline Nancy Whittome, County Secretary, Hampshire Association for the Care of the Blind.
- Robert McQuillen Whyte, Town Clerk, Irvine.
- Thomas William Wilcox, Manager, Middlesbrough Employment Exchange.
- Julius George Wilkes. For public services in Gateshead.
- Benjamin Williams, BEM, Superintendent and Deputy Chief Constable, Flintshire Constabulary.
- Benjamin Williams, chairman, Rhondda Local Employment Committee.
- Hubert Cecil Oliver Williams, Higher Executive Officer, Ministry of Pensions and National Insurance.
- Thomas Edwards Williams. For political services in Caernarvon.
- John William Winter, Town Clerk, Huntingdon and Godmanchester Borough Council.
- Sidney Alex Winterbone. Lately District Organiser, National Union of Agricultural Workers.
- Henry James Godwin Wolf, chairman, Paint Industry Export Group.
- Reginald Bertie Woodhouse, Attached War Office.
- Elizabeth Helen Young, Higher Executive Officer, Department of Health for Scotland.
- William Henry Young, Honorary Secretary, Neath Industrial Savings Sub-Committee.
- John Beardwood, Senior Market Officer, Commercial Department, Her Majesty's Embassy, Brussels.
- James Bryson, Clerical Officer, Her Majesty's Embassy, Beirut.
- Frank Christopher Christie, British subject resident in Indonesia.
- May Annie Hamson, British subject resident in Turkey.
- Mohammed Abdul Latif, Accountant and Administration Officer, Her Majesty's Consulate-General, Basra.
- Peggy Lee, Accounts Clerk, Office of the United Kingdom Commissioner-General for South-East Asia, Singapore.
- David Lawrence Lister, Senior Master, New Mansur Primary School, Baghdad.
- The Reverend James Mackintosh, Headmaster, San Andres School, Lima.
- Christina Campbell Mathewson, lately Superintendent of Typists, Her Majesty's Embassy, Bonn.
- Gerald Edward Miller, British Consul, Las Palmas.
- John Miller, Travel Officer, Her Majesty's Embassy, Paris.
- The Right Reverend Monseigneur Lorenzo (Michael) Mizzi, Rector of the Basilica of St. Augustine, Hippone, Bône.
- John Muscat, British subject resident in Tripoli.
- Edgar Collins Penson, Second Secretary (Commercial), Her Majesty's Embassy, Tokyo.
- Captain Richard Herbert Poppleton, British subject resident in Argentina.
- Betty Jean Porter, British subject resident in the United States of America.
- Ernest Alexander Robertson, Regional Information Officer, Her Majesty's Consulate, Atlanta.
- Colin MacKenzie Shaw, British subject resident in Honduras.
- Alfred Spencer, British subject resident in France.
- Hans Stierer, Deputy Head, External Department, British Military Government, Berlin.
- Raymond James Tuite, lately Press Officer, Her Majesty's Embassy, Bonn.
- Vincent Mary Roger Vella, British Vice-Consul, Tunis.
- Alexander Aitken, of Koorda, State of Western Australia. For services in the field of local government.
- Thomas Henry Spence Barnard, Principal, Teacher Training School, Gutu, Southern Rhodesia.
- Ronald Godfrey Baxter, Deputy Superintendent of Police, Federation of Malaya.
- Phillip Oswald Beddoes, Shire Clerk, Talbragar Shire Council, State of New South Wales.
- Donald Walter Beeden, MM, formerly Superintendent of Police, Federation of Malaya.
- Dorothy Christina Beveridge. For services to local government in the State of New South Wales.
- Albert Edward Bradshaw. For public services in the State of New South Wales.
- Roger Thomas Brooks, formerly Superintendent of Police, Federation of Malaya.
- Esther Elizabeth Gascoyne Coventry. For services to the United Kingdom community in Pakistan.
- Sister Mary Damese, Principal, St. Mary's Institution, Roma, Basutoland.
- Captain Stanley Leichhardt Diamond, formerly of the Queensland Coast and Torres Strait Pilot Service, State of Queensland.
- Dorothy Mary Dicey. For social welfare and cultural services in the South Western part of Southern Rhodesia.
- Mary Cecil Eastwood, chairman, Young Contingent Committee, The Victoria League.
- Mary Evans. For social welfare services in the State of Victoria.
- Lily Ray Fahy. For charitable services in the State of New South Wales.
- Blake Goldsmith, MM, a botanist, of Southern Rhodesia.
- Edith Griffiths, of Hobart, State of Tasmania. For services to charitable and social welfare movements.
- Thomas Ellis Hatton, Superintendent of Police, Federation of Malaya.
- Mary Elsie Ann Hatwell, of Thebarton, State of South Australia. For social welfare services.
- Jeanie Rae Jollyman. For services rendered under the auspices of the Dominions Fellowship Trust in connection with hospitality to visitors from overseas.
- Horace Jones, Chairman of the Finance Committee, Princess Margaret Hospital for Children, State of Western Australia.
- Sadie Gertrude Kaplan, of Bulawayo, Southern Rhodesia. For social welfare services.
- The Venerable Frank Knight, Archdeacon of the Country, and Canon, St. John's Cathedral, Brisbane, State of Queensland.
- Felix Shakespeare Levinson, President, Home of Peace, Subiaco, State of Western Australia.
- Isabelle McCorkindale, of Holland Park, State of Queensland. For services rendered in connection with temperance and women's organisations.
- Eileen Spencer Morris, MD, formerly Medical Superintendent, St. Stephen's Hospital, Delhi, India.
- Florence Matilda Morris, of Unley, State of South Australia. For social welfare services.
- Gweneth Audrey Morton, Clerk to the council, The Royal Commonwealth Society.
- Margaret Angus Patterson, MB, FRCS(Ed), in charge of the Planter's Hospital, Darjeeling, India.
- Fanny Reading, MB, MS. For social welfare services in the State of New South Wales.
- Eileen Doris Renton. For services rendered under the auspices of the Victoria League in connection with hospitality to students from overseas.
- George Bernard Reynolds, formerly Headmaster, Services Primary School, Giffard Camp, Accra, Ghana.
- Charles William Roseblade, of Yungaburra, State of Queensland. For services to primary industries in North Queensland.
- Councillor Ralph Simons Rowland, JP, of the Shire of Tullaroop, State of Victoria.
- Norman Albert Sachisthal, Superintendent of the Charlton Memorial Home for Boys, State of New South Wales.
- Chief Simon Sigola, of the Mzingwane Reserve, Southern Rhodesia.
- Wilfrid Mylchreest Simmonds, of Babinda, State of Queensland. For services in connection with local government and charitable organisations in North Queensland.
- Margaret Blake Hatchard-Smith. For services rendered under the auspices of the Dominions Fellowship Trust in connection with hospitality to visitors from overseas.
- John Herbert Sorrell, JP, of Ballarat, State of Victoria. For public and charitable services.
- Ida May Spencer. For social welfare services, especially under the auspices of the Country Women's Association, in the State of Western Australia.
- Katherine Elma Sturt, formerly Matron and Superintendent of Nursing, Royal North Shore Hospital, State of New South Wales.
- Desmond Harper Taylor, District Officer, Basutoland.
- Mac Musa Thobileng, Senior Co-operative Inspector, Co-operative Department, Basutoland.
- Edaline Vaughan Thomason, President, District Nursing Association, State of Queensland.
- Raymond West, JP, Town Clerk, Borough of Shepparton, State of Victoria.
- Cyril Augustus Wilson. For services to ex-servicemen in the State of New South Wales.
- Albert Edwin Young, of Newcastle, State of New South Wales. For services to the community.
- Maskini Adua, Chief Judge, West Nile District Council, Uganda.
- Sydney Aloysius Anderson, Chief of Police, St. Vincent.
- Mary Elizabeth Archbold. For services to education in Tanganyika.
- Charles Austin. For public services in the Bahamas.
- Dorothy Bartlett. For public services in Nyasaland.
- Maurice John Victor Bonello, Higher Executive Officer, Malta.
- Douglas Walkden-Brown. For services to agricultural education in Fiji.
- Joyce Hilda Burnham, Matron, Grade II, North Borneo.
- Ronald Chalmers, Assistant Secretary, Malta.
- Joseph Chamberlain Chandisingh. For services to education in British Guiana.
- Chau Fook-Tin, Senior Clerk, Medical and Health Department, Hong Kong.
- Frances Perthinia Constantine, Head Teacher, Education Department, St. Helena.
- Louisa Julia Cowie, Matron, Keith Falconer Hospital, Church of Scotland Mission, Sheikh Othman, Aden.
- Mae Chalmers Cran, Secretary to Provincial Commissioner, Central Province, Nyasaland.
- David Theophilus Davies, Accountant, Public Works Department, Gambia.
- Geraint George Davies, Education Officer (Principal, King George VI School), Zanzibar.
- Cyril Vivian Somerset Early, lately Agricultural Officer, Bermuda.
- Percival Musgrave Ewing, Postmaster-General, British Honduras.
- Thomas Fernsly Figgis, Administrative Officer, Tanganyika.
- Eric Firman, Manager, Milk Marketing Undertaking, Malta.
- Greta Fowler. For services to drama in Jamaica.
- Wenzel Vernon Granger, Superintendent of Police, Bahamas.
- James Arnold Green, TD, Town Clerk, Arusha Town Council, Tanganyika.
- Teja Singh Grewal, Superintendent of Prisons, Tanganyika.
- William John Grierson, Collector of Customs and Harbour Master, Falkland Islands.
- Florence Guyler. For public services in Kenya.
- Cedric Caesar Hawkins, Maintenance Superintendent of the Interior District, Public Works Department, British Guiana.
- Ronald Walter Heal, Superintendent, Opium Treatment Centre, Singapore.
- Francis Charles Hecker, Road Superintendent, Public Works Department, British Honduras.
- Eileen Mary Herbert, Medico-Social Worker, Mulago Hospital, Kampala, Uganda.
- Clementina Howard. For public services in Trinidad.
- Clarence Evans Hubah. For public services in Trinidad.
- Melville Eric Jones, Accountant and Storekeeper, Marine Department, Gambia.
- Akio Nansowe Wamara Kamese, Co-operative Officer, Uganda.
- Leopold Paliandy Kerry, lately Conveyancing Officer, Deeds Registry, British Guiana.
- Abdullah Hamid Khalifa, Secretary for Local Government, Aden.
- Creswick Winville King, Permanent Secretary, Chief Minister's Office, St. Lucia.
- Dorothea Agnes King. For public services in Bermuda.
- Johanna Kinyiha. For public services in Kenya.
- Moira Knight. For public services in Mauritius.
- Kwan Fui Kong, lately Senior Assistant Accountant, North Borneo.
- Wilma Agatha Lake. For services to the Girl Guide Movement in Anguilla.
- Eric Arthur William Lewis, Secretary, Health Division, Ministry of Health and Labour, Tanganyika.
- George Stanley MacKay, Higher Executive Officer, Crown Agents for Oversea Governments and Administrations.
- Nyandika Maiyoro. For services to athletics in Kenya.
- Dhirajlal Kanaiyalal Marphatia. For public services in Uganda.
- John Berchmans Gaulbert Matikke, Nursing Superintendent, Southern Cameroons Medical Department.
- Chief Mburuma, Senior Chief of the Senga-Chikunda Native Authority, Northern Rhodesia.
- Benedict Robert Miles. For public services in Gibraltar.
- Jessie Agnes Minott, lately Assistant Matron, Kingston Public Hospital, Jamaica.
- Adam Louis Mohamed, Clerk, East African Railways and Harbours.
- Atta Mohamed s/o Ali Bux, Senior Inspector of Works, East African Posts and Telecommunications Administration.
- Max Moutia, Programme Producer, Mauritius Broadcasting Service.
- George Frederick Mullin, Superintendent of Police, Jamaica.
- The Reverend Brother Austin O'Donnell, Headmaster, Seychelles College.
- Willie Gillan Paia, BEM. For public services in the British Solomon Islands Protectorate.
- Harmanbhai Zaverbhai Patel, Investigation Officer, East African Customs and Excise Department.
- Harriette Lydia Penn, Chief Accountant, British Virgin Islands.
- Kenneth Anderson Phillips, Geologist, Northern Rhodesia.
- Eric Otto Popper, lately managing director of the Kota Kota Produce & Trading Society Ltd., Nyasaland.
- Harry George Richards, Office Superintendent, Secretariat, St. Helena.
- Harubu Saidi, Education Officer, Tanganyika.
- Norman Sanderson, lately Chief Sales and Service Superintendent, East African Posts and Telegraphs Administration.
- Olga Lopes-Seale. For public services in British Guiana.
- Orang Kaya Kaya Sedomon bin Gunsanad, District Chief, Keningau, North Borneo.
- Leonard Ernest Steigenberger Sharp, MB, BCh. For public services in Uganda.
- Bernard Shaw, Senior Health Inspector, Kenya.
- Noel Frederick Shaw, Executive Officer, Kenya.
- Henry Charles Shepperson, Road Superintendent, Aden.
- Edith Margaret Wilton-Steer, Secretary, Representative Members' Organisation of Legislative Council, Uganda.
- John Victor Stupart. For public services in Northern Rhodesia.
- James Alfred William Summer, lately Confidential Clerk to the Government of Northern Rhodesia.
- Stephen Arthur Symon, District Commissioner, Abercorn, Northern Rhodesia.
- Senior Chief Cheborge arap Tengecha, Senior Chief of the Kipsigis Tribe, Kenya.
- Gustavus Timothy, JP. For public services in Dominica.
- William Moore Todd, Drilling Superintendent, Water Development Department, Nyasaland.
- John Oswald Wadhams. For services to the Blind in Northern Rhodesia.
- Benjamin Chong Jen Wei, Secretary to Sibu Urban District Council, Sarawak.
- Willy Weidmann, Senior Land Assistant, Tanganyika.
- Florence Kathleen Wheeler. For public services in Hong Kong.

=== Order of the Companions of Honour (CH) ===
- The Reverend Charles Harold Dodd, Director of the recent translation of the New Testament.

=== Companion of the Imperial Service Order (ISO) ===
Home Civil Service

- Frederick William Baldock, MBE, lately Assistant Secretary, Admiralty (Harpenden, Hertfordshire).
- James Scott Cree, Superintending Surveyor, Ministry of Works (London, SW.17).
- Janet Neil Ralston Currie, HM Inspector of Factories, Class IA, Ministry of Labour (Glasgow, SI).
- John Dean, Regional Commissioner, National Saving Committee (Leeds, 8).
- Maurice Eastaugh, chief executive officer, Ministry of Pensions and National Insurance (Hatch End, Middlesex).
- Frederick William German, lately chief executive officer, Ministry of Agriculture, Fisheries and Food (Christchurch, Hampshire).
- Robert Scott Meldrum Gray, Deputy Finance Officer, Scottish Home Department (Edinburgh, 9).
- Horace Arthur Hewitt, chief executive officer, Ministry of Education (Harrow, Middlesex).
- Charles William Holt, Senior Chief Executive Officer, War Office (Croydon, Surrey).
- Alfred Howard, chief executive officer, Board of Trade (London, SW.19).
- Gwilym Jenkins, HM Senior District Inspector of Mines and Quarries, Ministry of Power (Nottingham).
- Lawrence Henry George Jewsbury, Principal, Ministry of Health (London, N.3).
- Thomas William Vernon Jones, Senior Principal Scientific Officer, Air Ministry (Bracknell, Berkshire).
- Jack Beresford Lacey, Principal Executive Officer, Post Office Savings Department, General Post Office (Surbiton, Surrey).
- John Collier McGill, chief executive officer, Home Office (Beckenham, Kent).
- Neil Edward MacKay, Assistant Chief Valuer (Scotland), Board of Inland Revenue (Edinburgh, 5).
- Stanley Talbot Lucas Mansell, Director of Air Technical Publications, Ministry of Aviation (Surbiton, Surrey).
- Eric Hazell Osborne, Principal, Export Credits Guarantee Department (Twickenham, Middlesex),
- William Frederick Redmond, MBE, lately Grade 2 Officer Branch B, Foreign Office (Barton-on-Sea, Hampshire).
- Leslie George Smith, Senior Chief Executive Officer, HM Stationery Office (Reigate, Surrey).
- Arthur Charles Albert Wanford, Collector, Harwich, Board of Customs and Excise (Dovercourt, Essex).
- Sam Burgess Williamson, chief executive officer, National Assistance Board, (Monkseaton, Northumberland).
- Joseph Cecil Hillis Woods, Chief Inspector, Ministry of Agriculture for Northern Ireland (Lisburn, County Antrim).

Australian States and Southern Rhodesia

- Archibald Duckworth Fraser, Director of Wild Life Conservation, Southern Rhodesia.
- Eric Poulson, Manager, Supply and Tender Department, and chairman, Supply and Tender Board, State of Tasmania.
- Clem Alaric Robinson, Chief Finance and Executive Officer, Western Australian Government Railways.
- Patrick Ryan, Director of Agriculture, State of Victoria.

Overseas Civil Service

- Arthur Alexander Abraham, Governor's Secretary and Clerk to the Executive Council, British Guiana.
- Thomas Attenborough, MBE, Superintendent of Prisons, Sarawak.
- Colin Cairns, assistant director of Marine (Port Control), Hong Kong.
- John Horace Griffiths, Chief Electrical and Mechanical Engineer, Tanganyika.
- Hugh White Nelson, Principal Labour Officer, Tanganyika.
- Aloysius Sequeira, MBE, lately Clerk of the Legislative Council, Aden.
- Alfred Harry Shrives, lately Controller of Savings Banks, East Africa High Commission.
- Charles Swain Thompson, MBE, lately Postmaster, Bahamas.

=== British Empire Medal (BEM) ===
Military Division

Royal Navy

- Chief Engineering Mechanic Edwin Richard Arnold, Q.991562, Royal Naval Reserve.
- Chief Wren Steward Irene Atkinson, 55672, Women's Royal Naval Service.
- Chief Electrical Artificer Frederick John Barber, P/MX 59083.
- Chief Petty Officer Joseph Bezzina, E/JX 145955.
- Chief Petty Officer Kenneth Charles Bridge, D/JX 152992.
- Chief Aircraft Artificer George William Carling, L/FX 87886.
- Radio Supervisor James Lionel Arthur Cauty, D/JX 453913.
- Chief Petty Officer Chan Chung Ying, HK O.772.
- Chief Petty Officer Arthur Edward Cockings, DSM, P/JX 130298.
- Stores Chief Petty Officer (V) Leslie James Coombs, C/MX 50691.
- Regimental Sergeant Major Arthur Leslie Cornish, Ply/X.2655, Royal Marines.
- Chief Electrical Artificer (Air) Frederick Leonard John Crouch, L/FX 75549.
- Chief Radio Electrician Alfred Noel Farley, P/MX 844458.
- Regimental Sergeant Major (T) Bernard Harry Fountain, Ch/X.1115, Royal Marines.
- Chief Radio Supervisor Raymond Gray, C/JX 150217.
- Chief Petty Officer (GI) Wilfred Gregory, P/JX 159808.
- Master at Arms Harry Griffin, P/MX 667895.
- Chief Petty Officer (AAI) Roland William Holton, L/FX 670083.
- Electrical Artificer First Class George Christopher Clive Jones, D/MX 888600, lately seconded to the Royal Australian Navy.
- Chief Petty Officer (Aircrewman 1) Stuart William Lock, DSM, L/FX 670014.
- Chief Petty Officer (GI) Francis Peter Maries, P/JX 181936.
- Chief Petty Officer (Steward) Kenneth Norman Mitchell, P/LX 23317.
- Engineering Mechanic First Class Joseph Hardy Nellies, D/K 946411.
- Sick Berth Chief Petty Officer John Rimer, P/MX 55740, lately seconded to the Royal Malayan Navy.
- Chief Engine Room Artificer Charles John Roberts, D/MX 49997.
- Chief Petty Officer (GI) George Robertson, P/JX 155564, lately seconded to the Royal Malayan Navy.
- Petty Officer Cook (S) Albert Sheaff, C/MX 107637.
- Chief Mechanician James Frederick Simmons, P/KX 540791.
- Chief Petty Officer (GI) Leonard Stock, P/JX 186826.
- Chief Engineering Mechanic William John Taylor, C/KX 94425.
- Colour Sergeant Bugler John Wagstaffe, Po/X.2406, Royal Marines.
- Chief Petty Officer Cook (S) Bertram Charles Widger, D/MX 54336.

Army

- 21124613 Sergeant Arthur Maxwell Bailes, Intelligence Corps.
- S/160489 Warrant Officer Class I (acting) Spencer Edwin George Bartlett, Royal Army Service Corps.
- Warrant Officer Class I Randolph Harrison Bennett, British Guiana Volunteer Force.
- T/22286563 Sergeant Roland Victor Betts, Royal Army Service Corps.
- 5505565 Staff-Sergeant (acting) William Richard Blake, Royal Army Pay Corps.
- 21019954 Staff-Sergeant (Artillery Clerk) Charles Staff-Sergeant (acting) Francis Albert Bowers, Royal Regiment of Artillery, Territorial Army.
- S/14462264 Staff-Sergeant Edward William Burroughs, Royal Army Service Corps.
- 19121399 Warrant Officer Class II (acting) Dennis James Chapman, Corps of Royal Electrical and Mechanical Engineers.
- 22206660 Lance-Corporal William Cameron Dair, The Fife and Forfar Yeomanry/Scottish Horse, Royal Armoured Corps, Territorial Army.
- T/2616131 Warrant Officer Class II (acting) John Dibble, Royal Army Service Corps.
- 22516602 Sergeant Alfred Henry Edwards, Inns of Court and City Yeomanry, Territorial Army.
- 1055917 Staff-Sergeant Arthur Leonard Edwards, Royal Corps of Signals, Territorial Army.
- 22809043 Staff-Sergeant (Artillery Clerk) Edward Thomas Evans, Royal Regiment of Artillery.
- 2614073 Warrant Officer Class II (acting) Jack Foster, MM, Grenadier Guards.
- 15004020 Staff-Sergeant (acting) William Edwin Gritt, Royal Army Pay Corps.
- 2657037 Sergeant John Herbert Gutteridge, MM, Coldstream Guards.
- 23523111 Warrant Officer Class II (local) Kenneth Bowen Harris, Welsh Guards.
- W/26953 Sergeant (acting) Molly Harrison, Women's Royal Army Corps.
- 2079533 Staff-Sergeant John Edward Hart, Corps of Royal Engineers.
- 19048259 Sergeant Royston Derrieck Harvey, Royal Army Ordnance Corps.
- 6976669 Sergeant John Patrick Hatchell, The Royal Inniskilling Fusiliers.
- T/14064003 Staff-Sergeant Francis William Healey, Royal Army Service Corps.
- W/340869 Warrant Officer Class II (acting) Ethel Alexander Henderson, Women's Royal Army Corps.
- 19010246 Staff-Sergeant (acting) Ronald Hirst, Corps of Royal Electrical and Mechanical Engineers.
- 22558250 Warrant Officer Class II (acting) Kenneth Thomas Horseman, Royal Army Ordnance Corps.
- LS/4186058 Sergeant Eric Trevor Jakeman, The Royal Welch Fusiliers.
- 22260017 Sergeant Leslie George Kingsland, Royal Regiment of Artillery.
- S/22272022 Sergeant Stanley Lawrence, Royal Army Service Corps.
- LS/6976674 Warrant Officer Class II (acting) John McDaid, The Royal Inniskilling Fusiliers.
- 2548233 Sergeant Kenneth William Middleton, Corps of Royal Electrical and Mechanical Engineers.
- 410043 Sergeant John Murray, 4th/7th Royal Dragoon Guards, Royal Armoured Corps.
- 22553672 Sergeant John Nixon, Royal Army Ordnance Corps, Territorial Army.
- T/14476140 Corporal Norman Richards Parks, Royal Army Service Corps.
- 22247675 Sergeant James Anthony Richardson, Royal Corps of Signals, formerly serving with the Ghana Army.
- 3769221 Sergeant John Riley, The King's Regiment (Liverpool), Territorial Army.
- 2548550 Staff-Sergeant Harold Rogers, Corps of Royal Electrical and Mechanical Engineers.
- 22771347 Staff-Sergeant (acting) Roy William Simmons, Royal Corps of Signals.
- 19040011 Matthew Smith, 2nd Green Jackets, The King's Royal Rifle Corps.
- 1628995 Sergeant (local) William Llewellyn Rosser Thomas, Royal Regiment of Artillery.
- 13122176 Staff-Sergeant Christopher Walsh, Royal Pioneer Corps.
- 33S3824 Sergeant Michael Walsh, Army Catering Corps.
- 22527556 Staff-Sergeant Alfred Thomas Welch, The Royal Warwickshire Regiment, Territorial Army.
- 1931987 Sergeant Jack Trevor Welsman, Corps of Royal Engineers.
- LS/4911888 Warrant Officer Class II (local) Edward Thomas Weston, Grenadier Guards.
- 22773360 Sergeant William Frederick Whiting, Corps of Royal Engineers.
- 22232381 Staff-Sergeant Kenneth Frank Wood, Royal Army Medical Corps.
- 14409620 Warrant Officer Class II (local) Ronald William Wright, Military Provost Staff Corps.
- T/2547330 Warrant Officer Class II (acting) Eric David Yorston, Royal Army Service Corps.
- 22201201 Sergeant Dennis Edgar Young, Corps of Royal Electrical and Mechanical Engineers, formerly on loan to the Government of the Federation of Malaya.

Royal Air Force

- 618006 Flight Sergeant Thomas Walter James Beasley.
- 590912 Flight Sergeant Ernest George Manley Beer.
- 574958 Flight Sergeant Terence Ernest James Flatt.
- 640893 Flight Sergeant (now Warrant Officer) Thomas Egerton Lowson.
- 976617 Flight Sergeant Bernard Francis McRann.
- 2661653 Flight Sergeant Williamina Ridley Miller, Women's Royal Auxiliary Air Force.
- 615103 Flight Sergeant Lancelot Mitchell.
- 986657 Flight Sergeant Thomas William Parmley.
- 579961 Flight Sergeant Norris George Poore.
- 532684 Flight Sergeant (now Warrant Officer) Benjamin Lyall Skea, Royal Air Force Regiment.
- 572456 Chief Technician Jack Bigmore.
- 2252633 Chief Technician James Ernest Chapman.
- 515364 Chief Technician Walter Leslie Cooke.
- 954054 Chief Technician John Samuel Humphreys.
- 906990 Chief Technician Leonard Thomas Archibald Matthews.
- 553371 Chief Technician Ronald John Declee Overy.
- 1351300 Chief Technician Bernard Wilfred Potts.
- 1435290 Chief Technician William Royce Quinlan.
- 576607 Chief Technician Leslie Walter Washington.
- 644871 Chief Technician Donald Roundell Youle.
- 550373 Chief Technician James Cambrai Zammett.
- 3502843 Sergeant Kenneth Adams.
- 592178 Sergeant Milton Amalric Anderson.
- 3088270 Sergeant Joseph Allen Ashton.
- 654673 Sergeant Harold Jesmond Bainbridge, Royal Auxiliary Air Force.
- 4011300 Sergeant Clement William Cater.
- 4071108 Sergeant Robert Davidson, Royal Air Force Regiment.
- 4027172 Sergeant Stanley Anthony Fennell.
- 3507939 Sergeant William Frank Floydd.
- 4133571 Sergeant Leslie Graham.
- 2443659 Sergeant Derek Sydney Hanson.
- 652367 Sergeant Arthur Knowles.
- 1321673 Sergeant Jack Francis Langridge.
- 579079 Sergeant John Easton Mackie.
- 2655127 Sergeant Dorothy Grace Midgley, Women's Royal Auxiliary Air Force.
- 579508 Sergeant Desmond Rose.
- 3503262 Sergeant Geoffrey Turner.
- 639263 Sergeant Clifford Welton Vessey.
- 4189287 Corporal Francis Albert Bacon.
- 3516772 Corporal Thomas Howard Coram.
- 4009095 Corporal Technician James McQuiston Shaw.
- 4047233 Acting Corporal Raymond Godfrey Russell.

Civil Division
United Kingdom

- John Allen, House Foreman, British Broadcasting Corporation, Belfast.
- James Anderson, Foreman Jointer, South of Scotland Electricity Board. (Edinburgh).
- Fred Andrews, Crane Driver, No. 14 Maintenance Unit, Royal Air Force, Carlisle.
- Harry Samuel Andrews, Foreman, Parks Department, Borough of Southend-on-Sea.
- William Armstrong, General Foreman, Dove Bros Ltd. For services in the building of Guildford Cathedral. (Reading).
- Wilfred Herbert Aynsley, Sub-Officer, Herefordshire Fire Brigade. (Leominster).
- John Ambrose Ball, Foreman, East Midlands Electricity Board. (Coventry).
- Leonard John Barber, Head Warden, Civil Defence Corps, Canterbury.
- Ernest George Joseph Bates, Civilian Instructor, No. 766 (Archbishop Tenison's Grammar School) Squadron, Air Training Corps. (Surbiton, Surrey).
- Albert Bayman, Chief Inspector, Lancashire Constabulary. (Liverpool).
- Thomas Beeley, Meter Tester, No. 3 (Sheffield) Sub-Area, Yorkshire Electricity Board.
- George Atkinson Benson, Foreman Cheesemaker, Aspatria Creamery, Cumberland.
- John Frederick Bishopp, General Foreman, Engineering Department, Dover Harbour Board.
- Victor Bowen, Temporary Draughtsman, Higher Grade, Board of Trade. (London, SW.19).
- Nancy Bradbury, Centre Organiser, Brownhills, Staffordshire Women's Voluntary Service.
- Eric Jean Bradshaw, Leading Observer, Post 31/F.3, No. 31 Group, Royal Observer Corps. (Dundrum, County Down).
- John Willie Breen, Foreman, Joseph Steel & Sons Ltd., Bingley, Yorkshire.
- Alfred John Britt, Inspector, Metropolitan Police. (South Harrow, Middlesex).
- Alexander Brown, Head Janitor, Graeme High School, Falkirk.
- David James Brown, Head Lampman, Groesfaen Colliery, South Western Division, National Coal Board. (Bargoed).
- Norman John Brown, Surveyor, Grade III, Ordnance Survey Department. (Surbiton, Surrey).
- Edward James Glinn Butler, Instructor, Civil Defence Corps, Plymouth.
- John Clark Button, Head Foreman Engineer, Tyne Dock Engineering Co. Ltd., South Shields.
- Anthony Julian Camilleri. In charge of NAAFI Warehouse, Malta.
- Alfred Carter, Electrician Wireman, J. I. Thornycroft & Co. Ltd., Southampton.
- William Henry Caton, Postal and Telegraph Officer, General Post Office. (London, E.8).
- Harry Leonard John Chandler, Donkeyman, SS Benveoch, Ben Line Steamers Ltd. (Dunfermline, Fife).
- Edward George Isaac Chard, Leading Ammunition Storeman, Admiralty. (Lympstone, Devon).
- William Henry Cheeseman, Sub-Postmaster, Minster Post Office, Ramsgate, Kent.
- William David Chopping, Goods Guard, Eastern Region, British Railways. (Barkingside, Essex).
- George Douglas Clapperton, Commandant, Oxfordshire Special Constabulary. (Sandford-on-Thames).
- Lionel Claydon, Station Officer, St. Agnes, HM Coastguard, Ministry of Transport.
- Ethel Cole, Honorary Collector, Albert Road Savings Group, Coleford, Gloucester.
- Ernest Martin Cope, Dust and Ventilation Sampler, Mansfield Colliery, East Midlands Division, National Coal Board.
- Jack Leslie Cross, Instructor, Duchess of Gloucester House, Ministry of Labour. (Isleworth, Middlesex).
- Christopher Curry, Assistant Engine and Exhausterman, North Shields Gas Works, Northern Gas Board. (Tynemouth).
- Elizabeth Cussons, Centre Organiser, Wolverton Urban District, Women's Voluntary Service.
- Emrys Alfred Davies, Postman, Head Post Office, Aberdare.
- Richard Deakin, Chargehand Joiner, United Kingdom Atomic Energy Authority, Risley. (Warrington).
- William George Dixson, Chargehand, Signals Research and Development Establishment, Ministry of Aviation. (Christchurch, Hampshire).
- William Peter Donovan, Foreman, Stern & Bell Ltd., Birmingham.
- Robert Dunlop, Ambulance Driver, St. Andrew's and Red Cross Scottish Ambulance Service, Glasgow.
- John Dunn (Senior), Head Shepherd, Kidlandlee Estate, Morpeth, Northumberland.
- Hugh Fanning, Supplies Superintendent, General Post Office. (London, N.17).
- Eva Kathleen Ford, Sub-Postmistress, Newtownbutler, Enniskillen, County Fermanagh.
- Robert Fraser, DCM, Clerk of Works, No. 21 Maintenance Unit, Royal Air Force, Fauld. (Lichfield).
- Aileen French, Honorary Collector, Street Savings Groups, North Kensington, London.
- George Edward Gait, Foreman, Kelvin & Hughes Ltd., Glasgow. (Oldhall, Renfrewshire).
- John McEwen Gardiner, Engineering Technical Class, Grade II, No. 1 Ground Radio Servicing Squadron, Royal Air Force, Kinloss. (Forres).
- Thomas Samuel Gardner, Superintendent of Main Sewers, Middlesex County Council.
- Murray Richard Giles, Sergeant Armourer, Combined Cadet Force, Charterhouse. (Godalming, Surrey).
- Dick Glaister, Ward Orderly, Whitehaven Hospital, Cumberland.
- Hugh Graham, Caretaker, Territorial Army Centre, Coleraine, County Londonderry.
- Alexander McKenzie Grant, Boatswain MV Hadrian Coast, Aberdeen Steam Navigation Co. Ltd. (Culter, Aberdeenshire).
- Frank Graves, Sub-Officer, Cambridgeshire Fire Brigade. (Cottenham).
- Richard Frederick Griffin, General Foreman, Refrigerator Factory, AEI Hotpoint Ltd., Peterborough.
- Harry Thomas Edwin Grubb, Foreman of Trades, No. 15 Maintenance Unit, Royal Air Force, Wroughton. (Swindon, Wiltshire).
- Victor William Grundy, First Class Gasfitter, Sheffield District, East Midlands Gas Board.
- John Hadden, Head Constable, Royal Ulster Constabulary. (Belfast).
- Douglas Hall, Chief Inspector, Manchester, General Post, Office.
- Leslie Edward George Hallier, Workshop Superintendent, 14 Command Workshops, War Office. (Ashford, Kent).
- Henry Hamlen, Instructor, Civil Defence Corps, Bath.
- George Morrison Hanson, Salvage and General Worker, Denaby Main Colliery, North Eastern Division, National Coal Board. (Mexborough, Yorkshire).
- William Foster Norman Harding, Postman, Higher Grade, Head Post Office, Exeter.
- Henry Albert Hare, Foreman of Despatch Department, Beldam Asbestos Co. Ltd., Hounslow.
- Cyril Harris, Overman (Special Duties), Donisthorpe Colliery, East Midlands Division, National Coal Board. (Burton-on-Trent).
- Robert John Harte, Sub-District Commandant, Ulster Special Constabulary. (Londonderry).
- Percy Claud Harvey, Wardmaster, Royal Hospital, Chelsea.
- Eva Hatton, Honorary Collector, Street Savings Groups, Lymm, Cheshire.
- Cyril Ivan Towers Hawkins, Hospital Attendant, SS Pretoria Castle, British and Commonwealth Shipping Co. Ltd. (Croydon, Surrey).
- John James Hazelwood, Engineering Assistant, Grade II, Ministry of Works. (Bristol).
- Reginald Ernest Frank Hellyar, Production Inspector, Grade II, Admiralty. (Fareham, Hampshire).
- Stanley Wallace Hemming, Senior Steward, Boeing 707 Flight, British Overseas Airways Corporation. (Heston, Middlesex).
- John Henderson, Overman, Cardowan Colliery, Scottish Division, National Coal Board. (Chryston).
- Benjamin W. Highley, Wire Drawer, Bruntons (Musselburgh) Ltd. (Musselburgh).
- Mary Ellen Hobbs, Honorary Collector, Village Savings Group, Salisbury.
- William Holmes, Deputy, Arley Colliery, West Midlands Division, National Coal Board.
- George William Charles Holt, Senior Assistant (Scientific), Department of Zoology, British Museum (Natural History). (Hounslow, Middlesex).
- Menduh Hussein, Supervisory Storekeeper, War Office, Cyprus.
- Albert Irons, Supervisory Foreman, Paddington (Isleworth, Middlesex) Goods Station, British Railways. (London, W.12).
- Thomas Ithell, Assistant Divisional Officer, Cheshire Fire Brigade. (Chester).
- Annie Mary Jackson, Honorary Collector, Street Savings Groups, Spennymoor, County Durham.
- Ernest Johnston, Road Passenger Inspector, Ulster Transport Authority. (Belfast).
- Thomas Johnstone, Sergeant-Major-Instructor, Dumfries Independent Company, Dumfries-shire Army Cadet Force.
- Alan Jones, Technical Works Engineer, Grade III, GCHQ, Foreign Office. (Cheltenham, Gloucestershire).
- Emily Hughes Jones, Honorary Collector, Pretoria Terrace and Priory Street Savings Group, Caernarvon.
- Ivy Kathleen Jones, Senior Chief Supervisor (F), Continental Telephone Exchange, General Post Office. (London, SE.26).
- John Samuel Jones, Mail Contractor, Head Post Office, Pwllheli.
- William Henry Keith, Coastguardsman, Arbroath, HM Coastguard, Ministry of Transport.
- Marjorie Adeline Kingdon, Convoy Organiser, Food Flying Squad, SW Region. (Bristol).
- James Herbert Knight, Technician, Class I, London Telecommunications Region, General Post Office. (Wembley, Middlesex).
- Alexander Kyle, Youth Leader, Drumry and District Community Centre Youth Club, Dunbartonshire.
- Mary Laing, Clothing Organiser, Aberdeen City, Women's Voluntary Service.
- Herbert Lambert, Senior Foreman, Hammersmith District, London Electricity Board. (Hounslow West, Middlesex).
- Lawrence Lavelle, Composite Worker, Ashington Colliery, Northern (N & C) Division, National Coal Board.
- John William Leach, Office Keeper, Grade II, Commonwealth Relations Office. (London, W.19).
- Neville Page Lear, Head Foreman, Cammell Laird & Co. Ltd., Birkenhead. (Bebington, Cheshire).
- William Frederick Leaver, Sergeant of Constabulary, Royal Botanic Gardens, Kew. (Richmond, Surrey).
- Molly Lever, Supervisor of Sorting Assistants, Savings Department, General Post Office. (Greenford, Middlesex).
- Brian Linsley, Marker Out, Ambrose Shardlow & Co. Ltd., Sheffield.
- May Livesley, Housekeeper, Farnborough Grange Hostel, Ministry of Aviation.
- George Ernest Long, AFM, Non-Technical, Grade II, Royal Aircraft Establishment, Cardington. (Bedford).
- Helen Lonsdale, Warden, Junior Fleet Club, Rochester.
- Frederick Henry Luff, Workshop Foreman, 28 Command Workshops, War Office. (Shanklin, Isle of Wight).
- Sarah McCabe, Honorary Collector, Street Savings Group, Belfast.
- Hugh McCaughtrie, Foreman, Summerfield Research Station, Kidderminster.
- Henry McIntosh, Postman, Head Post Office, Lowgate, Hull.
- David MacKay, Chief Officer, Class II, HM Prison, Barlinnie, Glasgow.
- James McKim, Foreman, G. & J. Weir Ltd., Glasgow.
- Francis Martin, Foreman, RAOC Traffic Branch, War Office, Gibraltar.
- Herbert Frank Martin, Chief Paperkeeper, Admiralty. (Taunton).
- William George Mason, Head Foreman Welder, Vickers-Armstrongs (Engineers) Ltd., Barrow-in-Furness. (Dalton-in-Furness).
- Finlay Matheson, Chief Observer, Post 30/S4, No. 30 Group, Royal Observer Corps. (Brora, Sutherland).
- Kochuthundyil Varkey Mathews, Chief Overseer, HM Naval Base, Singapore.
- William Melville, Sub-Officer, Western Area Fire Brigade, Gourock.
- Sydney Grenville Millbourne, Chargehand, Associated British Combustion Ltd., Southampton.
- James Miller, Station Master, Oxford, British Railways.
- John Miller, Chief Inspector, War Department Constabulary, Bramley Central Ammunition Depot. (Bramley, Hampshire).
- Richard Harry Mills, Research and Development Craftsman Special, Royal Aircraft Establishment, Farnborough.
- John Alfred Moody, Technical Officer, Telephone Manager's Office, Tunbridge Wells.
- George Morris, lately Civilian Warrant Officer, No. 1279 (Melton Mowbray) Squadron, Air Training Corps. (Melton Mowbray, Leicestershire).
- John Alfred Murden, Workshops Foreman, Proof and Experimental Establishment, Pendine, War Office.
- Haski Farah Nalayeh, Works Supervisor, Grade I, Royal Air Force Steamer Point, Aden.
- Herbert Henry Neil, Leading Hand, Bristol Aircraft Ltd.
- Alexander Olmer, Chancery Messenger, HM Embassy, Prague.
- Frank Osborne, Warden, Bury Lads' Club.
- Alfred Edward Palmer, Foreman Fitter, Royal Ordnance Factory, Glascoed. (Pontypool, Monmouthshire).
- Athelstan Gildus Panter, Head Warden, Civil Defence Corps, Bredbury and Romiley Urban District, Cheshire.
- Reginald Alfred Pawson, Non-Technical, Grade II, United Kingdom Atomic Energy Authority, Winfrith. (Dorchester, Dorset).
- I. C. Paxton, Branch Divisional Therapist, British Red Cross Society (Scottish Branch). (Lundin Links, Fife).
- Marjorie Pearson, Honorary Collector, Clevedon Road Savings Group, Newport, Monmouthshire.
- Ethel May Percival, Manageress, NAAFI Junior Ranks Club, Bordon, Hampshire.
- Frank Phillips, JP, Ripper and Contract Worker, Bickershaw Colliery, North Western Division, National Coal Board.
- Arthur Herbert Price, Court Crier, Supreme Court, Northern Ireland. (Belfast).
- Annie Pulford. For services as a foster mother in East Suffolk. (Kelsale, Suffolk).
- Charlie Jeffries Pullen, Chief Locomotive Running Inspector, Paddington Station, British Railways. (Swindon).
- Stanley Ramsey, Chief Steward, tanker Methane Pioneer, General Service, Stephenson Clarke Ltd. (South Shields).
- Frederick Charles Rawlings, Yard Foreman, Cardiff Power Station, South Wales Division, Central Electricity Generating Board.
- Nini Redgrave, Centre Organiser, Frome Urban District, Women's Voluntary Service.
- William Robert Reed, Foreman of Navvies, Guest Keen Iron & Steel Co. Ltd., Cardiff.
- Harry Ernest Richards, Model Shop Foreman, Decca Radar Ltd., Tolworth. (Kingston upon Thames, Surrey).
- Alexander Phillip's Robertson, Technical Officer, General Post Office, Edinburgh. (Haddington, East Lothian).
- Donald Robertson, MM, Verger, Saint Andrew's Garrison Church, Aldershot.
- Felix Wilson Rogers, Senior Assistant (Scientific), Admiralty. (Portsmouth).
- Hedley Edward Roper, Chief Engineer, Maintenance Department, Church Commissioners for England. (London, SE.25).
- Jessie Ross, Voluntary Worker, Liverpool Blood Transfusion Service.
- Roderick MacLeod Ross, Sub-Postmaster, Edinbane, Portree, Isle of Skye.
- Stanley Royle, Warden, Hillsborough Boys' Club, Sheffield.
- William John Salmon, Warden, Hatfield Youth Club, Hertfordshire.
- Eric Stanley Sanders, Chief Inspector, Warwickshire Constabulary. (Nuneaton).
- Tom Saunders, Superintendent and Male Staff Supervisor, Male Poor Law Department, General Hospital, Jersey.
- Albert Sayles, Superintendent Gardener, Dyffryn Gardens, Glamorgan County Council. (Cardiff).
- Stanley Scott, Foreman Millwright, South Durham Steel & Iron Co. Ltd. (West Hartlepool).
- Frederick James Seabrook, Senior Assistant, Rothamsted Experimental Station, Harpenden.
- Mary Severn, Overseer, Munrospun Ltd., Edinburgh.
- Gladys Short, County Staff Officer for Civil Defence, Women's Voluntary Service, Lincolnshire, Parts of Lindsey. (Gainsborough).
- Phillip Alfred Simmonds, Leading Electrical Engineering Assistant, War Office. (London, SE.2).
- Leonard Simpson, Travelling Chief Inspector, South Western Region Headquarters, General Post Office. (Romsey, Hampshire).
- Oliver James Skeet, Chargeman of Fitters (Hired), RN Armament Depot, Dean Hill. (Salisbury).
- Howard Frederick Smallwood, lately Chocolate Production Worker, Cadbury Bros. (Birmingham).
- George Smith, Safety Engineer, Buxton Lime Works, Imperial Chemical Industries Ltd. (Chapel-en-le-Frith, Cheshire).
- Stephen Stallybrass, Radio Technician, London Airport, Ministry of Aviation. (Hayes, Middlesex).
- John Henry Stammers, Supervisor (Telegraph), Head Post Office, Leeds.
- Arthur Stray, Dragline Driver, Lindsey and Holland Agricultural Executive Committee. (Boston, Lincolnshire).
- Leonard Syder, Ministry of Agriculture, Fisheries and Food Market Reporter, King's Lynn, Norfolk.
- Charles Wilfred Sykes, 2nd Assistant Engineer (Construction), Eastern Electricity Board. (St. Neots, Huntingfordshire).
- William John Taylor, Pressureman, Mersey Group, North Western Gas Board. (Liverpool).
- Albert Edward Tolfree, Assistant Foreman, Hawker Aircraft Ltd., Kingston upon Thames. (Hampton, Middlesex).
- Bernard Travers, Caretaker, Fofanny Reservoir, County Down. (Newry).
- Cyril Kimberley Trezise, Principal Keeper, Withernsea Lighthouse, Corporation of Trinity House.
- Albert Edward Tuck, Senior Attendant, Royal Courts of Justice. (London, N.1).
- Salvatore David Ventura, Engine Driver, RN Hospital, Malta.
- Frederick Washer, Chief, Officer, Class I, HM Prison, Stafford.
- Stewart McDougal Watson, Extrusion Toolroom Turner, Alcan Industries Ltd. (Newport, Monmouthshire).
- Mabel Wilkinson, Centre Organiser, Leighton Buzzard Urban District, Women's Voluntary Service. (Heath and Reach, Bedfordshire).
- Arthur George Thomas Woodwards, Horticultural Marketing Officer, Grade B, Ministry of Agriculture, Fisheries and Food. (Tunbridge Wells, Kent).
- George Henry Wootton, Plaster Orderly, Lister Hospital, Hitchin.
- George Edward Wraith, Pumpman, SS San Ernesto, Shell Tankers Ltd. (Newcastle upon Tyne).
- Stuart Wyatt, Divisional Commander, Hampshire Special Constabulary. (Fareham).

State of New South Wales

- Thomas Acquinas Kelly, Officer-in-Charge, Hay Irrigation Area, Water Conservation Commission.

State of Victoria

- David John Freeland, Conductor, Victorian Railways.
- Walter Peeler, VC, Custodian of the Shrine of Remembrance, Melbourne.

State of South Australia

- Joseph Leonard Holland, Chief Warder, HM Gaol, Adelaide.

Southern Rhodesia

- Frank James Abrahams, Senior Driver to the Prime Minister.
- Harry Bradshaw, lately Superintendent of African Hospitals, Bulawayo.
- Frank Elms, Yard Foreman, Central Mechanical Equipment Department.

Basutoland

- Elizabeth Boloko, lately Staff Nurse, Nursing Service.
- Joel Molapo, Senior Clerk, Agency for the High Commission Territories at Johannesburg.

Swaziland

- Norman Stanley Bouchier, Senior Stock Inspector, Department of Land Utilization.

Overseas Territories

- Ahmed Salem Ahmed, Head Cook, Government House, Aden.
- Randolph Gillford Perry, Plant Superintendent, Electricity Ice and Cold Storage Department, Antigua.
- Gladys Coltress, Head Cook, "The Palms" Almshouse, British Guiana.
- Violet Wilhelmina Card, Operating Theatre Sister, Belize Hospital, British Honduras.
- Joash Price Joel, Permanent Way Inspector Grade IV, Engineering Department, East Africa High Commission.
- Seyfu Sader Maneh, Seyfu (Chief) of Niani District, MacCarthy Island Division, Gambia.
- Jasper Endymian Lawrence, Works Overseer Grade I, Ministry of Communications and Works, Jamaica.
- Yves Napoleon Payet, District Assistant, Nairobi, Kenya.
- Joseph Mary Muscat, Printing Manager, Department of Information, Malta.
- Solomon Mulando, Head Messenger, Broken Hill Rural District, Northern Rhodesia.
- Euphemia Martha Cameron, Matron, Coloured Children's Hostel, Limbe, Nyasaland.
- Charles Frederick Williams, Surgical Dresser, Public Health Department, St. Helena.
- Guildford Lafargue, Head Teacher, Saltibus Village School, Saint Lucia.
- David Luther Timax King, Chief Mechanic, Public Works Department, St. Vincent.
- Jahar bin Man, Senior member of Household Staff, Government House, Sarawak.
- Wilfroid Eddison Larsen, Engine-Room Mechanic, Public Works Department, Seychelles.
- Philip Silas Mganga, Senior Medical Assistant, Medical Department, Tanganyika.
- Ekapolon Enosi Nameu, lately County Chief, Jie County, Karamoja, Uganda.
- Isabella Morris, Assistant Teacher, Grade II, Carrot Bay, Virgin Islands.
- Billy Pilua, Chief Boatswain, Marine Department, British Solomon Islands Protectorate, Western Pacific.

=== Royal Victorian Medal (RVM) ===
In Silver

- Wilfred George Bridges.
- John Cavlan.
- Geoffrey Charles William Clayton.
- Horace Crisp.
- Chief Petty Officer Electrician Albert Edwards, P/MX 759574.
- Police Constable Roy Reginald Hanlon, Metropolitan Police.
- Frederick Stanley Mates.
- Edith Janet Moody.
- Michael William Murray.
- William John Prater.
- Frederick Arthur Rutland.
- Yeoman Bed Goer George Arthur Scarff, Her Majesty's Bodyguard of the Yeomen of the Guard.
- Chief Petty Officer Engineering Mechanic Joseph Samuel Shaw, P/KX 85509.
- Richard Short.
- Albert Tripp.
- Lilian Gertrude Webber.

=== Royal Red Cross (RRC) ===
- Olive Mary Molyneaux, ARRC, Matron, Queen Alexandra's Royal Naval Nursing Service.
- Lieutenant-Colonel (temporary) Margaret Mary Trood (215612), Queen Alexandra's Royal Army Nursing Corps.

==== Associate of the Royal Red Cross (ARRC) ====
- Mary Stella Fetherston-Dilke, Superintending Sister, Queen Alexandra's Royal Naval Nursing Service.
- Lieutenant-Colonel Ailleen Mary Eugenie Barkley (209765), Queen Alexandra's Royal Army Nursing Corps, Territorial Army.
- Captain Sarah Alice Bindloss (399775), Queen Alexandra's Royal Army Nursing Corps.
- Major Sylvia Charles Burnett (206761), Queen Alexandra's Royal Army Nursing Corps.
- Squadron Officer Jeannie Eleanora May Kennedy (405329), Princess Mary's Royal Air Force Nursing Service.
- Flight Officer Annie McPhail (406699), Princess Mary's Royal Air Force Nursing Service.

=== Air Force Cross (AFC) ===
Royal Navy

- Lieutenant-Commander Thomas Clifford Evans.

Royal Air Force

- Group Captain Kenneth Ritchley.
- Wing Commander Neville John Carver (126654).
- Squadron Leader Roy Langstaff (4040354).
- Squadron Leader Robert Ramirez (1818026).
- Flight Lieutenant Douglas Stuart Bridson (3123583).
- Flight Lieutenant Peter Spencer Collins, (2600765).
- Flight Lieutenant Donald Arthur Cooper (607202).
- Flight Lieutenant John Dormand Gibson (3051488).
- Flight Lieutenant Brian James Lemon (2608281).
- Flight Lieutenant Harold Douglas Moseley (59635).
- Plight Lieutenant Alfred Claude Musgrove (185872).
- Flight Lieutenant Roy Douglas Stone (4065520).
- Flight Lieutenant Harvey Horace Thompson (51124).
- Flight Lieutenant Francis Leonard Travers-Smith (2438980).

==== Bar to Air Force Cross ====
Royal Air Force

- Flight Lieutenant William Henry Evans, DFC, AFC, (188950).

=== Air Force Medal (AFM) ===
Royal Air Force

- 3051193 Flight Sergeant George William Edward Foster.
- 4008223 Flight Sergeant Patrick William Lawson.
- 4140186 Sergeant Bruce Kitchener.

=== Queen's Commendation for Valuable Service in the Air ===
Royal Navy

- Lieutenant-Commander Trevor Edgar Mount Kirby.

Royal Air Force

- Wing Commander Alan Cyril Davies (151820).
- Squadron Leader Derrick Adams (501033).
- Squadron Leader Brian James Ball, DFC, (579588).
- Squadron Leader Kenneth Alfred Hutchings, (180378).
- Squadron Leader Peter Anthony Latham, AFC, (57736).
- Squadron Leader Robert John Linford (193370).
- Squadron Leader Kenneth Smith (56941).
- Flight Lieutenant Anthony Bradshaw, DFC, (144012).
- Flight Lieutenant Thomas Jack Fairbrass (194282).
- Flight Lieutenant John Edward Freer (1578945).
- Flight Lieutenant Brian William Gill (4063924).
- Flight Lieutenant Ronald Albert Gillam (190945).
- Flight Lieutenant Herbert Leslie Howes (582250).
- Flight Lieutenant Gordon Leon Johnson (3508077).
- Flight Lieutenant Granville Jones (2500940).
- Flight Lieutenant Norman Lamb (3504742).
- Flight Lieutenant Victor McNabney, GM, (3225076).
- Flight Lieutenant Charles Edward Slater, DFC, (1305635).
- Flight Lieutenant Thomas William Smail, DFC, (136863).
- Flight Lieutenant Derek Alec Spackman (4036277).
- Flying Officer Geoffrey Edward Grimsdale (3031691).
- Flying Officer Jack Arthur Richardson (1805730).
- Master Pilot Hubert James Blackwell (1609215).
- Master Engineer James Albert Higgins (644311).
- 3038694 Flight Sergeant Russell Leslie Turner.

United Kingdom

- Morris Edward Hearn, Senior Pilot, Land's End, British European Airways Corporation.
- John William Reid, DFC, First Officer, Helicopter Experimental Unit, British European Airways Corporation.

Overseas Territories

- Ithel Frank Cadwallader, Pilot, Ministry of Lands, Surveys and Water, Tanganyika.
- Allan William Simpson, Chief Pilot, Ministry of Lands, Surveys and Water, Tanganyika.

=== Queen's Police Medal (QPM) ===
England and Wales

- Alec Andrew Muir, Chief Constable, Durham County Constabulary.
- John Albert Taylor, MBE, Chief Constable, Leicestershire and Rutland Constabulary.
- Edward Barker, Chief Constable, Bolton Borough Police.
- Arthur Townsend, MBE, BEM, Commander, Metropolitan Police.
- Arthur James Broomfield, Assistant Chief Constable, Hampshire Constabulary.
- William Henry Linaker, MBE, Assistant Chief Constable, Lancashire Constabulary.
- Frederick John Blake, GM, Chief Superintendent, Metropolitan Police.
- George Woodcock, BEM, Chief Superintendent, West Riding Constabulary.
- George Gaius James Burton, Chief Superintendent, Kent County Constabulary.
- Redvers Henry Keller, Superintendent, Wiltshire Constabulary.
- John Joseph Lowe, Superintendent, Newcastle upon Tyne City Police.
- William Frank Gilbert, Superintendent, Metropolitan Police.

Scotland

- John Ritchie Inch, CBE, Chief Constable, Edinburgh City Police.
- James Reid Kelso, Chief Superintendent, Glasgow City Police.

Northern Ireland

- Joseph Samuel Brown, Head Constable, Royal Ulster Constabulary.

State of New South Wales

- Leslie William Moore, Superintendent 2nd Class, New South Wales Police Force.
- Joseph Hubert Buck, Superintendent 2nd Class, New South Wales Police Force.
- Norman Joseph Scholtz, Superintendent 3rd Class, New South Wales Police Force.
- Russell James O'Neill, Superintendent 3rd Class, New South Wales Police Force.
- Donald Charles Dallas, Inspector 1st Class, New South Wales Police Force.
- Frank Ross Clark, Inspector 1st Class, New South Wales Police Force.

Southern Rhodesia

- Frank Eric Barfoot, Deputy Commissioner, British South Africa Police.

Overseas Territories

- Edward Caston Eates, Commissioner of Police, Gambia.
- John Frederick Barton, Deputy Commissioner of Police, Gibraltar.
- Mervyn Colet Manby, Senior Assistant, Commissioner of Police, Kenya.
- Ian Scott Paton, Assistant Commissioner of Police, Tanganyika.
- Ronald Thomas Cooper, Senior Assistant Commissioner of Police, Tanganyika.

=== Queen's Fire Services Medal (QFSM) ===
England and Wales

- Robert Leonard Leach, Chief Officer, Dorset Fire Brigade.
- Albert Edward Harris, Divisional Officer, Middlesex Fire Brigade.
- John Henry Smethurst, Chief Officer, Barrow-in-Furness Fire Brigade.
- Sidney Herbert Boulter, Assistant Chief Officer, Worcestershire and Worcester Fire Brigade.

Scotland

- Malcolm Stewart Hume, lately Divisional Officer, South Western Area Fire Brigade.

State of New South Wales

- James Sutherland Jappy, Executive Officer, New South Wales Fire Brigades.
- Charles Patrick Holdom, District Officer, New South Wales Fire Brigades.
- Arthur William Lattimer, Station Officer, New South Wales Fire Brigades.
- James Patrick Rodgers, Captain, South Broken Hill Volunteer Fire Brigade.

=== Colonial Police Medal (CPM) ===
Southern Rhodesia

- John Ernest Barton, Superintendent, British South Africa Polite.
- George William Kay, Staff Chief Inspector, British South Africa Police.
- George Gainforth Lee, Superintendent, British Soutih Africa Police.
- Mabandi, Station Sergeant, British South Africa Police.
- Michael Ritchie Murray, Assistant Superintendent, British South Africa Police.
- Nikolosi, First Sergeant, British South Africa Police.
- Taruvinga, Station Sergeant, British South Africa Police.

Bechuanaland Protectorate

- John Douglas Sheard King, Assistant Superintendent, Bechuanaland Protectorate Police Force.
- Tshipikgaro Heboldboro Motlhatlhedi, Warrant Officer, Class II, Bechuanaland Protectorate Police Force.

Overseas Territories

- Mukanani Akalilwa, Detective Assistant Inspector Grade II, Northern Rhodesia Police Force.
- Samuson Akoko, Acting Sub-Inspector, Uganda Police Force.
- Vincent Harold John Anderson, Acting Senior Superintendent, Gambia Police Force.
- Ernest Joseph Brice, Assistant Superintendent, Uganda Police Force.
- Samuel Emmanuel Browne, Inspector, Trinidad Police Force.
- Vincent Allenby Bunting, Superintendent, Jamaica Police Force.
- Foua Fuafanua, Sub-Inspector, Gilbert and Ellice Islands Constabulary.
- John Augustine Garland, Assistant Superintendent, Kenya Police Force.
- John Foster Graham, MBE, Commandant, Special Constabulary, Jamaica.
- Stanley Ernest Gullidge, Superintendent, Fiji Police Force.
- David Villiers Hewson, Assistant Superintendent, Kenya Police Force.
- Munyao Isika, Sergeant, Kenya Police Force.
- Robert Graham James, Assistant Superintendent, Kenya Police Force.
- John Kasoka, Detective Sub-Inspector, Northern Rhodesia Police Force.
- Bakari Khatibu, Inspector Grade II, Kenya Police Force.
- Kitengita Kisili, Sergeant, Kenya Police Force.
- Jack Lapsky, Inspector, Hong Kong Auxiliary Police Force.
- George Charles Augustus Lavell, OBE, Superintendent, Bahamas Police Force.
- Arthur John Eric Longden, Senior Superintendent, British Guiana Police Force.
- Idi Masanga, Sergeant, Kenya Police Force.
- Ernest Kachu Mulabi, Acting Assistant Superintendent, Uganda Police Force.
- Benjamin Ochieno, Assistant Superintendent, Uganda Police Force.
- Johannes Ongoro Okumu, Inspector Grade II, Kenya Police Force.
- Omari Efron, Sergeant, Tanganyika Police Force.
- Apollo Stephano Orengo, Inspector Grade I, Kenya Police Force.
- Jean Raoul Picot, Inspector, Mauritius Police Force.
- Ian Lionel Puttock, Senior Superintendent, British Guiana Police Force.
- Francis Owen McDonough Renaud, Assistant Superintendent, Mauritius Police Force.
- Lionel Renie, Divisional Officer, Fire Services, Trinidad.
- Salum Ali, Sub-Inspector, Tanganyika Police Force.
- Salim Slim Salim, Assistant Superintendent, Zanzibar Police Force.
- Girwood Campbell Springer, Superintendent, Trinidad Police Force.
- Ahmed Abdullah Suheibi, Chief Inspector, Aden Police Force.
- Joseph Ben Thombozi, Detective Sub-Inspector Grade I, Nyasaland Police Force.
- John William Wardraugh Walne, Deputy Superintendent, North Borneo Police Force.
- Raymond Frederick George White, Superintendent, Hong Kong Police Force.
- Harry Saltoun Woodhouse, Senior Superintendent, Kenya Police Force.
- Yeung Yuk-shing, Sergeant, Hong Kong Police Force.

== Australia ==
=== Knight Bachelor ===
- Norman John Carson, CMG, of Kew, Victoria. For services to Australian industry.
- Brigadier Donald Mackinnon Cleland, CBE, Administrator of the Territory of Papua and New Guinea.
- Ian Douglas Miller, MB, FRCS, President of the Royal Australasian College of Surgeons.
- Charles Joseph Alfred Moses, CBE, General Manager, Australian Broadcasting Commission.

=== Order of the Bath ===
==== Companion of the Order of the Bath (CB) ====
Military Division

- Major-General Ronald Eustace Wade, CBE, (3/50), Australian Staff Corps.

=== Order of Saint Michael and Saint George ===
==== Companion of the Order of St Michael and St George (CMG) ====
- The Right Reverend Ernest Henry Burgmann, formerly Bishop of Canberra and Goulburn.
- Gordon Colvin Lindesay Clark, MC, President, Australasian Institute of Mining and Metallurgy.
- Bert Meecham, OBE, of Peppermint Grove, Western Australia. For services to the Australian manufacturing industry.
- Frederick Hood Peacock, of Sandy Bay, Tasmania. For services to Australian commerce and industry.

=== Order of the British Empire ===
==== Knight Commander of the Order of the British Empire (KBE) ====
Military Division

- Lieutenant-General Reginald George Pollard, CB, CBE, DSO, (2/14), Australian Staff Corps.

Civil Division

- The Honourable Oliver Howard Beale, QC, Her Majesty's Australian Ambassador Extraordinary and Plenipotentiary to the United States of America.

==== Commander of the Order of the British Empire (CBE) ====
Military Division

- Rear-Admiral Otto Humphrey Becker, DSO, DSC, Royal Australian Navy.
- Brigadier Donald George McKenzie, OBE, (3/82), Australian Staff Corps.
- Group Captain Ivor James Roberts, Royal Australian Air Force.

Civil Division

- John Cluny McPherson Harkness, President, Footwear Manufacturers' Federal Council.
- Elisabeth Joy, Lady Murdoch, President of the Committee of Management, Royal Children's Hospital, Melbourne.
- Alexander John Nicholson, formerly Chief of the Division of Entomology, Commonwealth Scientific and Industrial Research Organisation.
- Richard Godfrey Christian Parry-Okeden, of Darling Point, New South Wales. For services to Australian industry and in the affairs of employers' organisations.
- Florence Mary Taylor, OBE, of Potts Point, New South Wales, Architect and Civil Engineer
- John Keith Waller, OBE, Her Majesty's Australian Ambassador Extraordinary and Plenipotentiary to the Union of the Soviet Socialist Republics.
- Dudley Cadell Leslie Williams, Secretary, Department of Shipping and Transport.

==== Officer of the Order of the British Empire (OBE) ====
Military Division

- Acting Commander Noel Lindsay Sanderson, Royal Australian Navy.
- Colonel Norman Alan Mark Nicholls (2/36), Australian Staff Corps.
- Lieutenant-Colonel George Henry Rowden (3/37510), Australian Staff Corps.
- Lieutenant-Colonel Lionel Alexander Simpson (6/26003), Royal Australian Army Service Corps.
- Group Captain Carl Nisbet Blake, Royal Australian Air Force.
- Wing Commander Ian Russell Olorenshaw, DFC, (04410), Royal Australian Air Force.

Civil Division

- Robert William Charles Anderson, Director, Associated Chamber of Manufactures of Australia.
- Leslie Atkinson, of Earlwood, New South Wales. For services to Australian commerce and industry.
- Thomas William Bearup, Representative in the United Kingdom of the Australian Broadcasting Commission.
- Barbara Jocelyn Cullen, of Castle Hill, New South Wales. For social welfare services.
- Michael Doherty, Registrar of the High Court of Australia.
- Stephen Sydney Donelan, Federal President, Australian Primary Producers Union.
- Allan James Eastman, Assistant Secretary, Department of External Affairs.
- Keith William Edwards, formerly Vice Chairman of the Australian Coastal Shipping Commission.
- Margaret Frances Guy, Matron of Canberra Community Hospital.
- Herbert Denys Hake, Headmaster, The King's School, Parramatta, New South Wales.
- Frank Shaw Hanton, of Stonor, Tasmania. For services on behalf of incapacitated ex-servicemen.
- Geoffrey Richard May, chairman, Finance Committee of the Export Development Council.
- Norman Eric Murray, Director, Commonwealth Acoustic Laboratories.
- Eric Gilbert Roberts, chairman, Australian Dairy Produce Board.
- Thomas Mitchell Scott, President, Australian Woolgrowers' and Graziers' Council.
- Albert Leopold Senger, First Assistant Secretary (Marketing and Stabilization), Department of Primary Industry.
- Alice Constance Tisdall, of East Malvern, Victoria. For services to Education.
- Timothy Claudius Adolphus Weinert, JP, State Treasurer of the New South Wales Branch of the Commonwealth Council of Totally and Permanently Disabled Soldiers' Associations of Australia.

==== Member of the Order of the British Empire (MBE) ====
Military Division

Royal Australian Navy

- Lieutenant Alfred Charles Davie (S.D.) (B), Royal Australian Naval Volunteer Reserve.
- Sub-Lieutenant William James Roberts.

Australian Military Forces

- 5/1722 Warrant Officer Class II Leslie Stuart D'Vorak, Royal Australian Infantry Corps.
- Major Thomas Gibson (2/40076), Australian Staff Corps.
- Captain (temporary) Arthur John Vincent Gilberthorpe (2/165499), Royal Australian Army Ordnance Corps.
- Major William Norman Gravener (3/40084), Australian Staff Corps.
- 2/1451 Warrant Officer Class I George Thomas Cummings O'Keefe, Royal Australian Army Service Corps.
- Captain (temporary) John Leigh O'Rourke (3/165630), Royal Australian Infantry Corps.
- Major Phillip Peter Smith (1/21927), Royal Australian Army Medical Corps.

Royal Australian Air Force

- Squadron Leader Eric Alfred Addison (03211).
- Flight Lieutenant Walter Tauss (052837), Citizen Air Force.
- Warrant Officer Maxwell Hewson Beves (A.239).
- Warrant Officer Roy Thomas Ernest Langlands (A.31343).

Civil Division

- Joseph Bales, of Willoughby, New South Wales. For public services.
- Florence Myrtle Christian, National General Secretary, Young Women's Christian Association of Australia.
- Hughie Leslie Condon, Alderman of Wagga Wagga City Council, New South Wales.
- Eric Vere Corry, MB, BS, a medical practitioner, of Binnaway, New South Wales.
- Fraser Wesley Coss, member of the Australian Air Force Canteens Service Board.
- Francis Davison, Secretary, Queensland Division, Australian Postal Institute.
- Francis Roy Druery, JP, of Wallsend, New South Wales. For public services.
- Ray Arnot Ellis, of Armidale, New South Wales. For public and charitable services.
- Stanley William Gorrell, of Bourke, New South Wales. For public services.
- Ernest Harold Graham, JP, of Tamworth, New South Wales. For public services.
- George Gratton, formerly Assistant Deputy Commissioner of Taxation, New South Wales.
- Mabel Matilda Green, of Forbes, New South Wales. For services to the Australian Red Cross.
- Gwendoline Dorothea Julie Hansen, of Artarmon, New South Wales, formerly member of the Film Censorship Board.
- Heather May Harrison, of Ryde, New South Wales. For public and charitable services.
- Ernest Alfred Francis Head, Public Service Inspector, Perth, Western Australia.
- Alexander Victor Lyon, of Mildura, Victoria. For services to Australian agriculture.
- Gracemary MacKinnon, of Bentleigh, Victoria. For services to the Australian wool industry.
- Arthur William McIlveen, Brigadier, Salvation Army, Bexley, New South Wales.
- Eileen Passmore, a nursing sister of Bush Nursing Centre, Jindalbyne, New South Wales.
- George Norman Pockett, of Brighton, Victoria. For services to the Australian Motor Vehicle Standards Committee.
- Jack Roy, Engineering Manager, Ansett—Australian National Airways.
- James Rodger Taylor, President of the Police and Citizens' Association, Quirindi, New South Wales.
- Ada Muriel Thomas, Matron of the Garden Settlement for aged people, Chermside, Queensland.
- Captain Alexander Laurence Anderson Whitham, Chief Pilot, MacRobertson Miller Airlines.
- Florence Marion Williams, Secretary, Queensland Branch of the Over-Seas League.
- Charles Sydney York, of Gladesville, New South Wales. For services to charitable and social welfare organisations.
- Captain Thomas Robert Young, Secretary of the Aircraft Owners' and Pilots' Association of Australia.

=== British Empire Medal (BEM) ===
Military Division

Royal Australian Navy

- Leading Seaman Frederick Kevin Asher, O.N. RS1110.
- Able Seaman Harold Leslie Bingham, O.N. R50749.
- Engine Room Artificer Fourth Class Albert Ian Pollard, O.N. R54418.
- Royal Naval Shipwright Second Class Allan George Priest, O.N. R3S212.
- Mechanician First Class Reginald Joseph Warren, O.N. R39419.

Australian Military Forces

- 2/6320 Sergeant (temporary) John Edward Thomas Coyle, Royal Australian Engineers.
- 4/562 Sergeant George Thomas Dalby, Royal Australian Army Medical Corps.
- 2/1067 Staff Sergeant Garnet William Henry Davis, Royal Australian Infantry Corps.
- 3/10649 Sergeant Herbert John Anthony Haley, Royal Australian Infantry Corps.
- 3/524 Corporal (temporary) Lionel Patrick McMillen, Royal Australian Army Service Corps.
- 1/9605 Staff-Sergeant Maurice Reading, Royal Australian Army Ordnance Corps.
- 3/3672 Sergeant (temporary) Patrick Howard Wood, Royal Australian Survey Corps.

Royal Australian Air Force

- A2303 Flight Sergeant Richard Tarlinton Collins.
- A2595 Flight Sergeant Charles Eric Hogan.
- A5585 Sergeant Ermo Peter John Gugiatti.
- A32301 Sergeant Allan Gordon Wheeler.

Civil Division

- Robert Fox, Works Supervisor, Commonwealth Department 61 Works, Territory of Papua and New Guinea.
- Arthur Gibbs, Superintendent of Water Supply and Sewerage, Department of Works, Canberra.
- William Henry Littlefield, lately Principal Cook, Parliamentary Refreshment Rooms, Canberra.
- Blanche Carmel Jane O'Connell, Typist, Controller-General of Munitions Supply.
- Herbert Peeler, Employment Officer, Public Service Inspector's Office, Melbourne.
- Olwen Abigail Wooster, Ground Communications Superintendent, Trans-Australia Airlines.

=== Air Force Cross (AFC) ===
Royal Australian Air Force

- Wing Commander Neville Patrick McNamara (011353).
- Wing Commander Ian Stanley Parker, DFC, (011391).
- Squadron Leader Keith Isaacs (05861) Royal Australian Air Force.

==== Bar to Air Force Cross ====
- Wing Commander James Patrick Graney, AFC, (04409).

=== Queen's Commendation for Valuable Service in the Air ===
Royal Australian Air Force

- Flight Lieutenant Douglas Malcolm Johnston (025944).
- Flight Lieutenant Frank Ronald Lome (035101).
- Flight Lieutenant Alan Raymond Reed (052363).
- Flight Lieutenant George Percy Watkin (022186).

== Nigeria ==
=== Knight Bachelor ===
Federation of Nigeria

- Lionel Brett, a Judge of the Federal Supreme Court.

Western Region

- Samuel Okai Quashie-Idun, Chief Justice of the Region.

=== Order of Saint Michael and Saint George ===
==== Knight Commander of the Order of St Michael and St George (KCMG) ====
Federation of Nigeria

- Peter Hyla Gawne Stallard, CMG, CVO, MBE, Secretary to the Prime Minister.

==== Companion of the Order of St Michael and St George (CMG) ====
Northern Region

- Alhaji Aliyu, CBE, Makama of Bida, Minister of Finance.

Eastern Region

- Chief Nyong Essien, President of the House of Chiefs.

=== Order of the British Empire ===
==== Commander of the Order of the British Empire (CBE) ====
Civil Division
Northern Region

- Alhaji Isa Kaita, OBE, Madawaki of Katsina, Minister of Education.
- Mallam Ali Ocheje Obaje, the Atta of Igala, and a member of the House of Chiefs.

Eastern Region

- Peter Forbes Grant, MBE, Permanent Secretary, Ministry of Education.

==== Officer of the Order of the British Empire (OBE) ====
Civil Division
Northern Region

- Alhaji Muhammadu Bashar, Minister for Local Government.
- Derek Vincent Mountain, Administrative Officer, Class II.
- Mallam Muhamman, the Emir of Gumel, and a member of the House of Chiefs.
- Mallam Umaru Nassarawa, Waziri of Gwandu.

Eastern Region

- Richard Whitfield Harding, Administrative Officer, Class II.
- Reuben Ibekwe Uzoma, Education Secretary, Anglican Niger Delta Diocese.

Western Region

- Professor Oladele Adebayo Ajose, MD, of the University College, Ibadan, Public Service Commissioner.
- The Right Reverend Solomon Odunaiya Odutola, Anglican Bishop of Ibadan.

==== Member of the Order of the British Empire (MBE) ====
Military Division

- Major Cyril Morgan (416305), The South Wales Borderers; on loan to the Government of the Federation of Nigeria.

Civil Division
Federation of Nigeria

- Gabrielle Mary Bond, Personal Secretary, Grade II.
- John Thomas Cresswell Denley, Superintendent of Police.
- Akartbi Olagunju Oke, Health Superintendent (Port).

Northern Region

- Alhaji Abubakar, Waziri of Kano.
- Alhaji Ahmadu Dan Baba, Marafa of Sokoto, Councillor for Local Government, Sokoto Native Authority.
- Mallam Bako Kaduna, Magistrate and Court President.
- Mallam Iro Gawo, Information Officer, Ratsina Native Administration.
- William Law Hogan, Education Officer.
- Mallama Binta Yusufu Idiaro, Teacher, Grade II, Ilorin Native Authority.
- Michael Colin Aldis Large, Administrative Officer, Class III.
- Alhaji Usman Liman, Distract Head of Musawa, Katsina Native Authority.
- George Henry Shackleton, Assistant Works Manager.
- Alhaji Ahmed Tijjani Malumfashi, Senior Technical Officer.

Eastern Region

- Jeremiah Amadi Enyeazu, Secretary, Eastern Nigeria Sports Commission.
- John Stanley Blankson Ikpe, Education Officer.
- Lilian Murphy, Supervising Teacher of Leprosy Schools in Ogoja Province.
- Margaret Lilian Ogle. For services to education in Eastern Nigeria.
- Kalu Chima Okorie, Regional Librarian and Secretary to the Eastern Nigeria Library Board.
- Janet Matagu Okoye, a member of the Enugu Urban County Council.

Western Region

- Chief Gabriel Mamukuyomi Akinsete, The Sala of Ondo.
- Alhaja Hunmuani Alaga. For social welfare services to Muslim women.
- Walter Harold Cooke, Superintending Engineer.
- Rowland Hughes, Education Secretary to the Methodist Mission.
- Aubrey Thomas Kemp, Accountant-General.
- The Reverend Samuel Nwedi Martins. For social welfare services, especially among his people of Issele-Uku.
- Daniel Oyebanjo Odukale, Regional Tax Administrator.

=== Companion of the Imperial Service Order (ISO) ===
Nigerian Civil Service
Eastern Region

- Peter Egbo Eyo Archibong, Administrative Officer, Class II.

Western Region

- Titus Oluseye Ejiwunmi, Permanent Secretary, Ministry of Health and Social Welfare.

=== British Empire Medal (BEM) ===
Military Division

- Warrant Officer Class II Elijah Anosike, Royal Nigerian Army.
- NA/71676 Company Sergeant-Major Garba Guru, Royal Nigerian Army.
- Band Sergeant-Major Thomas Njimogu, Royal Nigerian Army.

Civil Division

- Victor Adegboyega Olubi Bereke Da Costa, Chief Clerk, Ministry of Works and Surveys, Federation of Nigeria.
- Alhaji Goni Maiduguri Sergeant Major, Bornu Native Authority Police, Northern Region of Nigeria.
- Samson, Bagana, Corporal, Igala Native Authority Police, Northern Region of Nigeria.

=== Queen's Police Medal (QPM) ===
Federation of Nigeria

- John James O'Sullivan, MBE, Deputy Commissioner of Police.
- Frank Bernard Williams, Assistant Commissioner of Police.

== Sierra Leone ==
=== Knight Bachelor ===
- Salako Ambrosius Benka-Coker, OBE, Chief Justice.

=== Order of the British Empire ===
==== Commander of the Order of the British Empire (CBE) ====
Civil Division

- Muhammad Sanusi Mustapha, Deputy Prime Minister and Minister of Finance.

==== Officer of the Order of the British Empire (OBE) ====
Civil Division

- Eric Downing, Dean of the Faculty of Science, Fourah Bay College.
- Denis Scott Garvie. Lately Irrigation and Drainage Engineer, Department of Agriculture.
- Paramount Chief Raymond Brima Sese Koker, MBE, Bagbo Chiefdom, South Western Province.
- Alhaji Alimami Suri, Paramount Chief, Kunike Barina Chiefdom, Makali, Northern Province.

==== Member of the Order of the British Empire (MBE) ====
Civil Division

- Effie Mary Colbeck, Principal, Annie Walsh Memorial School, Freetown.
- Thomas Frederick Hope, Water Engineer, Freetown City Council.
- Lawrence Mervyn Lloyd, District Commissioner.
- Paramount Chief Alpha Ngobeh, Luawa Chiefdom, Kailahun.
- Alexander Grant Smith, Chief Superintendent, Electricity Department.
- Henry Vidalson Ladejobie Williams, Superintendent of Police.

=== British Empire Medal (BEM) ===
Military Division

- SLA/37372 Regimental Sergeant-Major Gbonkonko Boima, 1st Battalion, Sierra Leone Regiment.
- SLA/47142 Company Sergeant-Major Sahr Kissi, 1st Battalion, Sierra Leone Regiment.

Civil Division

- John Lashtine Davies Anyaa, Assistant Production Officer, Forest Department.

=== Queen's Police Medal (QPM) ===
- Leslie William Leigh, Assistant Commissioner, Sierra Leone Police Force.

== Federation of Rhodesia and Nyasaland ==
=== Knight Bachelor ===
- The Honourable Francis Arthur Briggs, Judge of the Federal Supreme Court.

=== Order of Saint Michael and Saint George ===
==== Companion of the Order of St Michael and St George (CMG) ====
- Alan Biddulph Cowen, OBE, Deputy Chairman of the Standards Association of Rhodesia and Nyasaland. For public services.

=== Order of the British Empire ===
==== Officer of the Order of the British Empire (OBE) ====
Military Division

- Colonel Christopher Bernard McCullagh, MBE, Rhodesia and Nyasaland Army.
- Wing Commander John Howard Deall, DSO, DFC, Royal Rhodesian Air Force.

Civil Division

- Francis Harry George Bridgman, a member of the staff of the Federal Prime Minister's Office.
- Thomas Charles Pascoe. For services to the Dairy industry.
- Zoe Sophie Shearer, MBE. For services to commerce and industry, and also in connection with the Women's Voluntary Services.

==== Member of the Order of the British Empire (MBE) ====
Military Division

- Warrant Officer Class I Gideon Henry Erasmus, Rhodesia and Nyasaland Army.
- Warrant Officer Class II Thurston Henry Leslie Ford, Rhodesia and Nyasaland Army.
- Warrant Officer Cyril Thomas Jones, Royal Rhodesian Air Force.

Civil Division

- Margaret Patricia Greig, a member of the office staff at Government House.
- Masombsh Mike Hove. For political services.
- Margaret Grieve Low, Headmistress, Townsend School, Bulawayo.
- Cecil Edward Mark Moore. For public services.
- Rachel Horn Semple, a member of the staff of the Federal Prime Minister's Office.
