= Kenneth Cohen =

British sailor and intelligence officer (1900–1984)

Commander Kenneth Cohen CB CMG RN
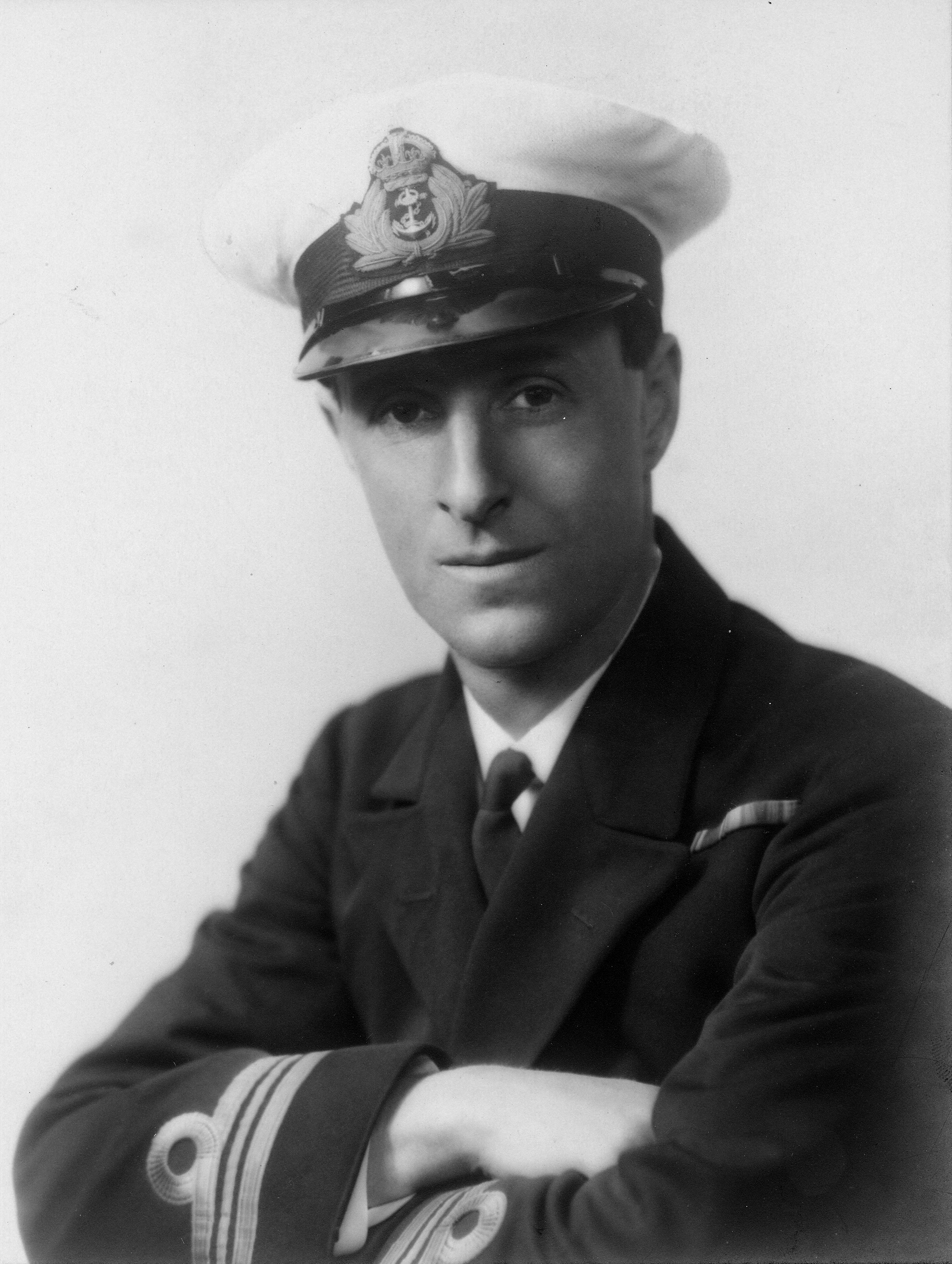
- Cohen in 1932

Vice President of the European League for Economic Cooperation
- In office 1972–1984

Director of Production for the Secret Intelligence Service
- In office ?–1953

Director of Personnel for the Secret Intelligence Service
- In office 1946–?

Personal details
- Born: 15 March 1900 Branch Hill, Hampstead, London, United Kingdom
- Died: 19 September 1984 (aged 84) Westminster, United Kingdom
- Spouse: Mary Sarah Joseph (m. 1932)
- Children: 2
- Parents: Herman Cohen; Bessie Salaman
- Education: Elstree School; Harrow School
- Alma mater: Keyham College; Eastbourne College; Caius College, Cambridge; RN Staff College
- Awards

Military service
- Branch/service: Secret Intelligence Service; Royal Navy
- Rank: Commander
- Unit: Grand Fleet; Z Organisation
- Battles/wars: World War I; Operation ZZ; Scuttling of the German fleet at Scapa Flow; Phoney War; World War II; Operation SUSSEX; Cold War
- Vessels: HMS Iron Duke; HMS President; HMS Sheffield
- Code names: Z-3, Wagon, Kenneth Crane, Captain Crank

Kenneth Herman Salaman Cohen was a British sailor and intelligence officer who served in both world wars. He was an officer of the Royal Navy who served as a cadet during World War I to see the Scuttling of the German fleet at Scapa Flow. He would often say that he was "the first Jew in the Royal Navy." After specializing as a torpedo officer during Interwar Period, he "retired" at the rank of Lieutenant commander in 1935. His retirement was a smokescreen to join the Secret Intelligence Service (SIS or MI6). Before Britain had formally entered World War II, Cohen worked for Thomas Kendrick and Claude Dansey as Z-3, placed in charge of the London Branch of the Z Organisation as deputy director. In 1943, he became the lead SIS spymaster and case officer for the entire region of Western Europe. He was also the Chair of the Tripartite Planning Committee for Operation SUSSEX. After the war, he became SIS Director of Personnel, Controller for Eastern Europe, and the Director of Production. He retired from SIS in 1953, at the height of the Cold War and in the midst of the exposure of Kim Philby.

Away from the Secret Service, he became the European advisor to the United Steel Companies, serving here to oversee the company's transition into the European Common Market. In 1972, he became Vice President of the European League for Economic Cooperation, advocating heavily for Britain to join the European Union. He was also a member of the Garrick Club, a councillor for Chatham House, and was chair of the Franco-British Society.

== Early life and career ==
Kenneth Cohen was born 15 March 1900 at 1 Lower Terrace, Branch Hill, Hampstead, London. Cohen's grandfather was James Hermann, a briefly-served Rabbi in Brighton who ran a boarding school for Jewish boys, and later became the President of the Middle Street Synagogue. Cohen's father was Herman Joseph Cohen, the first Jew to win the Hebrew Scholarship to the University of Oxford. Herman became a well-respected lawyer and barrister. Cohen's mother was Bessie Salaman.

=== Early naval career ===
Kenneth Cohen was trained for four-and-a-half months as a "special entry" naval cadet in the waning days of World War I at Keyham College, where he was taught rigging, boat-sailing, and seamanship. At the time of his studies here, the captain of Keyham College was Herbert John Temple Marshall, who had been a captain since 1889 with the captaincy of nine naval vessels to that point, and demanded perfection from his students.

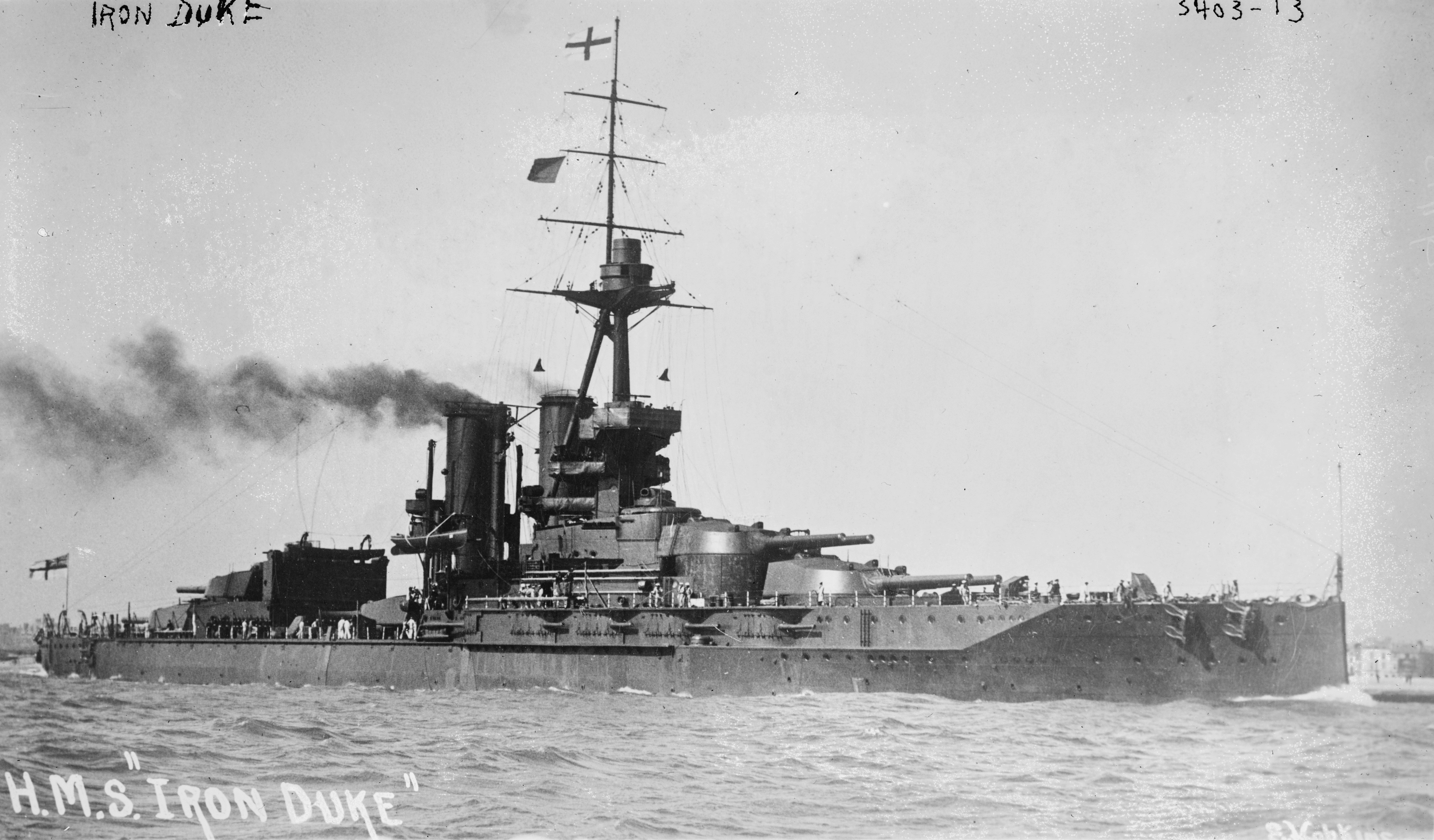
Iron Duke underway

Cohen missed out the bulk of the First World War while he was attending Keyham, but he wrote about its aftermath upon joining the crew of the HMS Iron Duke to meet the surrendering German High Seas Fleet at the Firth of Forth and Operation ZZ:

"Boarding parties were duly sent out to examine the victims—no-one could believe there would be no sign of resistance but there was none. It had been a magnificent spectacle and never since the days of the Persians can there have been such an endless spread of warships."

After Operation ZZ, which was by that point the largest gathering of naval vessels in history, the Iron Duke accompanied the High Seas Fleet to Scapa Flow, where Cohen witnessed the Scuttling of the German fleet at Scapa Flow.

=== Interwar Period ===
In 1926, Cohen joined the Torpedo Division. In 1932, Cohen graduated from RN Staff College and served as an interpreter in French and Russian. In 1935, he officially "retired" from the Royal Navy at the rank of Lieutenant commander.

== Z Organisation ==
At this time, in 1935, Kenneth Cohen was recruited into the Secret Intelligence Service – an organization which officially had never been publicly avowed, requiring him to have "retired" before joining so that he could be given an undercover posting. He was placed under the cover of a Passport Control Officer (PCO) working for the British Foreign Office, a position created specifically for SIS officers deployed in foreign countries. He was soon appointed head of the Passport Control Office section for diplomatic delegations abroad.

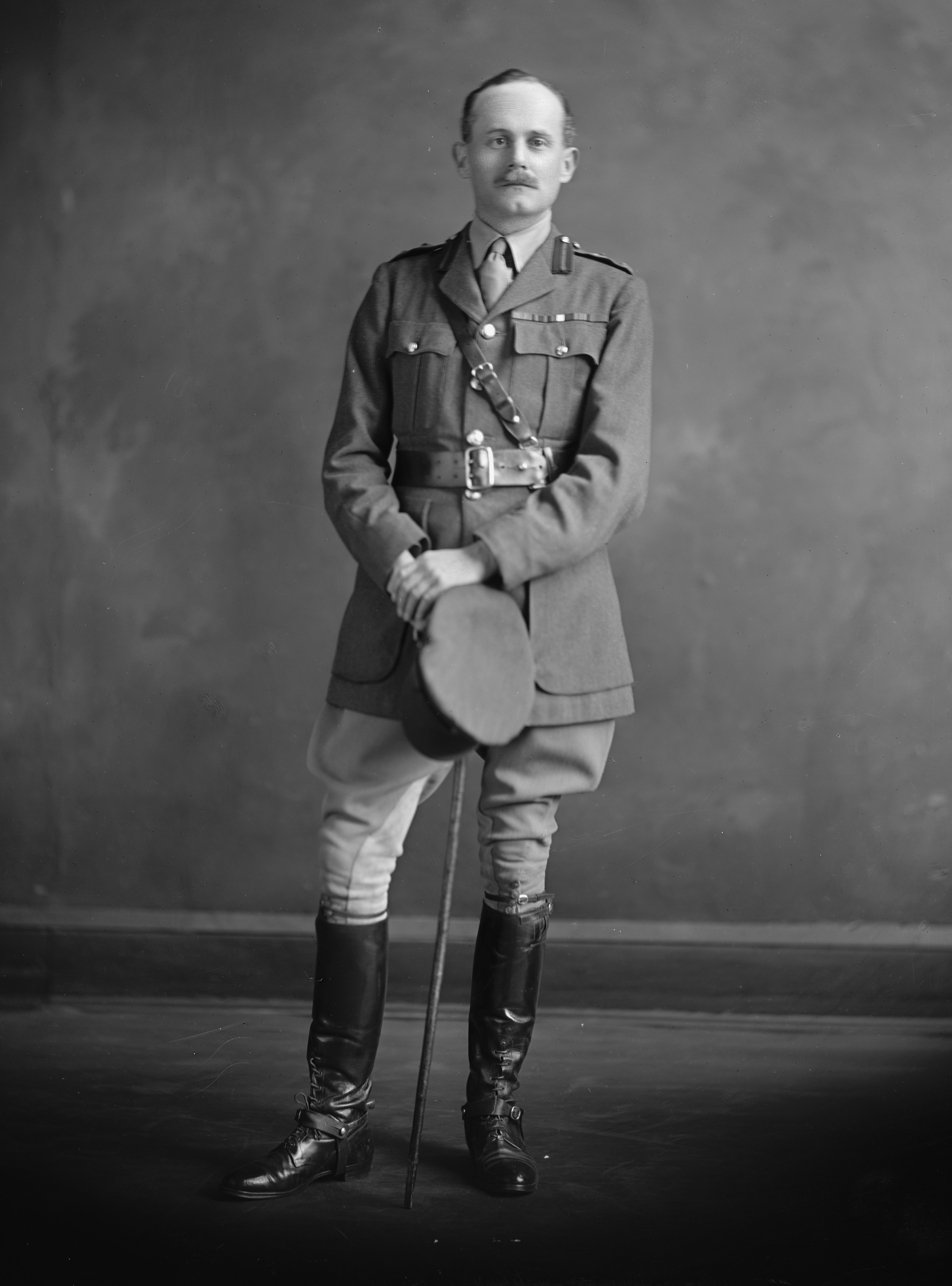
Claude Dansey, known Colonel Z, was the director of the Z Organisation.

A little into a year of his time at SIS, in 1936, Cohen was one of the very first officers recruited into the newly created Z Organisation, also sometimes referred to as the Z Network. The Z Organisation was an intelligence network intentionally kept apart from SIS, but one that operated in parallel to those networks having been set-up by SIS PCO's in Europe. The Z Organisation was the brainchild of Claude Dansey, who recognized that if the Germans would ever compromise the Passport Control Office, British intelligence would be irreparably damaged, and created the Z Organisation as a backstop.

Cohen was placed in charge of the London headquarters branch of the Z Organisation, based out of a rented office suite at Bush House, Aldwych, and another building on Maple Street, Fitzrovia. Cohen was codenamed Kenneth Crane, acting as an executive officer for the commercial front Menoline Limited. In this capacity, every Z agent in London reported directly to Cohen at this office. "Z agents," as they were called, had been recruited by Dansey – known as Colonel Z – largely from the journalism industry, or were members of the British expat business community abroad, both careers having legitimate reasons for constant travel. They were assigned numbers as their code names for telegraphy purposes. Cohen, while technically an officer and not an agent, was assigned the number Z-3.

In 1937, Cohen was appointed assistant to Thomas Kendrick, head of the Passport Control Office in Paris. However, in 1938, Kendrick was arrested while crossing Austrian border, after being betrayed by a double agent. While he was only held in prison for twenty days, Kendrick's network collapsed. During the Phoney War, in 1939, Cohen continued working with Kendrick and took a new cover identity as Captain Crank, redeveloping clandestine intelligence operations with Kendrick around the continent.

At around the same time that Cohen and Kendrick were operating on the continent in 1938, another officer named Dick Ellis was managing the 22000 Organisation, which was an intelligence network operating as an arm of SIS in Germany.

== World War II ==
Shortly after the outbreak of World War II, Claude Dansey was forced to merge the Z Organisation into SIS, against his own wishes. Dansey's fears were realized when, shortly after the merger, the entire SIS network in Europe was compromised by a double agent. Sigismund Best, Cohen's counterpart in Holland, was abducted at Venlo in November 1939. Cohen's duties, with the Z Organisation shut down, were then shifted to the A4 Section of SIS, also known as the French Country Section.

In May, 1940, with Cohen's forced evacuation back to England, Stewart Menzies placed Cohen in charge of the SIS Section A5, while placing Wilfred Dunderdale in charge of Section A4. Cohen was still reporting to Dansey, who was now assistant director of SIS, while Dunderdale was reporting directly to Menzies. Cohen was deployed again to France under the re-organized French Section.

Later in 1940, he was made the SIS A4 chief of Vichy France, designated the P1 Production Section. Cohen's task here became to recruit sources from Unoccupied France, and especially to coordinate with French Resistance movements that might be made amenable networks for SIS intelligence.

Under Cohen's command as P1;

- P1a, North Africa
- P1b, Non-Free French
- P1c, Free French

In the Spring of 1941, as the head of A5, Cohen was made the SIS liaison to André Dewavrin, known as "Colonel Passy," who was the head of the intelligence agency for Free France, known at the time as the Bureau central de renseignements et d'action militaire (BCRAM), formerly known as the Service de Renseignements (SR). Dewarvin and Cohen equipped and trained dozens of Resistance agents for infiltration into France.

One of those officers that Cohen deployed at this time to France, through Spain, was Gilbert Renault, known as "Colonel Rémy," who began establishing a network of agents along the French Atlantic coast.

Cohen did not care if he had the cooperation of the Free French, and developed networks throughout France no matter their affiliation, as long as they could become allied to SIS. He fostered relationships with Albert Triboulet and Raymond Triboulet – one of whom developed a smaller network known as the Triboulet Network. He also developed the Sosies with Pierre Ponchardier and Dominique Ponchardier. Another smaller group he developed was called the Jove Network.

=== ALLIANCE Network ===
ALLIANCE was a massive intelligence network within the French Resistance.

Another important recruit for Cohen was a man named Georges Loustaunau-Lacau, who took the codename "Navarre." Loustaunau-Lacau was a hero of the First World War who had worked directly underneath Philippe Pétain against the Germans at the Marne and the Somme. He was the head of a veterans' association of former French soldiers known as Les Anciens Combattants, but he was also exceptionally right-wing and anti-communist, which complicated Cohen's relationships with the NKVD on the Eastern Front. Loustaunau-Lacau called his own network at the time "Kul."

One of Cohen's recruits was Jacques Bridou, who was parachuted into France in March 1941 to take over the management of ALLIANCE. However, Lacau was arrested by his former Lieutenant Maxime Weygand in North Africa after attempting to incite an insurrection there, leaving Bridou to coordinate a new apparatus. Bridou then ensured that it was his own sister, Marie-Madeleine Fourcade, who would take over the management of ALLIANCE.

Fourcade met Cohen for the first time in person in Lisbon, where Cohen then learned that she was a woman, and a mother of two.

=== Liaison to Washington ===
In the summer of 1941, Cohen was sent to Washington, D.C., where he worked as a liaison officer to the newly created Office of the Coordinator of Information (COI). He helped here to establish an intelligence network on the Iberian Peninsula.

As a result of his experiences in both Washington and France, he became an intermediary between the Office of Strategic Services (OSS) and the Bureau central de renseignements et d'action (BCRA).

=== Director of Production ===
In the latter part of the war, Cohen was made the Director of Production for SIS. Under his command were;

- Patrick Whinney, Western Hemisphere
- Harry Carr, Northern Region
- John Teague, Eastern Mediterranean
- William H. Bremner, Eastern Mediterranean
- Rex Millar, Americas
- Dick Ellis, "Special"

=== Director of training ===
In March, 1943, Cohen was appointed chief staff officer for training. The official SIS historian Keith Jeffery writes that this was a turning point in the professionalism of the intelligence field in Britain. The war had forced the creation of more coherent and coordinated training at SIS. Prior to Cohen's appointment, training at SIS – with the exception of GC&CS – was haphazard and decentralized, with most sections either having their own entirely separate training programs and schoolhouses. On many occasions, training programs were created person-to-person, as Rex Howard did by creating a bespoke curriculum for his recruit trainee Graham Greene.

Cohen established the first SIS officers' training course in the Summer of 1943 with only three students, and saw its steady expansion into a professional schoolhouse. In September, ten more students were admitted, but now the instructional staff was creating curricula to be distributed to overseas stations throughout the British Empire, and in occupied Europe.

Additionally, before Cohen was made training director, trainers and instructors had no centralized ability to recommend or coordinate the placement of officers into different sections. Now, individual officers could be trained centrally and placed anywhere in the agency. The reverse was also inaugurated: agents recruited in the field could now be placed in any particular training program at the agency at the suggestion of any field section. Officers already established could also be sent for new equipment training or training in new philosophies of intelligence collection.

=== Controller Western Europe ===
At some point in 1943, Stewart Menzies completely changed the structure of SIS, separating out the functions of armed service representation from geographical responsibilities, and creating new "controllerates," to oversee geographic areas. Cohen was made the controller for Western Europe (CWE).

==== Operation SUSSEX ====
In the summer of 1943, Cohen was assigned command over BRISSEX, which was the British component of Operation SUSSEX. This was a tripartite joint operation between the British SIS, the American Secret Intelligence Branch (SI) at OSS/London, and BCRAL, which was the London branch of the French BCRA. This operation involved dropping by parachute teams of French spies recruited from the ranks of the Free French Army – all of them French. These were two-person teams, one being a radio operator, and the other being an observer. While BRISSEX agents were those who would collect intelligence in the objective areas of the 21st Army Group, OSSEX teams would be deployed to the American objective areas. In December, Cohen complained to Tony Morris in Algiers that the French were too focused on political infighting to produce quality candidates.

Due to his senior position, and having already been involved in operations with many of the people involved in planning this operation, Cohen was made Chair of the SUSSEX Tripartite Planning Committee when it was created in January 1944. The other members of the committee were two of his former trainees; Gilbert Renault was the French commander of the operation, and Francis Pickens Miller was the commander of OSSEX.

== Postwar career, later life, and death ==
After the war, Cohen was appointed to several high-ranking positions within SIS. He was made the Director of Personnel, Controller for Eastern Europe, and again as the Director of Production.

Only two years before his retirement, Kim Philby was exposed as a double agent, launching a fury of investigation by Section V and MI5, that would become the Cambridge Five Affair.

In 1953, Cohen retired from the service.

He went into private enterprise, becoming the European adviser to the United Steel Companies.

Kenneth Cohen died in 1984.

== Controversies ==
=== Habsburg case officer ===
According to the controversial book MI6: Fifty Years of Special Operations by the journalist Stephen Dorril, before World War II broke out, Cohen was given responsibilities to manage "higher political tasks" for SIS, to include acting as the agency's case officer for the anti-fascist members of the House of Habsburg, especially being Otto von Habsburg and Alice Habsburg. According to Dorril, Cohen met Otto in Paris in October 1939 in order to gain access to Habsburg funds for the war effort.

=== Soviet agent Diamond cleared for duty ===
According to Nigel West, while serving as the Director of Personnel for SIS in 1947, Cohen ignored a standard residency and nationality requirement in the vetting of George Blake. Despite the fact that SIS required its officers to have British nationality, he allowed Blake to become a fully operational officer of the spy agency. Blake was decades later held under suspicion by SIS Section V and MI5 as being potential mole or double agent for the Soviet Union who operated under the code name "Diamond."

According to David Stafford, however, it was Andrew King who had first noticed Blake in 1946, and convinced Cohen to clear Blake for active duty. King, himself, was also later held under suspicion by Section V, because he had been to Cambridge at the same time as Kim Philby, and had himself also been a member of the Communist Party, and was himself a foreigner. According to Stafford, when Andrew King was worried about his own application status at SIS, Cohen told King: "C says that since spies are only people of foreign origin, don't bother." Nigel West disputes the assertion that Andrew King was a mole or double agent, stating that King was only dismissed from the service in 1966 because he was a homosexual.
