= Andrew King (spy) =

British intelligence officer (1915–2002)

Andrew King MBE CMG

Chief of Hong Kong Station for the Secret Intelligence Service
- In office 1953–1966

Chief of Vienna Station for the Secret Intelligence Service
- In office 1950–1953

Controller for the Eastern Area
- In office ?

Personal details
- Born: 25 July 1915
- Died: 18 October 2002 (aged 87)
- Parents: Evelyn N Sharpe; Andrew Buchanan King
- Education: Wellington College, Berkshire
- Alma mater: Magdalene College, Cambridge
- Espionage activity
- Service branch: Secret Intelligence Service
- Active: World War II; Cold War
- Codename: Z-2

Charles Andrew Buchanan King was an intelligence officer of the Z Organisation and the British Secret Intelligence Service (SIS or MI6) who served during World War II and the Cold War. In 1938, he was recruited by Claude Dansey into the Z Organisation, where he was designated Z-2, answering to Thomas Kendrick and Kenneth Cohen. During the war, King was stationed in Switzerland for SIS. Here, he handled an agent named Halina Szymanska, who had access to Admiral Wilhelm Canaris. After the war, he became the SIS Controller for the Eastern Area (CEA), placed in charge of Germany, Switzerland, and Austria. Later, he was made the Chief of Station in Vienna, and then Hong Kong. King was "retired" from SIS in 1966 after revelations that he was a homosexual surfaced in connection to questions surrounding his friendship with Kim Philby while they were both studying at the University of Cambridge. In 1986, King was prosecuted alongside many of his former colleagues for the breach of classified information in relation to the book Conspiracy of Silence: The Secret Life of Anthony Blunt by the authors Barrie Penrose and Simon Freeman.

== Biography ==
=== Early life ===
Andrew King, as he was mostly known, was born 25 July 1915. His father was Major Andrew Buchanan King, an officer in the 7th Argyll and Sutherland Highlanders who was killed from injuries sustained during fighting at the Second Battle of Ypres, when King was still a fetus. King's mother would eventually remarry and become Evelyn Nina Crombie.

He was educated at Wellington School.

=== Cambridge years ===
In the autumn of 1933, King arrived in the town of Cambridge to study at Magdalene College, Cambridge. The common British pedagogy term is to say that King "read economics" here, which effectively means that economics was his primary subject of study.

In the Spring and Summer of 1933, King travelled to Germany for holiday. While he was here, he witnessed the Nazi Party secure absolute power in the country. He personally witnessed violence and intimidation by the Stormtroopers in the streets of Germany, where they targeted Communists, Social Democrats, Jews, and liberal critics of the regime. Brown shirts smashed in storefront windows, Bolsheviks and Jews were detained en-masse.

The method of his return to England is unknown, but as soon as he did return to Cambridge for the beginning of the autumn term, he immediately joined the Communist Party of Great Britain. They claimed that they were determined to fight Hitler, and as his obituary in The Telegraph reads: "...he was easy prey for recruitment..." His recruiter into the party was Roualeyn Cumming-Bruce, who lived in the flat above his. King became a member of the Cambridge Socialist Society, and soon entered into an election to become the Society's treasurer. He also at this time became associated with Kim Philby and Guy Burgess.

He lost his Communist membership card less than a year later. He told the writers Barrie Penrose and Simon Freeman that: "I had to pay about 20 per cent of my income to the party which was jolly high. Most students at Cambridge had private allowances from their families and we all had to donate money to the party. I certainly wasn't a covert member."

After witnessing the Saar Plebiscite of 1935, he became increasingly frustrated with the Communist Party – they had promised that the voters of Saarland would have rejected a return to Germany, and he felt betrayed by the Communist leadership. He had never been a resolute Communist, but soon after, he left the party altogether in disgust.

=== Z Organisation ===
Fresh out of Cambridge, in 1936, King became one of the first officers recruited by Claude Dansey, known as Colonel Z, to become an officer for the Colonel's intelligence agency known as the Z Organisation, sometimes called the Z Network. This intelligence agency, which had been specifically created by Claude Dansey and Stewart Menzies to be kept entirely separate from the Passport Control Offices of the Secret Intelligence Service. Every officer in the Z Organisation was designated with a number, and King's number here was Z-2.

He was sent to Austria and Switzerland, operating under the cover of a film studio executive for London Films, a film studio run by Alexander Korda. His cover needed him to interview potential actors and actresses for upcoming films, go location scouting to find potential filming locations, and to purchase screenplays. In reality, his position enabled him to keep in contact with intelligence networks and spy rings who were monitoring the German rearmament.

=== World War II ===
At the outbreak of the war, the Z Organisation was merged into the main Secret Intelligence Service, to the dismay of Claude Dansey, whose fears were realized when a double agent betrayed the entire network.

Andrew King was placed undercover into the British Foreign Office, and appointed the assistant to Count Frederick Vanden Heuvel, the SIS Chief of Station in Zurich, who was working at the time as a consul in Geneva. In 1941, King was then transferred to Bern.

In Bern, he cultivate Halina Szymańska, a close friend of Admiral Wilhelm Canaris. Canaris had seen the rise of the Nazi Party with disgust, but had also managed to become chief of the Abwehr. Through Szymańska, King passed on information to the Russians that Hitler planned to attack them – information that they failed to heed, and did not believe when they received it. Andrew King was Szymańska's case officer through the entire war, and saw her resettlement in England at the end of the war. He even secured her three daughters a place at St. Mary's, Ascot.

=== Cold War ===
In 1950, King became the Chief of Station in Vienna. He supervised the management of Operation Silver, which had been launched the year before. Silver involved a series of tunnels dug under the city, tapping the communication cables at the Hotel Imperial, which was the headquarters of the Soviet Kommandatura in the city. Operation Silver was never discovered by the USSR.

In 1951, upon the exposure of Kim Philby, and the flight of Guy Burgess and Donald Maclean to Russia, King was recalled to London and submitted to questioning for three days.

In 1953, King got into a fight with another SIS officer named Anthony Cavendish. Details of the brawl are still classified, but as punishment, King was sent to the other side of the planet.

King was made Chief of Station in Hong Kong. Here, he gained an affinity for the Far East, where he had never been before.

=== Forced retirement ===
In 1966, a renewed molehunt investigation at MI5 and SIS Section V was searching for new persons who might have been involved with the Cambridge Five. He informed his investigators that Kenneth Cohen had known the whole time that King had been a Communist at Cambridge, and that Stewart Menzies had signed off on it. However, MI5 did not have a record of this. The fact that King had known of Philby's membership in the Communist Party put King under suspicion himself. He took an early retirement.

He joined the London Chamber of Commerce and Industry, where he became the Chief of the Western Hemisphere Division.

Many years later, after homosexuality was legalized in the United Kingdom, he admitted that he was actually forced to resign because he was gay, and that the interrogations had been rather cordial.

He died in 2002.
