= Jacques Bridou =

French bobsledder and Resistance fighter

Personal information
- Relative: Marie-Madeleine Fourcade (sister)
- Military career
- Branch: Secret Intelligence Service; French Resistance
- Commands: ALLIANCE
- Conflicts: World War II
- Awards: Resistance Medal

Sport
- Sport: Bobsleigh
Medal record
World Championships
Bronze medal – third place	1934 Garmisch-Partenkirchen	Four-man

Jacques Bridou (8 October 1911 - 1953) was a French bobsledder who competed in the 1930s. He won a bronze medal in the four-man event at the 1934 FIBT World Championships in Garmisch-Partenkirchen.

Bridou also competed at the 1936 Winter Olympics in Garmisch-Partenkirchen, finishing ninth in the four-man and 14th in the two-man events.

He was also one of the leading figures of the French Resistance during World War II, helping to establish and lead a network known as ALLIANCE that would later be led by his sister, Marie-Madeleine Fourcade. He had been recruited into the French Resistance by Kenneth Cohen, a high-ranking case officer at the British Secret Intelligence Service. Bridou was also the one who introduced Marie to Georges Loustaunau-Lacau.
