= Station Victor =

Secret OSS communications facility during World War 2

- Part of SI/London
- Hurley, Berkshire, United Kingdom
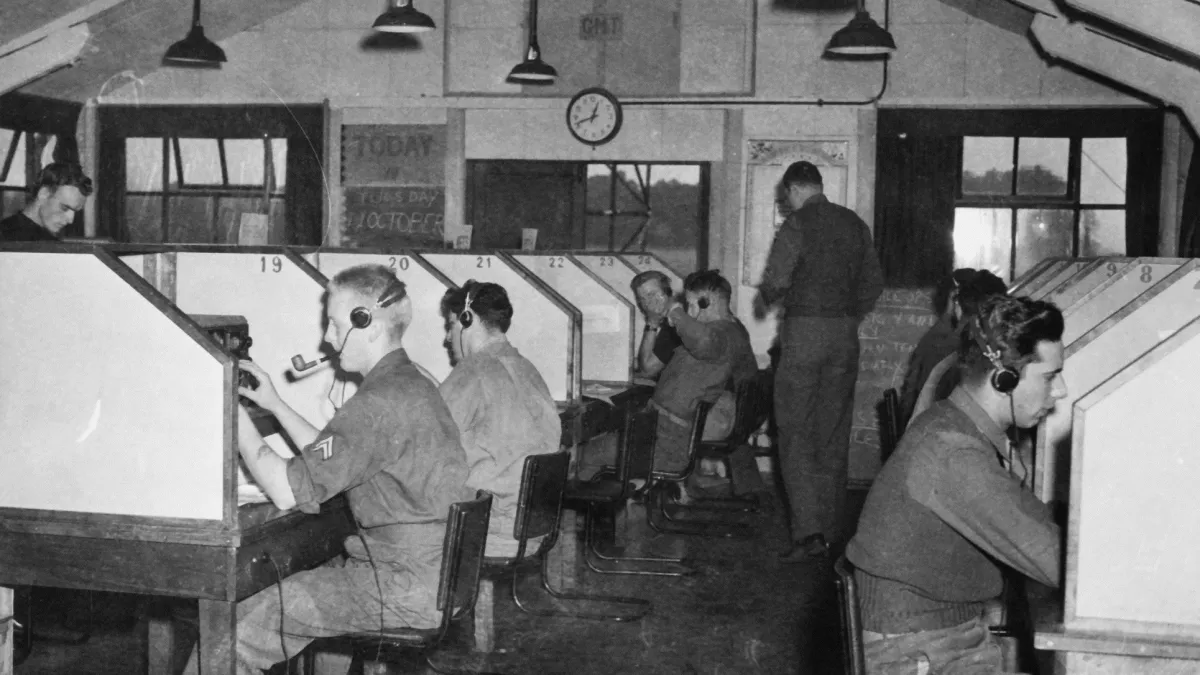

Site information
- Type: Communications
- Owner: Office of Strategic Services
- Operator: Secret Intelligence Branch
- Controlled by: United States
- Condition: Mostly demolished

Location
- Coordinates: 51.523042°N 0.811875°W

Site history
- In use: 1943-1945
- Demolished: 1945
- Battles/wars: World War II

Garrison information
- Past commanders: George Lewis Graveson
- Designations: Blue plaque

Station VICTOR, also known as the Hurley Communications Center, in Hurley, Berkshire, was the primary communications facility of the Office of Strategic Services (OSS) in the United Kingdom between 1943 and 1945, operated by members of its Secret Intelligence Branch (SI), overseen by the command and control of SI/London. Here, between 150 and 200 Americans were stationed at radio listening posts, communicating with officers and spies deployed to mainland Europe, and analyzing communications from the Wehrmacht and other military operations of the Axis powers in Occupied France. Station Victor was especially vital to the success of Operation SUSSEX, communicating with the radio operators deployed with SI Branch OSSEX Teams to France on secret operations in the lead-up to the Normandy landings.

Station Victor's headquarters building was at Hurley Manor. The radio signals office and receiving site contained 8 radio huts and several communications masts, located on the top of Ashley Hill, near the town. The boosted transmitting tower was located down the river in Bisham. Lower-ranked soldiers and SI civilians were housed in a barracks facility at a local farmyard, while officers were provided requisitioned housing in the town. The bar of The Olde Bell was requisitioned as the officer's club.

The secret communications huts were torn down shortly after the war. Several blue plaques were donated by the OSS Society and unveiled in June 2019, marking some of the historic locations of Station Victor that are still standing.

For approximately a year between 1943 and 1944, in conjunction with SI at Station Victor, Special Operations Branch (SO) operated another OSS radio Station CHARLES on Poundon Hill in Poundon. However, these SO operators then moved to Station Victor in 1944 in the buildup to the Normandy operations.
