= Operation SUSSEX =

Secret intelligence operation

- Part of Operation Overlord
- This badge, designed by Captain Guy Wingate, was handed out to the survivors at a dinner party a few nights after the Liberation of Paris at Madame Goubillon's cafe.
Location	Occupied France

Belligerents
Vichy France; Germany	Free France; Canada; United States; United Kingdom

Commanders and leaders
	(United Kingdom) Kenneth Cohen; (Free France) Gilbert Renault; (United States) Francis Pickens Miller

Units involved
(Vichy France) Renseignements Généraux; (Vichy France) BMA; (Nazi Germany) Abwehr; (Nazi Germany) Gestapo	Pathfinder Teams (2x); BRISSEX teams (25x); OSSEX teams (29x); Station Victor; Royal Air Force; Carpetbaggers
- Operation details
- Operational scope: Secret intelligence
- Type: Joint intelligence operation
- Planned by: Tripartite Committee: (United Kingdom) Secret Intelligence Service; (United States) Secret Intelligence Branch; (Free France) BCRA
- Commanded by: (United States) General Eisenhower
- Executed by: (Free France) Free French Army
- Casualties: 12 - 16

Operation SUSSEX was a tripartite joint secret intelligence operation of the American Secret Intelligence Branch (SI) at OSS/London, the British Secret Intelligence Service (SIS or MI6), and the French Bureau Central de Renseignements et d'Action (BCRA). The plan under which this operation was carried out was Operational Plan SUSSEX, or simply the SUSSEX Plan (French: Plan SUSSEX). During SUSSEX, the BCRA recruited exclusively French soldiers from within the Free French Army who were trained in espionage tactics in the UK and then dropped by parachute into Occupied France in two-person teams to report on the locations of strategic and tactical military targets and objectives in the lead-up to D Day, and especially the Normandy Landings. These teams, collectively known as the SUSSEX Network, were deployed to areas not already covered by the existing espionage capabilities of the French Resistance.

The SUSSEX teams were divided into BRISSEX teams and OSSEX teams. BRISSEX teams were managed, trained, and deployed by the British SIS into the British-Canadian 21st Army Group objective areas north of the Seine. OSSEX teams, managed, trained, and deployed by the American OSS, were those dropped into American objective areas south of the Seine. One agent in each team was trained as an observer. The other agent in each team was specially trained as a radio operator. The radio operators of Brissex teams reported to SIS station STS 53a or STS 53b and the radio operators of Ossex to OSS WT station Victor.. They also communicated, during Ginger ground/air operation, with special operator called Boffin on board B25 Mitchell of RAF 226 Squadron. They used the Mk XXII Klaxon (VHF), developed by Section VIII of the SIS (At higher altitude & greater range than the S Phone (UHF) of the SOE). These Boffins were Joseph KESSEL, André BERNHEIM, Georges BAILLY, Pierre AMBRE, Eugène GIACOMINI and Hervé DOYEN. AIR 27/1407/14 - RAF 226 Sqn Logs.

In total, 120 SUSSEX agents were parachuted into Occupied France as a part of Operation SUSSEX. BRISSEX teams were dropped by the Royal Air Force, and OSSEX teams were dropped by the Carpetbaggers. On D Day, there were already 7 BRISSEX and 7 OSSEX teams deployed behind enemy lines reporting on enemy movements. Overall, between February and September 1944, 2 Pathfinder teams and 52 SUSSEX teams were parachuted into Axis-occupied territories.

== Background ==
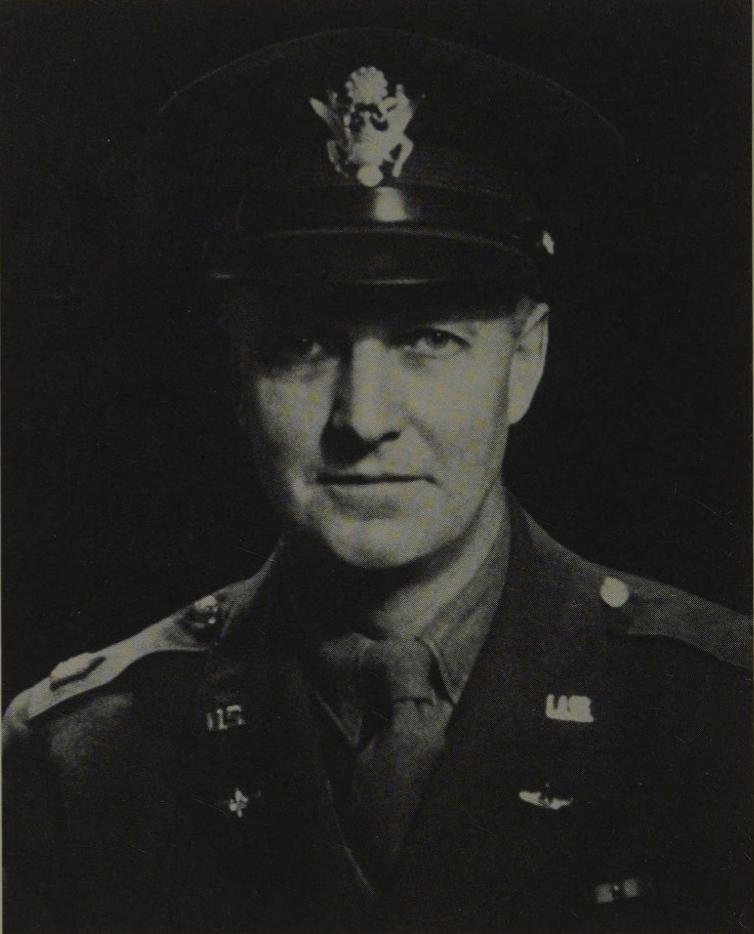
David K. E. Bruce, formerly the chief of the Secret Intelligence Branch in Washington, was by this point Chief of OSS/London, the largest field headquarters of the Office of Strategic Services (OSS).

Shortly after the British were forced off of mainland Europe at the Dunkirk evacuation, plans were already underway to reopen the Western Front. Franklin Roosevelt and Winston Churchill were in constant communication after Churchill became Prime Minister of the United Kingdom, where Churchill convinced Roosevelt – through a cadre of British officers stationed at the British Security Co-ordination and American officers visiting the UK – to establish an American intelligence agency. That was first the Office of the Coordinator of Information (COI), which became the Office of Strategic Services (OSS).

Led by Brigadier General William "Wild Bill" Donovan, the OSS was designed as a centralized intelligence agency, whereas the British had already begun decentralizing their own intelligence apparatus after 1941, creating an organizationally functional distinction between secret intelligence and special operations. As a result, when OSS/London was established, the branches of OSS formed relationships with their British counterparts. OSS/London, the largest OSS foreign headquarters, was overseen by David K. E. Bruce for the bulk of the war.

The counterpart of the Secret Intelligence Branch was the Secret Intelligence Service (SIS or MI6), led by Stewart Menzies, known as C. By 1942, the British intelligence apparatus had gone through radical transformation – the unit known as the Section for Destruction had been removed from its purview to be combined with Military Intelligence (Research) to create the Special Operations Executive (SOE). SIS no longer had any mission tasking for sabotage, destruction, special operations or guerrilla warfare, and left those missions to the SOE, while it maintained the dominion of secret intelligence.

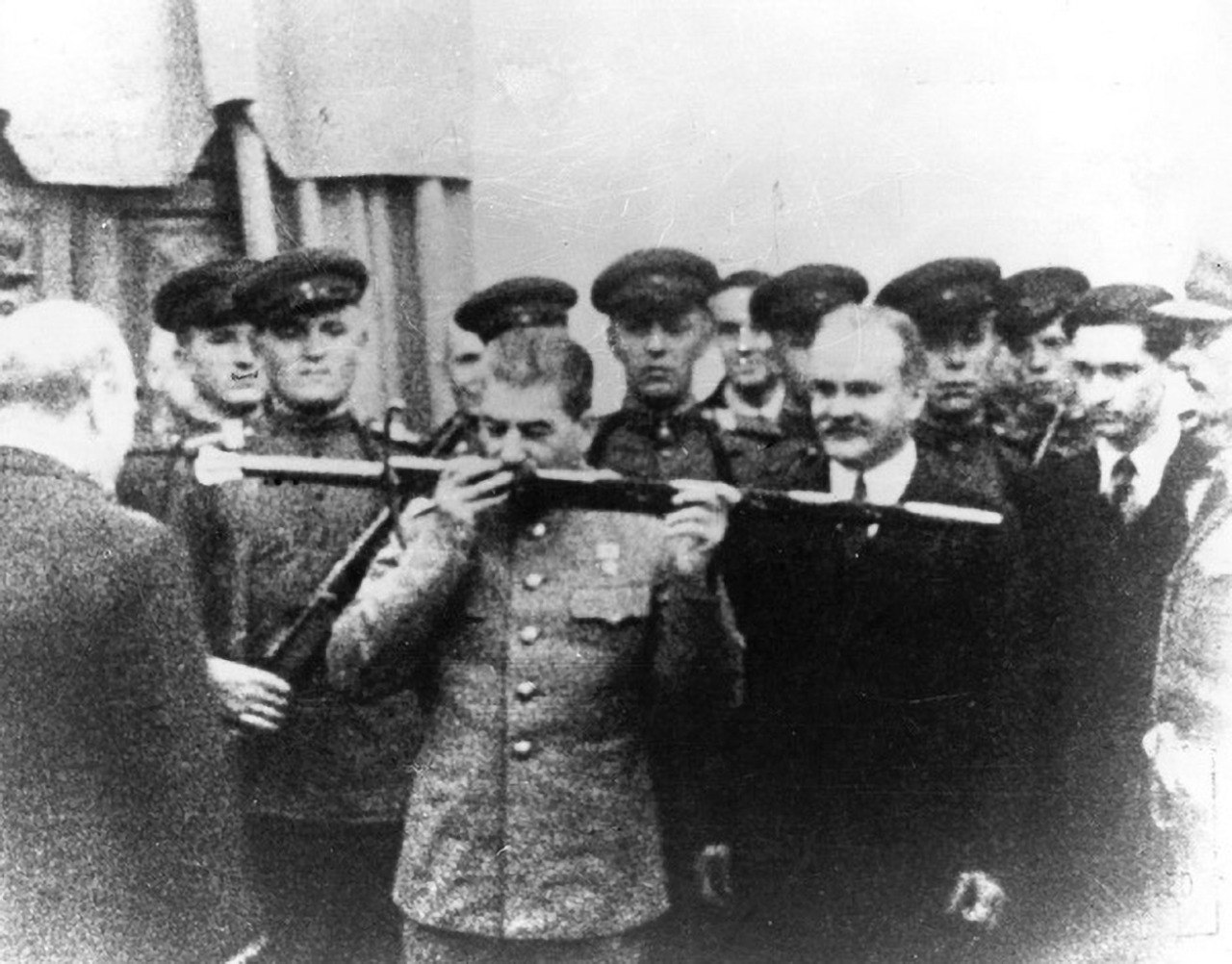
Joseph Stalin pictured sniffing a sword at the Tehran Conference. At Tehran, he greatly encouraged Roosevelt and Churchill to commence with Operation Overlord.

After the establishment of Vichy France, the French counterpart to Roosevelt and Churchill became Charles de Gaulle, operating out of the territories of Free France, and his followers were nicknamed "Gaullists." The Bureau central de renseignements et d'action (BCRA) was the intelligence arm of the Free French government.

Despite Nazi Germany's plan for a "thousand year Reich," the Axis in Europe were already hard-fought and losing ground on the Eastern Front from Operation Barbarossa against the USSR, in the North African campaign from Operation Torch, and elsewhere. At the Tehran Conference, the leaders of the French, British, and American intelligence agencies and militaries began to finalize plans for Operation Overlord.

COSSAC and the Supreme Headquarters Allied Expeditionary Force (SHAEF) knew that Operation Overlord needed secret intelligence prior to the landings at Normandy to identify military targets.

== SUSSEX Plan (1943-1944) ==
=== Developing the plan, interagency politics ===
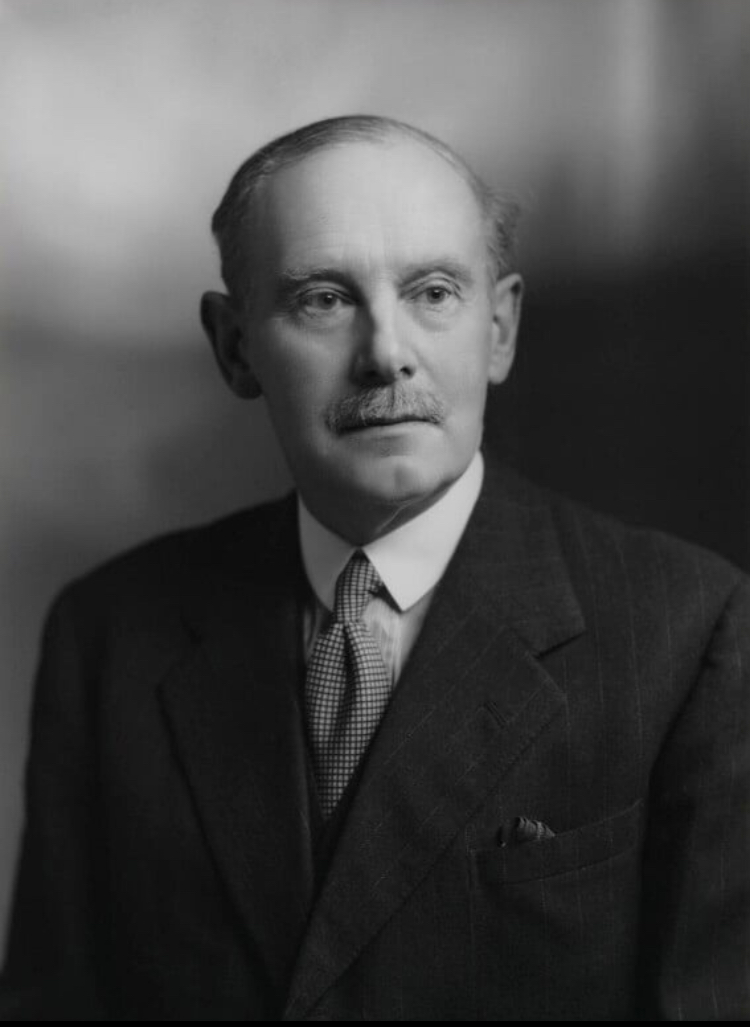
Stewart Menzies, known as "C," was the chief of the Secret Intelligence Service, at the time referred to as "Broadway."

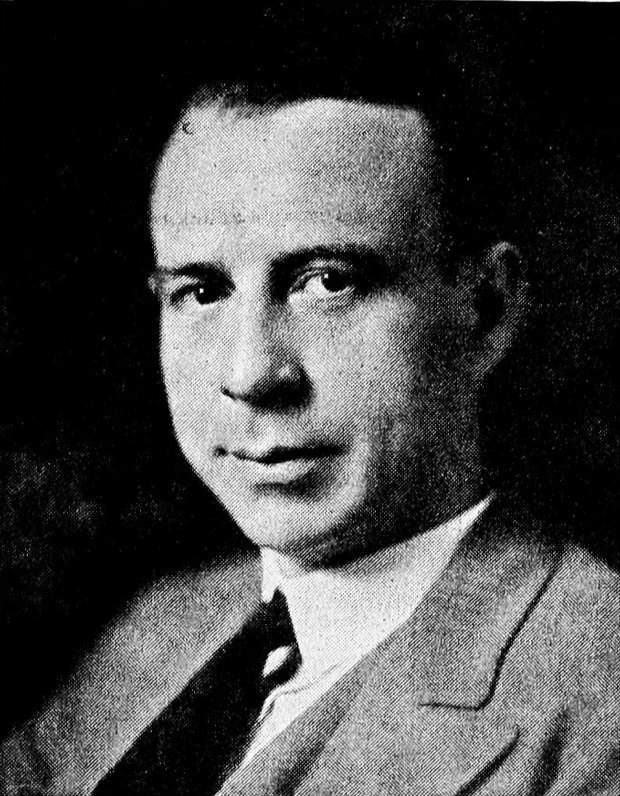
Whitney Shepardson, formerly the chief of SI/London, was by this point the chief of the Secret Intelligence Branch (SI) in Washington.

During the planning stages of the invasion of Occupied France, the Secret Intelligence Branch (SI) was seeking to develop stronger ties with their British counterparts, but the British were hesitant that the Americans might compromise their existing intelligence networks. In March 1943, an OSS officer named Stacy Lloyd developed what was called initially the Lloyd Plan. The Lloyd Plan called for:

"...the organization of a number of two-man intelligence teams, equipped with [clandestine radio sets], to be dropped well behind the lines at the time a Continental bridgehead was being established."

In the vision of SI/London, and especially the chief of SI/London, William P. Maddox, these teams would be solely American officers recruited from the US Airborne that would be reporting via radio to OSS/London alone. Stacy Lloyd and Bill Maddox wanted this operation to prove that SI could operate independently of the British, especially because they had faced much opposition from both General Jacob L. Devers and Claude Dansey to the notion of joint operations in the year of 1942, which hindered most of their intelligence gathering efforts up to that point. The Lloyd Plan specified that about 50 teams of two men would be deployed behind enemy lines, to be attached to the airborne units of the invading armies.

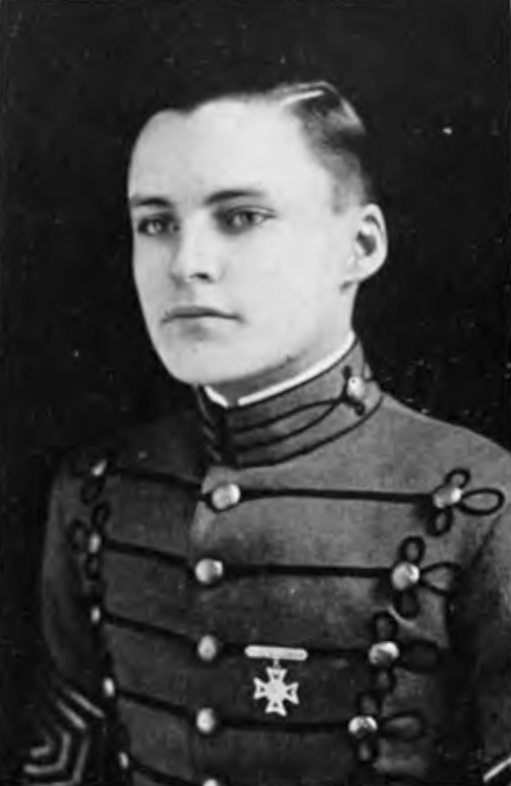
Bill Maddox (pictured here in 1921) took over from Shepardson as Chief of SI/London in 1943.

On April 1, 1943, Maddox wrote to David Bruce recommending the Lloyd Plan. The only alternatives to this plan, he wrote, would be to find groups opposed to the Axis that were not working with SIS, or to accept a secondary position to British supremacy in intelligence collection on the continent. Bruce took the Lloyd Plan to William J. Donovan in May 1943, who rejected the plan on the 6th of June.

However, before Donovan had cabled his rejection, David Bruce and Stewart Menzies had already met on the 28th of May to solidify a new tripartite arrangement between SIS, SI, and the Gaullists. By that time, "Uncle Claude" Dansey had already been removed from his position as deputy director of SIS by Stewart Menzies, replaced by James Marshall-Cornwall, who was more amenable to the American position.

In lieu of the Lloyd Plan going forward being only an American operation, Stewart Menzies put forward the suggestion of a joint operation that would work alongside the French. Bruce and Menzies organized access to "...a common pool of about a thousand Frenchmen..." The Lloyd Plan was around this time transformed into the SUSSEX Plan.

In mid-June, Bruce reported to Washington that SUSSEX had already begun recruiting French agents, and the plan was in place for roughly 25 SUSSEX teams to be deployed.

Also in mid-June, Menzies cabled in a message to his superiors at Whitehall that:

"...a new agent system superimposed on the existing one is necessary [because] the Germans would tighten their security measures in occupied France [when] they felt an Allied invasion was growing imminent ... Existing Allied sources of intelligence information would be discovered and liquidated."

The primary motivation for this cable was that the British, French, and the Americans knew that the existing networks of French Resistance operatives on the continent had been infiltrated by the Direction centrale des renseignements généraux (RG) and the Bureau des Menées Antinationales (BMA), being the official government intelligence agencies of Vichy France, and even possibly by the Abwehr or the Gestapo.

On July 5, 1943, the SUSSEX Plan was submitted to the US Command for approval. That approval came three months later.

On November 13, the joint SUSSEX School was made operational. SI/London provided five instructors. David Bruce and Bill Donovan coordinated and worked with the British Chiefs of Staff and the Joint Chiefs of Staff to produce the proposal that SUSSEX could move forward. However, it took several months for Donovan to convince the US commanders that SIS should not be allowed to treat SI as an inferior branch, as the plan put forth by the British chiefs of staff to place SUSSEX under the authority of SIS and COSSAC alone was, in his words: "...tantamount to regulating the OSS communications activities to those of a basic training depot and supply dump..." With the appointment of General Eisenhower as the Supreme Commander, the situation became more amenable for SI/London, despite the continued objections of Claude Dansey.

=== Tripartite Planning Committee and the recruitment process (1944) ===
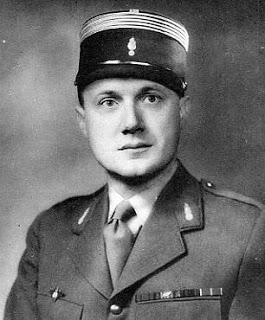
Gilbert Renault at BCRAL was one of the masterminds of SUSSEX, and also gave the operation its name. After the landings at Normandy succeeded, Renault joined the T-Force on its march to Paris, entering the city with them.

The plan was officially given a planning committee on January 4, 1944. This Tripartite Planning Committee, also called the SUSSEX Committee, or the Tripartite Control Committee, was staffed by Kenneth Cohen from SIS as chair of the committee, Francis Pickens Miller from SI/London, and Gilbert Renault from the Bureau central de renseignements et d'action (BCRA), who was known to his agents as "Colonel Rémy".

All three of these men had previously had great experience managing spies. Kenneth Cohen, who went by the pseudonym "Wagon," was the SIS case officer for all Resistance operatives in Occupied France, including the Alliance Network led by Marie-Madeleine Fourcade. Cohen had spent the final days of the First World War in the Grand Fleet participating naval boarding operations during the Scuttling of the German fleet at Scapa Flow.

Gilbert Renault had been one of the creators of the Notre-Dame Brotherhood. He had also been in charge of a French Resistance intelligence network that was betrayed to the Germans, and he had to escape the country by boat.

After 1943, and the realignment of Free French Forces, the London branch of the BCRA was known as Bureau Central de Renseignements et Action et Londres, or BCRAL, which for security purposes maintained a separate command structure from the main BCRA command in Free France. BCRAL was often referred to as "the Gaullist intelligence organization in London."

=== Recruitment ===
The British SIS recruited from the beginning for BRISSEX from French refugees who had escaped to Britain.

The American SI/London originally attempted to recruit for OSSEX from those: "among such personnel as may be available in the United States, refugees, prisoners of war, and labor groups, although it was anticipated that the cooperation of SI in Algiers and Madrid would be enlisted." At the time, there were some French officers receiving military training for the program in the United States, but the French, and especially Renault, were worried that those Frenchman had too many close associations to Vichy France. OSS dispatched a recruiting officer from London to Algiers, where at least several SUSSEX agents were recruited.

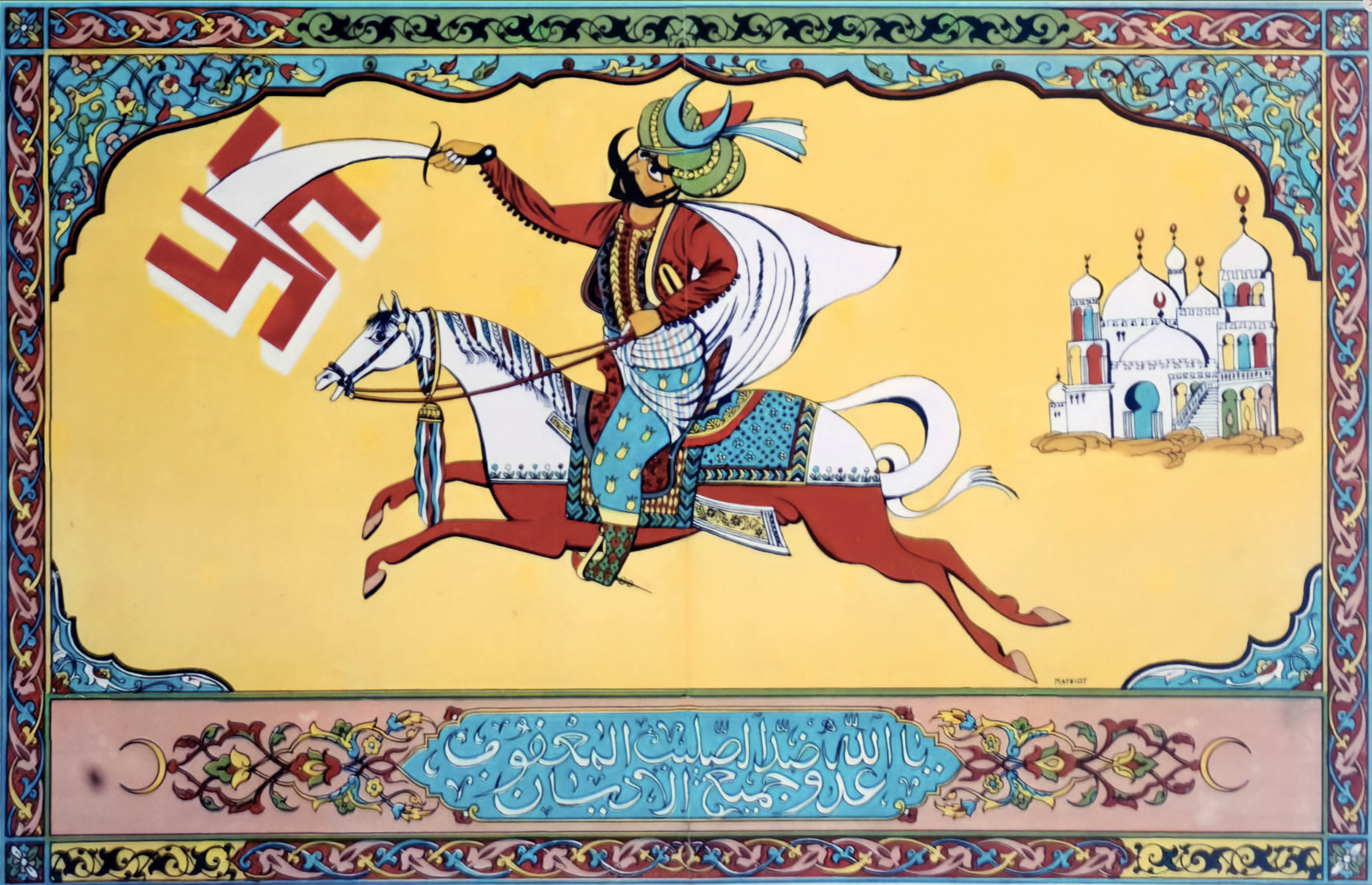
The majority of SUSSEX agents were recruited from the North African territories of Free French Africa.

In September, the Committee determined that not only should every operator be of French nationality, they should have a military background and have left France after 1941. They determined that half of the number should be officers, and the other half should be NCOs.

The bulk of the SUSSEX agents were recruited by BCRAL, providing a pool of agent candidates who were reviewed by the SUSSEX Selection Board. Some of them had escaped France by sea, or over the Pyrenees, but most of these recruits had come from Free French Army units based in North Africa. The French BCRA commander at Algiers, André Pelabon, however, was distrusting of any activities involving Americans, fearing that many of them had taken the side of Henri Giraud in the "De Gaulle–Giraud Dispute," which had pitted De Gaulle against Giraud in the autumn of 1943. The recruiters from BCRAL, SIS, and OSS did eventually convince Pelabon to send recruits to London.

Overall, between 60 and 70% of the recruits sent to the SUSSEX Selection Board were rejected.

=== Training ===
Before selection for training, SUSSEX members had to pass through even more rigorous checks at the Victoria School Intelligence Centre, including physical examinations and psychological testing. Of the 355 volunteers who had been sent to London, only 120 were selected to participate in Operation SUSSEX.

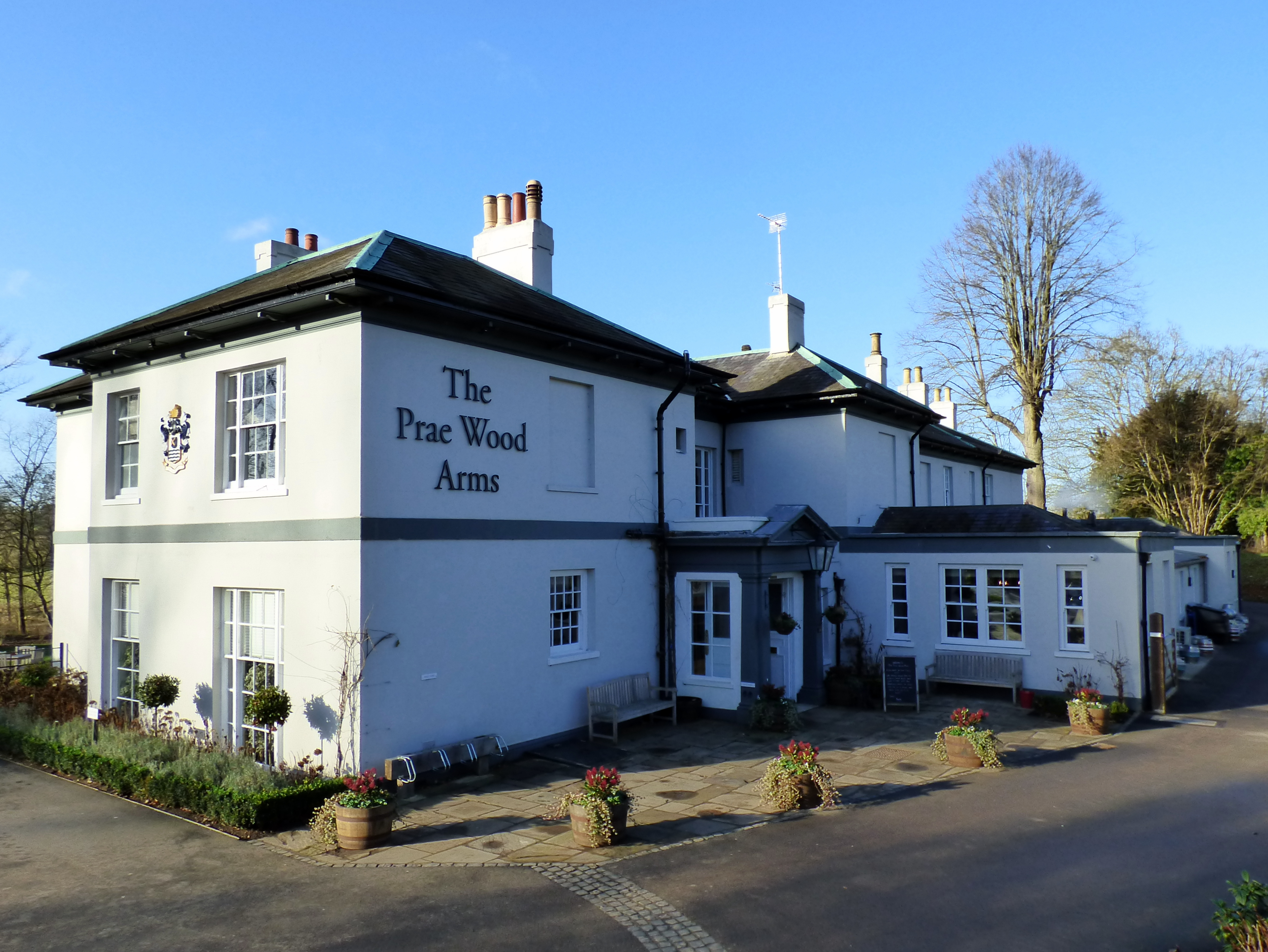
The Prae Wood Arms in St Albans was used as the mess for the SUSSEX training school.

Training in intelligence management and collection was instructed by officers from the Secret Intelligence Service(SIS) and the Secret Intelligence Branch (SI), at a schoolhouse established by SIS at the Glenalmond House school on King Harry Lane in St Albans. Meals were provided at the Prae Wood Arms, on Garden House Lane.

Physical training was taught by a joint team of members of the Royal Marines and the United States Marine Corps. One of these two instructors was named Sergeant Robichaud, and the other was named Sergeant Homola. They were taught Close Quarters Combat, silent killing, and especially how to sever the cervical vertebrae. They were taught Marine combatives and participated in boxing matches.

They were trained how to recognize enemy uniforms, vehicles, and how to identify potential targets. Land navigation courses were set up, especially to accurately communicate targets using the allied grid coordinate system. Agents were also taught how to identify landing zones for night landings of liaison aircraft like the Lysander or Hudson.

There was a driver's education course, defensive driving course, and training in driving and handling trucks, motorcycles, and coaches. They were trained to use a variety of firearms and weapons, including grenades, plastic explosives, combat knives, and others.

While SUSSEX was not a sabotage mission, these agents were also taught methods of subtle sabotage in the event that their French Resistance partners would request them to participate in future sabotage missions.

Parachute training took place at the Ringway Airfield.

Each of the radio operators were taught how to use specialized radio equipment, which were designed to fit into ordinary suitcases. Observers were also taught the basics of radio communication in case their operators died. Agents were taught how to communicate in morse code, and given Allied codebooks.

== Operation SUSSEX (1944) ==
=== Pathfinder missions ===
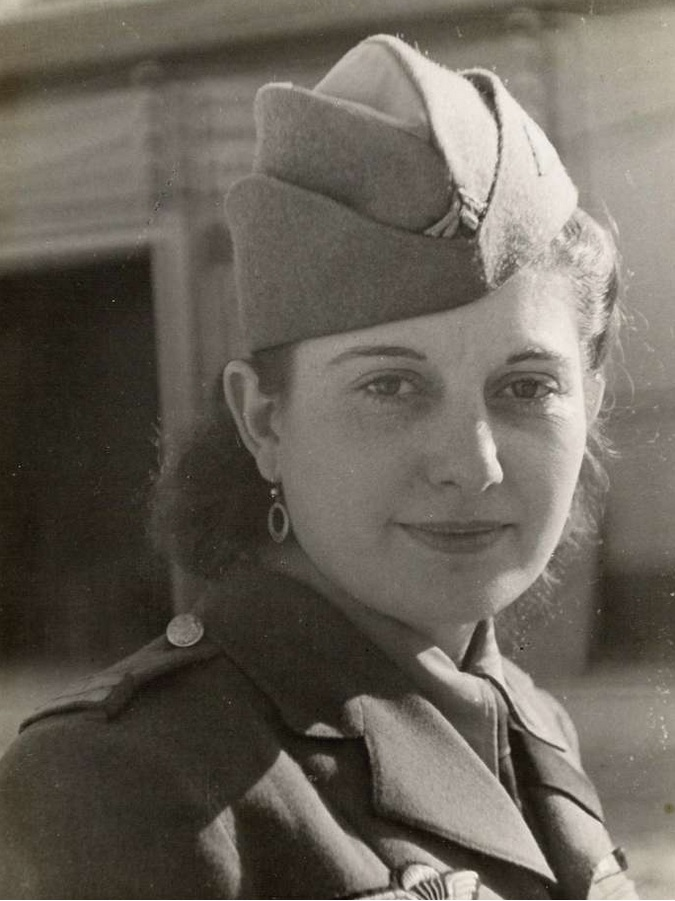
Jeannette Guyot was perhaps the most famous of the SUSSEX Pathfinders.

Before the SUSSEX teams were deployed, teams of advanced scout Pathfinders were sent ahead of the main SUSSEX teams to identify suitable drop zones for the operation, and to coordinate with French Resistance members who would act as reception committees for BRISSEX and OSSEX agents. The first Pathfinder mission was deployed on February 8, 1944. Two Pathfinder officers were captured some time in February, but would not be executed until August, a month after D Day. Because of the dangers involved in the Pathfinder missions, SUSSEX was slightly delayed, but the Pathfinders were ultimately successful in identifying suitable drop zones.

The Pathfinders then sent encoded messages to London, where they were decyphered by SI/London and SIS personnel. Code names were given to the drop zones at OSS/London and Broadway. After the drop zones were reviewed in London against the existing locations of German air bases and known flak sites, the Air Ministry checked the timetables, moon cycles, and meteorology to determine adequate flight departures. The 801st Bombardment Group and the RAF were then given tasking for flight missions to carry OSSEX and BRISSEX teams.

After the SUSSEX Committee reviewed the plans again, from England BBC Radio then broadcast secret coded instructions to the reception committees stationed near the drop zones in France.

==== Café de Mme Andrée ====
At 8 Rue Tournefort in the 5th arrondissement of Paris, there was a cafe called the Café de Madame Andrée, and it was next door to an office of the Gestapo. This cafe was owned by Madame Andrée Goubillon, who was the cousin of Jeannette Guyot, perhaps one of the most famous of the SUSSEX Pathfinders. Guyot asked Madame Goubillon to use the café as a Parisian radio station where her Pathfinder team could communicate intelligence reports to England. Goubillon said yes, and from then on, the café served as Guyot's Paris headquarters, and Guyot was then able to travel throughout France to identify new targets. Being so close to the Gestapo, radio finder triangulation was made impossible.

After SUSSEX commenced, the café became the Paris safehouse for any agents in the city. Madame Goubillon would house and feed "her boys" as they passed through the city.

=== SUSSEX missions ===
Known mission locations

On April 9, 1944, the first OSSEX team and 2 BRISSEX teams were dropped into Occupied France. By D Day, there were already 7 OSSEX and 7 BRISSEX teams deployed in France.

Once radio communications were received and passed to SHAEF, they were then relayed to the relevant field commands and military units involved in Operation Neptune. The 1st US Army and SHAEF highly praised reports sent in by SUSSEX. Especially Kenneth Strong, who said that secret agents were one of his main sources of information in planning for Operation Overlord. Edgar Williams of the 21st Army Group Brigadier General Staff highly appreciated the information he received on the movements of German armored units.

Not all SUSSEX missions have been entirely declassified. The known locations of SUSSEX missions include targets and objectives in these French cities:

- Paris
- Evreux
- Bayeux
- St Pol de Leon
- Rennes
- Laval
- Angers
- Saumur
- Tours
- Blois
- Le Mans
- Alençon
- Orléans
- Vendôme
- Bourges
- Dijon
- Montargis
- Chartres
- Dreux
- Rouen
- Beauvais
- Le Bourget
- Vincennes
- Juvisy
- Melun
- Troyes
- Reims
- Épernay
- Sézanne
- Romilly-sur-Seine
- Arras
- Amiens
- Lille
- Roubaix
- Cassel
- Maubeuge
- Valenciennes
- Saint-Quentin
- Cambrai
- Laon
- Soissons
- Strasbourg
- Épinal
- Nogent-en-Bassigny
- Montbéliard
- Besançon
- Aire-sur-la-Lys
- Freneuse

==== BRISSEX ====
BRISSEX teams landed in the British-Canadian objective areas. By the end of June, 1944, 22 messages were disseminated by BRISSEX teams. After D Day, other SIS agents started to "dry up" as sources of intelligence, as many of them were executed by the Germans, and BRISSEX agents were highly relied upon.

==== OSSEX ====
By the end of June, 1944, 12 OSSEX teams had sent 87 reports to England. Eight more OSSEX teams were deployed in July.

Overall, more than 800 secret messages containing over 1200 items of intelligence were communicated by OSSEX teams to Station Victor during SUSSEX. These messages were received at Station Victor, or by passing aircraft, then passed to the SI/London Operations Room, and translated and processed by the Reports Division. The Reports Division then sent on this intelligence to SHAEF, and the SI Field Detachment Units once those were deployed in Operation Neptune. This process took between one or two days.

In official OSS documents, the most important OSSEX team intelligences were those related to the movements of the Panzer Lehr Division on the battlefield.

=== Double agent ===
One morning, when George Clauzel, the observer for team PLAINCHANT, was transmitting a radio message at 2am, he heard the door burst in downstairs. He broke his radio and attempted to fight off the Germans as they advanced on him. The Germans captured him, and took him to be interrogated for six days.

While he was being interrogated, without revealing any information, a German Wehrmacht lieutenant walked into the room. The German lieutenant asked "Do you recognize me?"

Clauzel did recognize the German – he was one of the SUSSEX radio instructors back in England. Because of this double agent, the Germans knew the names of at least four SUSSEX agents, and knew the timetables for all SUSSEX transmissions. They did not, however, possess the code keys to decipher transmissions.

Clauzel was tortured for information, but he did not provide the keys. He was transferred to a concentration camp in Occupied Czechoslovakia, and there he managed to escape. His report is found in the official SI War Diary.

== Operation PROUST ==
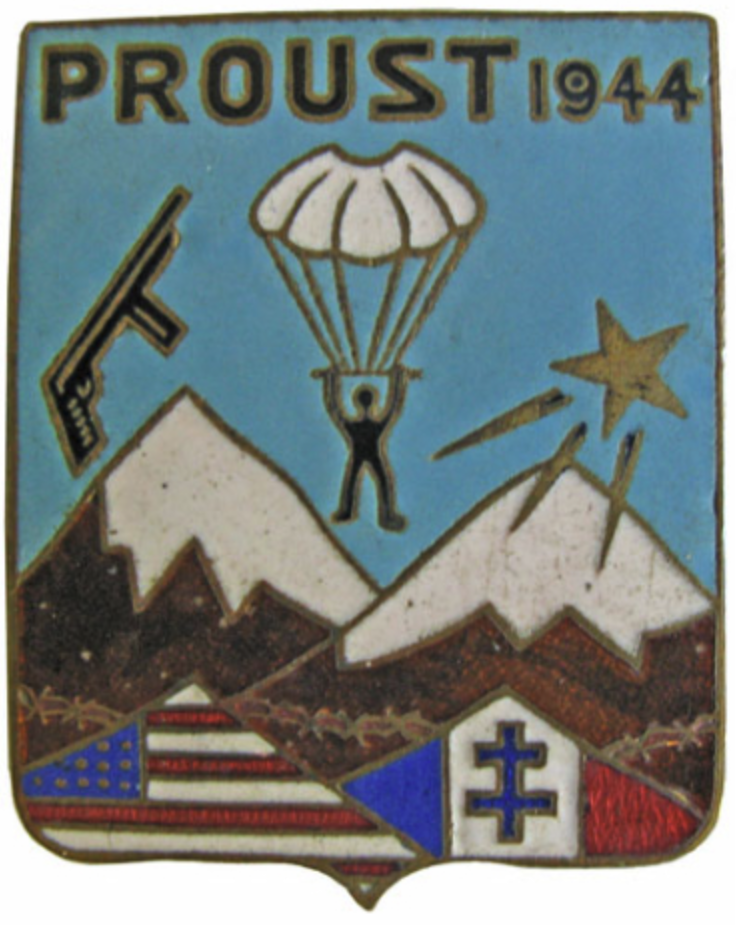
This badge was awarded to those survivors who took part in Operation PROUST.

In February 1943, William Donovan suggested that the Americans and the French create a reserve pool of agents in case anything happened to SUSSEX operatives. This reserve agent pool became Operation PROUST, also known as the PROUST Plan.

There were many reasons for his concern, but chiefly among them were that anything might happen to the SUSSEX agents after D Day. It was assumed that many more of the SUSSEX agents would be captured or killed than were killed in reality, or even that their planes would be shot down before SUSSEX operatives could arrive at their destinations.

Unlike SUSSEX, PROUST was an operation only under the control of SI/London and the BCRA. In total, 43 French agents were deployed between July and September, grouped into 7 missions.

As the allied militaries advanced and overtook their positions, PROUST was considered ended, and largely a success.

== Legacy ==
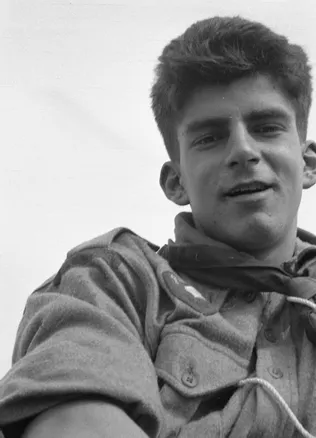
Jacques Voyer was tortured and executed only a few months after he took this self portrait.

Out of the 120 SUSSEX operatives in total, 8 BRISSEX agents and 6 OSSEX agents were captured, killed, or disappeared, mostly in August 1944.

Because of the SIS policy of "neither confirm nor deny," it is more difficult for historians to verify the exact numbers of BRISSEX agents killed or captured.

The Rifles of Nioche were five OSSEX agents captured on August 9 in the area of Nioche in Saint-Ouen, Loir-et-Cher, and executed on the 14th of August:

- Evelyne Clopet, aliases Chamonet and Claude
- André Noël, alias Ferrière
- Aristide Crocq, alias Dutal
- Roger Fosset, alias Girard
- Marcel Biscaïno, alias Maurin

Another OSSEX agent killed was Jacques Voyer. He was wounded and captured on June 19, 1944. He was then tortured for eight days, and was executed on June 27. Voyer's last words were: “You can say that I died like a Frenchman and a good Christian. Long live France!”

René Veuve was buried in Arlington National Cemetery in 2013.

For her actions during SUSSEX, Jeannette Guyot, an OSSEX member, was one of only two women awarded the Distinguished Service Cross during the war.

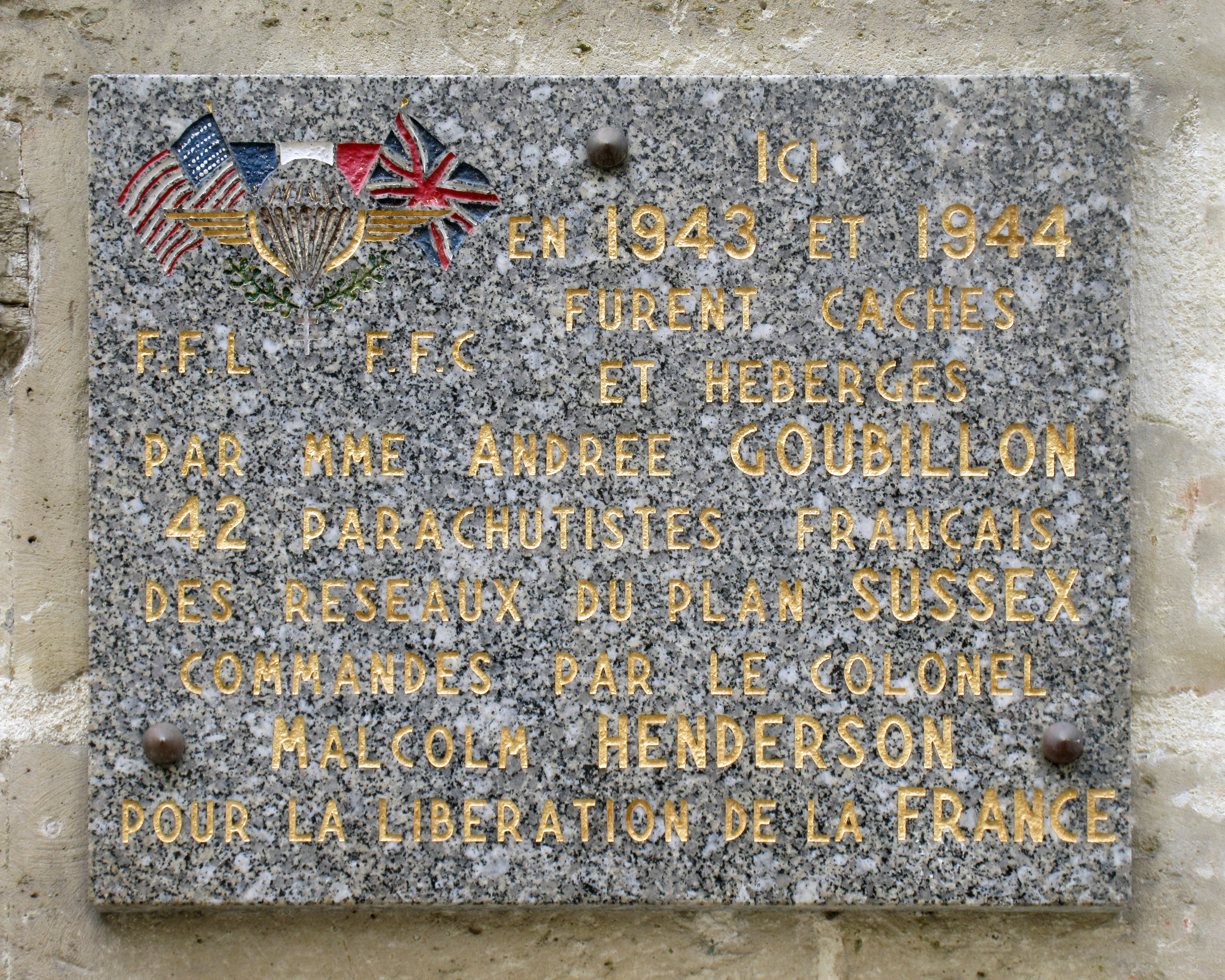
This plaque, at 8 Rue Tournefort, is placed where the Le Cafe des Sussex once stood.

=== The SUSSEX Cafe ===
On the day of the full Liberation of Paris, in September 1944, Madame Andrée Goubillon renamed her cafe Le Cafe du Reseau Sussex, shortened in its later days to Le Cafe des Sussex, in honor of the SUSSEX and PROUST operations. Until her death in 1988, Madame Andrée hosted reunion dinners here for the surviving members of SUSSEX. This cafe no longer exists, but there is a plaque where it once was. Often, members of the community will hang flowers off of this plaque. There is a cafe next door to the original SUSSEX Cafe, called "La Côte ou La Cuisse."
