= René Joyeuse =

French-American spy and physician (1920–2012)

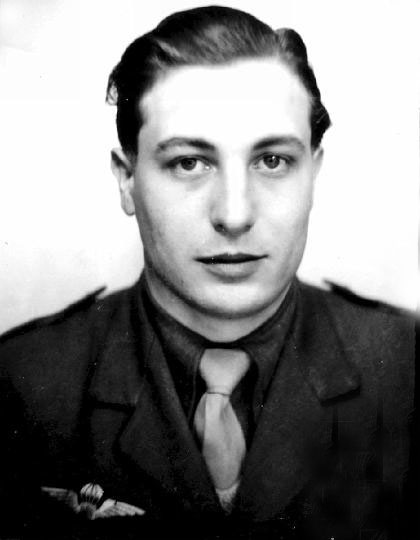
- René Joyeuse, 1944
- Born: René Veuve; 17 January 1920; Zürich, Switzerland
- Died: 12 June 2012 (aged 92); Lake Placid, New York, U.S.
- Burial place: Arlington National Cemetery
- Military career
- Branch: Free French Forces; French Resistance; Office of Strategic Services
- Unit: OSSEX
- Conflicts: World War II; Operation SUSSEX; First Indochina War
- Awards: Congressional Gold Medal; Distinguished Service Cross; Legion of Honour; Order of Liberation; Médaille militaire; Croix de guerre 1939–1945 with palm; Croix de guerre des théâtres d'opérations extérieures with palm; Médaille de la Résistance with rosette; Croix du combattant volontaire 1939–1945; Médaille des Évadés; Médaille de l'Aéronautique; Order of the Million Elephants and the White Parasol Kingdom of Laos

René Joyeuse, M.D., MS, FACS (17 January 1920 – 12 June 2012) was a Swiss, French and American soldier, physician and researcher. He distinguished himself as an agent of Allied intelligence in German-occupied France during World War II.

== Early life ==
René Joyeuse was born as René Veuve on 17 January 1920 in Zürich to poor parents, a French carpenter and an Italian housemaid employed in Alsace. Raised and educated in France and Switzerland, Veuve studied philosophy at the universities of Besançon and Montpellier, graduating magna cum laude in 1940.

== Military service ==
Following the German invasion of France in 1940, Veuve joined the Free French Forces, in which he reached the grade of captain. He worked for the U.S. Office of Strategic Services (OSS) and with the Résistance in northern France, and as a parachutists' instructor in the United Kingdom. The OSS assigned him the codename Joyeuse ("joyful"), after Charlemagne's sword.

In April 1944, with 120 other agents as part of Operation Sussex, he was tasked with gathering intelligence about enemy military installations, supply depots and troop movements in northern France, in preparation for the upcoming Allied invasion. Deployed by parachute near Chartres, disguised as a postal worker, Veuve acquired and transmitted information about crucial enemy infrastructure, such as Le Bourget airport, an oil refinery and an underground rocket factory. Over sixty messages were transmitted, which covered enemy movements at airfields, troop identifications, V-I manufacturing plants, underground factories and important gasoline depots. Although no provision had been made for the transmission of intelligence by courier, he showed great initiative in getting through to London two pouches of very valuable information on a naval powder factory and an oil refinery, both of which were subsequently heavily bombarded by allied aircraft. To avoid radiolocation of his signal, he emplaced himself close to a German military unit's transmitter.

After the Allied invasion, Joyeuse shifted his operations further inland, on one occasion narrowly escaping an SS raid with a bullet wound in his foot, while his two bodyguards (Louis Barrault and Pierre Gastaud) were captured and executed on 18 August 1944 in Aulnay Sous Bois. With the advancing Allied forces he eventually reached Germany, being one of the first Allied officers to reach the Bergen-Belsen concentration camp.

After the end of World War II, René Veuve adopted his codename "Joyeuse" as his surname. He served for five years as a French intelligence officer in the First Indochina War, where he often assisted field surgeons in treating the wounded. The appalling death rate – he estimated that only one in 12 wounded survived – inspired him to help find better treatments for trauma victims, and in 1950 he gained admission to the medical school at the University of Paris.

For his wartime actions Joyeuse received multiple decorations. He was awarded the Distinguished Service Cross by Dwight D. Eisenhower. The French government awarded him the title of knight of the Legion of Honour, the Order of Liberation, the Médaille militaire, the Croix de guerre 1939–1945 with palm, the Croix de guerre des théâtres d'opérations extérieures with palm, the Médaille de la Résistance with rosette, the Croix du combattant volontaire 1939–1945, the Médaille des Évadés, the Médaille de l'Aéronautique, the Colonial Medal and several commemorative medals. The Kingdom of Laos awarded him the Order of the Million Elephants and the White Parasol. On March 21, 2018, the U.S. Congress awarded the Congressional Gold Medal, the highest civilian award of the United States, to all the men and women of the OSS.

== Post-war career ==
Joyeuse met his wife Suzanne, a nurse, at the University of Paris. After graduation, the couple emigrated to the United States, where Joyeuse worked as an emergency and trauma surgeon at the Mayo Clinic while also pursuing a master's degree in surgery at the University of Minnesota, and later as a researcher at the UCLA medical school.

While at UCLA, Joyeuse helped develop the first biological heart valve replacement. As assistant professor of surgery at the College of Medicine and Dentistry of New Jersey (Rutgers / CMDNJ) he was a practicing trauma surgeon, co-founder of the American Trauma Society and president of the New Jersey chapter, and was actively involved in training physicians and EMT personnel in trauma care. The family changed residence multiple times, eventually settling in Saranac Lake, New York, where Joyeuse served as the medical director of the prison system of the state of New York.

René Joyeuse died on 12 June 2012 after having suffered from Alzheimer's disease for the last ten years of his life. He was survived by his wife Suzanne (1929–2020) and his two sons. He is the first person born in Switzerland to be honored with a burial in Arlington National Cemetery, in March 2013.
