= Hurley, Berkshire =

Coordinates: 51°32′35″N 0°48′29″W

Hurley
- Village and civil parish
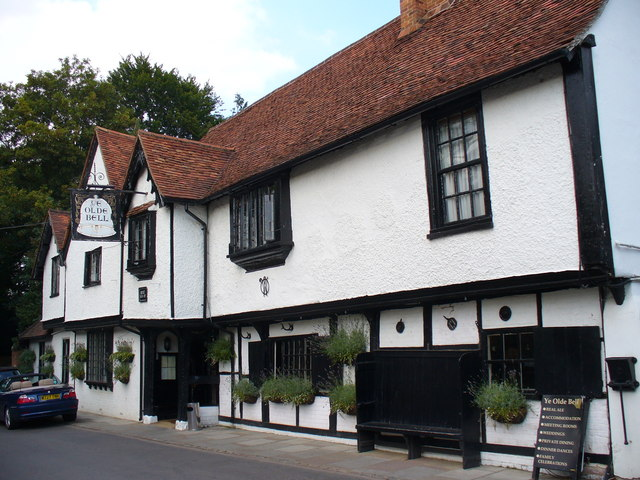
- The Olde Bell inn, originally the guest house for Hurley priory

- Location within Berkshire
- Population: 1,854 (2001); 1,923 (2011 Census)
- OS grid reference: SU826834
- Civil parish: Hurley
- Unitary authority: Windsor and Maidenhead
- Ceremonial county: Berkshire
- Region: South East
- Country: England
- Sovereign state: United Kingdom
- Post town: Maidenhead
- Postcode district: SL6
- Dialling code: 01628
- Police: Thames Valley
- Fire: Royal Berkshire
- Ambulance: South Central
- UK Parliament: Maidenhead

Hurley is a village and rural civil parish in Berkshire, England. Its riverside is agricultural, except for Hurley Priory, as are the outskirts of the village. The Olde Bell Inn adjoining the priory is believed to date from 1135.

== Topography ==
Hurley is a linear development perpendicular to and adjoining the Upper Thames 4 miles (6.4 km) NW of Maidenhead and 3.5 miles (5.6 km) ENE of Henley-on-Thames, Oxfordshire on the A4130. The parish includes the hamlets of Cockpole Green, Warren Row, Knowl Hill, Burchett's Green and part of Littlewick Green. Ashley Hill Forest, almost 2 miles (3.2 km) south of the village, is close to and almost equidistant between Warren Row, Knowl Hill and Burchett's Green and is the largest woodland. Other than this, the parish is mainly agricultural; however, many farms have spinneys of woodland adjoining.

== Historic structures ==
- By the river is Hurley Priory, a partially moated Benedictine priory founded in 1086 as a cell of Westminster Abbey. The priory was dissolved in 1536, but its priory church survives as the current parish church and is a Scheduled Monument.
- 'The Olde Bell' Inn is reputedly the oldest still-working inn in Britain; parts of the inn date to 1135, when it was the hostelry of the priory.
- The old manor estate of Hall Place (1728) is now the home of Berkshire College of Agriculture.
- The Manor House in the High Street was used as Station Victor, forming part of Operation Sussex, the running of agents in occupied Europe by the American OSS.
- The former main priory building became a mansion known as Ladye Place, which stood adjoining the present parish church. It was the home of the Barons Lovelace. It was demolished in 1837 as uninhabitable.
- The Grassland Research Institute (GRI) also had a facility at Hurley until 1992.

== Localities ==
=== Hurley Bottom ===
Only one of the buildings at the foot of the hill in the south of the village street is listed. This southerly neighbourhood has the local name of Hurley Bottom but is 10 m (33 ft) higher than the riverside parts of the village.

=== Frogmill Court and Frogmill Spinney ===
The early 19th-century Frogmill Court is now a farmhouse adjoining the river, which in this parish consists of mainly grazing and pasture meadows. The farmhouse is Grade II listed. Frogmill Spinney forms a riverside park housing estate. Another group of riverside homes is accessed by a separate lane.

== Recreation ==
Hurley is often used as a mooring for leisure craft and by campers. Cricket has been played in Hurley for over 100 years. The club currently plays in the Chiltern League on Saturdays and friendly fixtures against local rivals on Sundays. The ground has a London plane tree inside the boundary. The clubhouse was rebuilt in the 1970s after fire destroyed the previous wooden one. The Temple Golf Club was founded in 1909 and is recognised for its "picturesque [..] Thames valley views".

== In popular culture ==
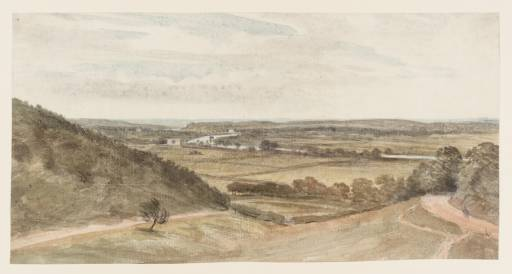
"View from Hurley Bottom", 1806 watercolour by William Crotch

- The composer William Crotch was also an artist, and completed the drawing "View from Hurley Bottom" on 30 August 1806.
- The village is mentioned in the 1889 comic novel Three Men in a Boat by Jerome K. Jerome
- The village is the setting for "The Invisible Millionaire", a short story in the Saint series by Leslie Charteris.

== Public transport ==
The village is served by a bus route from Maidenhead. Closest railway stations are Marlow, Maidenhead and Henley approximately four miles northeast, southeast and west respectively.
