= Jeannette Guyot =

French Resistance operative

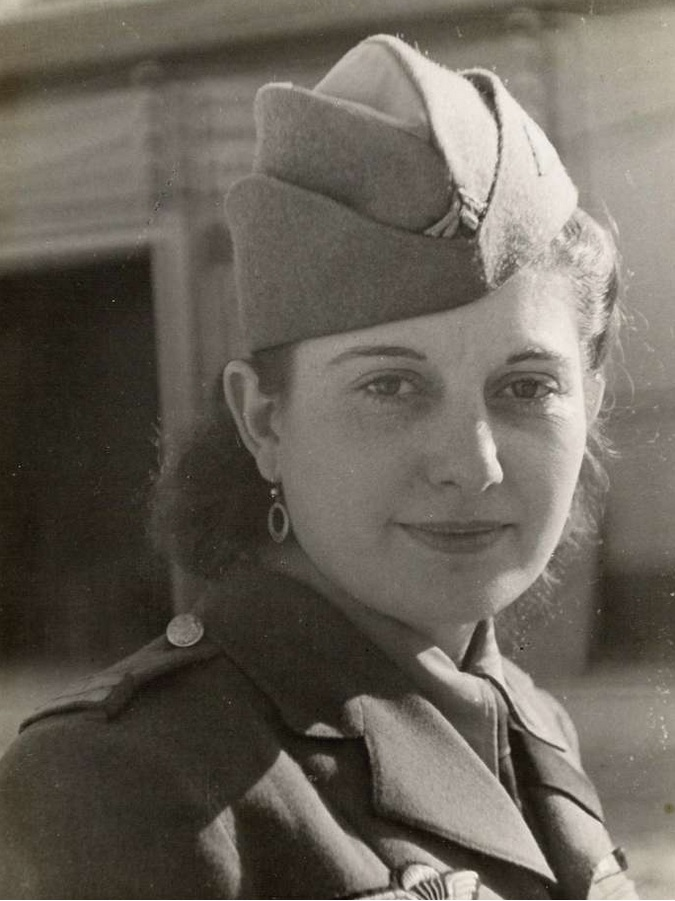
- Guyot in 1943
- Born: 26 February 1919; Chalon-sur-Saône
- Died: 10 April 2016 (aged 97); Sevrey
- Known for: Operation Sussex, WWII
- Spouse: Marcel Gaucher
- Children: Three
- Parent(s): Jean-Marie Guyot, Jeanne Guyot
- Awards: Legion of Honour; Distinguished Service Cross; George Medal
- Espionage activity
- Allegiance: Free France; United States; United Kingdom

Jeannette Guyot (French: [ʒanɛt ɡɥijo]; 26 February 1919 – 10 April 2016) was a French Resistance operative who went on to become one of the Second World War's most decorated women.

Guyot undertook numerous dangerous missions in Occupied France moving fugitives, collecting military intelligence, and assisting Allied agents.

The recipient of honors from France and the United Kingdom, Guyot is one of only two women to hold the American Distinguished Service Cross obtained during the war. She participated in the Pathfinder Mission of Operation Sussex. (Note: Operation Sussex's purpose was to gather intelligence on German troops formations. Operation Sussex is also referred to as the Sussex Plan.)

== Biography ==
=== Early resistance activities ===
Jeannette Guyot was born on 26 February 1919, in Chalon-sur-Saône. Her father, Jean Marie Guyot, was a timber merchant and mother, Jeanne Guyot, a seamstress. In the 1940s Guyot and her parents joined the French Resistance.

In 1940, Guyot became involved with the Amarante resistance network in Occupied France. She escorted fugitives from the Germans to the River Saône, where they would be ferried across to relative safety in Vichy France. In August 1941, Guyot became a liaison officer for Gilbert Renault, compiling intelligence about German Occupation forces and the Vichy Government.

In February 1942, while escorting a group of fugitives through Occupied France, Guyot was arrested by the Germans. She spent three months in prisons in Chalon-sur-Saône and Autun, then was released.

In early 1943, Guyot's parents were arrested separately for resistance activities. By 1944, the two had been deported to different concentration camps in Germany. (Note: She was among a group of women the Gestapo sold to the Swiss Red Cross in early April 1945.) With the Germans arresting members of Guyot's resistance networks, it became too dangerous for her to remain in France. On 13 May 1943, an RAF Lysander plane landed in a field near Luzillé and picked up Guyot for transport to England.

=== Operation Sussex ===
In the United Kingdom, Guyot enlisted in the Free French Forces under the name Jeannette Gauthier. After lobbying her superiors for several months to return to France, Guyot was sent to St Albans in Hertfordshire by the Secret Intelligence Service and Office of Strategic Services to train for Operation Sussex. In January 1944, Guyot received her parachute wings.

Guyot's first mission was Pathfinder, a part of Operation Calanque. On 8 February 1944, Guyot and three other French intelligence officers parachuted into Clion in Occupied France. Their mission was to find dropping zones and safe houses in Northern France for 52 teams of Operation Sussex agents and then assist these agents after they parachuted into France. Guyot chose the Cafe du Reseau as one safe house because the owner, Andree Goubillon, was a friend whose husband had been imprisoned by the Germans.

Guyot undertook many dangerous trips throughout the region, helping agents and reporting on Gestapo activities.

By 1 October 1944, Guyot had returned to the United Kingdom, where she was assigned to the Direction Generate des Etudes et Recherches of the Free French Forces. This was her final wartime assignment.

=== Post war ===
In June 1945, Guyot retired from the Direction Generale. While her father, Jean Marie Guyot, had died in Bavaria in 1944, her mother Jeanne was repatriated to France in 1945. (Note: She was among a group of women the Gestapo sold to the Swiss Red Cross in early April 1945.)

On 29 March 1947, Guyot married Marcel Gaucher, a former Operation Sussex agent. They had three children. Guyot died in Sevrey on 10 April 2016, age 97.

== Distinctions ==
France

- Legion of Honour
- War Cross 1939–1945
- Medal of Resistance

United Kingdom

- British George Medal

United States of America

- Distinguished Service Cross, only one of two women awarded the medal in World War II or since, the other being Virginia Hall.
