= Antoni Szymański =

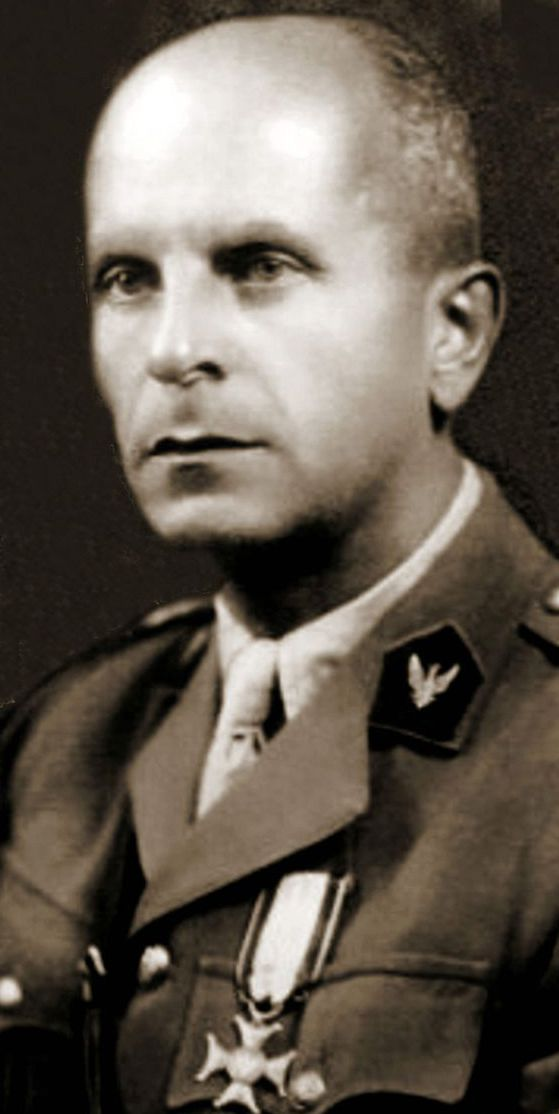
- Born: 30 July 1894; Poznań
- Died: 11 December 1973 (aged 79); London
- Spouse: Halina Szymańska
- Military career
- Allegiance: Poland
- Branch: Army

Antoni Szymański (Poznań, 30 July 1894 - 11 December 1973, London) was a Polish Army general the last prewar Polish military attaché in Berlin (1932-1939). On the night of 5–6 September 1939, he left Berlin for Copenhagen, then went to Wilno via Stockholm and Helsinki. He fought against the Germans at Lwów. After the surrender of Lwów on 22 September 1939, he became a Soviet prisoner of war, and remained until 1941 in several prison camps. He was released following the Sikorski-Mayski Agreement and joined the Polish army commanded by General Władysław Anders.

== Life ==
As a Prussian citizen, he fought on the Western Front during World War I (including the Battle of Verdun).

Antoni Szymański was the last prewar Polish military attaché in Berlin (1932-1939). On the night of 5–6 September 1939, he left Berlin for Copenhagen, then went to Wilno via Stockholm and Helsinki. He fought against the Germans at Lwów. After the surrender of Lwów on 22 September 1939, he became a Soviet prisoner of war, and remained until 1941 in several prison camps. He was released following the Sikorski-Mayski Agreement and joined the Polish army commanded by General Władysław Anders.

His wife, Halina Szymańska, as a British agent, met several times during World War II with Admiral Wilhelm Canaris and Hans Bernd Gisevius in Switzerland and Italy.

== See also ==
- List of Poles
