= Hurley Priory =

Former Benedictine priory in Berkshire, England

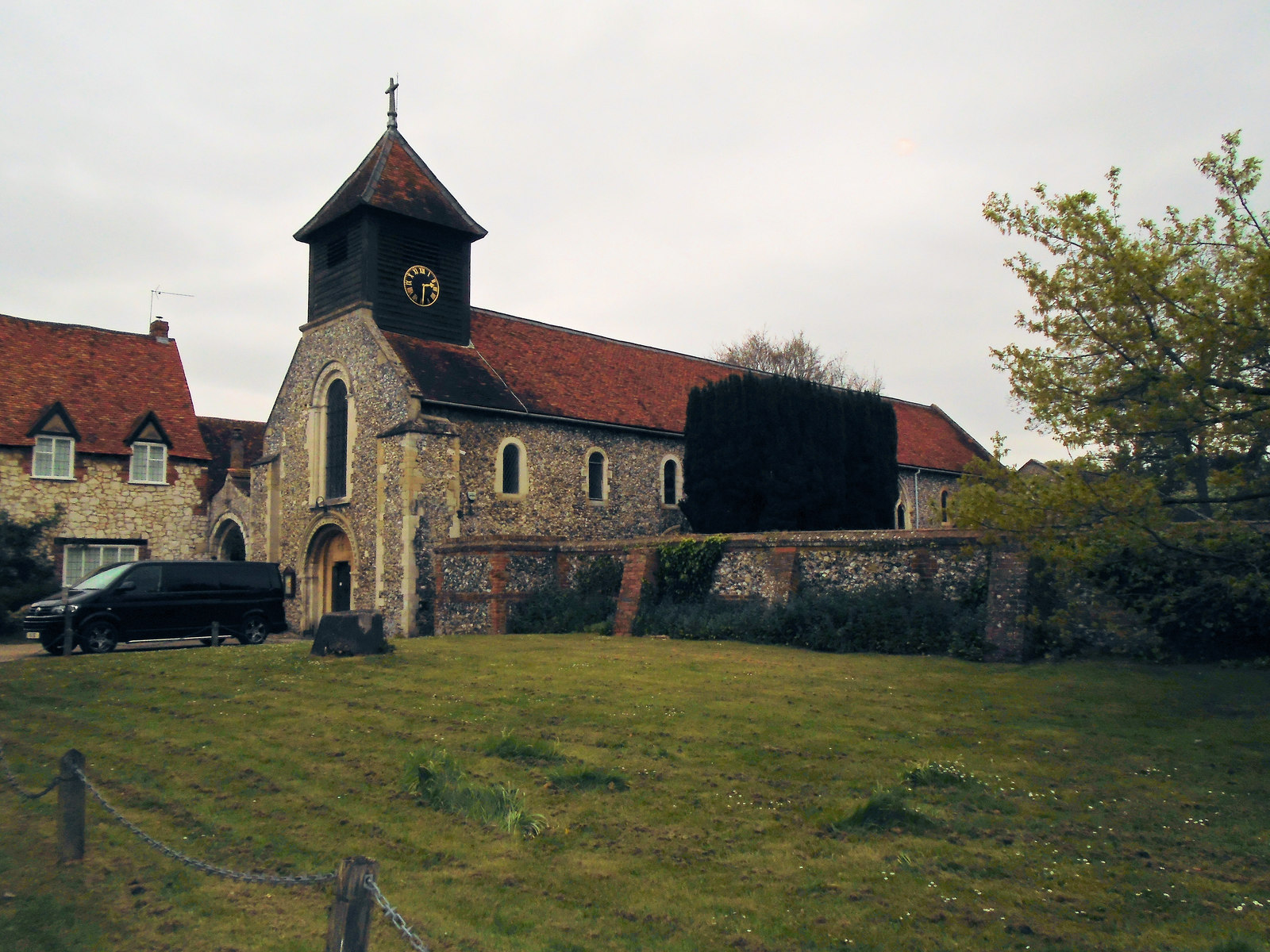
- St Mary the Virgin, Hurley

- Location within Berkshire

General information
- Location: Hurley, Berkshire, England
- Coordinates: 51.5496°N 0.8097°W

Scheduled monument
- Official name: Hurley Priory: A moated Benedictine priory and fishponds and the remains of Ladye Place Mansion
- Designated: 12 January 1949
- Reference no.: 1007933

Hurley Priory is a former Benedictine priory in the village of Hurley, Berkshire. The remains of the priory include the parish church of St Mary the Virgin, Hurley, the adjacent cloisters and refectory, now used as private houses, and a nearby barn and dovecote.

== History ==
The Priory of St Mary at Hurley was founded in 1086 by the Norman magnate Geoffrey de Mandeville I as a cell of Westminster Abbey.

The Priory was suppressed by Henry VIII in 1536, and ownership was transferred to Westminster Abbey. In 1540 Westminster Abbey was dissolved and the Hurley Priory property passed into lay hands.

The main Abbey property became known as Lady Place. It was initially owned by Charles Howard, Esq., for three years, then by Leonard Chamberleyn, Esq., then by John Lovelace, Esq. It was used as the residence of the Barons Lovelace. Lady Place was considered one of the great mansions in town, but it fell into disrepair and was demolished as uninhabitable in 1837.

== Surviving buildings ==
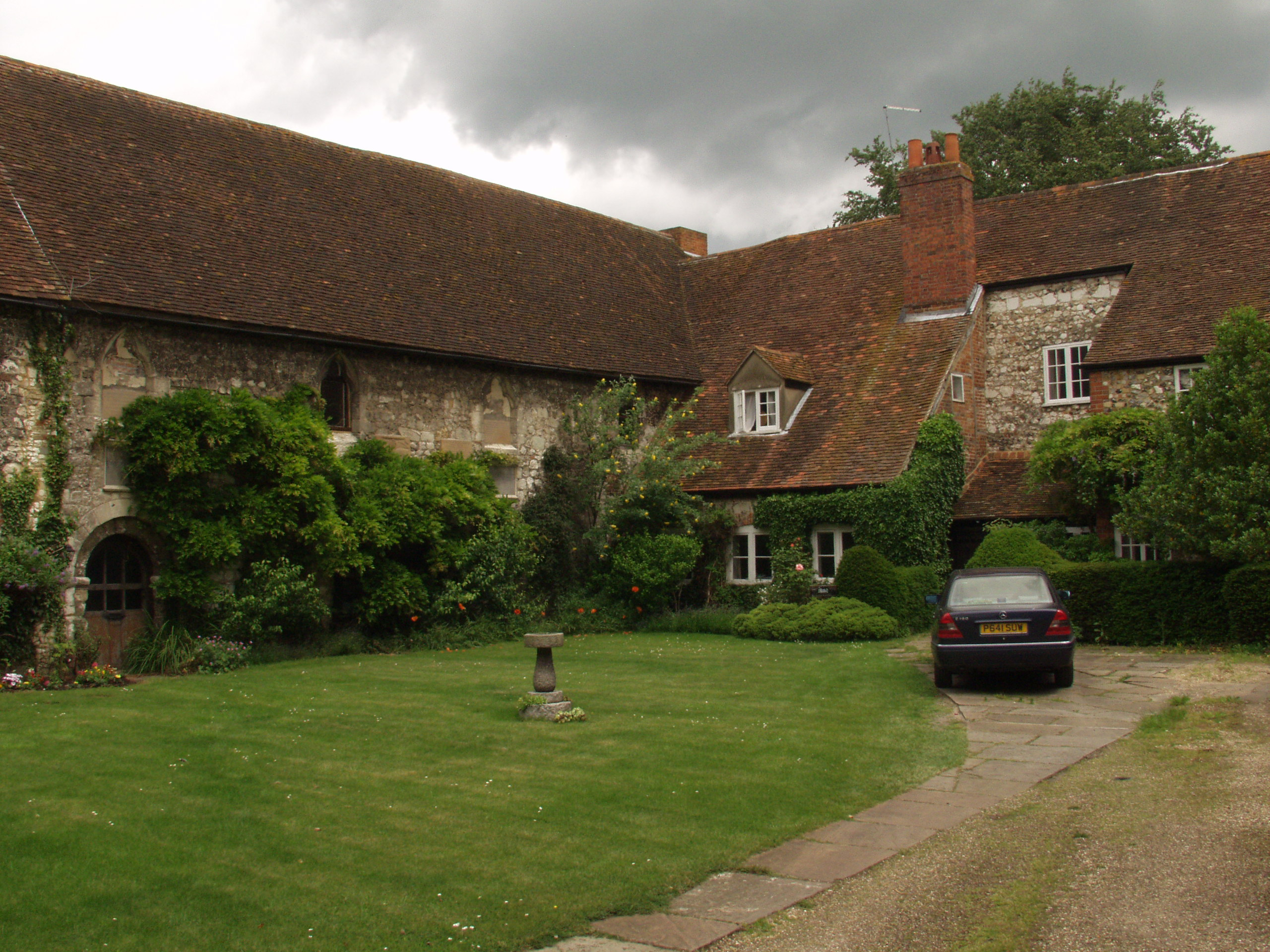
The refectory and cloisters buildings, now private houses

The long narrow nave of the priory church survives and is used as the Hurley parish church, dedicated to St Mary the Virgin. It has mainly Norman windows and doorways. To the north, the range of buildings containing the frater or monastic dining hall is incorporated into a private house. A probable monastic circular dovecote and a nearby larger barn, both to the west of the church, date from the early 14th century. The dovecote is Grade I listed, while the church, cloisters and barn are all Grade II* listed.

The Abbey's former hostelry or guesthouse is incorporated into the Grade II* listed Olde Bell Inn, one of the oldest still-working inns in Britain.

== Burials ==
- Richard Lovelace, 1st Baron Lovelace
- John Lovelace, 2nd Baron Lovelace
- John Lovelace, 3rd Baron Lovelace

== See also ==
- Grade II* listed buildings in Berkshire
- List of English abbeys, priories and friaries serving as parish churches
