= Thomas Kendrick (agent) =

British intelligence officer

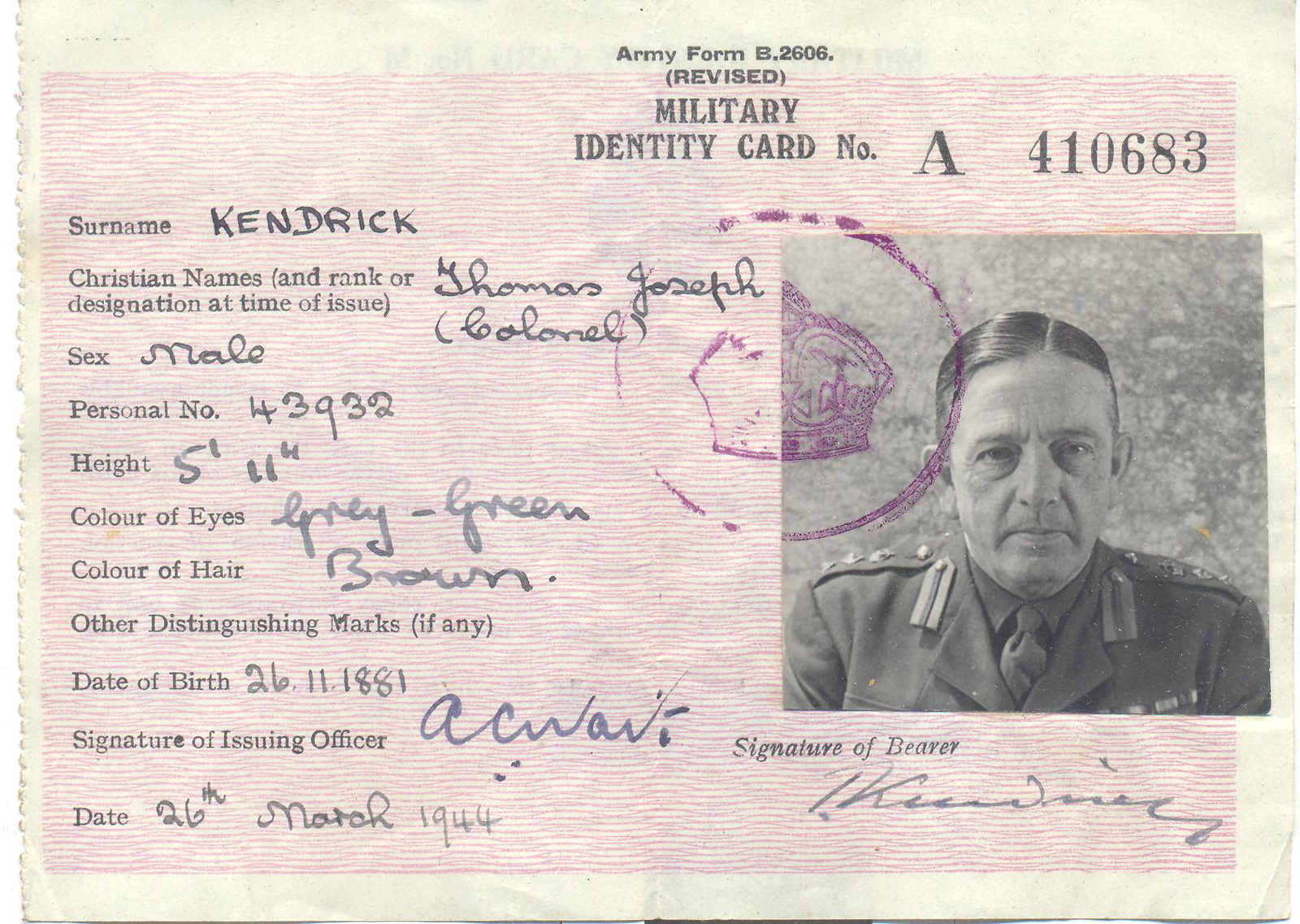
Colonel Kendrick's military identity card, issued 26 March 1944.

Thomas Joseph Kendrick (26 November 1881 - 3 March 1972) was a British intelligence officer, operating under the code name "Colonel Wallace".

== Life ==
Born in Cape Town, Kendrick grew up in Cape Colony and fought in the Second Boer War, going on to serve as a field intelligence officer in the First World War. From December 1925 to August 1938 he was based at the British Consulate in Vienna as 'station chief Europe' for the Secret Intelligence Service (SIS), also known as MI6 - its officers were given cover stories as employees of the Consulate's Passport Office.

Austria was annexed to Germany in the Anschluss of March 1938 and on 17 August that year Kendrick was visiting Freilassing in Bavaria when he was arrested for espionage by the Sicherheitsdienst. He was imprisoned in the Hotel Metropole, then the Vienna headquarters of the SS and Gestapo. The British Foreign Office intervened and on 20 August he was released and expelled from Austria, leading to the collapse of his intelligence network. The affair was reported in depth in German daily newspapers such as the Berliner Tageblatt, the Berliner Börsenzeitung and the Essen Nationalzeitung and also reached the international press.

In the months before his arrest, Kendrick came into contact with Adolf Eichmann, who was then in charge of negotiating the expulsion of Viennese Jews and their acceptance by the British Mandate of Palestine. As "Passport Control Officer" and in conjunction with his intelligence activities, Kendrick and the other members of the Passport Office were able to grant entry permits to Palestine to a large number of Austrian Jews in summer 1938, estimated at around 10,000 people. A recent biography has thus named him "Vienna's Oskar Schindler".

During the Second World War Kendrick organised a unit to set up secretly-bugged "M-Rooms" (mike rooms). Known as the Combined Services Detailed Interrogation Centre or CSDIC, it employed ex-patriat German and Italian intelligence officers to listen in on German and Italian prisoners-of-war in their bugged quarters and cells at three large country houses in the south-east of England converted to prisons: Trent Park in Middlesex, Latimer House, in Latimer, Buckinghamshire, and the Wilton Park Estate in Beaconsfield, also in Buckinghamshire. Kendrick was also assigned the task of using microphones to monitor and eavesdrop on Rudolf Hess after his flight to the UK in 1941.

In spring 1940 the Reichssicherheitshauptamt in Berlin assessed him to be a sensitive intelligence figure and he was thus placed on the Sonderfahndungsliste G.B., a list of those to be automatically arrested by the SS after a successful German invasion of Britain.

On 23 May 1945 he was awarded the Legion of Merit for his services to American intelligence. He worked for MI6 until his retirement in 1948. He died aged 90 in 1972 and is buried in the Municipal Cemetery in Weybridge, Surrey, where his wife Norah was also interred in 1977.
