= Georges Loustaunau-Lacau =

French politician and officer (1894–1955)

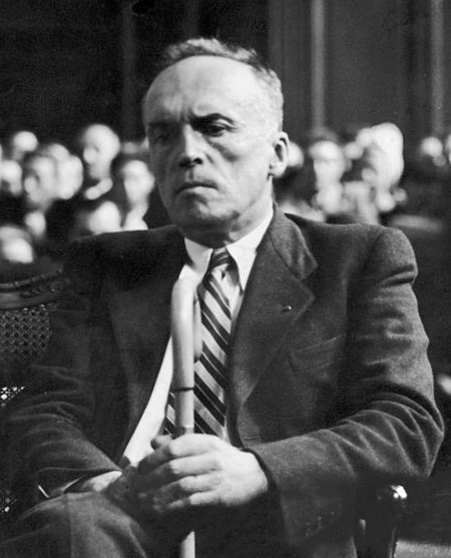
- Loustaunau-Lacau at the trial of Philippe Pétain in 1945
- Born: April 17, 1894; Pau, Pyrénées-Atlantiques
- Died: February 11, 1955 (aged 60) Paris
- Allegiance: French Third Republic (till 1940); Vichy France (1940–1944); Free France (1940-1944)
- Branch: French Army; Secret Intelligence Service; French Resistance
- Service years: 1912–1938, 1939–1955
- Rank: Brigadier general
- Conflicts: World War I; Battle of Verdun; Rif War; World War II; Battle of France
- Awards: Legion of Honour
- Education: École Spéciale Militaire de Saint-Cyr

Georges Loustaunau-Lacau (French pronunciation: [ʒɔʁʒ lustono lako]; 17 April 1894 – 11 February 1955) was a French army officer, anti-communist, anti-Nazi resistant, and politician. His codename in the French Resistance was Navarre. Before the Second World War, Loustaunau-Lacau was involved in extreme anti-communist activities. During the war, he was contracted by the British Secret Intelligence Service to spy on his bosses in the Vichy French government, organizing a massive movement in the French Resistance known as ALLIANCE, before being arrested in North Africa. His organization was taken over by the siblings Jacques Bridou and Marie-Madeleine Fourcade. He was sent to a concentration camp, but managed to escape. After the war, despite having been instrumental in the defeat of the Nazis, he was thought of as untrustworthy by the French, especially because he was an anti-Gaullist. His involvement in anti-communism was often seen as a smokescreen for Fascist sympathies.

== Life and career ==
Loustaunau-Lacau was born in Pau in Basses-Pyrénées (now Pyrénées-Atlantiques), and in 1912 began his studies at the French Army's officer school, the École Spéciale Militaire de Saint-Cyr. He served on the staffs of Maxime Weygand and Hubert Lyautey. Loustaunau-Lacau replaced Charles de Gaulle on the staff of Marshal Philippe Pétain in 1926. An officer with far-right and anticommunist views, he was one of the founders of the Union des Comités d'action défensive, also known as the Corvignolles network, the military branch of La Cagoule. His complicity with this organisation was discovered during the investigations ordered by Minister of the Interior Marx Dormoy, and he was dismissed from the army in 1938 by order of War Minister Édouard Daladier.

He was recalled to active service at the outbreak of the Second World War but was arrested on the orders of Daladier on 22 March 1940 and imprisoned at Obernai. Later in 1940, under Pétain's new Vichy regime, Loustaunau-Lacau was appointed to head the Légion française des combattants (LFC), a veterans' organisation created by Vichy France. Loustaunau-Lacau used his new post as a cover to recruit agents for a resistance organisation later known as the Alliance network. There he went by the code name "Navarre". He was replaced as the head of the LFC by Xavier Vallat and sent to French North Africa, where his former chief, Marshal Weygand, had him arrested in May 1941. Loustaunau-Lacau escaped and returned to France, where he was arrested and later deported to Mauthausen concentration camp. He survived his imprisonment and entered conventional politics after the war. He was elected to the National Assembly in 1951 to represent Basses-Pyrénées (now Pyrénées-Atlantiques). Although close to the overtly Petainist Union des nationaux indépendants et républicains, he won his seat as an independent. Loustaunau-Lacau was promoted to the rank of brigadier-general on 3 February 1955 and died in Paris eight days later.
