= The Olde Bell, Hurley =

Hotel and pub in Berkshire, England

The Olde Bell

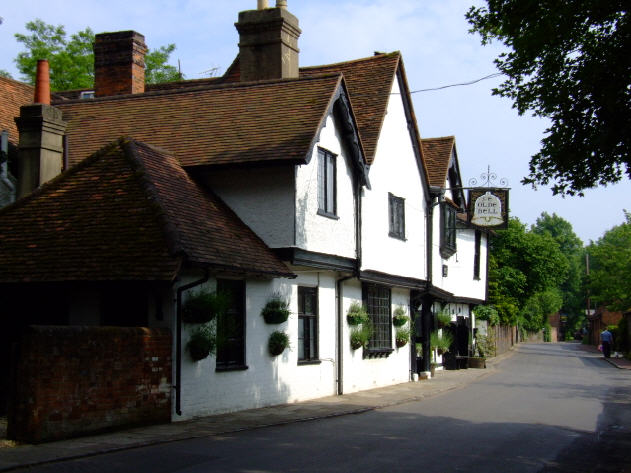

- Location within Berkshire

General information
- Type: Hotel, pub
- Architectural style: Elizabethan
- Location: High Street, Hurley, Berkshire, England
- Coordinates: 51°32′46″N 0°48′36″W
- Renovated: 17th, 19th and 20th century
- Landlord: Emina Estates Ltd

Technical details
- Material: Timber frame, painted brick infill, old tile gabled roof
- Floor count: 2

Other information
- Number of rooms: 48

Website
- www.theoldebell.co.uk

Listed Building – Grade II*
- Official name: Ye Olde Bell Hotel
- Designated: 25 March 1955
- Reference no.: 1156153

The Olde Bell is a hotel and public house in Hurley, Berkshire, England, on the bank of the River Thames. It is claimed to be the oldest hotel in the UK, and one of the oldest hotels in the world.

== History ==
The Olde Bell was founded in 1135 as the hostelry of Hurley Priory, making it one of the oldest hotels in the world. The coaching inn expanded in the 12th century to include a tithe barn and dovecote. The hotel is said to contain a secret tunnel leading to the village priory which was used by John Lovelace, who was involved in the Glorious Revolution to overthrow King James II in the 17th century. The hotel was also used as a meeting point for Winston Churchill and Dwight D. Eisenhower during World War II. Because of its proximity to Pinewood Studios, the inn has seen a number of film-star guests, including Mae West, Greta Garbo, Cary Grant, Errol Flynn, Elizabeth Taylor and Richard Burton.

== Description ==
The Olde Bell buildings are Grade II* listed. The hotel has interiors designed by Ilse Crawford.

== See also ==
- Grade II* listed buildings in Berkshire
