= Halina Szymańska =

Polish spy

- Born: 1906; Poland
- Died: 1989 (aged 82–83); England
- Known for: Working as a spy during World War 2

Halina Szymańska (1906–1989) was a Polish spy, working for the British government, known as the Allies' conduit to Nazi German Admiral Wilhelm Canaris. She was the wife of Colonel Antoni Szymański, the last prewar Polish military attaché in Berlin, and of later General Kazimierz Wiśniowski.

== Life ==
After being recruited by the Allied secret intelligence services (via Polish officers in Bern, Switzerland, who made contact with the British), Szymańska provided a conduit of information between the Allies and Admiral Wilhelm Canaris, chief of the German Abwehr. In autumn 1939 he helped her and her children move from occupied Poland to Switzerland in compensation for a contact with the British Secret Intelligence Service.

Szymańska, as a British agent, met several times with Canaris in Switzerland and Italy. Then she met with his courier, Hans Bernd Gisevius. Szymańska played an important role, as an intermediary, in secret contacts between the Allies and German anti-Nazi conspirators (e.g., the Schwarze Kapelle). In April 1940 she received information about the coming German attack on France and the Benelux countries. In mid-June 1941 Szymańska received information about the coming German attack on the Soviet Union. During World War II she became one of the most effective MI6 agents.

Szymańska had three daughters with Col. Antoni Szymański — Hanka, Ewa and Marysia. All four spent the war in Switzerland, where Halina began her work for MI6 and later the French Deuxieme Reseau, conducting courier work into occupied France, for which she was decorated by the French. Among others, she developed a working relationship with the American Allen Dulles, who then headed the American OSS intelligence office in Bern.

Dulles became the first civilian and the longest-serving (1953–61) Director of Central Intelligence, de facto head of the U.S. Central Intelligence Agency. By all accounts he was very supportive of Szymańska, particularly when her daughter Hanka became ill and died in Switzerland.

After World War II, Halina Szymańska moved to England and married General Kazimierz Wiśniowski, who had been Chief of Staff to General Władysław Anders, commander of the Second Polish Corps at the Battle of Cassino in 1944. She had one son with him, Piotr Wiśniowski. She settled in Ealing, a suburb of London. She lies buried with her second husband in South Ealing Cemetery.

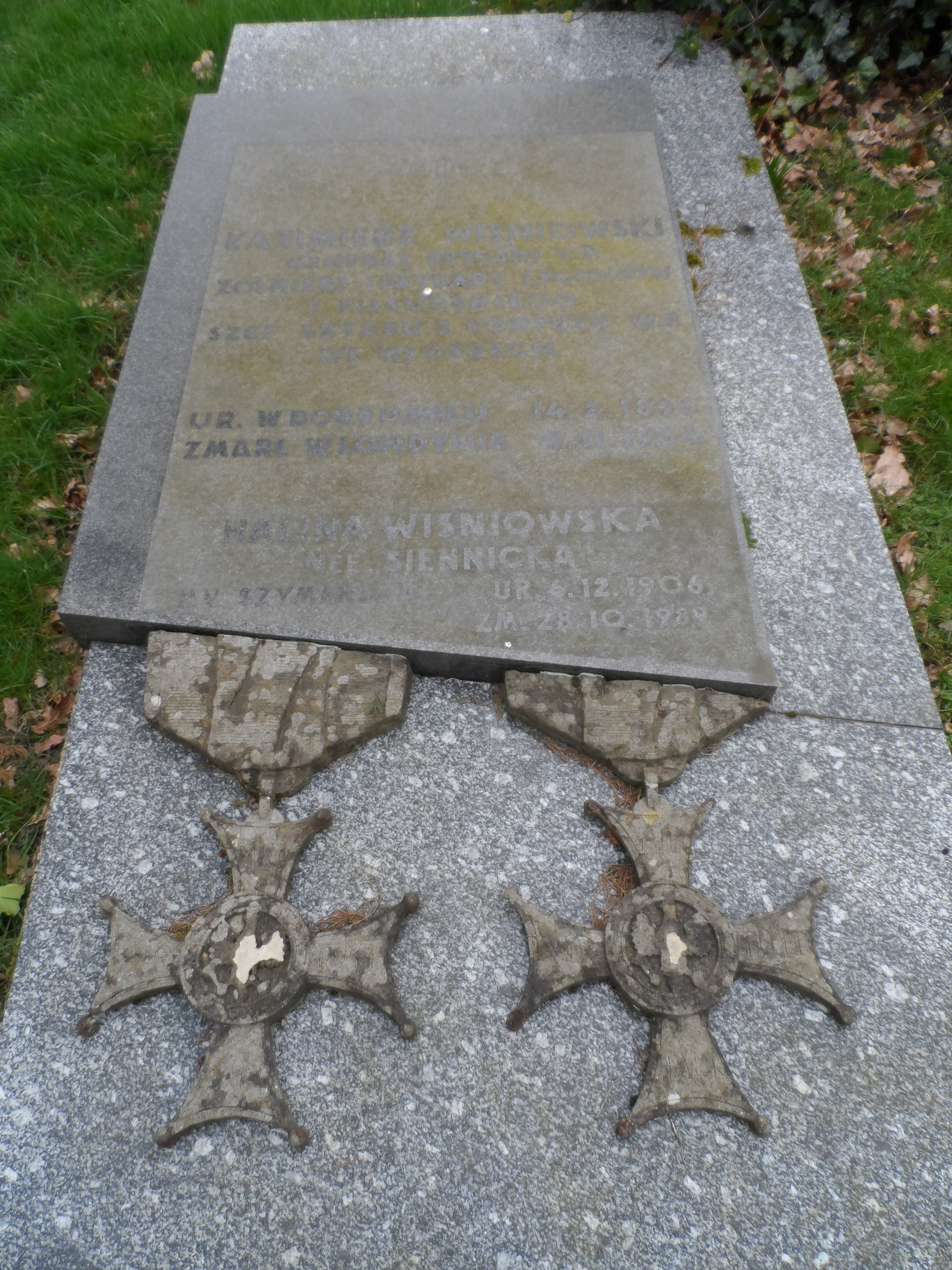
The shared grave of Halina Szymańska and her husband, Kazimierz Wisniowski.

Michael Fabian, many years later, assisted the English spy expert/writer (and MP) Nigel West - real name Rupert Allason - with the section of his book, MI6: British Secret Intelligence Service Operations, 1909-45, which dealt with his grandmother Szymańska. Among other documents, the book shows Halina's French identity card, which was forged by the MI6's printing expert, Mr Adams in Potters Bar, in order to enable her to travel to occupied France to meet Admiral Canaris, collect information and report back to the Allies in Switzerland. It also shows Mme Szymanska's diplomatic passport. Stamped with numerous entry and exit visas, it includes two relating to her rendezvous with Admiral Canaris in Italy, April 1941, at which he disclosed details of Hitler's imminent attack on the Soviet Union.

== See also ==
- List of Poles
