= Marie-Madeleine Fourcade =

French Resistance leader (1909–1989)

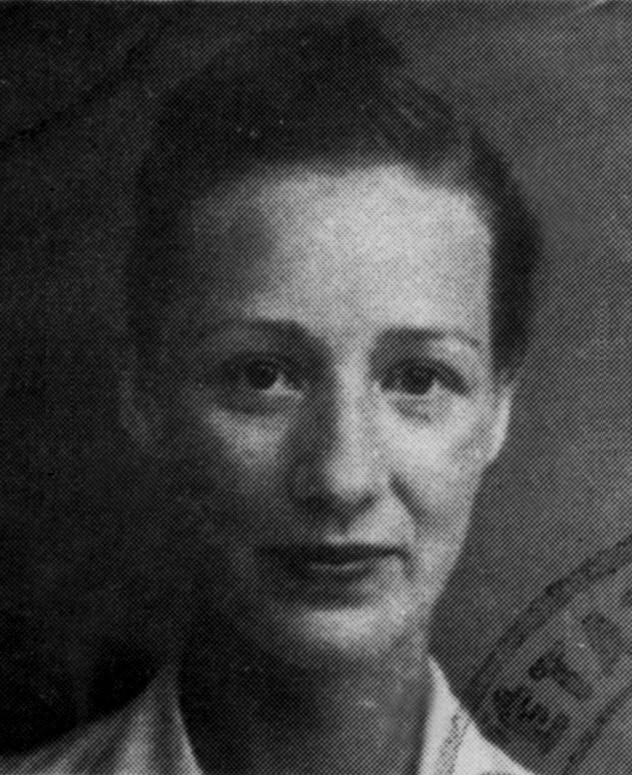
Marie-Madeleine Fourcade

Marie-Madeleine Fourcade (French pronunciation: [maʁimadlɛn fuʁkad]; 8 November 1909 – 20 July 1989) was the leader of the French Resistance network "Alliance", under the code name "Hérisson" ("Hedgehog") after the arrest of its former leader, Georges Loustaunau-Lacau ("Navarre"), during the German military administration in occupied France during World War II.

== Early life ==
Born Marie-Madeleine Bridou in Marseille, in Bouches-du-Rhône, she grew up and attended convent schools in Shanghai where her father had a position with the French Maritime service.

== Wartime resistance ==
Fourcade worked with Navarre on his magazine L'ordre national, an espionage publication. Navarre believed espionage to be crucial in the war effort. Navarre recruited Fourcade for a network of spies and to work on L'ordre national. She was barely 30 at this point. Her first mission for Navarre was to create sections of unoccupied France, then recruit and assign an agent to these sections. This network became the "Alliance" (later called "Noah's Ark").

In July 1941, a little over a year after the German invasion, Navarre was arrested and sentenced to two years in prison. He had picked Fourcade to lead the movement he had started. One example of her spying success was through her agent Jeannie Rousseau, who convinced a Wehrmacht officer to draw a rocket and a testing station on Peenemünde, thereby revealing the V2 rocket program to the Allies. When the Vichy-governed part of France was also occupied by Germany, Fourcade spent months on the run as she moved from city-to-city to avoid detection. During this time, she gave birth to her third child. The child, a son, had to be hidden at a safe-house. In July 1943, she left for London, where she worked with British intelligence, particularly via her "controller" Cmdr. Kenneth Cohen, an MI6 officer in charge of French intelligence. While she wanted to head back to France, she was forced by her control officers to stay in England until July 1944, when she eventually was allowed to return to France to join her agents in the field and managed to avoid capture.

== Post-war activities ==
Fourcade took care of 3,000 resistance agents and survivors, as well as social works and the publication of Mémorial de l'Alliance, dedicated to the resistance group's 429 dead. Despite her high profile position in the French resistance, being the leader of the longest-running spy network, Charles de Gaulle did not include her among the 1,038 people he designated resistance heroes (which included only 6 women altogether). She was not given the Order of the Liberation, though her husband Édouard Méric was.

From 1962, Fourcade chaired the Committee of Resistance Action, as well as the jury of honour of Maurice Papon in 1981. She remarried, was a mother of five children, a commander of the Légion d'honneur, vice president of the International Union of Resistance and Deportation from 1960 and the National Association of Medal-holders from 1947, and a member of the LICRA. Marie-Madeleine Fourcade was represented at the assembly of the European Communities and in 1982, chaired the Defence of Interests in France and Europe. Her last fights were for the end of the Lebanese conflict and the Klaus Barbie lawsuit in Lyon.

== Personal life and death ==
Fourcade married young, with the future colonel Édouard Méric. They had two children, but the couple became estranged and she would not visit her children for years at a time. In 1936, Fourcade met and impressed the former French military intelligence officer Major Georges Loustaunau-Lacau, code name "Navarre".

During the war, she gave birth to her third child, fathered by Leon Faye.

In 1946, she officially divorced her first husband and married Hubert Fourcade the following year. The couple had one child together in 1949.

Marie-Madeleine Fourcade died at the age of 80, on 20 July 1989, at the military hospital of Val-de-Grâce; the government and the few survivors of the resistance group paid an exceptional homage to her on 26 July at the time of her funeral in the Église Saint-Louis des Invalides, the first woman to have her funeral there, and her burial in the Cimetière du Père-Lachaise in Paris.

The Rue Marie Madeleine Fourcade in Lyon was named in her honour, as are streets in Montreuil-Juigné, Joué-lès-Tours, and Malville.

== Noah's Ark ==
Fourcade wrote a memoir of her wartime experience in the book L'Arche de Noé, published in 1968, later abridged and translated into English as Noah's Ark. She describes how, as a young woman in her early 30s, she became head of the underground intelligence network, which was to become known as "The Alliance". The name of the book is a reference to the name given to the network by the Nazis, because it assigned animal names to its members, as code names. Fourcade's was "Hedgehog". Their assignment was to gather information about German troop and naval movements and logistics inside France, and transmit this intelligence to Britain, using a network of clandestine radio transmitters and couriers. It was extremely dangerous work; many of Fourcade's closest associates being captured, tortured, and killed by the Gestapo. Some, however, were able to escape, including Fourcade herself, who escaped capture on two occasions. Arrested with her staff on 10 November 1942, she escaped through a stroke of luck, and was taken by plane to London from where she continued to direct the network. After returning to France to direct the network on the ground, she was captured a second time. Her second escape was more harrowing: in the small hours of the morning, she stripped naked and was able to force her petite body between the bars of the cell window. At the conclusion of the war, she was decorated for her outstanding service.

The Preface to the much-abridged, and poorly-translated, British/US edition was written by Kenneth Cohen who was her wartime (and post-war) "controller" in SIS and the father to her godson.

== Bibliography ==
- Lynne Olson (2019). Madame Fourcade's Secret War: The Daring Young Woman Who Led France's Largest Spy Network Against Hitler, Random House, ISBN 978-0812994766.
- Marie-Madeleine Fourcade (1968). L'Arche de Noé Fayard, ISBN 978-2259186773
- Marie-Madeleine Fourcade O.B.E., (1974). Noah's Ark. George Allen & Unwin, London,ISBN 978-0049230606
- Michèle Cointet (2006). Marie-Madeleine Fourcade, un chef de la Résistance. Perrin ISBN 978-2262023652
- Ignatius, David (December 28, 1998). "After five decades, a spy tells her tale". Washington Post. cited in Olson, p. 246
- "Marie-Madeleine Fourcade, French Resistance Leader, Dies at 79". Associated Press. July 20, 1989.
- Daniels, Katie (April 25, 2019). "Fighting the Secret War". The American Scholar.
- Blakemore, Erin (August 2019). "Madame Fourcade Was One of World War II's Most Daring Female Spies". Historynet. Archived from the original on May 30, 2019.
- Le réseau Alliance en centre-ouest
