= Intelligence gathering network =

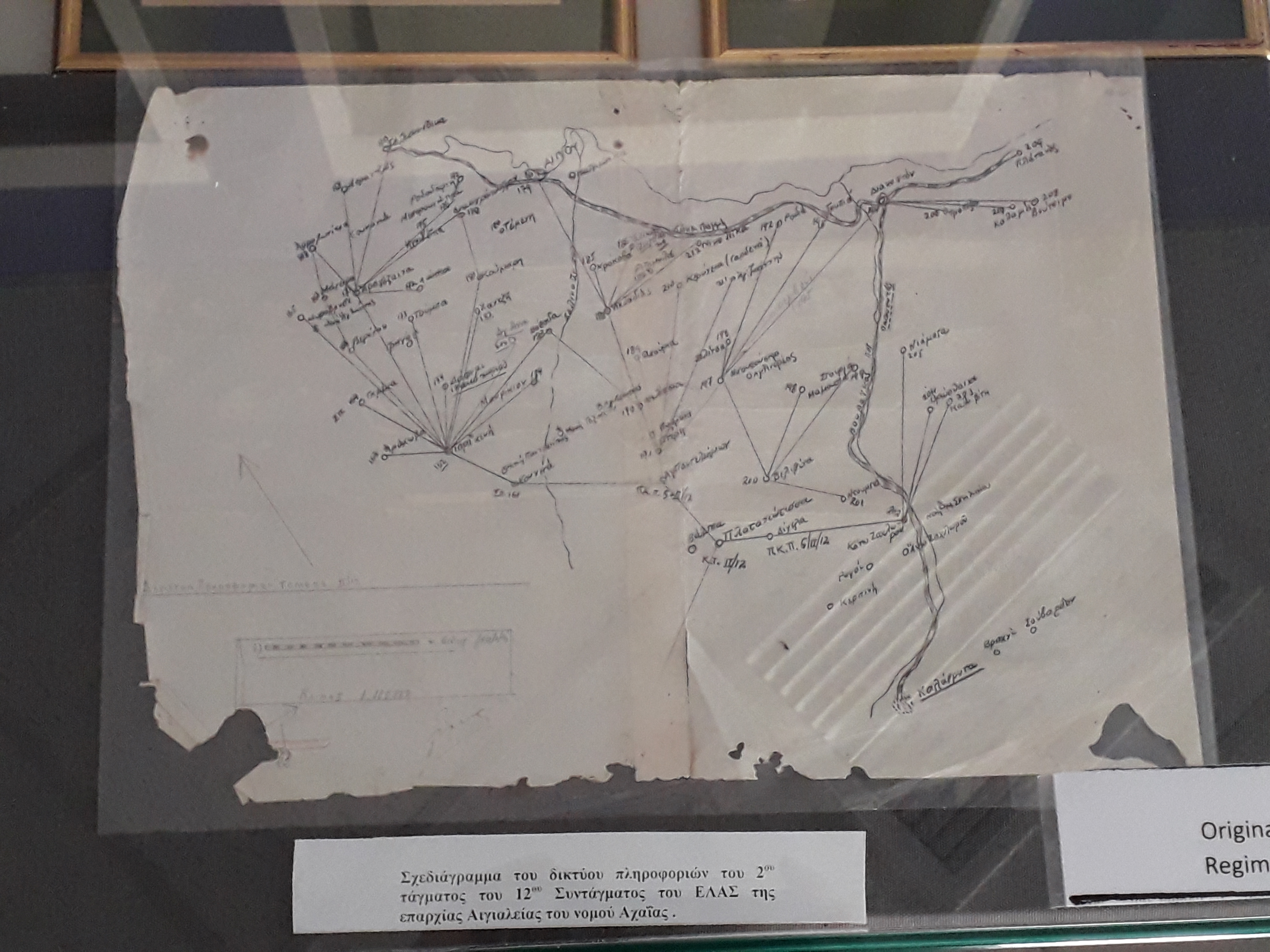
ELAS intelligence network in Aigialeia during World War II.

An intelligence gathering network is a system through which information about a particular entity is collected for the benefit of another through the use of more than one, inter-related source. Such information may be gathered by a military intelligence, government intelligence, or commercial intelligence network.

Intelligence assessment employs intelligence analysis to refine information. Foreign embassies subscribe to the newspapers and keep tabs on the news channels of their host countries — the information does not have to be classified to be considered useful intelligence; indeed, so-called OSINT, or open-source intelligence, is increasing in both quantity and utility with the ascendancy of digital media. Researchers may also be employed to dig through archives and check facts. An important form of intelligence is so-called "signals intelligence", which attempts to intercept electronic communications and other signals sent between parties working for a hostile, or potentially hostile, entity, or between neutral or even friendly parties but discussing that entity.

In established intelligence agencies, such networks usually follow a linear rather than distributed structure. An agent handler directs the activities of a number of persons and sources in order to obtain the necessary facts about the target of the intelligence gathering operation. The two main HUMINT agent types used are infiltration and penetration agents. An infiltration agent is someone who enters the target of the operation from the outside, but on a suitable pretext so that they are not suspected of espionage. A penetration agent would already be in place in the target area, and is recruited by the handler, often by means of the MICE principle. The information so gathered is processed by one or more analysts and turned into an intelligence product. Information is conveyed between nodes of the network by a variety of secure/clandestine means, be they physical or electronic.

== History ==
=== Turkey ===
At the turn of the 20th century, the last Sultan, Abdul Hamid II, demanded daily intelligence reports called djournals (from the word "journal). After decades, he had saved millions of them in "a whole building to itself in the War Office, where a Government Commission is now," Francis McCullagh wrote in 1910, "wading slowly through this amazing accumulation."
