= OSS/London =

OSS HQ in London during WW2

OSS/London
- Part of Little America; United States
- 14, 24, 28, 51, 59, 70, and 72 Grosvenor Street, 14 Mount Row, 68 and 70 Brook Street, 48, 49, and 50 Portman Square, 49 and 50 Mount Street, 7 Ryder Street, London; United Kingdom
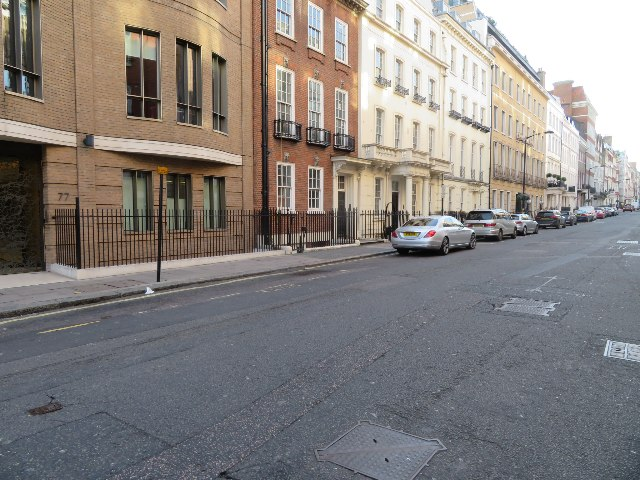
- Area of Grosvenor Street as it looks in 2016

Site information
- Type: Headquarters
- Owner: Office of the Coordinator of Information; Office of Strategic Services
- Operator: Special Operations Branch; Secret Intelligence Branch; Field Photographic Branch; Research and Analysis Branch; Maritime Unit; Operational Group Command

Location
- Coordinates: 51.511711409544965°N 0.1457877379902936°W

Site history
- In use: 1941-1945
- Battles/wars: World War II; Operation Overlord; Operation Jedburgh; Operation Sussex; PROUST; FAUST

Garrison information
- Past commanders: William Dwight Whitney; Fisher Howe; William Phillips; David K. E. Bruce
- Occupants: Isaiah Sol Dorfman; Whitney Shepardson; William J. Casey; James R. Murphy; Virginia Hall; Allan Evans; Arthur M. Schlesinger Jr.

OSS/London, originally known as COI/London or the London Outpost, was the largest foreign headquarters complex of the Office of Strategic Services (OSS) during World War II, operating out of several buildings in the area near Grosvenor Square, Mayfair, London, which maintained the command and control over all OSS servicemembers stationed in the United Kingdom and agents deployed to Western Europe, and for the bulk of the war, operated as the headquarters of OSS/Europe. From OSS/London, operations were planned alongside the British Secret Intelligence Service (MI6) and the Special Operations Executive (SOE) to deploy officers and agents throughout Europe for missions of sabotage, clandestine operations, covert operations, espionage, and other mission sets.

OSS/London began with a single staffer from the Office of the Coordinator of Information (COI) assigned as a Liaison officer to the British government working down the road at the Macdonald House. The first three specific offices for OSS/London were located at 59, 71, and 72 Grosvenor Street, but by the end of the war it had expanded to Mount Row, Brook Street, Portman Square, and Mount Street. The facilities management and procurement were undertaken by OSS/London's transportation section. For some time, the X2 Counterintelligence Section was based out of 7 Ryder Street (which has become 14 Ryder Street). At its peak staffing in 1944, there were 2,800 OSS personnel working under the command structure of OSS/London.

== History ==
=== Origins ===
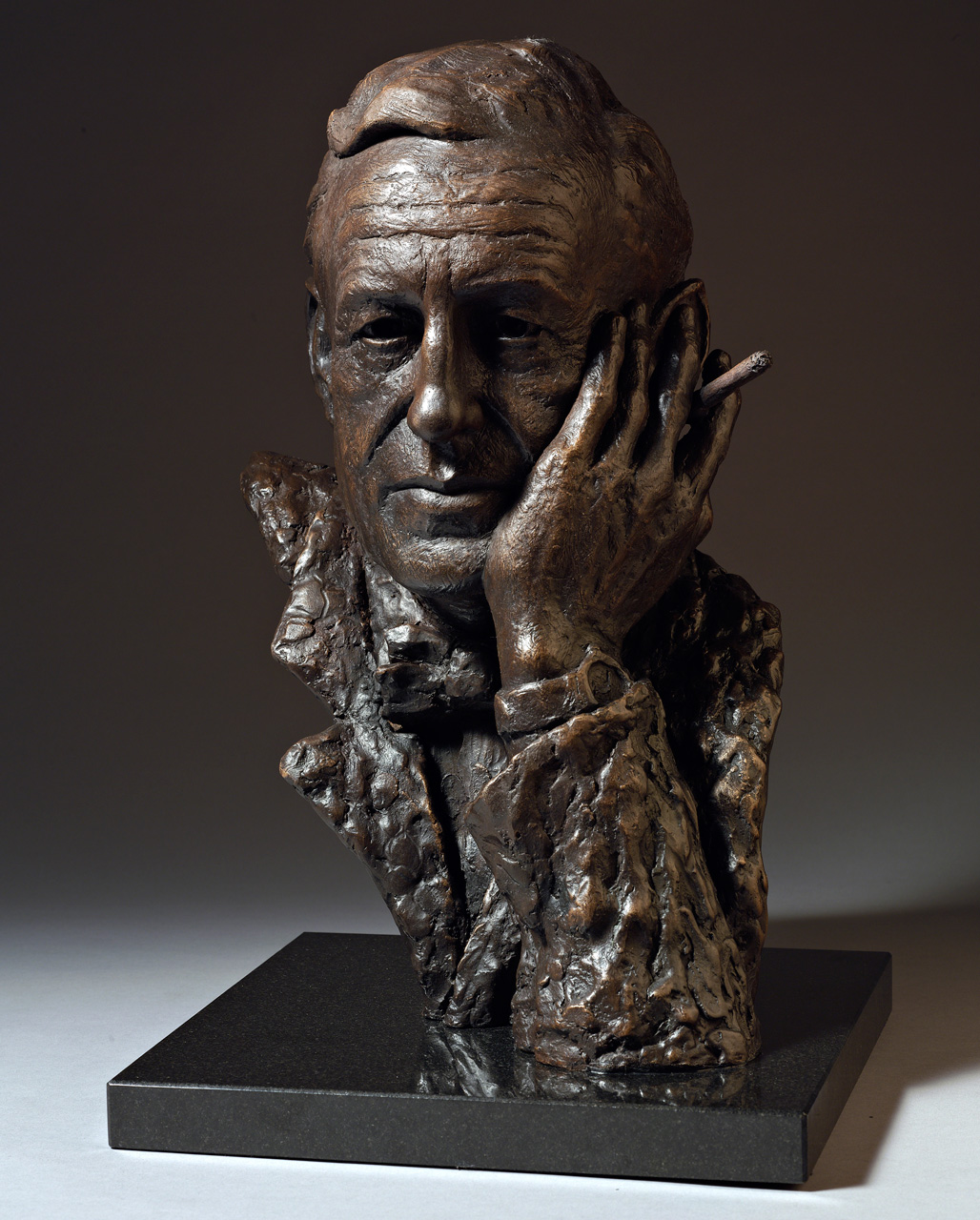
Ian Fleming (later the author of James Bond) was one of several Brits instrumental in drafting the blueprint for the Office of the Coordinator of Information (COI).

Throughout 1939 and 1940, President Franklin Roosevelt and Winston Churchill were in constant communications, where Churchill tried to convince Roosevelt to contribute militarily to the war. Roosevelt could not do this without an Act of Congress. However, in June 1940, he did deploy William J. "Wild Bill" Donovan – the man that he called his "secret legs" – to London on a fact-finding mission to gauge British strength, and to discover any information regarding fifth columns. While Donovan was in England, he formed relationships with Stewart Menzies, King George V, John Henry Godfrey and Ian Fleming. Upon his return to the United States, Donovan presented his findings to Roosevelt that they were in desperate need of a new style of civilian intelligence agency, to be modeled after the British system.

In July 1941, Roosevelt appointed Donovan as the head of the Office of the Coordinator of Information (COI). After the British officers Dick Ellis, John Godfrey, and Ian Flemming contributed to the blueprint for the agency, corralled initially by William "Little Bill" Stephenson at the British Security Co-ordination (BSC), the first batches of COI-trained operators were sent to Camp X, which was operated by the Special Operations Executive (SOE), whose first commandant was Richard Melville Brooker.

=== COI/London ===
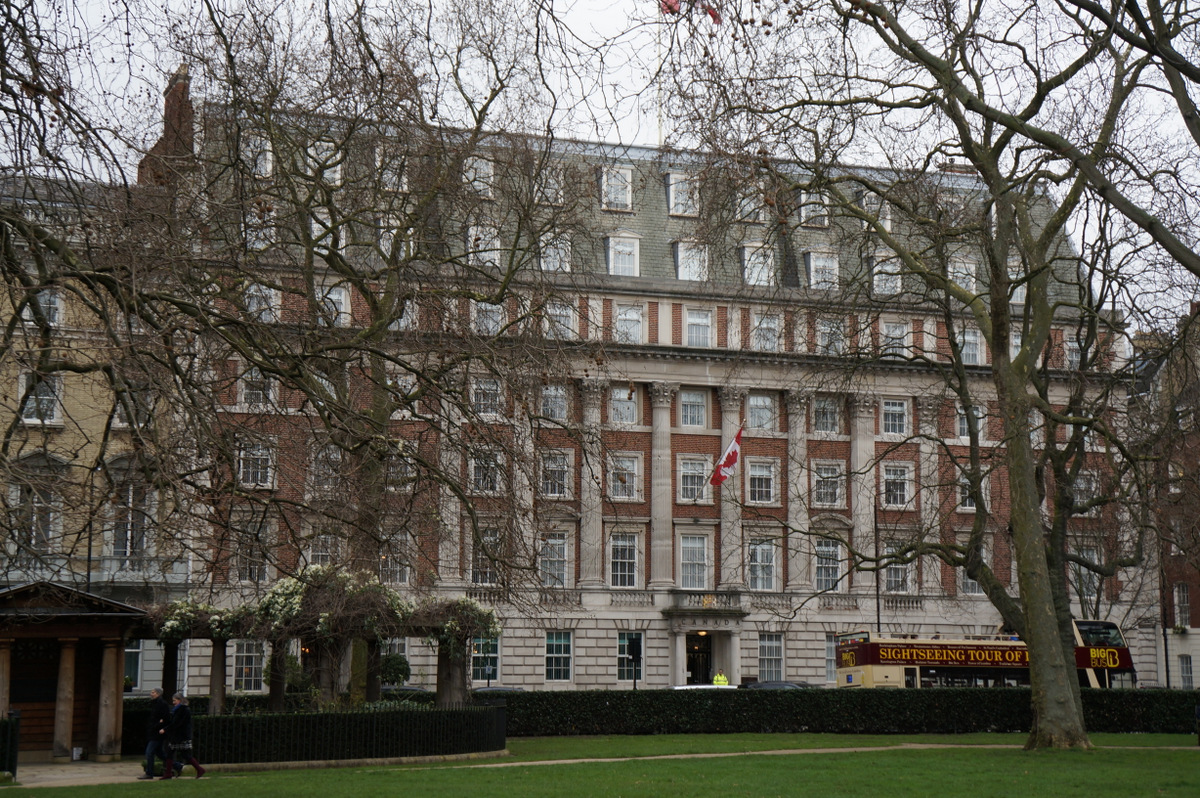
Macdonald House, today the location of the High Commission of Canada, was at the time the Embassy of the United States in London.

At the end of 1941, Donovan and the COI established the London Outpost at the Embassy of the United States, which was at that time located at Macdonald House in Mayfair, London. The two primary representatives at the Embassy mission for OSS became William Dwight Whitney and Fisher Howe, both of whom had already been stationed at the Embassy on other matters for Donovan.

The Office of the Coordinator of Information (COI) was the first non-departmental civilian intelligence agency in the United States.

Whitney became the first Director of the London Outpost, and toured the country with Robert Sherwood, director of the Foreign Information Service (FIS) at the time, inspecting military installations and other relevant special and secret installations belonging to the SOE, SIS, the Political Warfare Executive (PWE), and the Ministry of Economic Warfare(MEW). The day after the Attack on Pearl Harbor, Whitney's first small team of staff arrived at the Outpost – the attack in Hawaii had occurred while the team was in-route. Quickly, they established COI liaison officers with their counterparts in the British military and intelligence, as well as the other relevant American offices in Grosvenor Square. The SOE and PWE were enthusiastic, but the SIS took a few weeks to develop rapport because the original COI liaisons intended for the relationship with SIS – R.M.J. Fellner and William Phillips – were less than preferable. Fisher Howe, in the journal of the OSS Society, notes that there were two people named "William Phillips" involved in COI, and that they are often confused with one-another.

After the United States entered into the war, Whitney was overly forthcoming in communications to his British counterparts about the internal political landscape in Washington. One of his most damaging reports came in the form of a memo entitled "The Crisis in COI," detailing the political machinations trying to assail Donovan at the time. This memo created a British mistrust in the COI, especially in the political allies to the military.

Over the course of the next several months, another political conflict back home arose between Robert Sherwood and Bill Donovan over the nature of the Foreign Information Service. Sherwood wrote a letter to the President stating his desire for the propaganda service to be separated out from the COI, but also included in the letter that Donovan desired this as well – Donovan didn't, Sherwood was lying, but nonetheless Roosevelt began making these arrangements.

William Dwight Whitney resigned from his post two weeks later. His replacement became William Phillips, the renknowned American diplomat.

=== OSS/London ===
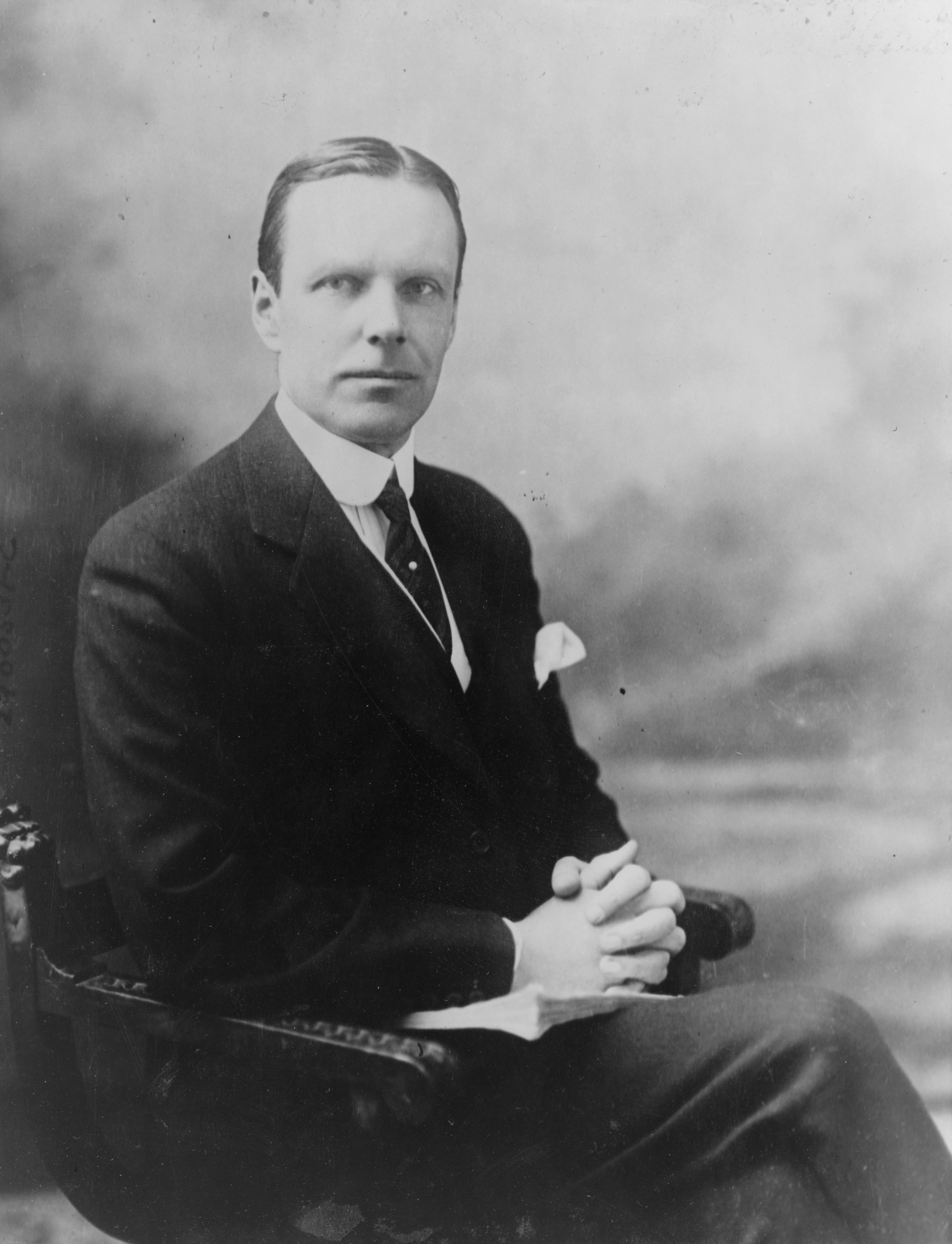
William Phillips was made Chief of COI/London when William Whitney resigned from his post. He saw the outpost through its transition and re-badge to OSS/London. *There were two employees at COI/London named William Phillips. Chief Phillips was mostly liked by his staff, where LNO Phillips was universally disliked.*

On June 13, 1942, President Roosevelt issued an executive order to create a new organization called the Office of Strategic Services (OSS). To stay relevant as an operator in the war, Donovan accepted the dissolution of the COI, but in exchange, he urged the establishment of OSS under the structure of the US military's Joint Chiefs of Staff. This came with the commission into the rank of Brigadier General (BG). With the OSS coming under the command structure of the Joint Chiefs, the leadership felt less threatened by the civilian nature of the military organization, but Donovan still maintained enmities among the military ranks.

As Charles Pinck (former director of the OSS Society), writes: "Donovan fought entrenched Washington interests that were threatened by his revolutionary intelligence organization. Donovan said he had more enemies in Washington than Hitler had in Europe."

However, another arrival in June 1942 to London was Dwight D. Eisenhower, who quickly established himself at the Supreme Headquarters Allied Expeditionary Force (SHAEF), which was also based out of Grosvenor Square. Eisenhower himself took up residence in the neighborhood, as well. The close proximity of all of these American offices, both military and civilian, allowed effective in-person communication between the entire American mission to London. The mass influx of Americans to the neighborhood caused reporters from The Guardian to refer to the neighborhood of Grosvenor Square as "Little America" or "Eisenhower Platz."

While the North African campaign was underway, the staff of OSS/London steadily grew over that summer, and especially in the leadup to Operation Torch. The primary focus of OSS/London was the territory of Free France/Vichy France and the colonial possession of French West Africa.

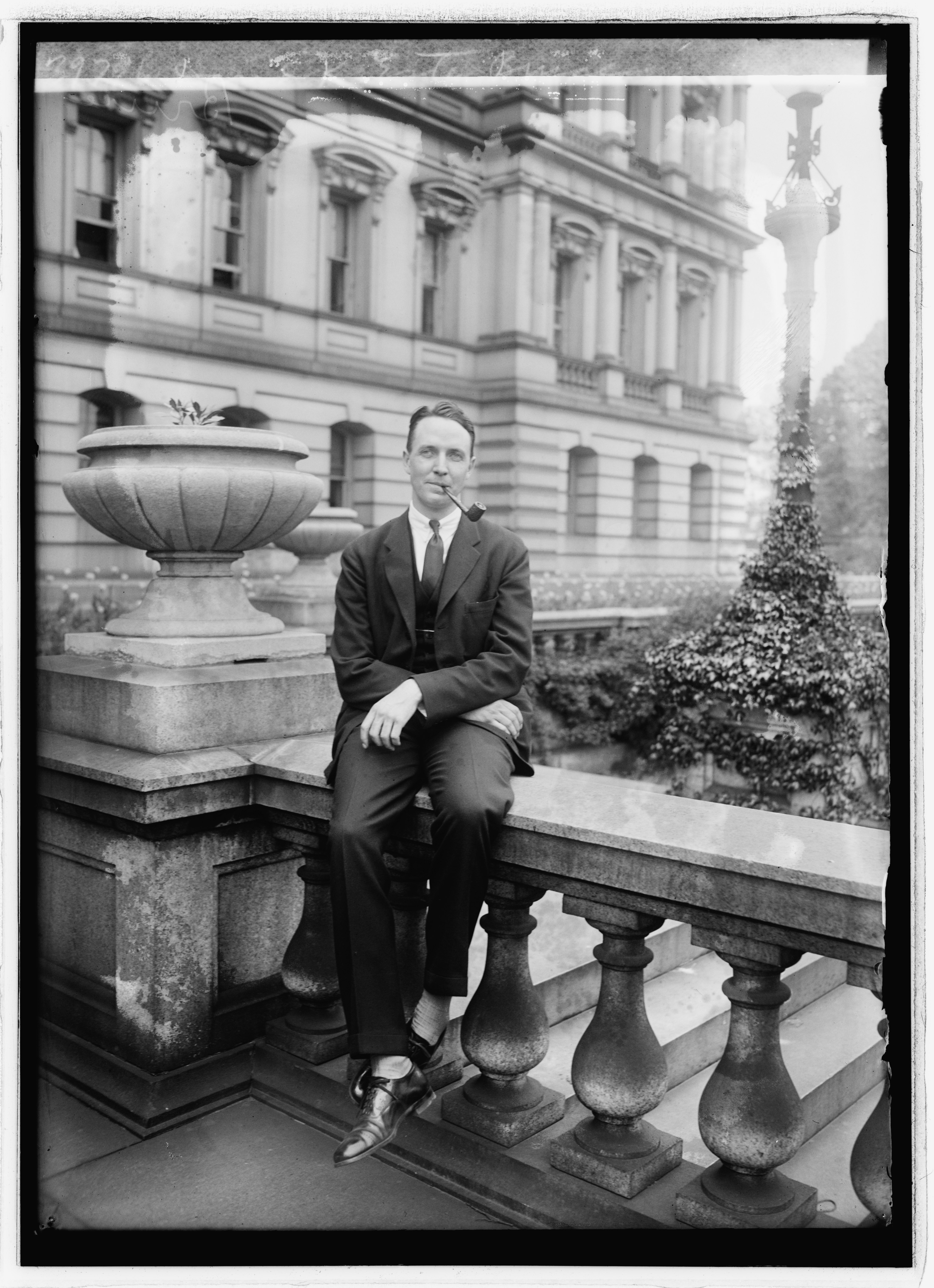
David K. E. Bruce, a career diplomat, as Chief of OSS/London smoothed-over the political infighting between OSS and the US military in London and saw the station grow to its zenith of over two thousand staff.

In December 1942, David K. E. Bruce replaced William Phillips as the Chief of Station. Phillips, meanwhile, was personally sent by the President to an Ambassadorial post in India during WWII.

Theater Commanders thought that OSS/London should function as an extension of the G-2 in London. This perspective was shared by both General Frank Maxwell Andrews, who was killed in a plane crash in May 1943, and his successor, General Jacob L. Devers.

The growing pains of development were solved under the leadership of David Bruce, who managed to disperse and place new staffs relatively evenly between the branches of OSS/London. As more staffers arrived from the United States, the OSS managed to expand their reach into Europe, acting as a vital relief to the beleaguered Resistance organizations in occupied territories. Each of the branches, especially SI/London and SO/London, grew from core groups of individuals into large underground enterprises. By the end of 1943, large numbers of staff were in place at OSS/London, and regular operations were deployed to France.

However, many of the newly arrived military generals and OSS leadership had been somewhat indoctrinated into a mythos that had grown around the British intelligence apparatus, and were hesitant to allow OSS to undermine the success of SOE and MI6. General Devers was particularly susceptible to the British myth, causing David Bruce to include the General's apprehension about allowing OSS to expand here in memos bak to Washington. This mythos pervaded pockets of OSS/London for the rest of the war.

Successively after Algiers, Casablanca, and Cairo were liberated by the Allies, OSS/London was involved in deploying members to staff large field bases there. However, those bases were not nearly as large as OSS/London. This provided for a coordinated effort leading up to the Allied invasion of Sicily. While there was coordination between OSS/Europe and OSS/MEDTO, OSS/London had no operational control over MEDTO (Mediterranean Theatre of Operations).

By 1944, shortly before D Day, there were 2800 people working at OSS/London. At this time of hectic activity, Bruce and Donovan established the OSS/London Secretariat, which facilitated Bruce in managing the complex and its staff.

Shortly after D Day, while maintaining command over OSS/Europe, David Bruce advanced forward onto the continent and worked mostly out of offices there, rarely returning to London. Much of the staff of OSS/London, after the success of Operation Cobra and the establishment of a beachhead in Normandy, then relocated onto the continent to be closer to the front line, reducing the overall staff at OSS/London through 1944.

The OSS was formally dissolved by Executive Order 9620 on 20 September 1945, leaving the facilities at Grosvenor Street to eventually become residential complexes.

== Activities ==
OSS had been designed as a centralized intelligence agency with all aspects of intelligence under its purview, but the British system which emerged was by 1942 no longer structured under a centralized organizational hierarchy. As such, each of the branches of OSS stationed here formed semi-autonomous operational capabilities. To some onlookers, this seemed like it might have hindered their abilities, but this was not an opinion shared by most OSS/London branch chiefs. Each of these branches also formed separate liaison offices with their British counterparts. In many cases, the relationships formed between these OSS branches and their British counterparts were stronger than they were with each other. David Bruce, as a result, had to constantly mediate arguments between SIS and SOE in order so that the American effort might be perceived as unified back home, instead of siloed as it was. Another complication was that while their British counterparts would share information with SO/London and SI/London, they would not share information with SO/Washington or SI/Washington.

Both SO/London and SI/London created detachments that operated in the field alongside military commanders, in order to receive and coordinate appropriate mission sets for their clandestine and covert operatives in the field.

=== SO/London and SO/SOE ===
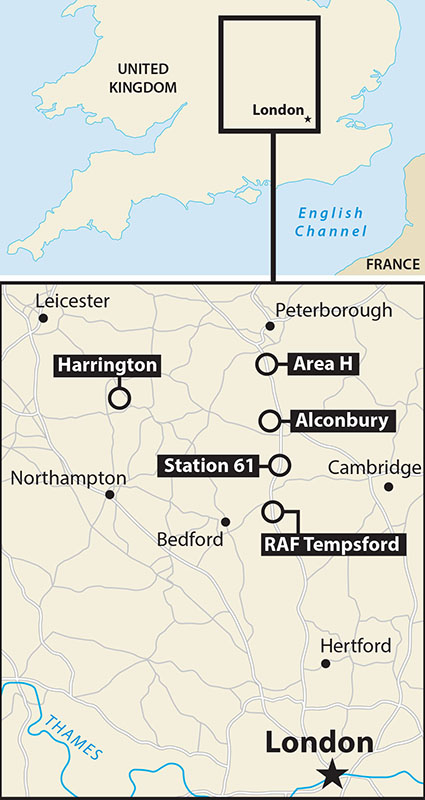
"Area H" was a supply depot operated by SO/London. It served as a supply line for dozens of SO/SOE operations launched from nearby facilities.

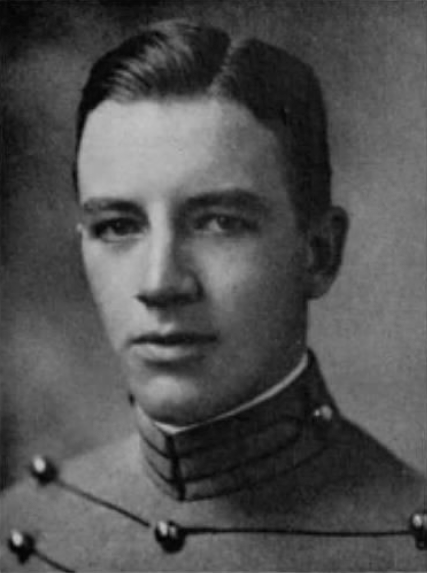
Joseph Farrell Haskell (pictured here in 1930), took over from Charles Vanderblue as Chief of SO/London in 1943. However, once the beachhead was established at Normandy, he accompanied David Bruce to France. Temporarily, he became the Commander of an Armored Company for the Army, and earned the Silver Star for courage under fire.

The Special Operations Branch (SO) at OSS/London, known as SO/London, was responsible for sabotage, the supply and support of resistance organizations, and the conduct of guerrilla warfare in enemy-occupied areas. Its British counterpart was the London Group of the Special Operations Executive (SOE).

The Chief of SO/London was Charles Vanderblue. The Executive Officer of SO/London was George E. Brewer, who was also responsible for all of the remote installations away from OSS/London. Brewer would also become the Acting Chief whenever Vanderblue was deployed on-mission.

Only 10 days after the creation of OSS, on June 13, 1942, SO/London and the SOE signed the "SO/SOE agreement." Joint operations from then on were often referred to as being under the command of SO/SOE Headquarters. Under this agreement, any SO/London operations that were planned and controlled in London were in the beginning, placed under the command of SOE. This agreement also ensured that SO/SOE would not operate without permission in areas of the "invasion sphere" of military command and control.

When a joint Anglo-American invasion staff was established down the street at COSSAC under the command of Frederick Morgan and Ray Barker, SO/SOE was further delineated under British command. To coordinate activities and perform after-action reviews, representatives would meet at Norgeby House, across the street from 64 Baker Street.

By 1943, the bulk of SO/Washington had moved their offices to London, leaving only a small crew back home.

Especially vital to this mission were the logistics and supply chain, as well as the transport sections, which were all placed under the command of the Special Operations Branch (SO). To coordinate the necessary supplies needed for covert and clandestine operators deployed on the continent, OSS/London established supply depots in the area between London and Peterborough. The main supply point was Area H at Holmeswood. Among the supplies dispersed at Area H; parachutes, Willys Jeeps, and other vital supplies.

SO/London oversaw the radio communication operations at Station Charles in Poundon (not Hurley).

The French Resistance operatives controlled by SO/London were commanded by an American of Belgian birth named William Grell.

On October 18, 1943, Colonel Charles S. Vanderblue was replaced by Joseph Haskell as Chief of SO/London.

==== Operation Jedburgh ====
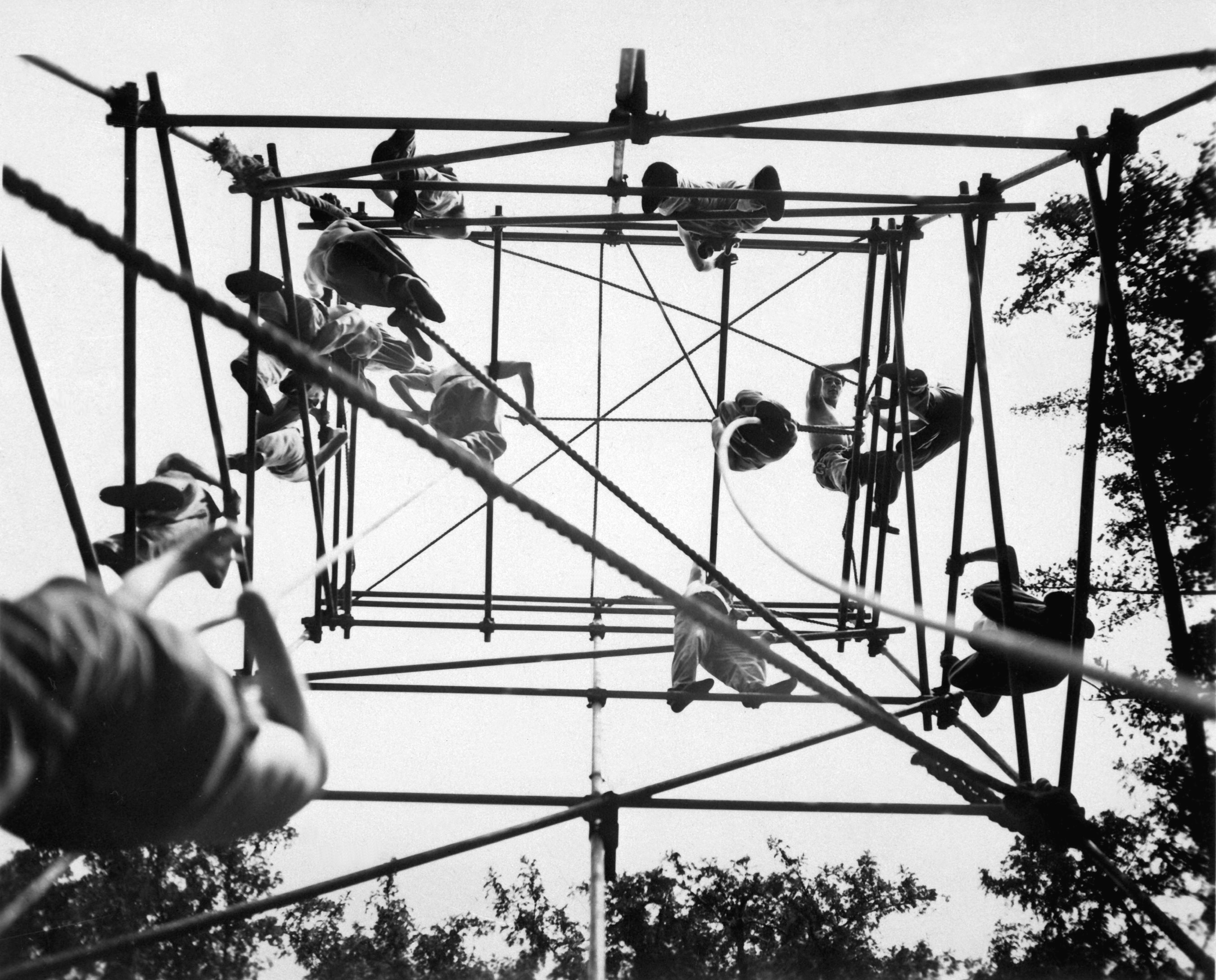
Jedburghs on high bars in obstacle course in Milton Hall

Early in the planning stages for Jedburgh, SO/London assigned liaison officers to be attached with field army staffs. These attached officers moved with the army to coordinate with resistance movements on the ground, and request for assistance from these groups to prepare for Allied movements across the battle space. They also kept Allied commanders apprised of whatever local underground organizations might be of use to the military.

On 10 January 1944, the SO/London and the London Group were merged into Special Forces Headquarters (SFHQ), also known as Jedburgh Command, under which they continued their activities.

Between January and September 1944, a total of 93 JEDBURGH teams, each composed of one SOE member, one SO/London officer, and one officer native to the country of operations, were parachuted into occupied Western Europe to assist resistance movements and coordinate clandestine operations.

=== SI/London ===
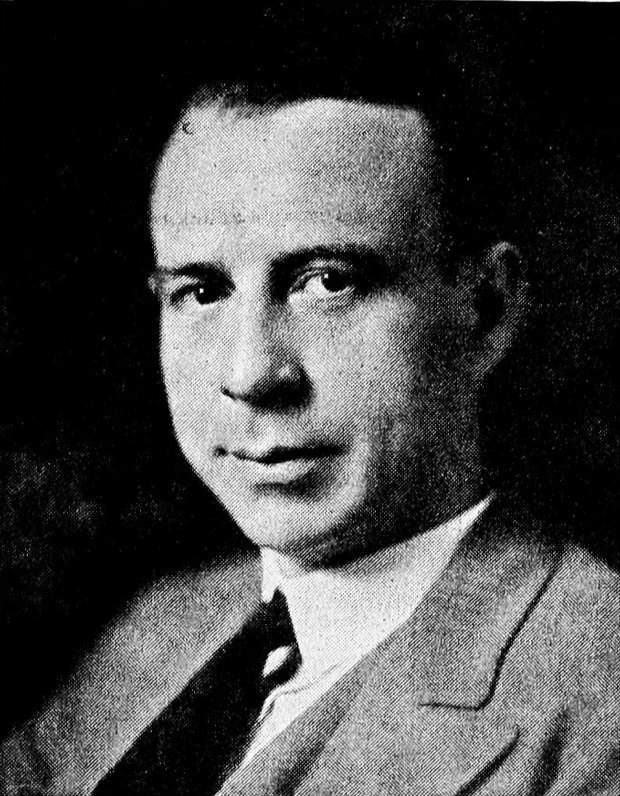
Whitney Shepardson was Chief of SI/London until 1943.

The Secret Intelligence Branch (SI) at OSS/London, known as SI/London, was tasked with the collection and analysis of strategic secret intelligence in support of the Joint Chiefs of Staff (JCS). SI/London was established in September 1942. The British counterpart to SI/London was the Secret Intelligence Service (SIS), today more commonly known as MI6. Getting SI/London off the ground was more difficult initially, because of the existing hesitance of General Devers to authorize joint activities. However, soon after a meeting between Donovan and Stewart Menzies, Claude Dansey was relieved of his command as Deputy Director of SIS and replaced by James Marshall-Cornwall, who was more amenable to the Americans.

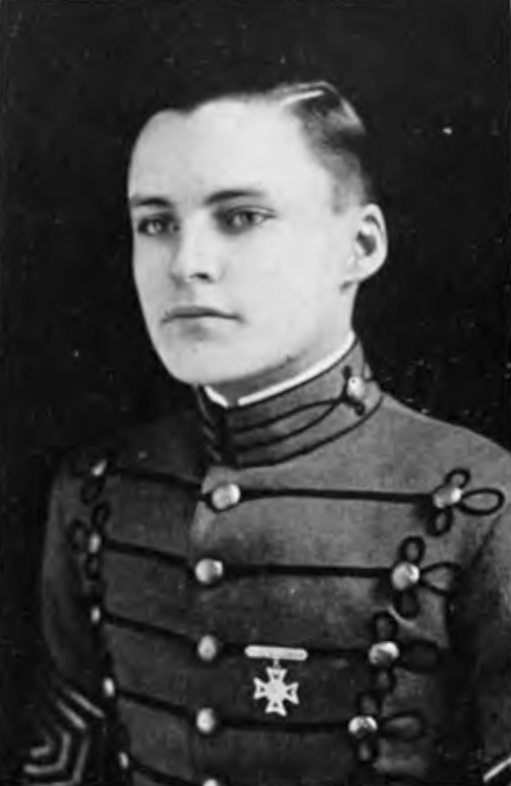
Bill Maddox (pictured here in 1921) took over as Chief of SI/London in 1943.

After inquiries by the JCS as to the utility of OSS in secret intelligence operations in Europe, Menzies ensured that SI/London would be authorized full funding and support by the American military establishment. However, he also ensured that many operations would be under the control of SIS. As a result of this British oversight early in the war, some of the staff of SI/London felt that SIS was hindering its development as a functional organization. SIS was initially hesitant share intelligence, and especially their prized training program, with SI/London because they were afraid that the OSS would not last the duration of the war – primarily due to the restrictions placed on OSS/London by the US military – and did not want to waste resources. However, as SI/London proved its staying-power as an organization, by August 28, 1943, the relationship was improved and operations were planned successfully.

When OSS was established in 1942, the two SI/London Liaison Officers to SIS were Whitney Shepardson and William P. Maddox, with Shepardson being Chief of SI/London until Spring 1943. When David Bruce was made Chief of OSS/London, Shepardson was sent back to Washington and promoted to become Chief of the entire Secret Intelligence Branch, a position he held for the rest of the war. Bill Maddox took over for Shepardson as Chief of SI/London, and saw the office through its largest and most successful operations on the continent. Maddox would later be made Chief of SI/MEDTO in Rome.

SI/London oversaw the radio communication activities of Station Victor in Hurley, Berkshire (not Poundon).

==== Operations SUSSEX and PROUST ====
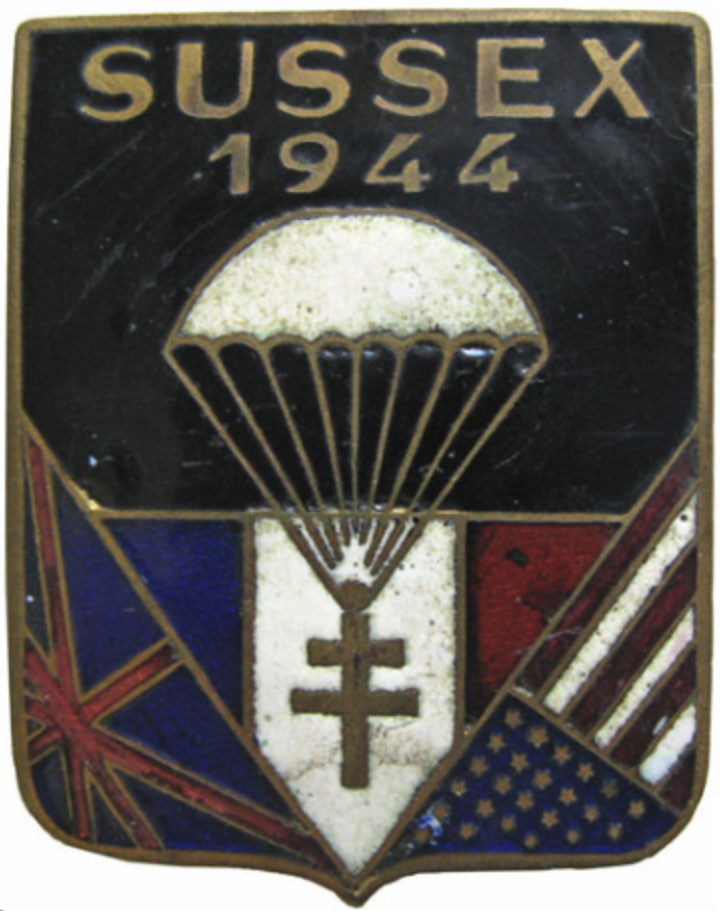
Operation SUSSEX was a tripartite operation between SI/London, SIS, and the BCRA.

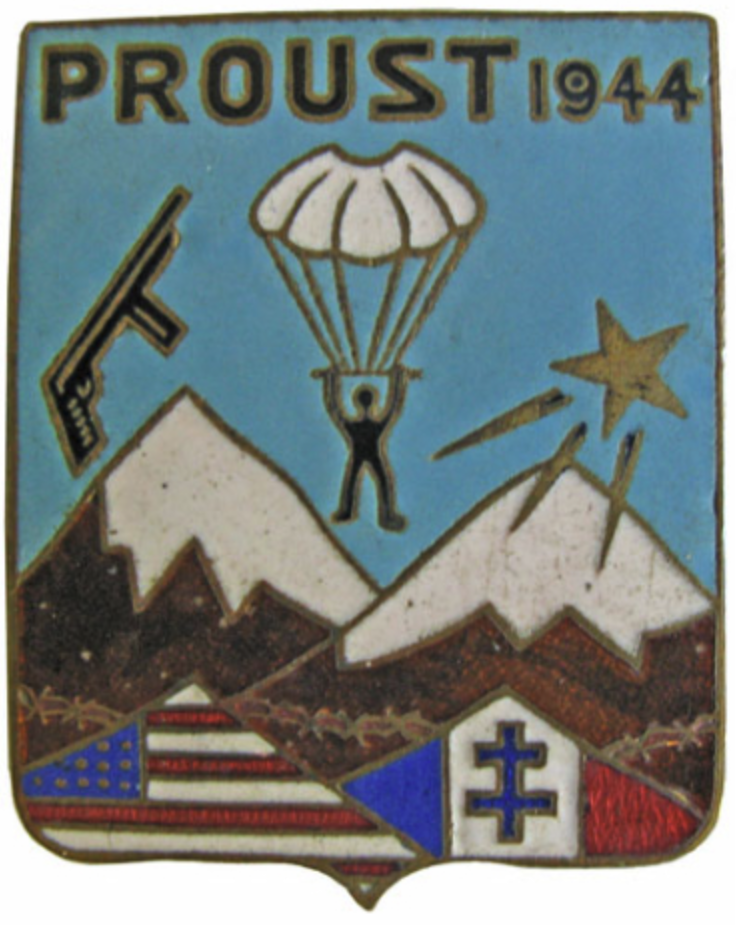
Operation PROUST was a plan by SI/London and BCRA in the event that SUSSEX failed, or needed additional support.

These badges were given to the surviving agents after the conclusion of the missions and the liberation of France.

The single-largest joint operation undertaken by SI/London and SIS was Operation SUSSEX, also known as the Sussex Plan. Planning for Sussex on the American side began in April, 1943, initially suggested by Stacy Lloyd. The operation was officially given a planning committee on January 4, 1944. This Tripartite Planning Committee, also called the SUSSEX Committee, or the Tripartite Control Committee, was staffed by Kenneth Cohen from SIS as chair of the committee, Francis Pickens Miller from SI/London, and Gilbert "Rémy" Renault from the Bureau central de renseignements et d'action (BCRA). Nearly three-quarters of the staff of SI/London were involved in SUSSEX.

SI/London, instead of creating individual liaison officers to serve with field commanders like SO/London had done, created SI Field Detachment units, whose purpose was similar.

Despite the fact that SUSSEX was designed as an advanced party operation, there were in fact an advanced parties to the advanced parties, called the Pathfinder missions. Prior to the deployment of any SUSSEX operatives, Pathfinder teams were deployed into the theatre to scout-out terrain, geography, and avenues of approach for potential landing zones.

Operation SUSSEX involved the recruitment of 96 agents recruited from the Free French Army. Half of that number became OSSEX agents, dropped in two-man teams by parachute into American objective areas. The other half became BRISSEX agents, dropped into British and Canadian objective areas. On D Day, there were already seven BRISSEX and seven OSSEX teams deployed behind enemy lines reporting on enemy movements. Overall, between February and September 1944, two Pathfinder teams and 52 SUSSEX teams were parachuted into Axis-occupied territories.

In the event of anything going wrong with the SUSSEX Plan, there was devised another operation called Operation PROUST, or the PROUST Plan. Unlike SUSSEX, PROUST was an operation only under the control of SI/London and the BCRA.

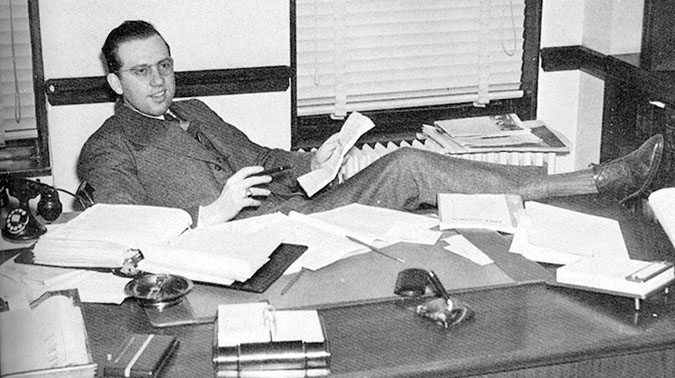
William J. Casey was made chief of SI/London in June 1944, and saw it through the Allied push into Germany.

==== FAUST Plan ====
In June 1944, William J. Casey was brought from Washington to become the chief of SI/London, replacing Bill Maddox, and with the consent of SHAEF, was given full responsibility to organize the penetration of Nazi Germany by a wide swathe of agents.

Casey's appointment came at a time of great frustration at SHAEF – SHAEF extremely lacked in information and penetration into Germany, and sent deliberate requests for information (RFIs) to Casey, stating that: "any information regarding location, strength and movement of troops and supplies, together with the state of morale [inside Germany] was of interest."

SI/London created the FAUST Plan, which was written to be a penetration campaign into Nazi Germany using 30 secret agents, cultivated from dissident anti-Nazi groups living in England and Sweden, who would be dropped into the continent to establish intelligence networks and spy rings to collect secret intelligence there. Ultimately, the FAUST Plan was a roadmap for over 50 missions sent into Germany in the final months of the war.

===== TOOL missions =====
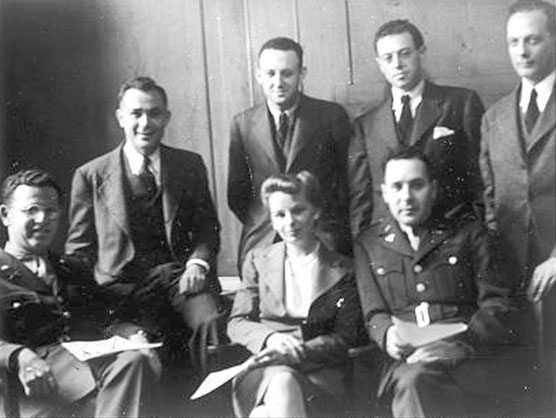
The London Labor Division in July 1944. On the far left is Arthur Goldberg.

Five of the missions under the FAUST Plan came to be known as the TOOL missions, or the TOOL series, commanded by Joseph Gould. They were called the TOOL series because each of the missions was named after a type of tool; HAMMER, CHISEL, PICKAXE, MALLET and BUZZSAW. The major component of SI/London involved in the planning and operations of TOOL was the SI Labor Division, (sometimes called the Labor Desk), whose Chief was Arthur Goldberg.

The Labor Division was created by Goldberg when he arrived in London in 1943 and realized that Nazi Germany had dissolved labor unions both in Germany and elsewhere. These labor unions and trade groups were already organized behind enemy lines, unified, and opposed to the Nazi Party. The Labor Division was created to take advantage of these networks.

In September 1944, the Labor Division discovered that there were anti-Nazi political exiles living in Hampstead who members of the Free Germany Movement of Great Britain, with direct ties to the Free-Germany Movement. They assigned Gould to make contact with the group. Before the war in the United States, Gould had led picket lines and walkouts to negotiate better conditions and pay for workers. Gould made contact with the group in a local bookstore, recruited a full staff of former union workers to lead the mission, and took the group to be trained at OSS/London Area F, today known as the Battle of Britain House in Ruislip. Parachute training for TOOL took place at Ringway Airfield.

One of the members of the mission recruited by Gould was Ursula Kuczynski, who was later revealed to be Ruth Werner, a famous Soviet spy. Werner recruited several of the Free Germans into the Free Germany Committee, and thereafter into the USSR's intelligence apparatus.

Labor Division planned and deployed many other missions, and when Paris was liberated, it also established another base there.

=== R&A/London ===
The Research and Analysis Branch (R&A) at OSS/London, known as R&A/London, staffed by some of the top leading academics in the United States, was tasked with the production of full-scope intelligence pictures of culture, economics, geography, topography, and other information through accurate and objective studies. This field branch, like all of the R&A field branches overseen by James Baxter and William Langer, operated on the primary mission set to produce documents and information that would be useful to the main R&A branch in Washington, D.C. Relationships with the US military and their British counterparts were considered secondary, or even tertiary to the main mission.

R&A/London was set-up by Allan Evans, a graduate of Harvard University, only weeks after the attacks at Pearl Harbor. When he was stationed here, he had no knowledge of the other branches, and especially had not been briefed on the existence of SO/London. He saw the early period of R&A/London as a fertile breeding ground for new ideas, or as he wrote later: "...a free-for-all pioneering and expansion."

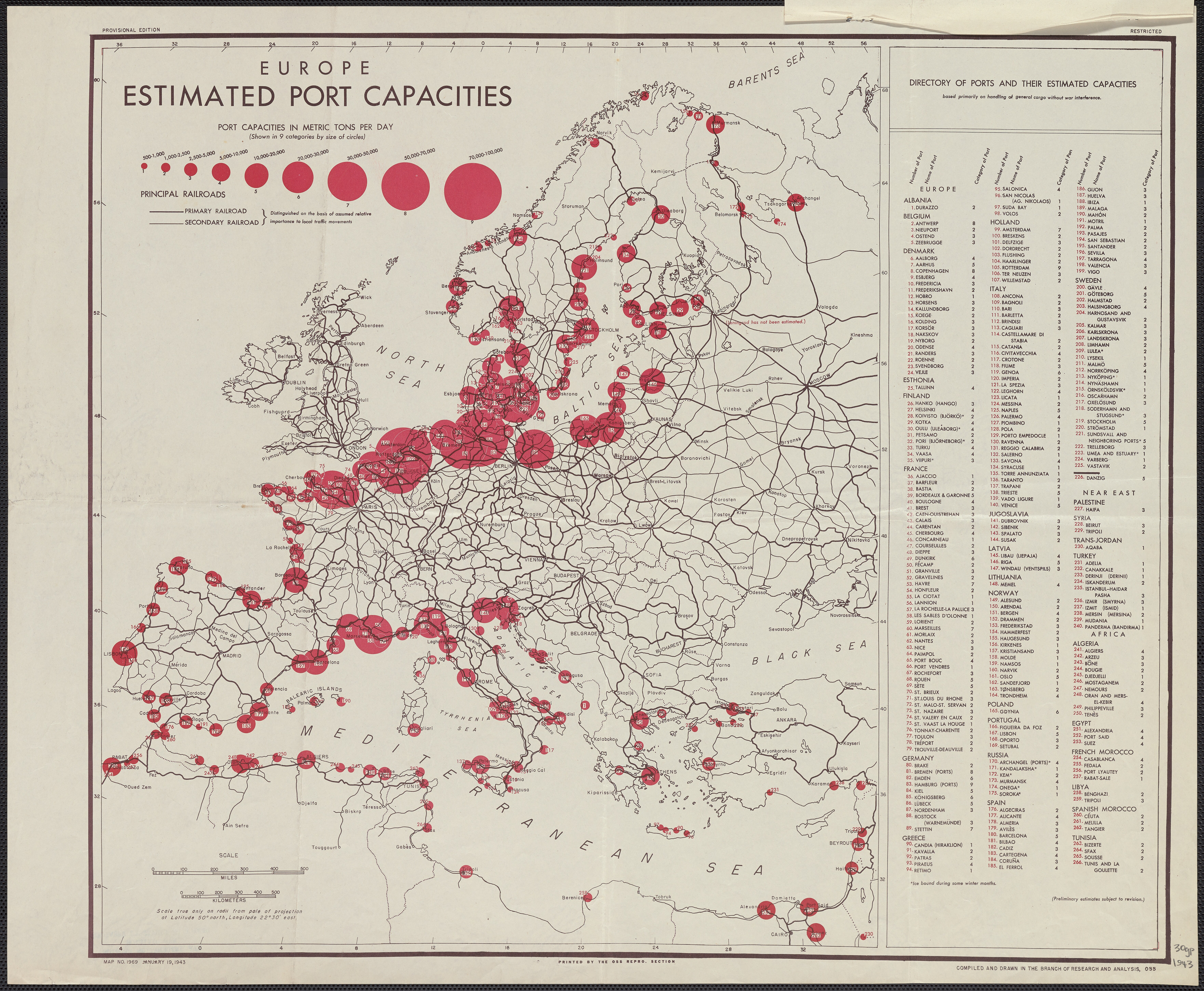
The Maps Division of R&A/London was one of the R&A divisions considered useful to military commanders.

After the academics arrived in London, they realized that they would need to establish local relationships in order to accomplish their primary mission. Especially, these were academics largely unused to communicating with military leaders about their work, and much of their products went unused. This was long before BLUF had been popularized in the US military, and, according to Nelson MacPherson, these academics often could not answer the question "So, what?" One nickname that the military had for these academics was the "Bad Eyes Brigade," due to the fact that many of them wore eyeglasses and reading glasses. Because those with PhDs insisted on others calling them "Doctor," officers in SO/London and SI/London sometimes jokingly referred to R&A as "The Medical School."

The United Kingdom had several years earlier already mobilized almost their entire intellectual class to perform similar works. These British academics were employed by the GC&CS, the British Civil Service, the British Central Register of the Ministry of Labour, the Economic Section of the War Cabinet, SIS, the Intelligence Corps, the Ministry of Economic Warfare, Research and Experiments Department 8 (RE8), the Inter-Services Topographic Department, the Foreign Office Research Department, the Political Intelligence Department, and the Political Warfare Executive. Unlike the more operational branches of OSS/London, where there could be a utility in more than one spy or guerrilla warfighter being assigned similar operations – much of the work of research and analysis often did not need duplication.

Allan Evans was replaced by Shepard Morgan as Chief of R&A/London in January 1943. Morgan attempted wherever he could to embed R&A personnel into the staffs of those British agencies where R&A/London was pulling the bulk of their information sent to Washington, but Washington still expected high quality products. R&A/London became "functionally isolated" from the rest of the branches at OSS/London, who distrusted the academics, and produced their own products within their own branches. Morgan returned home due to failing health in September, and was replaced by Crane Brinton as Acting Chief of R&A/London.

Crane Brinton was replaced as Chief of R&A/London by Chandler Morse, formerly the director of London's Enemy Objectives Unit (EOU).

As plans for Operation OVERLORD were underway in early 1944, Harold Deutsch was dispatched from Washington to more adequately harmonize R&A/London's relationships with their OSS/London counterparts, and establish firmer liaisons with their British counterparts. While he was able to effectuate an information exchange with SI/London, he could not repair its relationship with the OVERLORD planning committee, and the bulk of their operations now benefited SHAEF.

When Paris was liberated, R&A established R&A/Paris, its second overseas post, at 79 Champs-Élysées.

==== Enemy Objectives Unit ====
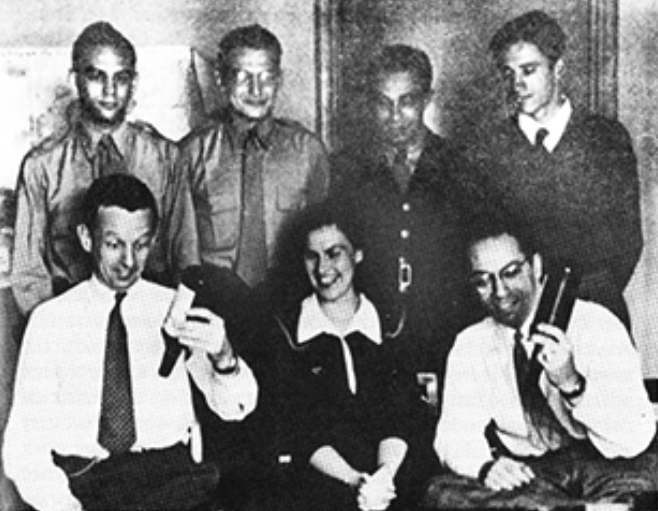
Some members of the Enemy Objectives Unit. Seated left to right: Charles Kindleberger, Roselene Honerkamp, Irwin Nat Pincus. Standing left to right: William Salant, Walt W. Rostow, Agent Selko, Edward Mayer.

The Enemy Objectives Unit was a unit of R&A/London whose duties involved making use of on-the-ground intelligence and R&A studies to identify strategic targets for the United States Army Air Forces (USAAF). EOU was a largely successful unit of R&A/London, focused on identifying targets in Germany. Their success was largely due to their ability to provide policy suggestion to commanders in addition to pure intelligence.

When Morse was made Chief of R&A/London, Morse's position at EOU was taken by Charles Kindleberger, who pioneered the notion of "Strategic Bombing." Kindleberger was in charge of the EOU from February 27, 1943 until June 19, 1944, when he was deployed to the continent to work in the 12th US Army Group, an OSS Detachment embedded in G-2 for General Edwin Sibert. Kindleberger became famous here for criticizing the British method of bombing as being "all hammer and no anvil."

=== X-2 ===
The job of the X-2 Counterintelligence Branch was to hunt Axis spies, moles, and double agents embedded into the Allied war effort, and as such, their headquarters were intentionally located away from any of the other branches of OSS, as were their field bases. Their British counterparts were Section V of the Secret Intelligence Service, also known as MI-6 (V) or X-B, and the Security Service, more commonly known as MI5. X-2 was directed by James R. Murphy for the bulk of the war, who moved X-2 Headquarters to OSS/London in 1943. In London, the staff of X-2 were involved to some extent in the Double-Cross System. X-2 was also the primary American organization to interpret and pursue agents mentioned in ULTRA intercepts.

The agreements between SIS and X-2 were reached in December 1942, according to the British Official History; "for full cooperation on counter- espionage between Section V and...X-2, in London and at overseas stations. Representatives of X-2 joined Section V in March 1943 and a mutually profitable liaison developed."

The X-2 field base in Rome, after it was established in OSS MEDTO, eventually fell under the direction of James Angleton. Angleton would spend the next several decades hunting after Kim Philby.
