= Isaiah Sol Dorfman =

American lawyer

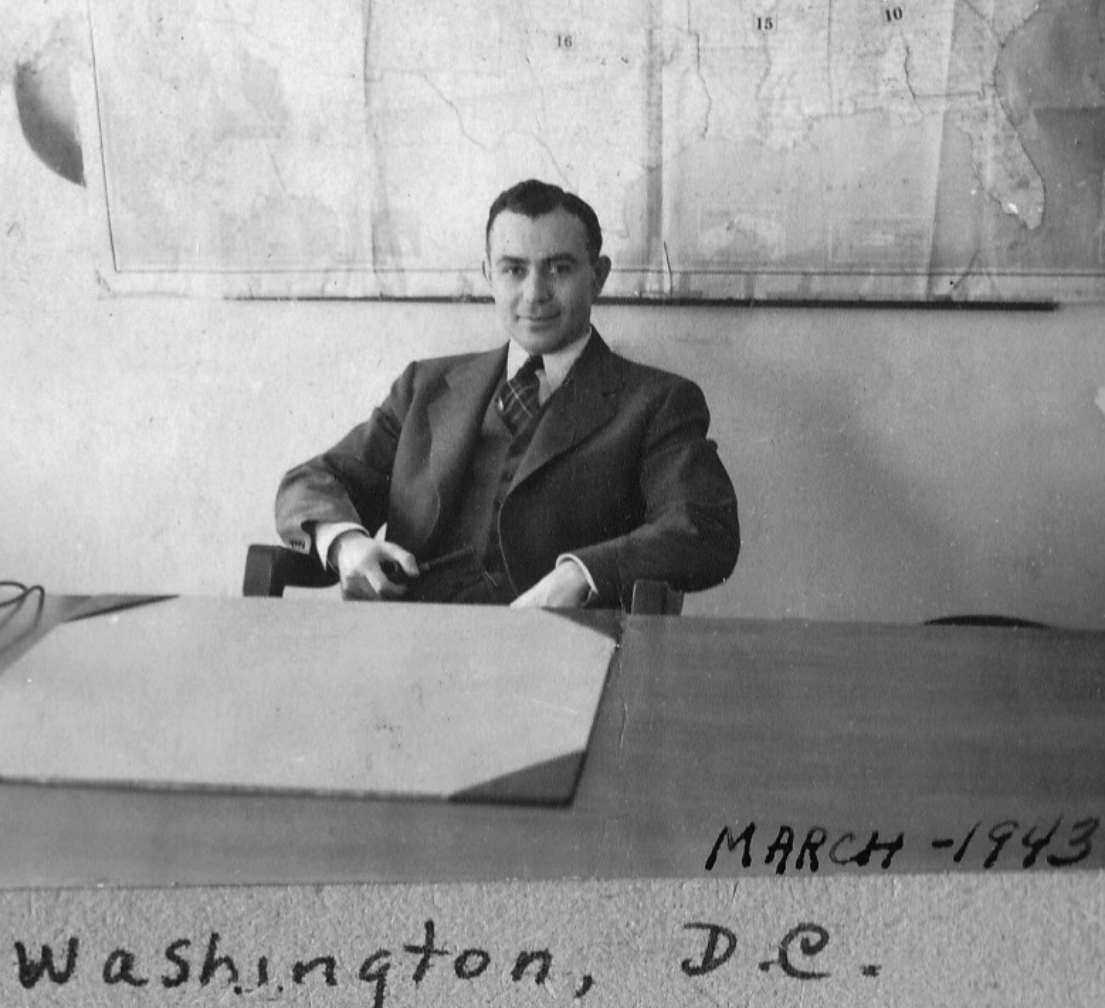
- Isaiah Sol Dorfman at his desk in 1943

Military attaché to Stockholm Embassy
- In office 1944–1945

Chief Analyst at OSS/London
- In office 1943–1944

Personal details
- Born: March 17, 1907 Kiev, Ukraine, Russian Empire
- Died: June 1, 2005 (aged 98) Northwestern Memorial Hospital, Chicago, Illinois

Isaiah Solomon "Sol" Dorfman (March 17, 1907 – June 1, 2005) was an American labor lawyer and an Office of Strategic Services (OSS) officer.

== Early life ==
Dorfman was born on March 17, 1907, in Kiev, Ukraine, Russian Empire, son of Samuel and Ella Dorfman. At the age of six his family migrated to Montreal, Quebec, Canada and then settled down in Chicago, Illinois, United States.

Dorfman graduated from the University of Chicago and was admitted to the Bar in 1931. He married Lillian Schley and became a U.S. citizen the same year. He worked in private practice, specializing in labor law.

== New Deal ==
During the New Deal Dorfman held a key posts at the National Labor Relations Board (NLRB), first as attorney in Washington D.C. 1934–1937 and as the NLRB regional attorney in Chicago (Region 13) 1937–1942. He represented the NLRB in the legal case following the Inland Steel strike, which affirmed the right to collective bargaining of American workers. From 1941–1942 he was a member of the Chicago Bar Association Committee on Federal Legislation. In 1942–1943 Dorfman was head of the Special Litigations Unit based in Washington, D.C. and taught labor law at the National University School of Law.

== OSS officer ==
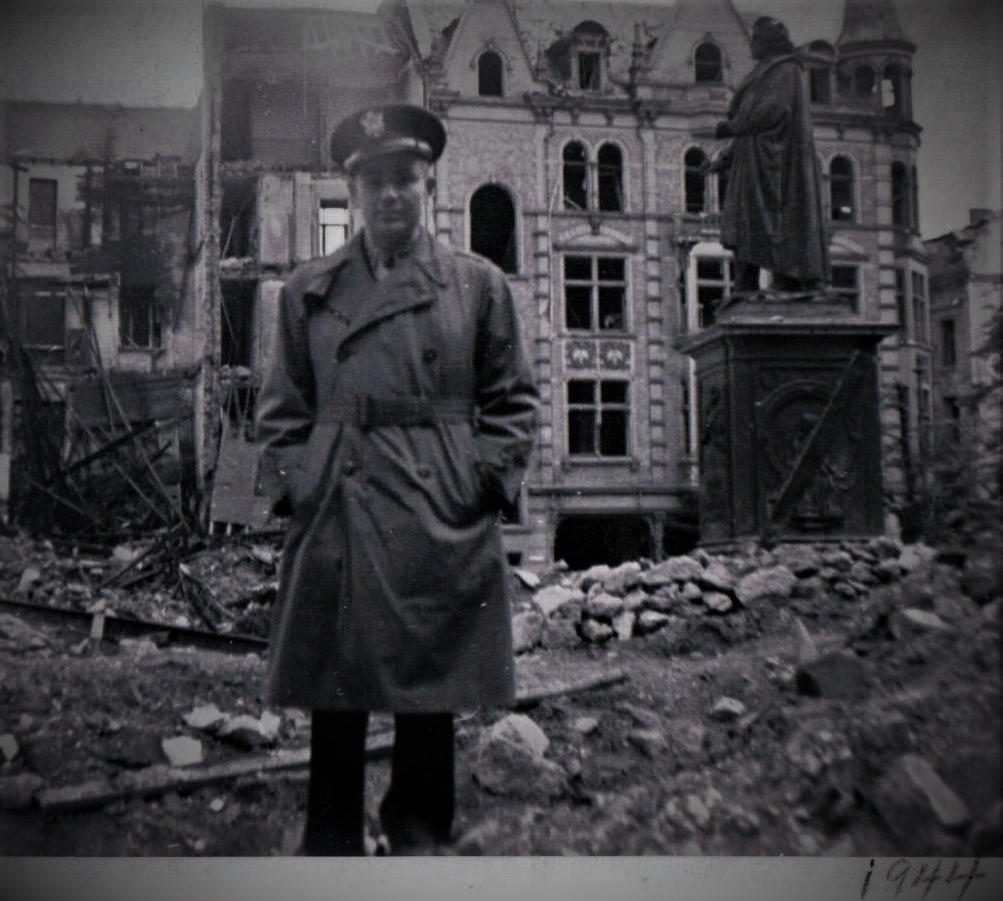
Sol in 1944.

As a German-language speaker, Dorfman was recruited by the Office of Strategic Services and sent to Europe to recruit agents within the German labor movement. He served as chief analyst at OSS/London from 1943–1944, and as an attaché at the U.S. Embassy in Stockholm 1944–1945 (working for the OSS Labor Desk). He arrived in Stockholm in early June 1943. Dorfman was assisted by Lillian Traugott, who spoke Swedish. In Stockholm, Dorfman established contacts with exile politicians and trade unionists such as Willy Brandt, Bruno Kreisky, Vilmos Böhm and Ernst Paul. He took part in meetings of the International Group of Democratic Socialists (a.k.a. The Little Internationale) as an American trade union representative.

== Post-war career ==
In 1945 he founded the Dorfman, DeKoven & Cohen law firm. From 1947–1950 he again served as member of the Chicago Bar Association Committee on Federal Legislation. In the 1950s he began representing Shure Inc. He was a member of the Chicago Bar Association Committee on Unauthorized Law Practice 1961–1964. He served as vice chairman of the Chicago Bar Association 1965–1966, and as its chairman 1966–1967. He was a member of the Chicago Bar Association committees on Labor and Employment Law and Administrative Law 1979–1980. He was also a member of the Illinois State Bar Association and the American Bar Association. He was a member of B'nai B'rith.

From 1976-1993, the Isaiah S. Dorfman Fund provided financial support for library acquisitions and outstanding achievement in Labor Law at the University of Chicago Law School. The proceeds were diverted to the student-edited Chicago Journal of International Law in 1993.

Dorfman died on June 1, 2005, of a heart attack and pneumonia at Northwestern Memorial Hospital.
