= Kindleberger =

Kindleberger is a surname. Notable people with the surname include:

- Charles P. Kindleberger (1910–2003), American economic historian and author
- Jacob Kindleberger (1875-1947), Founder of Kalamazoo Vegetable Parchment (KVP) Company
- Richard Kindleberger (1942–2010), American journalist

== See also ==
- 42354 Kindleberger, an asteroid
- James H. Kindelberger, American aviator
