= Robert Roosa =

American economist

Robert Vincent Roosa
- Born: June 21, 1918; Marquette, Michigan, U.S.
- Died: December 23, 1993 (aged 75); Port Chester, New York, U.S.

Academic background
- Education: University of Michigan

Robert Vincent Roosa (June 21, 1918 – December 23, 1993) was an American economist and banker. He served as Treasury Undersecretary for Monetary Affairs during the Kennedy administration from 1961 to 1964. He believed the U.S. dollar should be the world's leading currency and reference point because the United States was the leading political and economic power.

== Early years ==
Born in Marquette, Michigan, he studied at the University of Michigan, receiving his A.B. in 1939. He received a Rhodes Scholarship but due to the outbreak of war in Europe did not attend Oxford. Instead, he remained at Michigan, taking M.A. and Ph.D. degrees in 1940 and 1942 respectively. Between 1939 and 1943, he taught economics at Michigan, Harvard, and at the Massachusetts Institute of Technology. During World War II he served in London as assistant to Charles P. Kindleberger in the Enemy Objectives Unit, identifying potentially valuable enemy targets.

== Postwar years ==
From 1946 he worked at the Federal Reserve Bank of New York, ultimately reaching the position of vice president in the bank's research department. He then joined the Treasury, under John F. Kennedy, as Undersecretary for Monetary Affairs, where he helped to address the balance of payments problem facing America at that time. One of his solutions was the creation of bonds that would attract and allow foreign holders of dollars to turn them into long-term assets as an alternative to buying U.S. gold. Known as Roosa bonds, they were bought with dollars, but denominated and repaid in Swiss francs. Roosa believed that the international monetary system should be based on a reference and that the reference should be the U.S. dollar. He continued under the administration of Lyndon B. Johnson until 1964.

Roosa joined the Wall Street firm Brown Brothers Harriman as a partner, in 1965. In 1966, he was elected to both the American Academy of Arts and Sciences and the American Philosophical Society. He was a director at the Council on Foreign Relations between 1966 and 1981, and a trustee of the Rockefeller Foundation. He also became a member of the influential Washington-based financial advisory body, the Group of Thirty in 1979. He was also a member of the Trilateral Commission, a non-governmental organization aimed at fostering closer cooperation between North America, Western Europe, and Japan. From 1975 to 1986, he was chairman of the Brookings Institution. Roosa retired from Brown Brothers in 1991.

== Personal ==
Roosa was married to Ruth Roosa (née AmEnde), who died in October 1993. They had two daughters. Roosa died in Port Chester, New York in December 1993, aged 75.

== Publications ==
- Milton Friedman and Robert V. Roosa, The Balance of Payments: Free Versus Fixed Exchange Rates, American Enterprise Institute for Public Policy Research, Washington, D.C. (1967)
- Robert V. Roosa (1965). Monetary reform for the world economy. Published for the Council on Foreign Relations by Harper & Row.
- Robert V. Roosa (1964). The Management of the National Debt. Industrial College of the Armed Forces.
- Robert V. Roosa (1983). Economic Instability and Flexible Exchange Rates: A Seminar Organized by the Institute of Southeast Asian Studies, 12 April 1982, Singapore. Institute of Southeast Asian Studies. ISBN 978-9971-902-59-9.
