= Old Naval Observatory =

- U.S. National Register of Historic Places
- U.S. National Historic Landmark
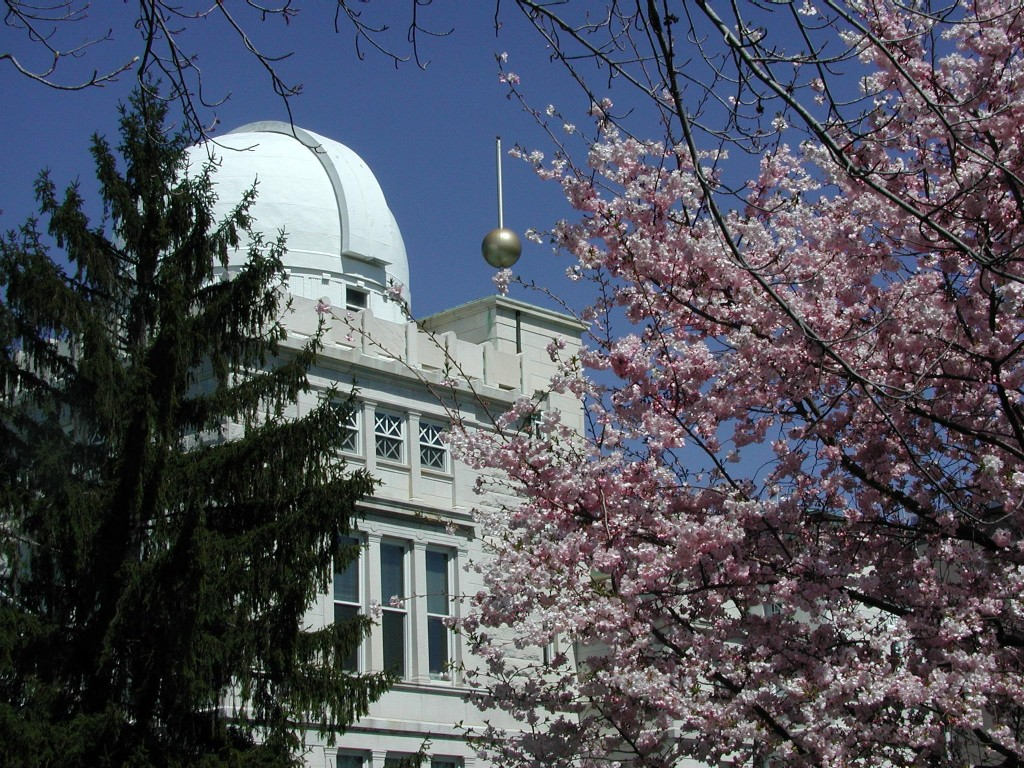

- Location within Central Washington, D.C. Location within the District of Columbia Location within the United States
- Location: 23rd Street and E Street, N.W., Washington, D.C.
- Coordinates: 38.895103°N 77.0514428°W
- Built: 1844
- Architect: James Melville Gilliss
- NRHP reference No.: 66000864

Significant dates
- Added to NRHP: October 15, 1966
- Designated NHL: January 12, 1965

The Old Naval Observatory is a historic site at 23rd and E Street in Northwest, Washington, D.C. It is where the United States Naval Observatory was located from 1844 to 1893, when it moved to its present grounds. The original observatory building, built 1839–40, still stands, and is a designated National Historic Landmark as of 1965. The Washington meridian of 1850 passes through the Observatory.

The campus around the old observatory is split into two parts: the Potomac Annex to the east (where the observatory stands) and the E Street Complex, also known as Navy Hill, to the west. These two parts are separated geographically as the Potomac Annex is at the top of the hill, while the E Street Complex is farther down. The E Street Complex is also designated as a National Historical Landmark as of December 14, 2016.

The campus for many years housed the Navy's Bureau of Medicine and Surgery, which moved out in 2012. The property has been taken over by the State Department.

== History ==
=== Observatory ===
The observatory was built in order to compete with European observatories. The observatory operated from 1844 to 1893.

Matthew Fontaine Maury was the first superintendent of the observatory, despite his interests lying more in oceanography and wind currents (The Naval Observatory was at that time still called The Depot of Charts and Instruments). Under Maury, the observatory drafted charts on wind and ocean currents along with numerous volumes of sailing instructions. As a Virginian, Maury resigned in 1861 to join the Confederacy. He was replaced with James M. Gilliss, who had been in charge of the construction of the observatory. In 1863, Abraham Lincoln visited the observatory at night to ask an astrological question to the astronomer on duty, Asaph Hall.

Gilliss died suddenly in February of 1865 and Admiral Charles Davis appointed himself superintendent in Gilliss' stead. In 1870, Congress passed a special appropriation to allow Davis to purchase a new refracting telescope as their old telescope, a 9.6in refractor, had been outdated since its purchase. The new telescope was purchased from a shop in Cambridgeport, Massachusetts and was delivered a full two years ahead of schedule. The telescope had a 26in refractor lens and was 32ft long, weighed 1 and 1/4th tons, and dubbed the "Great Equatorial." It was the largest refracting telescope in the world at that time, and brought prestige to both the observatory and the United States. It was with this telescope that the Moons of Mars were discovered by Asaph Hall in 1877. This telescope is still in operation today in the new U.S. Naval Observatory.

In 1845, a time ball was added to the top of the observatory's dome which dropped every day at noon to signal the time. With Davis at the head, the observatory's exact time-keeping was used to standardize the time not only across Washington, D.C. but also around the country. Telegraph lines were laid by 1869 to the Navy Department, the Washington fire bells, and, thanks to the Western Union Telegraph Company, nearly all railroads operating in the southern states. The observatory also had a line to the Mutual Life Insurance Company in New York City that, when signaled by the observatory, would drop their own time ball.

The observatory was closed in 1893 in favor of a new U.S. Naval Observatory facility on Massachusetts Avenue due to persistent malaria outbreaks. The building and grounds were retained by the U.S. Navy, which first used it to house the Naval Museum of Hygiene from 1894 to 1902.

=== Naval Medical Hospital and National Institute of Health ===
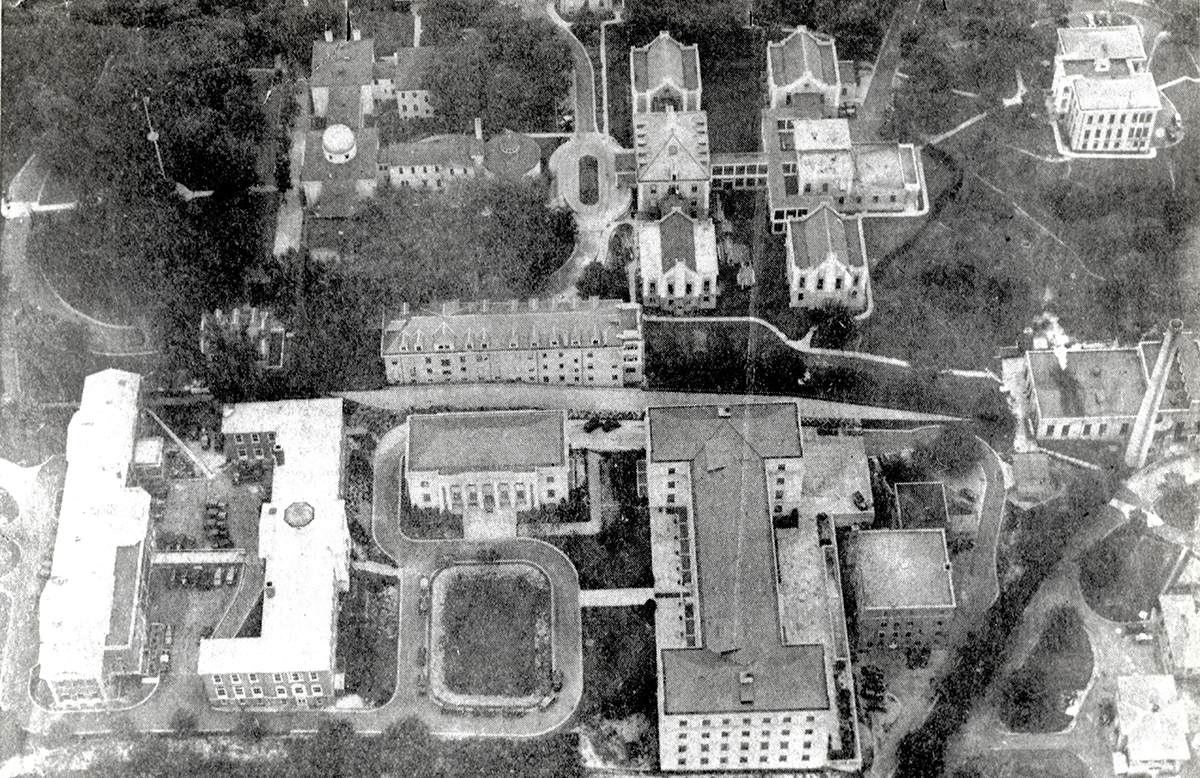
The campus in 1936, looking east. The NIH buildings are along the bottom, the Naval Hospital is at center, and the old observatory is at top left.

The Museum of Hygiene was made into a Navy medical school in 1902. Beginning in 1903, the Naval Medical Hospital was constructed behind the old observatory, and it remained in use until 1942, when both the medical school and hospital operations were transferred to the National Naval Medical Center in Bethesda, Maryland. While the Potomac Annex was used as a hospital, a nurse's building and doctor's quarters were also built to the east and west of the hospital.

The U.S. Public Health Service Hygienic Laboratory, later the National Institutes of Health, moved into the other side of the campus in 1904 from the Marine Hospital in Stapleton, Staten Island. The Potomac Annex was largely undeveloped and unused until this time. Five buildings would be built in the E Street Complex: the North Building in 1904, an animal house in 1915, the Central Building in 1919, and the Administration and South Buildings in 1934. The animal house was used for animal testing, and is today called the East Building. In 1938, NIH moved to a new campus in Bethesda.

=== Office of Strategic Services and Central Intelligence Agency ===
The headquarters of the Office of Strategic Services was located in the E Street Complex until its dissolution in 1945. The superseding Central Intelligence Agency kept their headquarters in the E Street Complex until 1961. While the CIA moved their headquarters off of Navy Hill in 1961, they retained offices on the campus until 1987. In 1963, multiple buildings were demolished to construct the E Street Expressway.

=== Navy Bureau of Medicine and Surgery ===
The campus housed the Navy's Bureau of Medicine and Surgery from 1942 until 2012.

=== Department of State ===
The grounds and observatory are closed to the public. The entire Navy Hill has been transferred to the United States Department of State due to Base Realignment and Closure, although the Navy retains ownership of some structures on the campus. In 2014, the Department of State began expanding onto Navy Hill. A joint venture consisting of the architectural firms of Goody, Clancy and the Louis Berger Group won a $2.5 million contract in January 2014 to begin planning the renovation of the buildings on the 11.8-acre (4.8 ha) Navy Hill campus.

== See also ==
- List of astronomical observatories
