= Whitney Shepardson =

American businessman, diplomat, and intelligence officer (1890–1966)

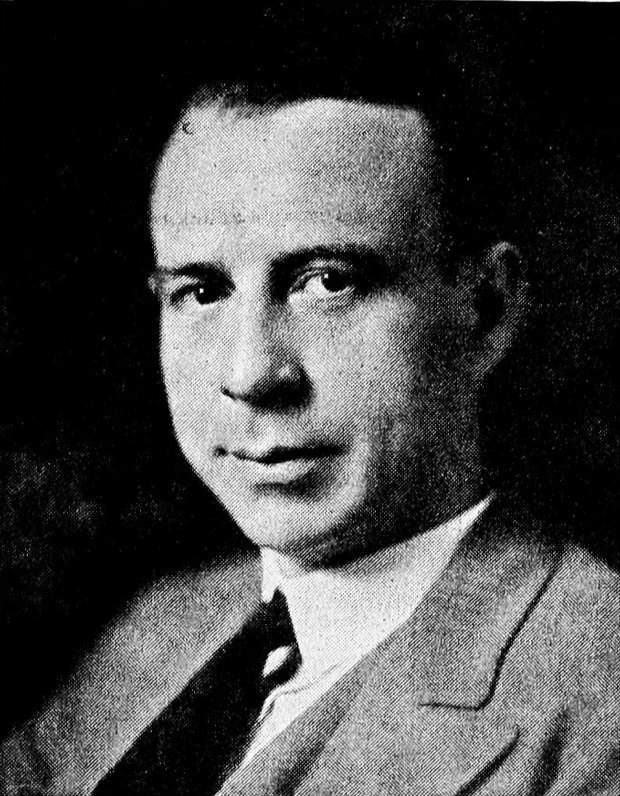
- Shepardson in 1938

Chief of the Secret Intelligence Branch
- In office 1943–1945
- Preceded by: David K. E. Bruce
- Succeeded by: Office Abolished

Chief of SI/London
- In office 1941–1943

Secretary to the Commission on the Covenant of the League of Nations
- In office 1919

Personal details
- Born: October 30, 1890 Worcester, Massachusetts
- Died: May 29, 1966 (aged 75)
- Education: Colgate University; Balliol College, Oxford; Harvard Law School

Military service
- Allegiance: United States
- Branch/service: United States Army; Field Artillery Branch
- Years of service: 1918–1919
- Rank: Second lieutenant

Whitney Hart Shepardson (October 30, 1890 – May 29, 1966) was an American businessman and foreign policy expert. He headed the Secret Intelligence Branch of the Office of Strategic Services during World War II.

Shepardson was born in Worcester, Massachusetts. He attended Colgate Academy, where his father was principal. He graduated from Colgate University in 1910. While at Colgate, he played on the basketball team and was a member of Kappa Epsilon. He was also the Assistant Treasurer of the student's association, served on the Yearbook staff, and wrote for the student newspaper. After Colgate, he attended Balliol College, Oxford as a Rhodes Scholar, where he took a First Class in modern history. After his time at Oxford, he taught for a year at St. Mark's School. He completed his education at Harvard Law School. He would practice law only briefly, serving as an attorney during World War I for the United States Shipping Board between May 1917 and July 1918.

In 1918, Shepardson went into active duty service in the Field Artillery Branch of the United States Army.

Shepardson's involvement in international relations began when sent to the 1919 Paris Peace Conference by the State Department as an aide to Edward M. House, where he became secretary to the commission responsible for drafting the Covenant of the League of Nations. He was secretary also to a group of Americans seeking to organize the international relations institute which would become the Council on Foreign Relations. Shepardson was a founding member of the board. From 1920, he wrote for the Round Table, a British journal edited by former Beit Lecturer in Colonial History, Lionel Curtis.

Following the war, he worked in Vienna as European manager for American shipping agency P.N. Gray and Co.

Between 1925 and 1927 he served as a director on John D. Rockefeller's General Education Board, specialising in the development of agricultural and biological research. He was a director of the Woodrow Wilson Foundation.

Shepardson was president of Bates International Bag Company from 1928 to 1930. He was vice-president of International Railways of Central America, a transport arm of the United Fruit Company, from 1931 until 1942.

After the outbreak of war in Europe he was appointed to lead the political group of the CFR's War and Peace Studies project. Following the involvement of the United States in war, he served with the Office of Strategic Services in Washington and London. In London, he was special assistant to the U.S. ambassador, and became first London head of Secret Intelligence. He became head of the agency's Secret Intelligence Branch in 1943, staying with the organization which would ultimately become part of the Central Intelligence Agency, until 1946.

Post-war, he became director of the Carnegie Corporation's British Dominions and Colonies Fund.

From 1953 to 1956 Shepardson served as president of the National Committee for a Free Europe.
