= Secret Intelligence Branch =

Defunct intelligence organization of the United States

Agency overview
- Formed: June 1942
- Dissolved: 1945
- Headquarters: E Street Complex, Washington, D.C.
- Agency executive: David K. E. Bruce, Chief (1942–1943); Whitney Shepardson, Chief (1943–1945)

The Secret Intelligence Branch of the United States' Office of Strategic Services (OSS) was a wartime foreign intelligence service responsible for the collection of human intelligence from a network of field stations in Asia, Europe, and the Middle East.

In October 1941, while still at the Office of the Coordinator of Information (COI), William Donovan assigned David K. E. Bruce to head up a newly established unit called Special Activities/Bruce (SA/B). Another unit called Special Activities/Goodfellow (SA/G) would be led by Millard Preston Goodfellow.

In June 1942, the COI was restructured into the newly established OSS. SA/B became the Secret Intelligence Branch, retaining Bruce as its director. SA/G became the Special Operations Branch (SO), with the staff being divided between Goodfellow and Lieutenant Colonel Ellery Huntington, Jr.

Bruce was succeeded in 1943 by the business executive and international relations expert, Whitney Shepardson.

With the post-war abolition of the OSS, in October 1945, the Secret Intelligence branch became part of the Strategic Services Unit of the Department of War. The unit was ultimately incorporated into the Central Intelligence Group, which became the Central Intelligence Agency in 1947.
