= David K. E. Bruce =

American politician (1898–1977)

His Excellency David K. E. Bruce
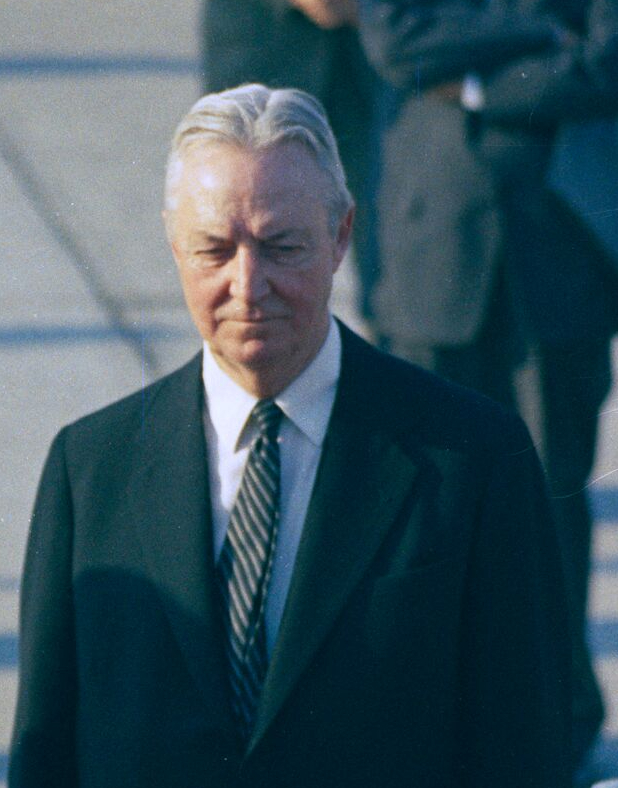
- Bruce in 1962

10th United States Ambassador to NATO
- In office October 17, 1974 – February 12, 1976
- Appointed by: Gerald Ford
- Preceded by: Donald Rumsfeld
- Succeeded by: Robert Strausz-Hupé

Chief of the U.S. Liaison Office to the People's Republic of China
- In office May 14, 1973 – September 25, 1974
- President: Richard Nixon; Gerald Ford
- Preceded by: Diplomatic relations established
- Succeeded by: George H. W. Bush

51st United States Ambassador to the United Kingdom
- In office March 17, 1961 – March 20, 1969
- President: John F. Kennedy; Lyndon B. Johnson; Richard Nixon
- Preceded by: John Hay Whitney
- Succeeded by: Walter Annenberg

United States Ambassador to Germany
- In office April 17, 1957 – October 29, 1959
- President: Dwight D. Eisenhower
- Preceded by: James B. Conant
- Succeeded by: Walter C. Dowling

United States Ambassador to France
- In office May 17, 1949 – March 10, 1952
- President: Harry S. Truman
- Preceded by: Jefferson Caffery
- Succeeded by: James Clement Dunn

17th United States Under Secretary of State
- In office April 1, 1952 – January 20, 1953
- Preceded by: James E. Webb
- Succeeded by: Walter B. Smith

Member of the Virginia House of Delegates for Charlotte County
- In office January 10, 1940 – January 11, 1944
- Preceded by: Berkley D. Adams
- Succeeded by: John H. Daniel

Chief of OSS/Europe
- In office 1942–1945
- Preceded by: William Phillips
- Succeeded by: Office Abolished

Chief of the Secret Intelligence Branch
- In office 1942–1943
- Preceded by: Himself
- Succeeded by: Whitney Shepardson

Chief of Special Activities/Bruce (SA/B)
- In office 1941–1942
- Preceded by: Office Established
- Succeeded by: Office Abolished

Deputy Coordinator of the Office of the Coordinator of Information
- In office 1941–1942

Member of the Maryland House of Delegates representing Baltimore
- In office 1924–1926

Personal details
- Born: David Kirkpatrick Este Bruce; February 12, 1898 Baltimore, Maryland, U.S.
- Died: December 5, 1977 (aged 79) Washington, D.C., U.S.
- Resting place: Oak Hill Cemetery; Washington, D.C., U.S.
- Party: Democratic
- Spouses: Ailsa Mellon (m. 1926; div. 1945) Evangeline Bell (m. 1945)
- Children: 4
- Education: University of Maryland Law School

Military service
- Allegiance: United States
- Branch/service: United States Army; Military Intelligence Division; Office of the Coordinator of Information; Office of Strategic Services
- Years of service: 1917–1920; 1941–1945
- Rank: Colonel
- Battles/wars: World War I World War II

David Kirkpatrick Este Bruce (February 12, 1898 – December 5, 1977) was an American diplomat, intelligence officer and politician. During World War II, he was considered one of the three most strategically important intelligence officers at the Office of Strategic Services (OSS), with tens of thousands of personnel under his command, and the lives of secretly-deployed spies and special operators operating behind enemy lines under his direct supervision. After the war, he served as ambassador to France, the Federal Republic of Germany, and the United Kingdom (the only American to hold all three offices) and later was the first U.S. emissary to the People's Republic of China.

== Early life ==
Bruce was born in Baltimore, Maryland, to William Cabell Bruce and Louise Este (Fisher) Bruce (1864–1945). His grandfather Charles Bruce (1826-1896) was a prominent lawyer and planter in Southside Virginia who fought for the Confederate States of America, and served as a U.S. Senator from Maryland. Bruce's uncle, Charles Morrelle Bruce, became acting governor of the Arizona territory, and two other uncles became noted academics. One of his three brothers was James Cabell Bruce. David Bruce initially studied at the Gilman County School for Boys in Baltimore. He then traveled to New Jersey and studied for a year and a half at Princeton University.

=== Military service ===
Bruce dropped out of Princeton to serve in the United States Army during World War I. An artillery sergeant, he arrived in Europe but saw no action before the armistice. After being commissioned as a second lieutenant, he served in the army courier service after the conflict. At parental insistence, he did not return to Princeton, but attended the University of Virginia School of Law (1919–1920) and the University of Maryland School of Law (1920–1921) Although not taking a degree from either school, Bruce passed the Maryland bar examination at the top of his class, and was admitted to the Maryland bar in November 1921.

== Career ==
=== State service ===
Baltimore voters elected Bruce to represent them in the Maryland House of Delegates (1924–1926). Much later he defeated a prominent critic of his friend Harry Flood Byrd in the 1939 Democratic primary. He represented Charlotte County in the Virginia House of Delegates for two terms (1940–1942), as well as renovated the now-historic home his grandfather built, as discussed below.

=== Interwar philanthropist and author ===
Although Bruce's first diplomatic post, as vice-consul in Rome, was cut short in 1927 due to his wife's ill health, upon returning to the United States, Bruce lived in Washington and New York, where he dabbled on Wall Street and sat on various corporate boards. He also helped his father-in-law create the National Gallery of Art, of which he would serve as president from 1939-1945. Bruce also published Seven Pillars of the Republic in 1936, a book of biographical essays on American Presidents from George Washington to Andrew Jackson. He would expand it twice. In 1939 he expanded it to cover all presidents through Abraham Lincoln, under the revised title Revolution to Reconstruction, and in 1962 revised them as Sixteen American Presidents.

=== Federal service ===
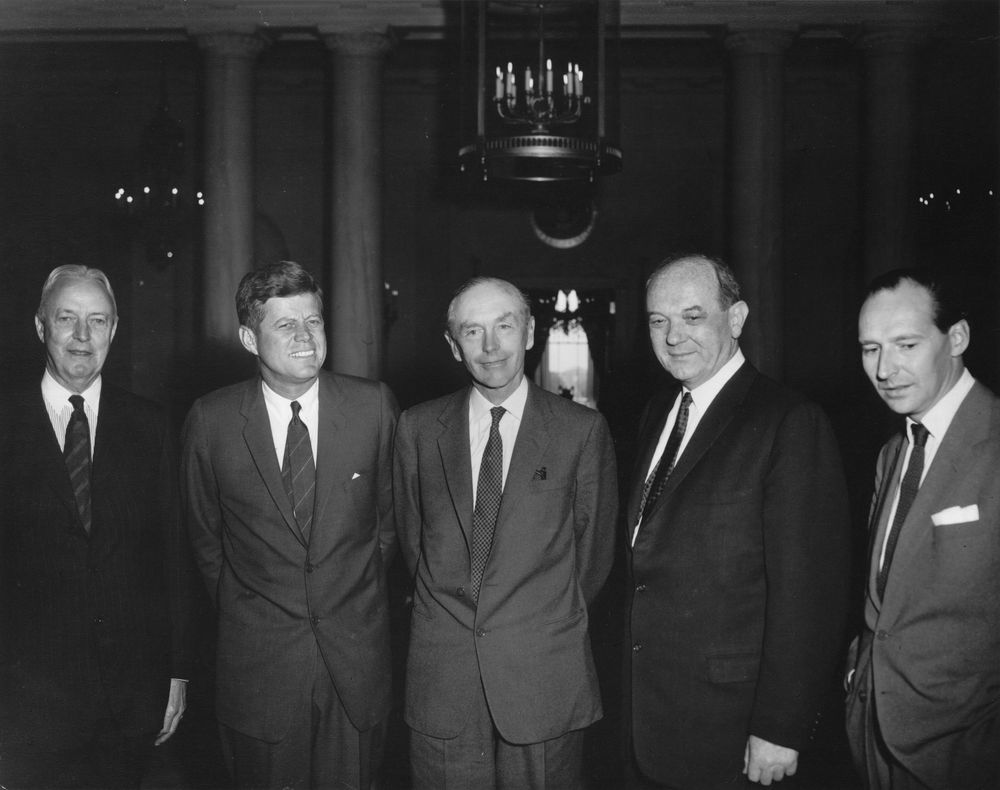
Left to right: David K. E. Bruce; President Kennedy; Lord Home; Dean Rusk; Sir David Ormsby-Gore. Pictured at the Entrance Hall of the White House in Washington, D.C.

Bruce volunteed for an American Red Cross mission in London in 1940, and experinced the Battle of Britain and the Blitz firsthand, which with his pro-British sentiments, caused him to oppose American isolationism.

Before the United States entered World War II, Bruce had already been working for the Military Intelligence Division, and had been recruited by William Donovan into the Office of the Coordinator of Information (COI). He held the rank of major, and later lieutenant colonel in the Army Air Corps.

Bruce was appointed Chief of a unit at COI called Special Activities/Bruce (SA/B), which would later become the Secret Intelligence Branch of the Office of Strategic Services (OSS), a precursor to the Central Intelligence Agency (CIA). Another unit of the COI called Special Activities/Goodfellow (SA/G) was managed by Millard Preston Goodfellow, which became the Special Operations Branch (SO).

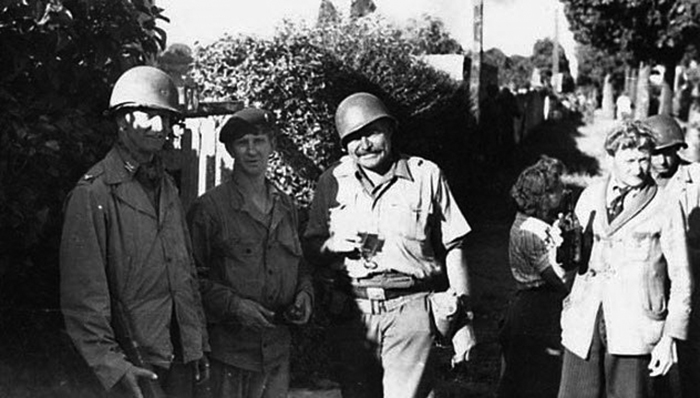
David Bruce (left), the Commander of OSS/London and OSS/Europe, and the author Ernest Hemingway (middle), at Rambouillet with members of the French Resistance the day of the Liberation of Paris. Hemingway and his son were both involved in the OSS, and under Bruce's command.

During World War II, Bruce headed OSS/London, the largest overseas field headquarters of the OSS. He trained more than 3,000 people to assist French partisans and coordinated espionage and intelligence activities behind enemy lines for the United States Armed Forces branches. Other OSS functions included the use of propaganda, subversion, and post-war planning. He observed the invasion of Normandy landing there the day after the initial invasion.

After leaving the OSS at the end of World War II, and before entering the diplomatic field, in 1948–1949 David Bruce served as assistant secretary of commerce and oversaw American aid to France with the Economic Cooperation Administration which administered the Marshall Plan. During this time that David Bruce and his new 2nd wife (discussed below) became an early member of the informal Georgetown Set within D.C.

Bruce, as a member of the new President's Board of Consultants on Foreign Intelligence Activities, wrote a secret report on the CIA's covert operations for President Dwight D. Eisenhower in 1956 that was highly critical of its operation under Allen Dulles's leadership.

=== Diplomatic service ===
Bruce served as the United States Ambassador to France from 1949 to 1952, then briefly as undersecretary of state during the Truman administration (1952-1953), but came to dislike the Washington bureaucracy. In 1953, President Eisenhower appointed Bruce (though a Democrat) as envoy to the European Coal and Steel Community and European Defense Community. He served until 1955, hoping to rearm Germany so that it could assist western defenses against the Soviet Union. However, despite his efforts and those of his friend Jean Monnet, France refused to accept the European Defense Community, and Bruce returned to the United States for two inactive years.

In 1957, President Eisenhower appointed Bruce United States Ambassador to West Germany, and he served for two years (1957 to 1959) but found the Bonn post less congenial than Paris. Although mentioned as a possible Secretary of State in the incoming Kennedy administration, Bruce instead became United States Ambassador to the United Kingdom from 1961 to 1969. Some considered him the most effective 20th century American ambassador to the United Kingdom, as well as the longest-serving, since he continued into the Johnson administration, although Johnson ignored many of his recommendations.

With regard to Vietnam, Bruce privately questioned U.S. involvement and constantly urged the Johnson administration to allow Britain more of a role in bringing the conflict to an end. During the Nixon administration, Bruce was an American envoy at the Paris peace talks between the United States and North Vietnam in 1970 and 1971. Bruce also served as the first United States emissary to the People's Republic of China from 1973 to 1974. He was the ambassador to the North Atlantic Treaty Organization from late 1974 to 1976.

Bruce served as the Honorary Chair on the Board of Trustees of the American School in London during his diplomatic career in the United Kingdom.

== Personal life ==
Bruce was an Episcopalian. On May 29, 1926, Bruce married Ailsa Mellon, the daughter of the banker and diplomat Andrew W. Mellon. They had one daughter, but Ailsa developed a debilitating but undiagnosable illness during David's first diplomatic posting (as vice counsel in Rome in 1926-1927), and they eventually divorced on April 20, 1945. Their only daughter, Audrey, and her husband, Stephen Currier, were presumed dead when a plane in which they were flying in the Caribbean disappeared on January 17, 1967, after requesting permission to fly over Culebra, a U. S. Navy installation. No trace of the plane, pilot, or passengers was ever found. Audrey and Stephen Currier left three children: Andrea, Lavinia, and Michael.

He married Evangeline Bell (1914–1995) on April 23, 1945, three days after his divorce. They met in wartime London. She was a granddaughter of Sir Herbert Conyers Surtees, a niece of Sir Patrick Ramsay, a stepdaughter of Ambassador Sir James Leishman Dodds, and the elder sister of Virginia Surtees (who married, and divorced, Sir Henry Ashley Clarke, the British Ambassador to Italy). They had two sons and one daughter, Alexandra (called Sasha). Alexandra died under mysterious circumstances (possibly murder or suicide) in 1975 at age 29 at the Bruce family home in Virginia.

Bruce purchased and restored Staunton Hill, his grandfather's former estate in Charlotte County, Virginia, which he represented in the Virginia House of Delegates during World War II, as described above, and made it his rural retreat between diplomatic postings and his Georgetown residence. He also donated funds to eleven nearby counties anonymously to build public facilities, among which was a regional public library somewhat to the east, serving Brunswick and Greensville Counties, which opened in October 25, 1940 and continues as the Brunswick Historical Society headquarters as newer buildings now serve both counties.

== Death and legacy ==
Bruce died on December 5, 1977, of a heart attack at Georgetown University Medical Center. He was buried at Oak Hill Cemetery in Washington, D.C.

=== Awards ===
Bruce received the Distinguished Service Medal (U.S. Army) in 1945 for his work with the OSS as well as the French Legion of Honor and also became an honorary Commander of the British Empire. He was awarded the Presidential Medal of Freedom, with Distinction, in 1976.

=== Legacy ===
The David K.E. Bruce Award was established in 2007 at the American School in London. Staunton Hill was placed on the National Register of Historic Places in 1969

== See also ==
- William Cabell Bruce
- James Cabell Bruce
- List of people who disappeared mysteriously at sea

Diplomatic posts
Preceded by Jefferson Caffery	U.S. Ambassador to France; May 17, 1949 – March 10, 1952	Succeeded by James Clement Dunn
Preceded by James E. Webb	Under Secretary of State; April 1, 1952 – January 20, 1953	Succeeded by Walter B. Smith
Preceded by James B. Conant	U.S. Ambassador to Germany; April 17, 1957 – October 29, 1959	Succeeded by Walter C. Dowling
Preceded by John Hay Whitney	U.S. Ambassador to the United Kingdom; March 17, 1961 – March 20, 1969	Succeeded by Walter H. Annenberg
Preceded by none	Chief of the U.S. Liaison Office in Beijing; May 14, 1973 – September 25, 1974	Succeeded by George H. W. Bush
Preceded by Donald Rumsfeld	U.S. Permanent Representative to NATO; October 17, 1974 – February 12, 1976	Succeeded by Robert Strausz-Hupe
