= International Group of Democratic Socialists =

International Group of Democratic Socialists (German: Internationale Gruppe demokratischer Sozialisten, often nicknamed as Kleine Internationale) was a Stockholm-based discussion group and study circle of social democrats, active from 1942 to 1945. Participants included Willy Brandt, Alva Myrdal, Gunnar Myrdal and Bruno Kreisky. The group focused largely on discussions of rebuilding post-war Europe.

== Formative stage ==
Foreign citizens were not allowed to engage in political activities in Sweden. However, in June 1942 a group of Norwegian exiles set up their study group in Stockholm. By October 1942 the couple Gunnar Myrdal and Alva Myrdal had joined the group. During its existence the International Group of Democratic Socialists gathered participants from 14 countries. As of 1942, it had some sixty members from different socialist parties from Scandinavia, Germany, Austria, France, Czechoslovakia, Poland and Hungary. A working committee consisting of Hilding Färm (secretary of the Swedish Social Democratic Youth League), Inge Scheflo (Norwegian trade unionist), Fritz Tarnow (German trade unionist) and Ernst Paul (chairman of the Brotherhood of Sudeten German Social Democrats) organized the meetings of the study group.

== Peace committee ==
In November 1942 a committee was set up to elaborate a common peace plan for post-war Europe. Paul was the chairman of the committee, Brandt (who was a member of both the Norwegian Labour Party and the German socialist diaspora) its secretary. Other members of the committee were Gunnar Myrdal (Sweden), Ole Jödahl (Sweden, foreign affairs editor of Aftontidningen and Tiden), Martin Tranmæl (Norway), Tarnow, Vilmos Böhm (Hungary), István Szende (Hungarian, member of the Socialist Workers' Party of Germany), Jiří Jakerle (head of the Club of Czechoslovak Socialists), Maurycy Karniol (lawyer, representative of the Polish Socialist Party in Scandinavia), Jules Guesde (Press Attaché of the Stockholm delegation of the French Committee of National Liberation) and Bruno Kreisky (chairman of the Club of Austrian Socialists in Sweden). The International Group of Democratic Socialists hoped that peace in Europe would be achieved in different ways that the Treaty of Versailles, seeking to strengthen cooperation in post-war Europe.

== Legacy ==
Through the participation in the study group Myrdal became a political mentor of sorts to Brandt and Kreisky, who went on to lead governments in Germany and Austria respectively.
