= Research and Analysis Branch =

Branch of the Office of Strategic Services

Branch overview
- Formed: June 13, 1942; 84 years ago
- Dissolved: October 1, 1945
- Superseding branch: Bureau of Intelligence and Research
- Jurisdiction: Executive branch of the United States
- Branch executives: James Phinney Baxter III, (1942–1943); William L. Langer, (1943–1945)
- Parent department: Deputy Director Intelligence Service

In the United States, the Research and Analysis Branch (R&A) was a branch of the Office of Strategic Services (OSS). It was originally established in the Office of the Coordinator of Information (COI) with the appointment of James Phinney Baxter III as the first Director of Research and Analysis (July 31, 1941) and the branch became operational on August 27, 1941. Shortly thereafter, it was absorbed into the newly-established OSS with General Order 1 on October 17, 1942. Then on January 4, 1943, with the restructuring of the OSS in OSS General Order 9, R&A was placed under the leadership of the Deputy Director of the Intelligence Service.

With the dissolution of the OSS in 1945, R&A was transferred to the State Department and became the Bureau of Intelligence and Research.

The idea of R&A was originally envisioned by Archibald MacLeish and William Donovan.

The primary mission of this OSS Branch was "to collect, analyze, and disseminate foreign intelligence". Responsible for collecting open source intelligence, and evaluating all types of intelligence, R&A was tasked with identifying the strengths and weaknesses of the Axis powers in all of the active WWII theaters of operation. R&A was "widely recognized as the most valuable component of the OSS". Also known as the "cornerstone of the OSS", R&A made significant contributions to the Allied victory.

Staffed by "some of the best minds in America", the branch provided timely assessment of the Allied bombing campaign in Europe, studied operations in countries where Allied forces were fighting, and developed preparations for the occupation of Germany. It used notable historians, economists, geographers, anthropologists, political scientists, and subject matter experts to research and prepare reports for senior policy makers.

This work was done by "poring through papers, cables, reports, photographs, maps, journals, foreign newspapers, and other materials – laying the foundation of modern intelligence research and analysis".

Over 900 academics were recruited into R&A before the end of the war.

== Locations ==
R&A Headquarters

- Library of Congress Annex
- Apex Building in Federal Triangle
- Abandoned Ice Skating Rink
- Apartment building at corner of 23rd Street and E. Street, part of Potomac Hill / Navy Hill / E Street Complex

R&A Field Offices

- New York
- San Francisco

R&A Outposts

- Honolulu
- London
- Stockholm
- Moscow
- Algiers
- Cairo
- Istanbul
- New Delhi
- Chungking (Chongqing)

== Divisions ==
The divisions of R&A at the beginning of the war were not the same as the ones that it comprised at the end of the war. In the early days of R&A, arguments occurred between Division and Section Chiefs over jurisdictional matters regarding analysis and mission. The major restructuring of the R&A Divisions in 1943 was controversial throughout the branch. Barry Katz writes that "This [restructuring] was one of the most portentous administrative decisions of its history, but also the most traumatic, for it violated the received wisdom that the world is organized in the manner of a university catalogue."

At its peak product output in 1944, R&A was arranged into eight divisions. Four of these divisions were referred to as "Geographical Divisions," and organized the world into Geographical areas. These divisions were created out of the original Geographical Division that was created in 1941 under COI. Four of these divisions were "functional" in nature. Each of these divisions were further made up of sections and sub-divisions, differing between divisions in their makeup. The Geographic subdivisions were primarily divided further by "Geographic," "Economic," and "Political," Sub-divisions, and sections falling within that structure.

=== Europe-Africa Division ===
The Europe-Africa Division included the Political sections of Africa, Central Europe, the Balkans, Italy, the Near East, Scandinavia, and Western Europe. Sherman Kent was the Chief of the Europe-Africa Division. Assistant Chiefs of the Division were C. Morse and Harold Deutsch.

=== Far East Division ===
The Far East Division was responsible for the geographical area that included Imperial Japan, and the surrounding East Asia territories of the PTO. The Political Sub-Division of the Far East Division comprised the following sections: China, Japan, Korea and Manchuria, Southern Asia, and Pacific Islands.

=== Map Division ===
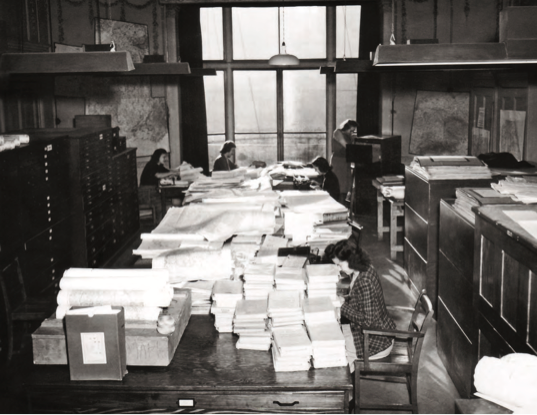

The Chief of the Map Division was Arthur H. Robinson. R&A's Map Division functioned as the "central repository for target intelligence collected by OSS around the world". "Winnowing out irrelevant details, the branch created accurate, customized maps for specific operations." The Subdivisions of the Map Division included; Special Photography, Cartography, Map Information, and Topographic Models.

=== Latin America Division ===
The Chief of the Latin America Division was Maurice H. Halperin. The Latin America Division was responsible for the geographical areas of South America, Central America, and the Caribbean.

=== USSR Division ===
The USSR Division was a separate division from the Europe-Africa Division, and perhaps had the most strenuous relationship with the State Department during the war for several reasons, including jurisdictional issues and the very fact that the OSS was collecting intelligence on an Allied power.

=== Current Intelligence Staff ===
The Current Intelligence Staff oversaw the publication of a series of highly regarded periodicals produced by R&A. The Current Intelligence Staff maintained a War Room for OSS leadership. It also produced the Current Intelligence Studies, which were sometimes abbreviated R&A studies, and it produced a daily situation report for use in the War Room.

=== Central Information Division (CID) ===
CID was the Division responsible for cataloguing, organizing, and indexing incoming information from the other divisions of the R&A. CID was often referred to as "the library," even though the library - officially called the Reference Section - was only one of the three sections of CID. Chief Wilmarth Lewis was quoted as saying that CID's "system has been called the best in Washington over and over again—within the week it was called so by the Army Staff College and was adopted in toto by them."

In addition to the Reference Section, CID also included the Pictorial Records Section and the Biographical Records Section.

Indexing was performed in series and category; "Regular Series," denoted open source and unclassified information, "XL Series," was used for secret information, "L Series," was used for information generated by the OSS, the "Order of Battle Series," were military documents about the military situation in-theater.

=== Interdepartmental Committee For Acquisition of Foreign Affairs ===
The Interdepartmental Committee was responsible for coordination of R&A with other agencies. The sections of this division included; Publications, Subject Index, Outposts.

==== Enemy Objectives Unit ====
The Enemy Objectives Unit, based in London, analyzed the German economy and war production, recommended particular targets and ultimately helped convince Allied air commanders that the key objectives of the bombing campaign should be first, German aircraft factories and second, German oil and synthetic oil production facilities.

== Notable researchers and staffers ==
R&A veterans included seven future presidents of the American Historical Association, five of the American Economic Association, one of the American Political Science Association, and two Nobel Laureates.

- Arthur Schlesinger Jr.
- Walt W. Rostow
- Edward Shils
- Herbert Marcuse
- H. Stuart Hughes
- Gordon A. Craig
- Crane Brinton
- John King Fairbank
- Sherman Kent
- Ralph Bunche
- Benjamin Rivlin
- William L. Langer
- Walter Langer
- Wilmarth Lewis
- William Applebaum (Wolf)
- James McHugh
- Joseph Charles
- Richard Gard
- George H. Owen
- Edward T. Dickinson, Jr.
- Charlotte Gower (Chapman)
- Conyers Read
- Felix Gilbert
- Kermit Roosevelt Jr.
- Edward Hartshorne
- Carl Schorske
- Harold Deutsch
- C. Douglas Dillon
- Arthur H. Robinson
