= James Phinney Baxter III =

American historian (1893–1975)

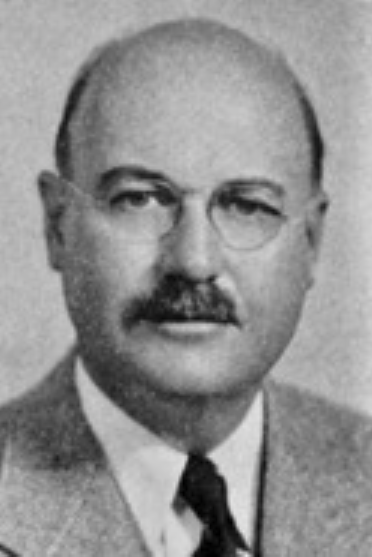

Chief of Research and Analysis Branch of OSS
- In office 1942–1943
- Preceded by: Himself
- Succeeded by: William L. Langer

Chief of Research and Analysis of COI
- In office 1941–1942
- Preceded by: Office Established
- Succeeded by: Office Abolished

10th President of Williams College
- In office 1937–1961
- Preceded by: Tyler Dennett
- Succeeded by: John Edward Sawyer

Personal details
- Born: February 15, 1893 Portland, Maine, U.S.
- Died: June 17, 1975 (aged 82) Williamstown, Massachusetts, U.S.
- Occupation: Historian, academic
- Awards: Pulitzer Prize for History (1947)

James Phinney Baxter III (February 15, 1893 in Portland, Maine – June 17, 1975 in Williamstown, Massachusetts) was an American historian, educator, and academic, who won the 1947 Pulitzer Prize for History for his book Scientists Against Time (1946). He was also the author of The Introduction of the Ironclad Warship (1933).

Baxter was the grandson of canning magnate, historian and mayor of Portland, Maine, James Phinney Baxter and the son of James Phinney Baxter Jr. He was a nephew of former Maine governor and philanthropist Percival Proctor Baxter. He attended Portland High School and Phillips Academy in Andover, Massachusetts, followed by Williams College, where he was graduated as valedictorian with Phi Beta Kappa honors, was a member of Kappa Alpha Society, and served as president of the Gargoyle Society. He obtained M.A. degrees from both Williams and Harvard University and his Ph.D. in history from Harvard in 1926.

Baxter taught at Colorado College and then at Harvard, progressing from instructor to full professor in 10 years. He served as the first master of Adams House. In 1928 he was elected a Fellow of the American Academy of Arts and Sciences. In 1937-1961 he was president of Williams College. Baxter left Williams during World War II while he served as research coordinator of information (1941–1943) and deputy director of the Office of Strategic Services (1942–1943). In 1943 he was the part-time official historian of the Office of Scientific Research and Development, where he wrote Scientists Against Time.

He was a member of the board of trustees of the World Peace Foundation. President Dwight Eisenhower appointed Baxter to the Gaither Commission.

Baxter III died in June 1975 and is buried beside his wife at the Williams College cemetery.
