= Enemy Objectives Unit =

Unit of OSS during WW2

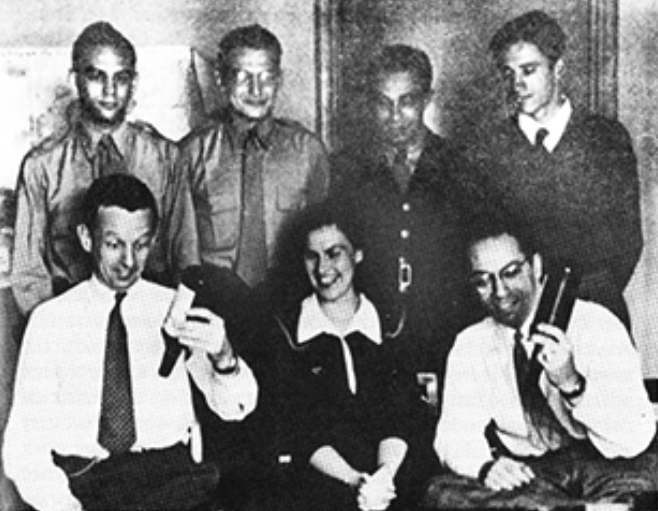
Some of the Enemy Objectives Unit around 1944 during their time off, doing something with bottles. Seated left to right: Charles Kindleberger, Roselene Honerkamp, Irwin Nat Pincus. Standing left to right: William Salant, Walt W. Rostow, Agent Selko, Edward Mayer.

The Enemy Objectives Unit (EOU) was formed in the United States during the Second World War to identify targets for strategic bombing in Nazi Germany. The team, consisting of economists, was one section within the Office of Strategic Services. Working within external guidelines, the unit used a systematic methodology to identify military and economic targets where air attack would be most effective. Although some of its recommendations proved flawed, it was credited as contributing to the Allied victory in the war.

== Creation of team ==
In June 1942, President Franklin Roosevelt set up the Office of Strategic Services or OSS, an intelligence group with a similar role to that of Britain’s Special Operations Executive. A subdivision of the OSS, called Research and Analysis (R&A), was composed of professors and scholars who were willing to contribute to the war. Within R&A a team of economists was formed under the name of the Enemy Objectives Unit. This unit used input/output models in recommending German targets to the Allied Eighth Air Force.

== Identifying targets ==
The aim of the EOU was expressed in the Casablanca directive given to British and American air forces following the Casablanca Conference of January 1943: "Your primary object will be the progressive destruction and dislocation of the German military, industrial and economic system, and the undermining of the morale of the German people to a part where their capacity for armed resistance is fatally weakened".

Recommendations were based on a system created by EOU officers taking into account such factors as depth, target system, and cushion. For depth the EOU considered whether the attack would go "deep" enough and how many different effects it would have. Target system determined whether the attack would create a chain reaction that would knock out many processes at once. Cushion related to the ability of the target to recover quickly from the attack. Conventional target factories, such those that produced weapons, tanks, and aircraft had developed methods of rapid recovery after being bombed and were considered to be less cost-effective for this reason. These three considerations helped the EOU to identify those targets where air attack would be most effective. The work of this group is often used as a case study in applied economics, in particular their suggestion to Allied commanders to destroy ball bearing factories, as their models showed them to be the most vital to Nazi industry. This particular recommendation turned out to be incorrect. For one thing, after the Second Raid on Schweinfurt the Nazis re-engineered many machines to use other methods of friction reduction.

== Casablanca and Pointblank ==
"Casablanca" and "Pointblank" were guidelines for the EOU in identifying priority targets. The Casablanca guidelines were used to select five categories of target:

1. Kriegsmarine, the German navy
2. Luftwaffe, German air force
3. Transportation, such as the Reichsbahn
4. Oil
5. Any other targets vital to the economy

The EOU proceeded to apply their methods within each category and try to choose the best targets. One point that this group underestimated was the effectiveness of bombing German oil refineries: they had correctly estimated the amount of stocks kept but failed to account for the methods the Germans would employ in the short term to conserve oil supplies. The later oil campaign of World War II is thought by many historians to be a substantial factor in Nazi defeat. As the war progressed, however, there was a call for a new plan, Pointblank directive. This plan set aside the five points from the Casablanca plan and instructed the EOU to target the German air force primarily, as this force was doing the most damage to the allies. The EOU proved to be a vital tool to the Allies’ air forces and helped them defeat the Germans in World War II.
