= Charles P. Kindleberger =

American economic historian

Charles Kindleberger
- Kindleberger ca.1973

Personal details
- Born: October 12, 1910 New York City, US
- Died: July 7, 2003 (aged 92) Cambridge, Massachusetts, US
- Spouse: Sarah Miles Kindleberger
- Children: 4, including Richard S. Kindleberger
- Education: BA University of Pennsylvania; PhD Columbia University
- Occupation: Economist
- Awards: Bronze Star, Legion of Merit

Military service
- Branch/service: Office of Strategic Services; United States Army
- Battles/wars: World War II

Charles Poor Kindleberger (October 12, 1910 – July 7, 2003) was an American economic historian and author of over 30 books. His 1978 book Manias, Panics, and Crashes, about speculative stock market bubbles, was reprinted in 2000 after the dot-com bubble. He is well known for his role in developing what would become hegemonic stability theory, arguing that a hegemonic power was needed to maintain a stable international monetary system. He has been referred to as "the master of the genre" on financial crisis by The Economist.

== Life ==
=== Background ===
Kindleberger was born in New York City on October 12, 1910. He graduated from the Kent School in 1928, the University of Pennsylvania in 1932, and received a PhD from Columbia University in 1937.

During the summer of 1931, he traveled to Europe and attended a seminar hosted by Salvador de Madariaga, but, when the latter was appointed Spanish Ambassador to the United States, Kindleberger attended lectures at the Graduate Institute of International Studies in Geneva led by Sir Alfred Zimmern.

=== Government ===
==== Treasury ====
While writing his thesis, Kindleberger was employed temporarily in the international division of United States Treasury under the direction of Harry Dexter White. He then joined the Federal Reserve Bank of New York full-time (1936–1939). Subsequently, he worked at the Bank for International Settlements in Switzerland (1939–1940), the Board of Governors of the Federal Reserve System (1940–1942).

==== World War II ====
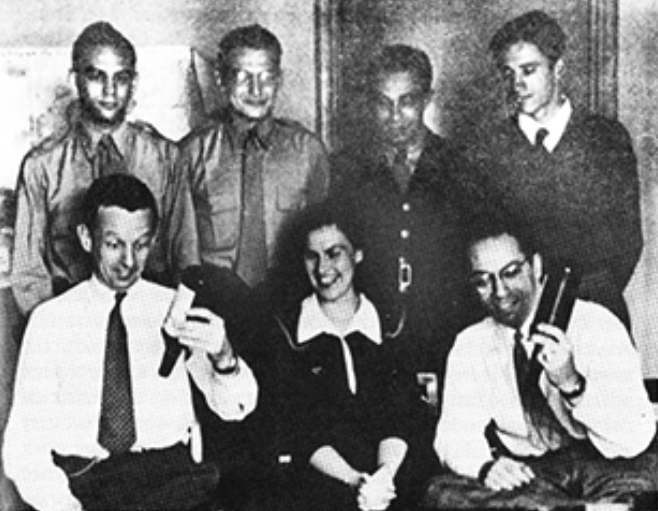
Some members of the Enemy Objectives Unit, during their time off, demonstrating turbulence and laminar flow. Seated left to right: Charles Kindleberger, Roselene Honerkamp, Irwin Nat Pincus. Standing left to right: William Salant, Walt W. Rostow, Agent Selko, Edward Mayer.

During World War II, he served in the Research and Analysis Branch (R&A) of the Office of Strategic Services (OSS). From February 27, 1943 to June 19, 1944, he commanded the Enemy Objectives Unit (EOU) at OSS/London, taking over this position from Chandler Morse, where he pioneered the American version of strategic bombing, which was to use on-the-ground intelligence to identify specific targets for destruction, built on the theory of air dominance written by Giulio Douhet. This greatly differed from the present British system here, which was to dominate the air by carpet bombing the objective. EOU identified viable German targets for destruction and was allowed, unlike other R&A branches, at OSS/London, to offer policy advice and guidance to military commanders. Kindleberger criticized the British system as being that of "all hammer and no anvil."

In June, 1944, Kindleberger was forward-deployed with the 12th US Army Group, an OSS Detachment embedded in the G-2 for General Edwin Sibert. He served here in the final stretch of the war, as the Army advanced deeper into Nazi Germany.

==== Marshall Plan ====
From 1945 to 1947 he was Chief of the Division of Economic Affairs of Germany and Austria at the United States Department of State.

Kindleberger was a leading architect of the Marshall Plan. In 1945–1947 he served at the Department of State as acting director of the Office of Economic Security Policy, and briefly from 1947 to 1948 as counselor for the European Recovery Program.

He described his around-the-clock work to develop and launch the Marshall Plan with singular passion in a 1973 interview:

We were conscious of a great sense of excitement about the plan. Marshall himself was a great, great man—funny, odd but great—Olympian in his moral quality. We'd stay up all night, night after night. The first work ever done that I know about in economics on computers used the Pentagon's computers at night for the Marshall Plan. I had a tremendous sense of gratification from working so hard on it.

==== Harry Dexter White ====
Though he himself was spared anti-communist investigation during the 1950s, he later recalled:

...I worked in the Treasury under Harry Dexter White. That gave me a lot of trouble later on because he got in trouble, and anybody who was infected by him got into trouble, too. The FBI listened to my phone calls and things I said in the course of my work at the State Department and gave gossip and some misrepresentations to columnists like George Sokolsky. J. Edgar Hoover fed them such gossip.

=== Academia ===
After 1948, Kindleberger was appointed Professor of International Economics at MIT. He retired from a full-time position in 1976 and continued as a senior lecturer until full retirement from teaching in 1981.

He partook in working groups of the Council on Foreign Relations. He later held the position of Ford International Professor of Economics at the Massachusetts Institute of Technology.

=== Honors ===
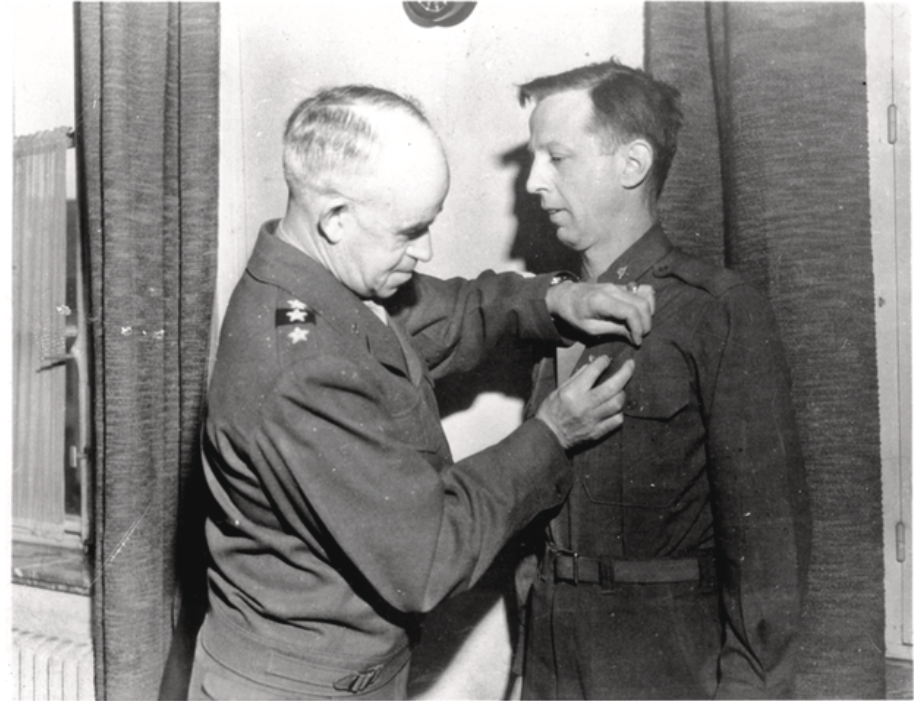
General Omar Bradley awards the Bronze Star to Captain Charles P. Kindleberger, 1944.

- 1944 Bronze Star
- 1945 Legion of Merit
- 1954 elected member of the American Academy of Arts and Sciences
- 1966 Dr. h.c., University of Paris
- 1977 Dr. h.c., University of Ghent
- 1978 Harms Prize, Institut für Weltwirtschaft, Kiel
- 1984 Dr. Sci. h.c., University of Pennsylvania
- 1987 elected member of the American Philosophical Society
- 1989 Bicentennial Medal, Georgetown University

=== Personal ===
Kindleberger was married to Sarah Miles Kindleberger for 59 years. They had four children: Charles P. Kindleberger III, Richard S. Kindleberger (a reporter for the Boston Globe), Sarah Kindleberger, and E. Randall Kindleberger.

He died of a stroke on July 7, 2003, in Cambridge, Massachusetts.

== Work ==
Kindleberger wrote 30 books: International Short-Term Capital Movements in 1937, and the others beginning in 1950.

As an economic historian, Kindleberger used a narrative approach to knowledge, not based on mathematical models. In the preface to The Great Depression 1929-1939, he wrote: "It's the story simply told, without tables of squares..."

His book Manias, Panics, and Crashes is still widely used in Master of Business Administration (MBA) programs in the United States.

=== Hegemonic stability theory ===
In his 1973 and 1986 book The World in Depression 1929–1939, Kindleberger advances an idiosyncratic, internationalist view of the causes and nature of the Great Depression, which concludes that a world hegemon is necessary for a generally stable world economy. Blaming the peculiar length and depth of the Depression on the hesitancy of the US in taking over leadership of the world economy when Britain was no longer up to the role after World War I, he concludes that "for the world economy to be stabilized, there has to be a stabilizer—one stabilizer", by which, in the context of the interwar years at least, he means the United States. In the last chapter, "An Explanation of the 1929 Depression", Kindleberger lists the five responsibilities the US would have had to assume in order to stabilize the world economy:

1. maintaining a relatively open market for distress goods;
2. providing countercyclical, or at least stable, long-term, lending;
3. policing the relative stability of exchange rates;
4. ensuring the coordination of nations' macroeconomic policies;
5. acting as a lender of last resort by discounting, or otherwise providing liquidity, in a financial crisis.

Kindleberger was highly skeptical of Milton Friedman and Anna Schwartz's monetarist view of the causes of the Depression, seeing it as too narrow and perhaps dogmatic, and dismisses out of hand what he characterized as Paul Samuelson's "accidental" or "fortuitous" interpretation. The World in Depression was praised by John Kenneth Galbraith as "the best book on the subject".

For Kindleberger, the main problem with international institutions is that they provide public goods whose provision states are incentivized to free-ride on. Following Mancur Olson, Kindleberger argued that the solution to the free-riding problem was to have an actor who was large enough (a hegemon) and willing to bear the cost of cooperation alone.

=== Kindleberger's studies on corporate power and beyond ===
Beyond his hegemonic stability theory, Kindleberger was a prolific writer on a range of issues such as the power of multinational corporations, the role international financial systems and tax havens play in the global economy, and other issues pertaining to ”the politics of international economics”.

Exemplifying these tendencies, in his Power and Money, Kindleberger provided prolific analyses on the tax avoidance and tax evasion strategies of multinational corporations, also utilizing secretive tax havens like the Bahamas or Switzerland. Notably, Kindleberger also supervised the PhD thesis of Stephen Hymer, whose work established the discipline of International Business studies, with its focus on studying the agency of multinational corporations.

=== Books ===
- International Short-term Capital Movements (NY: Columbia University Press, 1937)
- International Economics (Irwin, 1953)
- Economic Development (New York, 1958)
- Foreign Trade and the National Economy (Yale, 1962)
- Europa and the Dollar (Cambridge, Massachusetts, London, 1966)
- Europe's Postwar Growth. The Role of Labor Supply (Cambridge, Massachusetts, 1967)
- American Business Abroad (New Haven, London, 1969)
- Power and Money: The Economics of International Politics and the Politics of International Economics (Macmillan and co, London)
- The Benefits of International Money. Journal of International Economics 2 (Nov. 1972): 425–442.
- The World in Depression: 1929–1939 (University of California Press, 1973); Kindleberger, Charles P. (1986). revised and enlarged edition. University of California Press. ISBN 9780520055926.
- Manias, Panics, and Crashes: A History of Financial Crises (Macmillan, 1978)
- Historical Economics – Art or Science? (1990) (online book)
- A Financial History of Western Europe (New York, 1984)
- World Economic Primacy: 1500 – 1990 (Oxford University Press, 1996)
- Centralization versus Pluralism (Copenhagen Business School Press, 1996)
- Economic Laws and Economic History (Cambridge University Press, 1997)

== See also ==
- Kindleberger Trap, theory developed by Joseph Nye.
