= Ernst Paul =

German politician and journalist

- Born: 27 April 1897; Steindorf (now Kamenec), Czechoslovakia
- Died: 11 June 1978 (aged 81); Gallspach, Austria
- Occupations: Politician, journalist

Ernst Paul (1897–1978) was a Sudeten German Social Democratic politician and journalist.

== Youth ==
Paul was born on 27 April 1897 in Steindorf, Bohemia, the son of Anton Paul and Anna Paul (née Tampe). His father was a weaver and the family lived in poverty. He attended volksschule in Riegersdorf 1903–1908. Between 1908 and 1911 he attended bürgerschule in Eulau.

After leaving school, Paul worked as a typesetter apprentice 1911–1915. Paul's mother died in 1912. In the same year he joined the Young Workers League of Austria. He became a SDAPÖ member in 1913.

== World War I ==
During World War I he served as corporal in the Austro-Hungarian army. He fought at the Battles of the Isonzo and on the Eastern Front in Galicia, Bukovina and Romania. He was awarded a Medal for Bravery.

== In Czechoslovakia ==
After his military service, he became a member of the German Social Democratic Workers Party in the Czechoslovak Republic (DSAP). He took part in founding of the Social Democratic Workers Youth League and served as chairman until 1920. In 1920 he moved to Teplitz-Schönau. Between 1920 and 1926 he served as chairman of the Socialist Youth League. He took part in the founding of the Socialist Youth International, and served as a member of its bureau between 1923 and 1932. In 1924 he moved to Prague. Between 1925 and 1938 he served as editor of the Prague-based newspaper Der Sozialdemokrat ('The Social Democrat'). In 1930 he was named Educational Secretary of the party, later being named Central Secretary of DSAP. He served as vice chairman of the German Popular Education Institute. Moreover, Paul led the paramilitary wing of the party, Republikanische Bürgerwehr.

== Years in exile ==
At the time of the signing of the Munich Agreement, Paul was visiting Sweden. He stayed in Sweden in exile to avoid arrest back home. Paul lived in Stockholm from 1938 to 1948. He functioned as the leader of Sudeten German exiles in Sweden. 1941–1942 he went to London to negotiate with the Czechoslovak government-in-exile president Edvard Beneš on the future of the Sudeten Germans. He took part in forming the International Group of Democratic Socialists in Stockholm in 1942. His Czechoslovak citizenship was withdrawn in 1943 by the government-in-exile, rendering Paul stateless.

== In West Germany ==
In 1948 Paul moved to the West German town of Esslingen am Neckar. He served as editor-in-chief of the SPD organ in Baden Württemberg, Allgemeine Zeitung in Stuttgart/Mannheim, 1949–1951. He was a Bundestag member 1949–1969. He was part of the West German delegation to the Parliamentary Assembly of the Council of Europe 1956–1967. Moreover, he was a delegate to the assembly of the Western European Union.

Paul died on 11 June 1978 in Gallspach, Austria. He was buried in Esslingen am Neckar on 16 June 1978.
