= Richard Kindleberger =

- Born: Richard Stockton Kindleberger; June 17, 1942; Baltimore, Maryland, US
- Died: January 1, 2010 (aged 67); Cambridge, Massachusetts, US
- Occupations: reporter and editor
- Years active: 1967–2010
- Spouse: Sarah Wells (1978–1990; her death) 2 children

Richard Kindleberger (June 17, 1942 – January 1, 2010) was an American newspaper reporter and editor who worked at The Boston Globe.

== Early life ==
Richard Kindleberger was born in Baltimore, Maryland, in 1942, and raised in Lincoln, Massachusetts. He had two sisters and one brother. His father, Charles P. Kindleberger, was an economist at M.I.T. and an architect of the Marshall Plan. In 1960, Richard graduated from Lincoln-Sudbury Regional High School. He developed an interest for languages and learned Russian, French, German, and Spanish.

After graduating from Cornell University in 1967, he worked as a reporter at the Worcester Evening Gazette for almost 3 years. Kindleberger later received a master's degree in Russian literature.

Kindleberger was hired by The Boston Globe, where he began working as an environmental reporter and a copy editor beginning in 1972. He joined a spotlight team and helped investigate reports on abuse in the Massachusetts civil service system and the Portsmouth Naval Shipyard.

== Personal life ==
On 1978, Kindleberger married Sarah Wells and later had two daughters named Kate and Carrie Kindleberger. The couple were married for more than 12 years until Sarah died from cancer. After three years he married his second wife, Jean Hale.

== Death ==
After spending at least thirty years as a reporter and editor, Kindleberger died from a brain tumor on January 1, 2010, at his home in Cambridge, Massachusetts, at the age of 67.
