= Harold C. Deutsch =

American military historian

Harold Charles Deutsch (June 7, 1904 – May 15, 1995) was an American military historian who focused on World War II. During the Second World War, he served as head of research for the Office of Strategic Services.

== Life ==
Deutsch was born in Milwaukee, Wisconsin. He was a graduate of the University of Wisconsin (B.A., M.A.) and Harvard University (M.A., Ph.D.). In Europe he studied at the University of Paris, the University of Vienna and the University of Berlin. He was a professor of history at the University of Minnesota. Deutsch joined the US Army War College's Strategic Studies Institute as a political scientist. During the Second World War he was chief of the Political Subdivision for Europe, Africa, and the Middle East of the Office of Strategic Services.

== Works ==
- Deutsch, Harold C., and Dennis E. Showalter What If: The Might-Have-Beens of World War II Chicago, Ill: Emperor's Press, 1997.
- Deutsch, Harold C., and Dennis E. Showalter. If the Allies Had Fallen: Sixty Alternate Scenarios of World War II. New York: Skyhorse Publishing, Inc, 2012.
- Deutsch, Harold C. Hitler and His Generals: The Hidden Crisis, January–June 1938. Minneapolis, Minn: University of Minnesota Press, 1974.
- The Conspiracy Against Hitler in the Twilight War
- Hitler and His Generals: The Hidden Crisis, January–June 1938, 1974
- The Historical Impact of Revealing The Ultra Secret, 1977
- The Influence of ULTRA on World War II, 1978
- The Genesis of Napoleonic Imperialism, Harvard University Press (1938).
