= E Street Complex =

Historical site in Washington, D.C.

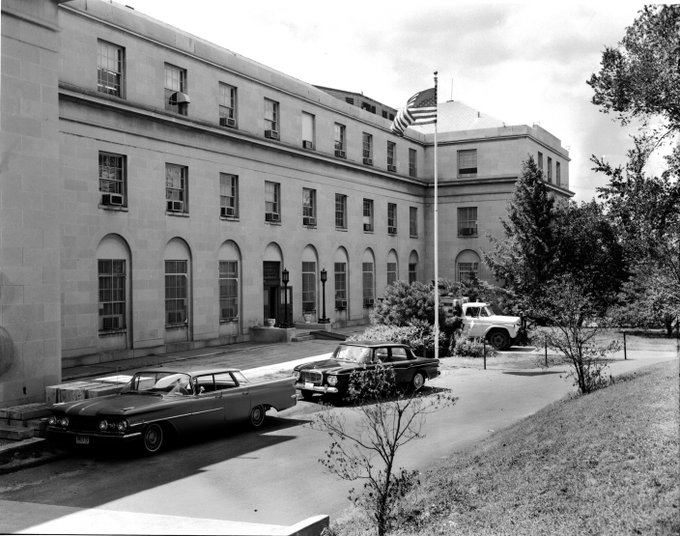
- Interactive map of the E Street Complex area

General information
- Location: 2430 E St NW, Foggy Bottom, Washington, D.C.
- Coordinates: 38.895643722054366°N 77.05055461126634°W
- Owner: United States Government

Design and construction
- Awards and prizes: National Register of Historic Places

The E Street Complex, also known as the Navy Hill Complex, the Potomac Hill Complex, the Observatory Hill Complex, and the Pickle Factory, is a historic site in Washington, D.C. that served as the primary headquarters facility of the Office of Strategic Services (OSS), headquarters of the Central Intelligence Group (CIG), and the first headquarters building and birthplace of the Central Intelligence Agency (CIA). It is geographically located near 23rd Street and E Street, adjacent to the Old Naval Observatory site. This complex was unassuming, appearing to be a mix of normal government offices and apartment buildings to nearby residents and office workers.

The OSS Society and State Department engaged in efforts with the National Park Service to add the E Street Complex to the National Register of Historic Places (NRHP). On January 12, 2017, the effort was successful when the Observatory Hill Historic District was listed on the NRHP.

The CIA was headquartered here from its birth in 1947 until 1961, when it outgrew the facility and moved across the river to the George Bush Center for Intelligence.
