= John Magruder =

John Magruder may refer to:

- John Magruder (United States Army officer, born 1887) (1887–1958), Brigadier general in the United States Army
- John B. Magruder (1807–1871), military, in United States Army, Confederacy and Imperial Mexican Army
- John H. Magruder III, United States Marine Corps officer

== See also ==
- Magruder, a surname
