= California Department of Education Headquarters =

Coordinates: 38.574°N 121.489°W

The California Department of Education Headquarters (CDEH), known also as Block 225, is a component of the Capitol Area East End Complex in Sacramento, CA. The building achieved a LEED Silver rating in 1999, and later achieved LEED Gold in 2003, only the second LEED Gold building in California at the time. Following a further cultivation in operations and maintenance, the building eventually achieved a LEED EB Platinum rating, the second largest EB Platinum rating in the world.

== Design ==
Taking the fast track under design-build — the first design-build office building in California's history — Block 225 finished 10 months ahead of the class schedule. Designed by Curtis W. Fentress, FAIA, RIBA of Fentress Architects, the CDEH/Block 225 consolidated the headquarters of the Department of Education, which formerly occupied several facilities located throughout Sacramento. The six-story, 461,000-gross-square-foot building houses offices for the state employees and a nonprofit childcare facility, for a total of about 1,350 occupants.

The building is the largest office campus ever undertaken by the California Department of General Services. As a result of its extraordinary green qualities and its successful design-build delivery, it has become a benchmark for all future California public projects in this complex and around the State.
