= Dubai Mixed-Use Towers =

General information
- Status: Topped-out
- Type: Mixed Use
- Location: Dubai, United Arab Emirates
- Construction started: 2007
- Completed: 2013
- Owner: H.H. Saeed Bin Zayed Al Nahyan

Height
- Antenna spire: 200 metres (656 ft)

Technical details
- Floor count: 53 storey Hotel Tower; 61 Storey Residential Tower

Design and construction
- Architect: Fentress Architects
- Main contractor: Arabian Construction Company(Acc); MAPCO L.L.C (Sub-Contractor)

The Dubai Mixed-Use Towers, also referred to as the Dancing Sisters (and nicknamed the Spice Girls in reference to both Dubai’s role in the spice trade and the musicality of the design) consists of a 53 storey hotel tower and a 61 storey residential tower located adjacent to Burj Khalifa in Downtown Dubai, Dubai, United Arab Emirates. The towers rise over 200 metres (656 ft), one convex, one concave, and comprise 2,297,800 square feet (213,470 m^{2}) of mixed use space, including a five star Biltmore Hotel Suites Tower, 250 luxury rental residences with services and amenities, prime corporate office space, conference centers, retail shops, restaurants, hospitality and entertainment areas.

== See also ==
- List of tallest buildings in Dubai
- List of tallest buildings in the United Arab Emirates
