= National Museum of the Marine Corps =

Museum in Triangle, Virginia, United States

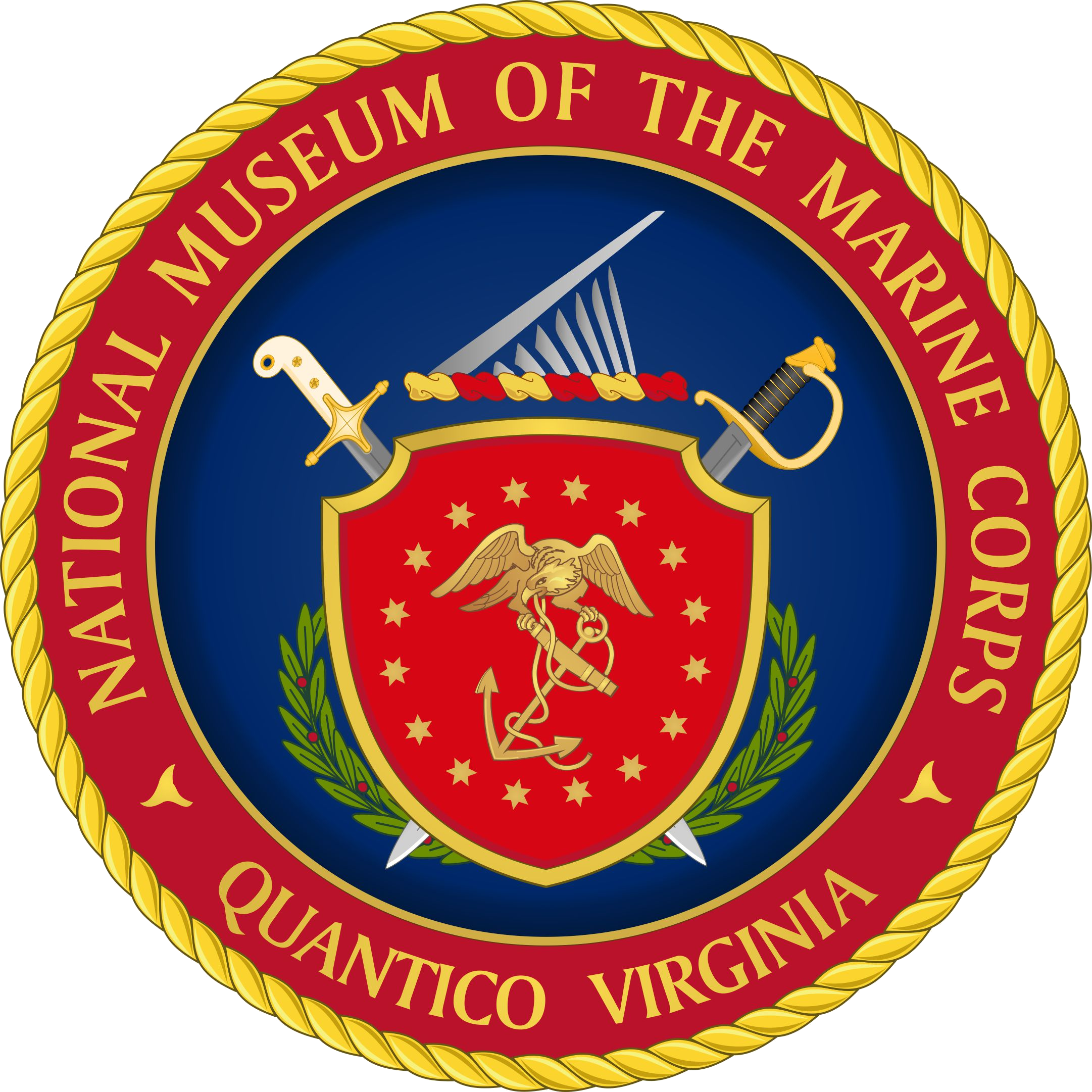

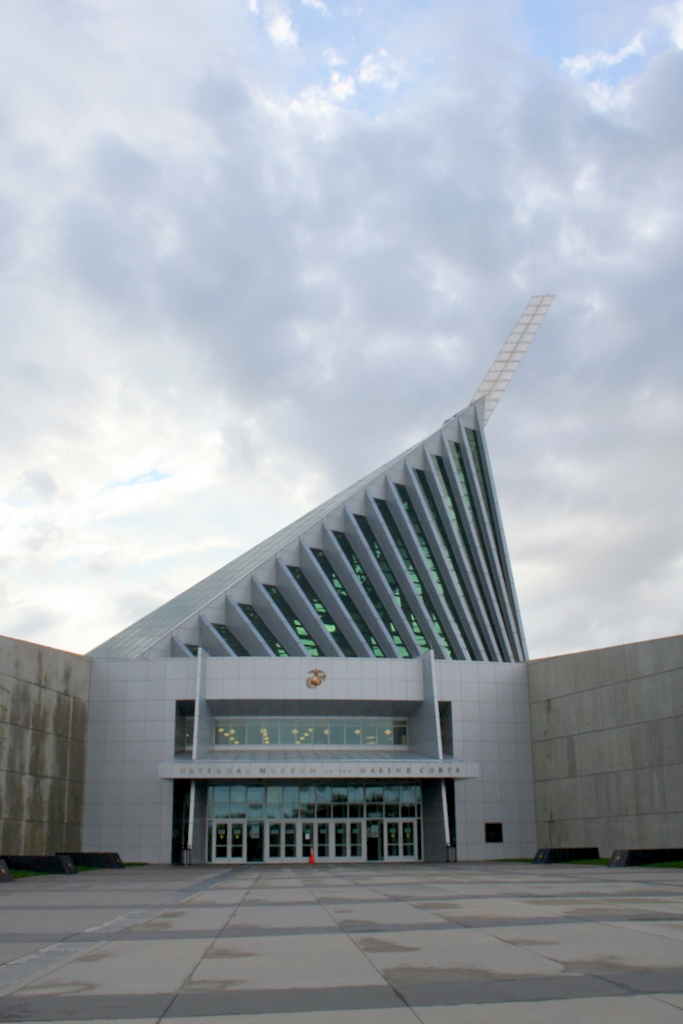
- The exterior of the National Museum of the Marines Corps in 2010
- Established: November 10, 2006
- Location: 1775 Semper Fidelis Way, Triangle, Virginia, U.S.
- Coordinates: 38°32′39″N 77°20′36″W
- Type: Military History
- Public transit access: none
- Website: usmcmuseum.com

The National Museum of the Marine Corps is the historical museum of the United States Marine Corps. Located in Triangle, Virginia near Marine Corps Base Quantico, the museum opened on November 10, 2006, and is now one of the top tourist attractions in the state, drawing over 500,000 people annually.

In July 2013, the museum announced plans for a major expansion, to include sections on more modern Marine Corps history, such as the 1983 Beirut barracks bombing, a combat art gallery, and a Global War on Terrorism gallery.

== Background ==
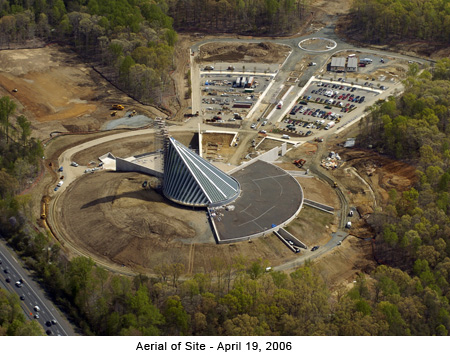
Aerial view of the museum under construction in April 2006

The museum replaces both the Marine Corps Historical Center in the Washington Navy Yard, which closed on July 1, 2005, and the Marine Corps Air-Ground Museum in Quantico, Virginia, which closed on November 15, 2002.

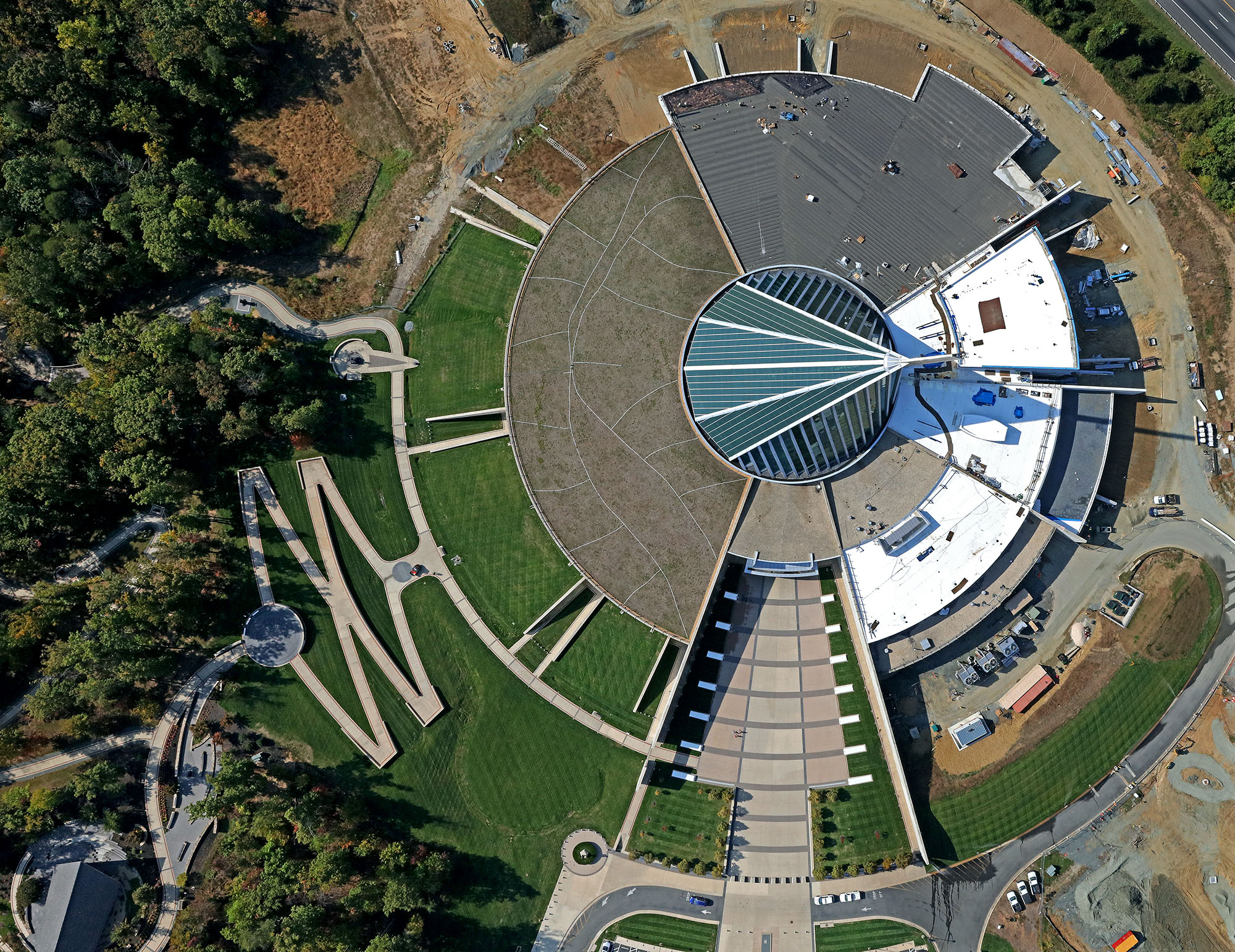
Aerial view of the museum

A public-private venture, the museum is a cooperative effort between the United States Marine Corps and the Marine Corps Heritage Foundation. The Foundation manages the museum operation, while the museum building will be donated to the Marine Corps.

Designed by Curtis W. Fentress of Fentress Architects, the museum's exterior is meant to "evoke the image of the flag raisers of Iwo Jima," an image that is also preserved by the Marine Corps War Memorial. A replica of the "Iron Mike" statue at Marine Corps Base Quantico stands on the lawn, to one side of the main entrance.

The museum is 100,000-square-foot (9,300 m^{2}), and is open to the public with free admission.

== Marine Corps Heritage Foundation ==
Established in 1979, the Marine Corps Heritage Foundation is a private, non-profit organization that supports the historical programs of the Marine Corps. In 1999, the Foundation expanded its mission to include the creation of the National Museum of the Marine Corps.

=== Heritage Center ===
The National Museum of the Marine Corps is designed to be the centerpiece of a complex of facilities called the Marine Corps Heritage Center. This multi-use, 135-acre (0.55 km^{2}) campus includes the Semper Fidelis Memorial Park and Semper Fidelis Chapel; a demonstration area with parade grounds; hiking trails and other outdoor recreational offerings; a conference center and hotel; and an archive facility to restore and preserve Marine artifacts.

The chapel, designed by Fentress Architects, was completed in 2009 with a $5 million donation from a retired Marine.

== Exhibits ==
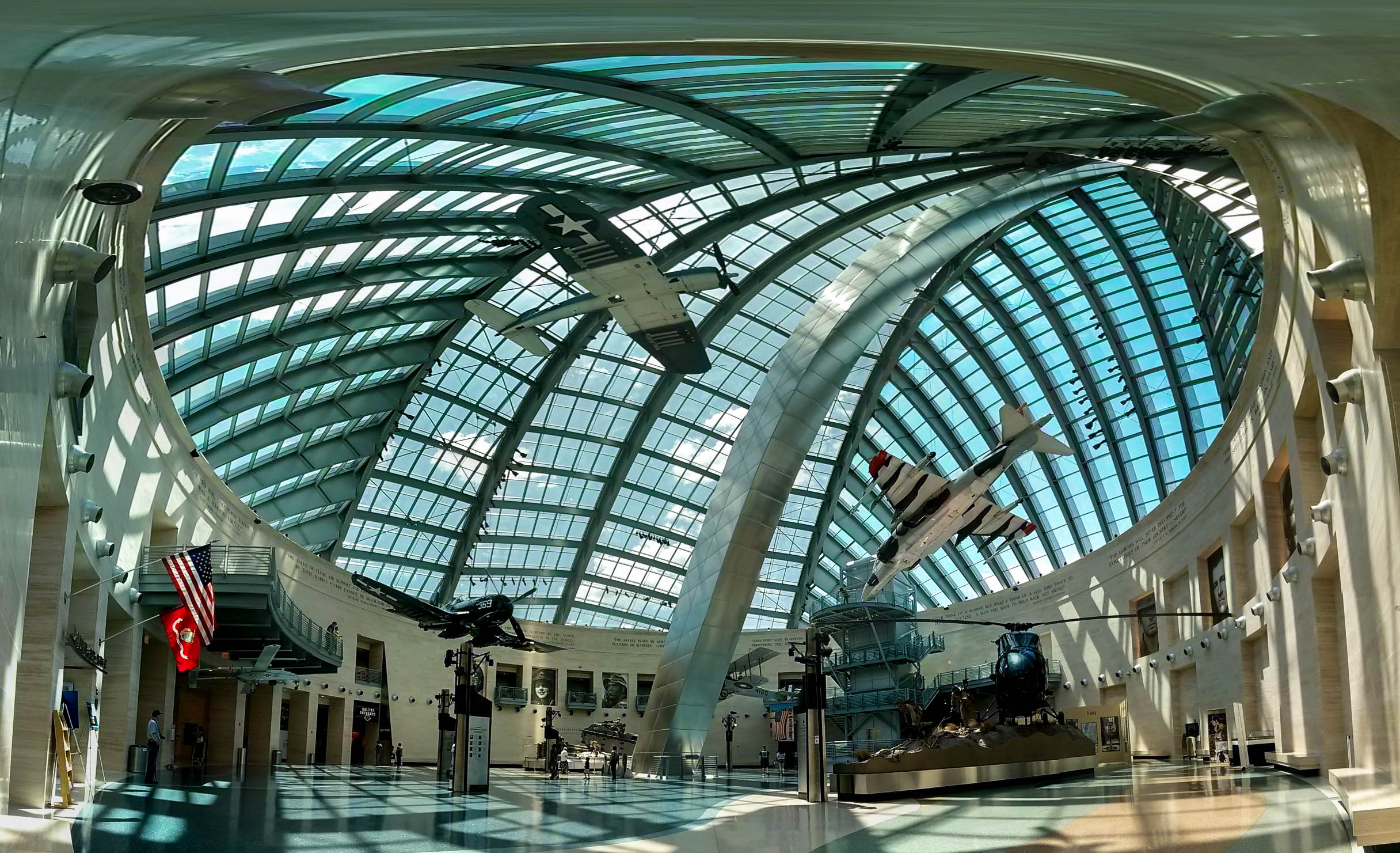
Photosphere of the Leatherneck Gallery

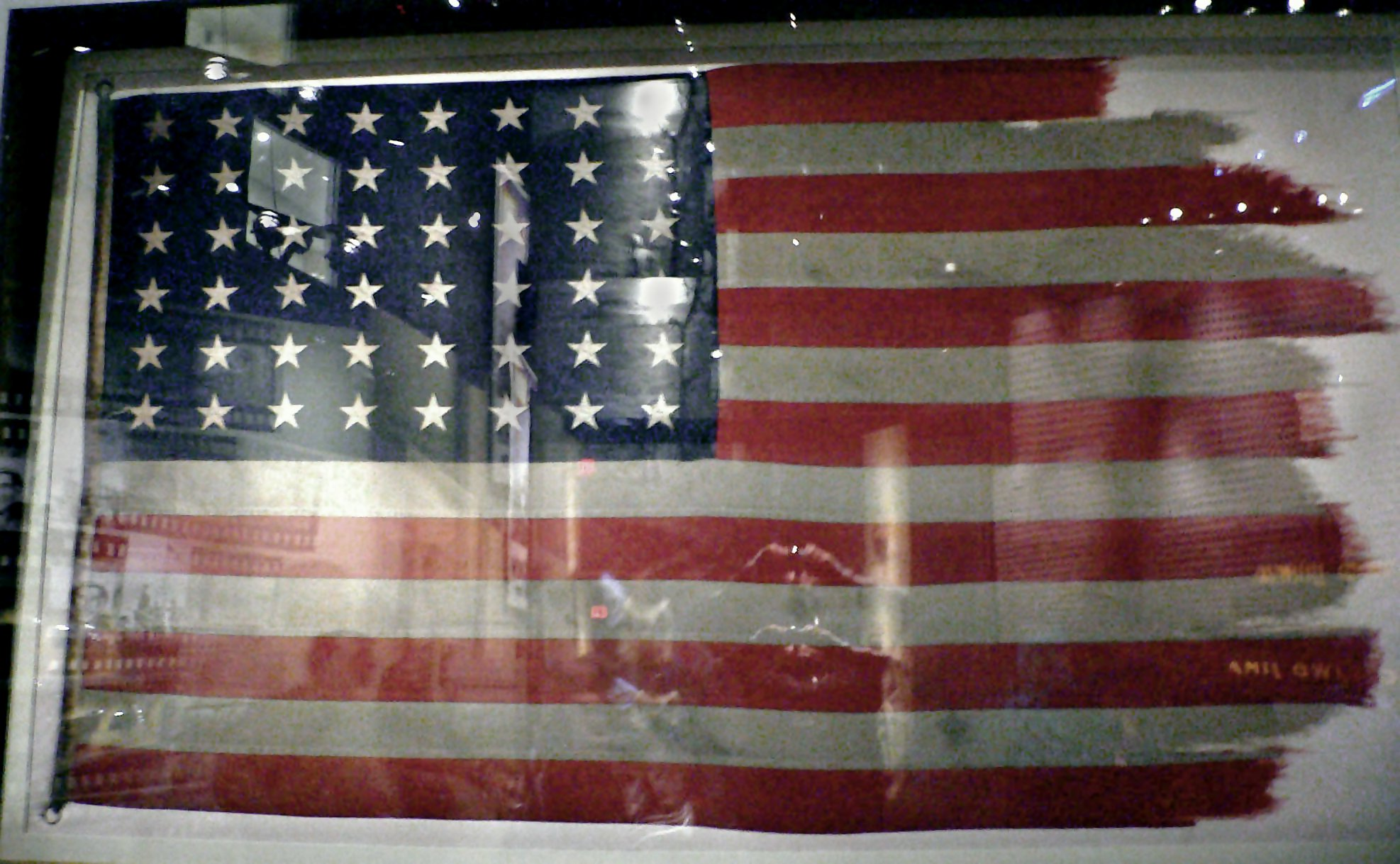
The museum exhibits the flags from the first and second Iwo Jima flag-raisings. The second flag, pictured in the iconic 1945 photograph, was damaged by the high winds at the peak of Mount Suribachi, Iwo Jima.

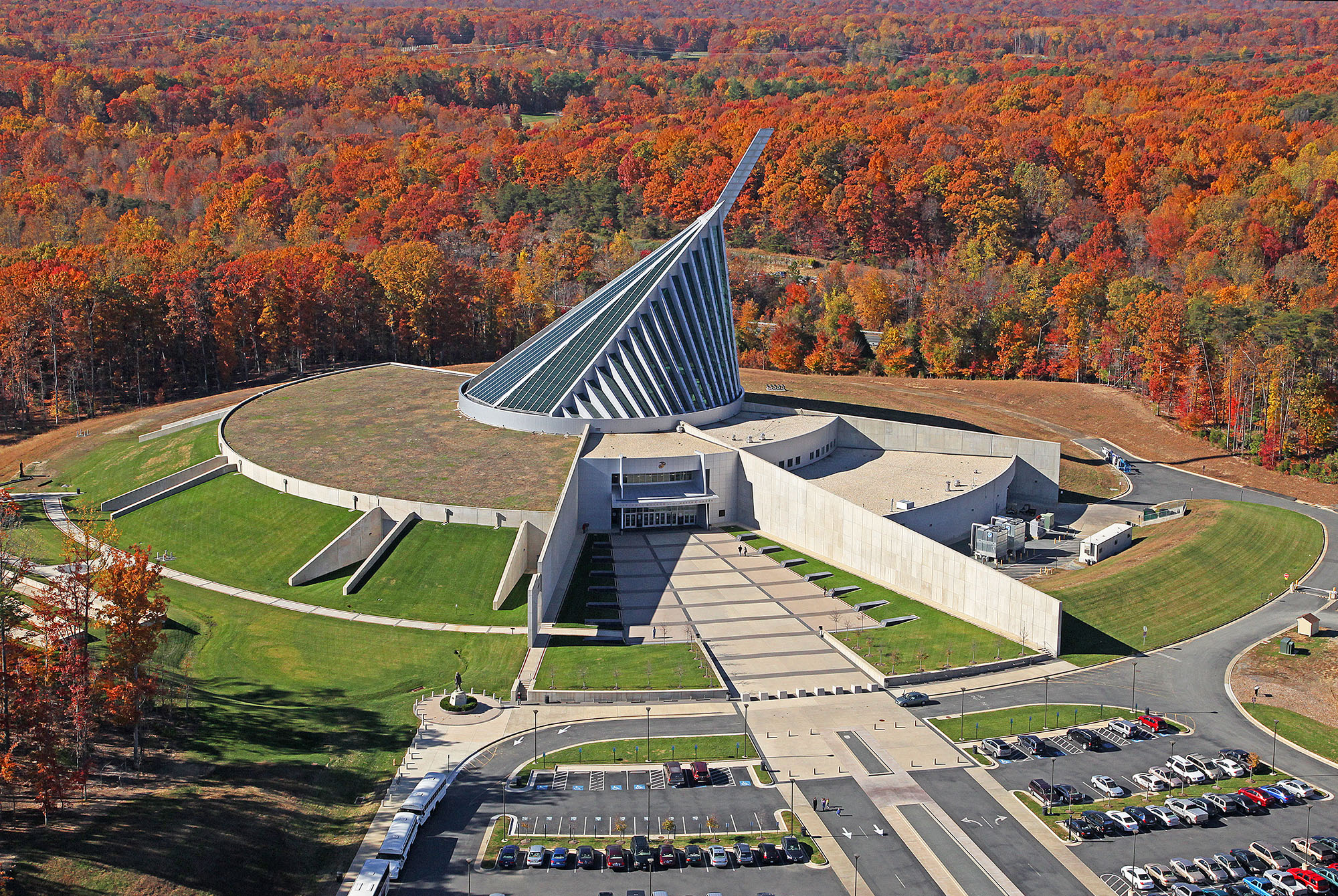
National Museum of the Marine Corps

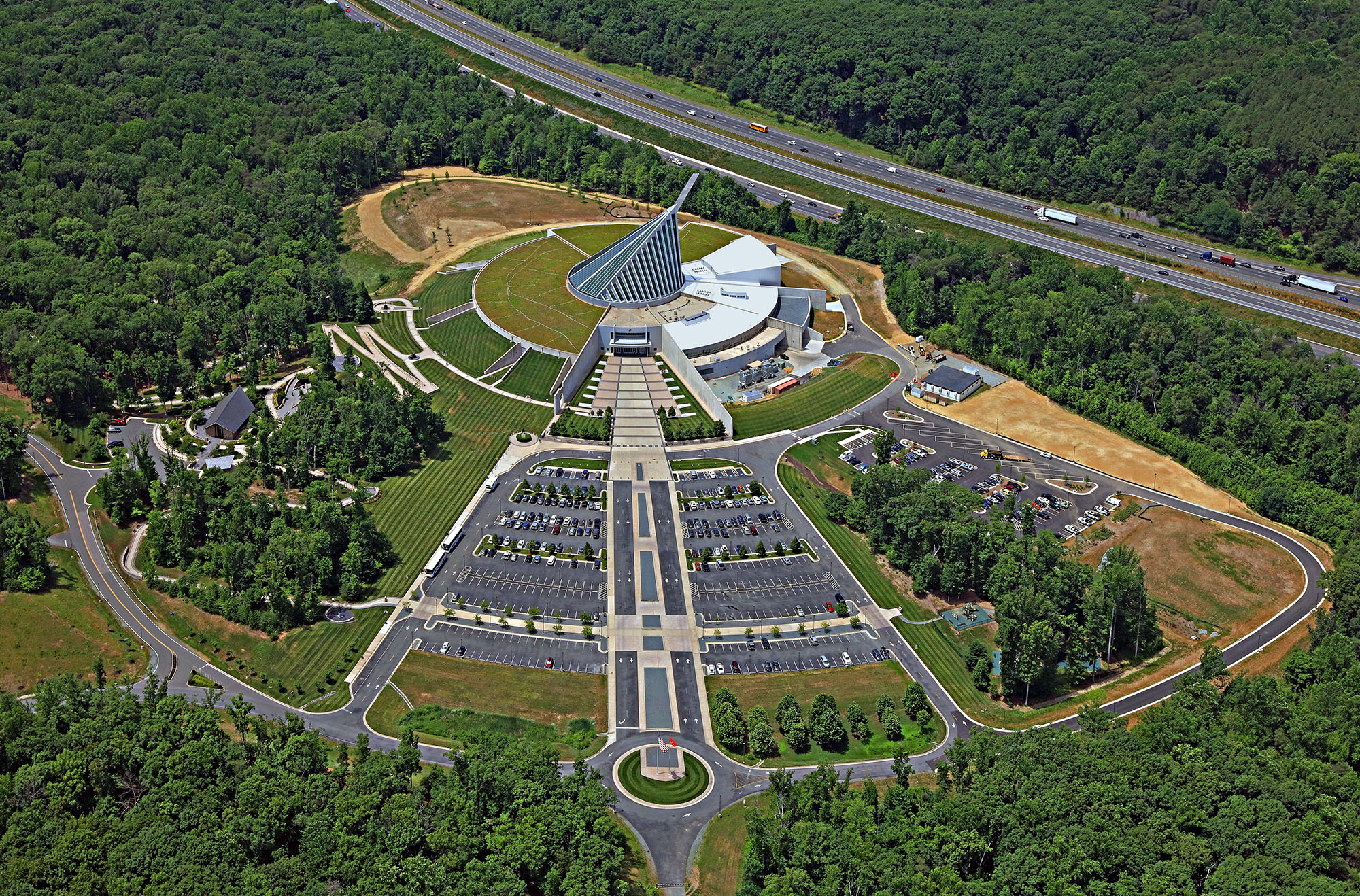
National Museum of the Marine Corps, looking southwest

The museum features the following permanent exhibits, which were designed by Christopher Chadbourne and Associates:

- Leatherneck Gallery
- Legacy Walk
- Making Marines
- World War II
- Korean War
- Vietnam War

On June 5, 2010, the following three exhibits were opened:

- Defending a New Nation (1775–1865)
- Age of Expansion (1866–1916)
- World War I (1917–1918)

On October 6, 2024, the Final Phase of the museum opened. The exhibit includes Marine Corps history from 1976 to the present, and covers Desert Storm, humanitarian missions, Iraq, and Afghanistan.

It also has a statue of a horse, Sergeant Reckless, which served with the Marine Corps in Korea. The statue was dedicated on Friday, 26 July 2013.

The museum also includes classrooms, a theater, a gift shop, a bar, a restaurant, and a rifle range laser simulator. The Korean War gallery features a section that simulates the cold temperature and sounds of the Battle of the Chosin Reservoir in 1951, while the war's fighting was at its peak. Two play areas for children can also be found within the museum.

== See also ==
- Coast Guard Heritage Museum
- Coast Guard Museum Northwest
- History of the United States Marine Corps
- List of maritime museums in the United States
- Category:Marine Corps museums in the United States
- National Museum of the United States Navy
- National Museum of the United States Air Force
- National Museum of the United States Army
- War in the Pacific National Historical Park
