= National Defense Authorization Act for Fiscal Year 2023 =

United States federal law

James M. Inhofe National Defense Authorization Act for Fiscal Year 2023
- Long title: An Act to authorize appropriations for fiscal year 2023 for military activities of the Department of Defense, for military construction, and for defense activities of the Department of Energy, to prescribe military personnel strengths for such fiscal year, and for other purposes.
- Acronyms (colloquial): NDAA
- Enacted by: the 117th United States Congress

Citations
- Public law: Pub. L. 117–263 (text) (PDF)
- Statutes at Large: 136 Stat. 2395

Legislative history
- Introduced in the House as H.R. 7776 (Water Resources Development Act of 2022) by Peter DeFazio (D–OR) on May 16, 2022; Committee consideration by House Committee on Transportation and Infrastructure; Passed the House on June 8, 2022 (384–37); Passed the Senate on July 28, 2022 (93–1) with amendment; House agreed to Senate amendment on December 8, 2022 (350–80) with further amendment; Senate agreed to House amendment on December 15, 2022 (83–11); Signed into law by President Joe Biden on December 23, 2022

The James M. Inhofe National Defense Authorization Act for Fiscal Year 2023 (NDAA 2023) is a United States federal law which specifies the budget, expenditures and policies of the U.S. Department of Defense (DOD) for fiscal year 2023. Analogous NDAAs have been passed annually for over 60 years.

== History ==
The House bill H.R. 7900 was passed on July 14, 2022. Hearings on the Senate amendment in the House Committee on Rules were scheduled for December 4. On December 6, a political agreement was reached between the leaders of the Senate Armed Services Committee and House Armed Services Committee. President Biden signed and enacted H.R. 7776 on December 23, 2022. In his signing statement, Biden expressed reservations about restrictions on the transfer of Guantánamo Bay detainees, the potential infringement on the president's constitutional authority regarding national security and sensitive intelligence information, and limitations on the president's discretion in foreign policy and international negotiations.

== Provisions ==
Military funding authorized by the bill includes:

- Full funding of the Ford-class carriers
- Full funding of the Columbia-class ballistic missile submarines

Versions of the legislation expanded the Selective Service System (military draft) to females, but it was cut in the final bill.

The NDAA requires the secretary of defense to rescind the directive, implemented in August 2022, that members of the U.S. armed forces be vaccinated against COVID-19. During the period the requirement was in effect, 98% of active duty service members and 96% of all service members had been vaccinated. The bill does not require reinstatement for personnel previously ejected for non-compliance with the order.

Section 583 of this NDAA authorizes the president to posthumously promote Ulysses S. Grant to the grade of General of the Armies of the United States, equal to the rank and precedence held by both George Washington on July 4, 1976 and General John J. Pershing in and after 1919 (41 Stat. 283, ch. 56).

=== Unidentified flying objects (UFOs) ===
The NDAA and its Intelligence Authorization Act (IAA) includes provisions for reporting of unidentified flying objects (UFOs), otherwise known as unidentified aerial phenomena or UAPs, including whistleblower protections and exemptions to nondisclosure orders and agreements (i.e. 50 U.S.C. § 3373b). It also requires the military to review UFO sightings back to 1945.

Language on the topic of UAP was also included in the previous 2022 NDAA (e.g. 50 U.S.C. § 3373), the Intelligence Authorization Act for Fiscal Year 2022 (e.g. 50 U.S.C. § 3373a), as well as an accompanying Senate Select Committee on Intelligence report for the Intelligence Authorization Act for Fiscal Year 2021 (i.e. S. Rept. 116-233).

=== BURMA Act of 2022 ===
This included the Burma Unified through Rigorous Military Accountability Act of 2022 (BURMA Act of 2022). The Act aims to restore democracy and address human rights violations in the country through sanctions on leaders of the Myanmar military (Tatmadaw), members of the State Administrative Council (SAC) which was chaired by the commander-in-chief of the military, military-affiliated business entities, conglomerates and state-owned enterprises such as the Myanmar Oil Gas Enterprise (MOGE) – which are the revenue sources of the military and the operational sources to military materials. The sanctions additionally include freezing of assets held in the United States' banks, foreign exchange transactions, and travel bans on individuals for their entry to the United States. It also includes supporting pro-democracy groups, such as the National Unity Government (NUG), and providing different types of assistance to strengthen federalism and non-lethal assistance for ethnic armed organizations (EAOs). The provision of humanitarian assistance for refugees, internally displaced persons, and victims of violence is also mentioned to be continued. The Act provides the president with additional discretionary authority to make policy changes with respect to Myanmar and enables the secretary of state to assist civilian and international entities with identifying and documenting war crimes, crimes against humanity, and genocide in Myanmar.

In response, the Burmese junta issued a statement dubbing the legislation an interference in Myanmar's internal affairs, and encroachment on the country's sovereignty. The government of the People's Republic of China also increased diplomatic efforts to engage ethnic armed organizations and the junta to protect their business and geopolitical interests.

=== Taiwan Enhanced Resilience Act ===
The included Taiwan Enhanced Resilience Act contains provisions for increased military aid and security cooperation. The legislation and a recent visit by the speaker of the US House of Representatives are said to have triggered large military exercises near Taiwan.

=== Aqua Alert Act ===
The Aqua Alert Act was attached as an amendment to the NDAA by Congressman Dean Phillips of Minnesota in July 2022. Similar to an Amber alert system, this amendment grants the Coast Guard the ability to create an electronic notification system with the purpose of notifying the public so that they can render aid in searches for distressed individuals on waterways.

=== CCP leadership wealth report ===
Inserted by Marco Rubio, section 6501 of the NDAA mandated the director of national intelligence produce a public "Report on wealth and corrupt activities of the leadership of the Chinese Communist Party" within one year. The release of the report was subsequently postponed. The report was released in March 2025.

== See also ==
- James M. Inhofe – American politician (1934–2024)
- National Museum of Intelligence and Special Operations, specific museum named in the act
