= Curtis Fentress =

American architect

- Born: 1947 (age 78–79); Greensboro, North Carolina, U.S.
- Occupation: Architect
- Known for: Architect, design
- Notable work: Denver International Airport, Colorado Convention Center, Incheon International Airport, Arraya Tower, National Museum of the Marine Corps
- Awards: More than 400 Awards for Innovation and Design Excellence

Curtis Worth Fentress FAIA RIBA (born 1947) is an American architect. He is currently the principal-in-charge of design at Fentress Architects, an international design studio he founded in Denver, Colorado in 1980.

Fentress' work on Denver International Airport, Incheon International Airport and his modernization of Los Angeles International Airport have garnered recognition for design excellence and outstanding "airside-to-curbside" traveler experience. In 2023 he was awarded an honorary Doctor of Fine Arts degree by North Carolina State University.

== Career ==
Fentress graduated from North Carolina State University's College of Design, School of Architecture in 1972.

After graduation, Fentress early work was at I.M. Pei and Kohn Pedersen Fox in New York City.

Fentress then moved to Denver, Colorado as the Kohn Pedersen Fox's Project Designer for the Rocky Mountain Headquarters of Amoco in downtown Denver. Denver was chosen as the base for his new firm, C.W. Fentress and Associates with James Henry Bradburn. In 2004, Bradburn retired and in 2007 the firm's name was abbreviated from Fentress Bradburn Architects to Fentress Architects. Today, the firm maintains studios in Denver, Colorado, Los Angeles, California, Washington, D.C. and San Jose, California.

Fentress Architects became internationally recognized after designing Denver International Airport (DIA), known for its unique white canvas peaked roof and streamlined "curbside to airside" design. DIA was voted the "Best Airport in North America" for four consecutive years and the fourth "Favourite American Architecture" landmark completed in the last fifteen years, ahead of the Getty Centre, TransAmerica Building and the Guggenheim Museum.

Fentress also designed Incheon International Airport in Seoul, South Korea, which was voted the World's Best Airport by Skytrax's 2009 World Airport Awards, a survey of 8.6 million international travellers.

In May 2008, the City of Los Angeles selected Fentress Architects to modernize Los Angeles International Airport, the fifth busiest airport in the world.

Fentress was inducted into the Denver Tourism Hall of Fame in 2009.

Fentress designed the Colorado Convention Centre, winner of 18 design awards. Fentress is also the architect for the new Colorado Judicial Centre adjacent to the State Capitol.

Fentress has a design portfolio of $26 billion architectural projects worldwide. Designs by Fentress have been featured in more than 1,200 national and international articles and books and have been honoured with more than 400 awards and accolades for design excellence and innovation.

In 2010, Fentress was given the Thomas Jefferson Award by the American Institute of Architects. The Jefferson Award recognizes Fentress for "a portfolio of accomplishments that evidences great depth while making a significant contribution to the quality of public architecture."

Fentress was inducted into the Colorado Business Hall of Fame by Junior Achievement-Rocky Mountain and the Denver Metro Chamber of Commerce in 2017.

In 2022, Fentress designed Terminal C at Orlando International Airport.

== Works ==
=== Airports ===
- Los Angeles International Airport Tom Bradley International Terminal, Los Angeles, California, USA
- Denver International Airport Main Passenger Terminal, Denver, Colorado, USA
- Incheon International Airport Passenger Terminal, Seoul, Korea
- Seattle-Tacoma International Airport Central Terminal Expansion Seattle, Washington, USA

=== Government Buildings ===
- California Department of Education Headquarters, Sacramento, California, USA
- City of Oakland Administration Buildings, Oakland, California, USA
- Clark County Government Centre, Las Vegas, Nevada, USA
- Sacramento City Hall, Sacramento, California, USA

=== Office Buildings ===
- One South Church, Tucson, Arizona, USA. Original designs called for a pair of twin towers; one tower was completed in 1986, while construction on the remainder has been on hold indefinitely.
- 1999 Broadway, Denver, Colorado, USA

=== Museums ===
- National Cowboy and Western Heritage Museum Expansion and Renovation, Oklahoma City, Oklahoma, USA
- National Museum of the Marine Corps, Quantico, Virginia, USA
- National Museum of Wildlife Art, Jackson, Wyoming, USA
- National Museum of Intelligence and Special Operations, planned for Asburn, Virginia, USA

=== Venues ===
- Colorado Convention Centre and Phase II Expansion, Denver, Colorado, USA
- Eccles Conference Centre and Peery's Egyptian Theatre, Ogden, Utah, USA
- INVESCO Field at Mile High, Denver, Colorado, USA
- Palm Springs Convention Centre Expansion, Palm Springs, California, USA

== Published texts ==
=== Books ===
- The Master Architect Series III, Fentress Bradburn Selected and Current Works (Australia, The Images Publishing Group Pty Ltd., 1998)
- Curtis Worth Fentress (Milano, Italy: L'Arca Edizioni spa, 1996)
- Fentress Bradburn Architects (Washington, D.C.: Studio Press, 1996)
- Gateway to the West (Australia, The Images Publishing Group Pty Ltd., 2000)
- Millennium, Fentress Bradburn Selected and Current Works, Images Publishing, 2001
- Architecture in the Public Interest, Edizioni, 2001
- Civic Builders, Wiley-Academy, Great Britain, 2002.
- National Museum of the Marine Corps, North Carolina State University College of Design Publication, 2006
- 10 Airports — Fentress Bradburn Architects, Edizioni Press, 2006.
- Portal to the Corps, Images Publishing, 2008
- Closed Mondays, Elizabeth Gill Lui, Nazraeli Press, 2005
- Touchstones of Design [re]defining Public Architecture, Images Publishing, 2010
- Public Architecture: The Art Inside, Oro Publishing, 2010

=== Articles ===
- "Civic Minded Centres," Facility Manager, August/September 2006
- "The Seoul Experience: Incheon International Airport," Airport World, summer 2006
- "Airport Architecture Taking Flight," International Airport Review, July 2001
- "Humanistic Architecture Yields Economic Benefits," Passenger Terminal World, June 2004
- "Airport Architecture: a Blueprint for Success," Passenger Terminal World, May 2004
- "Los Angeles International Airport: Designing a 21st Century Gateway," Architecture Technique, (Chinese Edition) May 2009
- "Making an Impression: Raleigh-Durham International Airport's new Terminal 2 celebrates the airport's role as a gateway to North Carolina," Airport World, Dec/Jan 2009 (UK)
- "Outside the Box: Contemporary Convention Centres," Urban Land Institute, February 2009
- "Civic Icon," Passenger Terminal World, November 2008 (UK)
- "Los Angeles International Airport Redesign Images Unveiled," Building Design, December 9, 2008 (UK)
- "Fentress Architects, Incheon International Airport, Seoul," l'Arca, May 2008 (Italy)
- "Designed for Passengers: RDU," Passenger Terminal World, November 2007 (UK)
- "Active Service: Theatre of War," Museum Practice magazine, Spring 2007 (UK)

== See also ==
- Fentress Architects
