= San Joaquin County Administration Building =

Government building in California

Coordinates: 37.95391°N 121.28679°W

The San Joaquin County Administration Building consolidates 16 support and service departments now occupying leased and owned spaces in downtown Stockton, California. The LEED Gold building supports approximately 500 county staff, with growth space for up to 250 more staff. County residents can now visit a single location to pay taxes, register to vote and obtain marriage licenses, birth certificates and information about their business or home assessments.

The building was designed by Fentress Architects and establishes a civic identity for the San Joaquin County Government. The building has won the 2008 Design Excellence Award, Novum Structures and the 2009 Project of the Year Award, American Public Works Association, Sacramento Chapter.
