= Arraya Tower =

Skyscraper in Kuwait City, Kuwait

Coordinates: 29.376248°N 47.990406°E

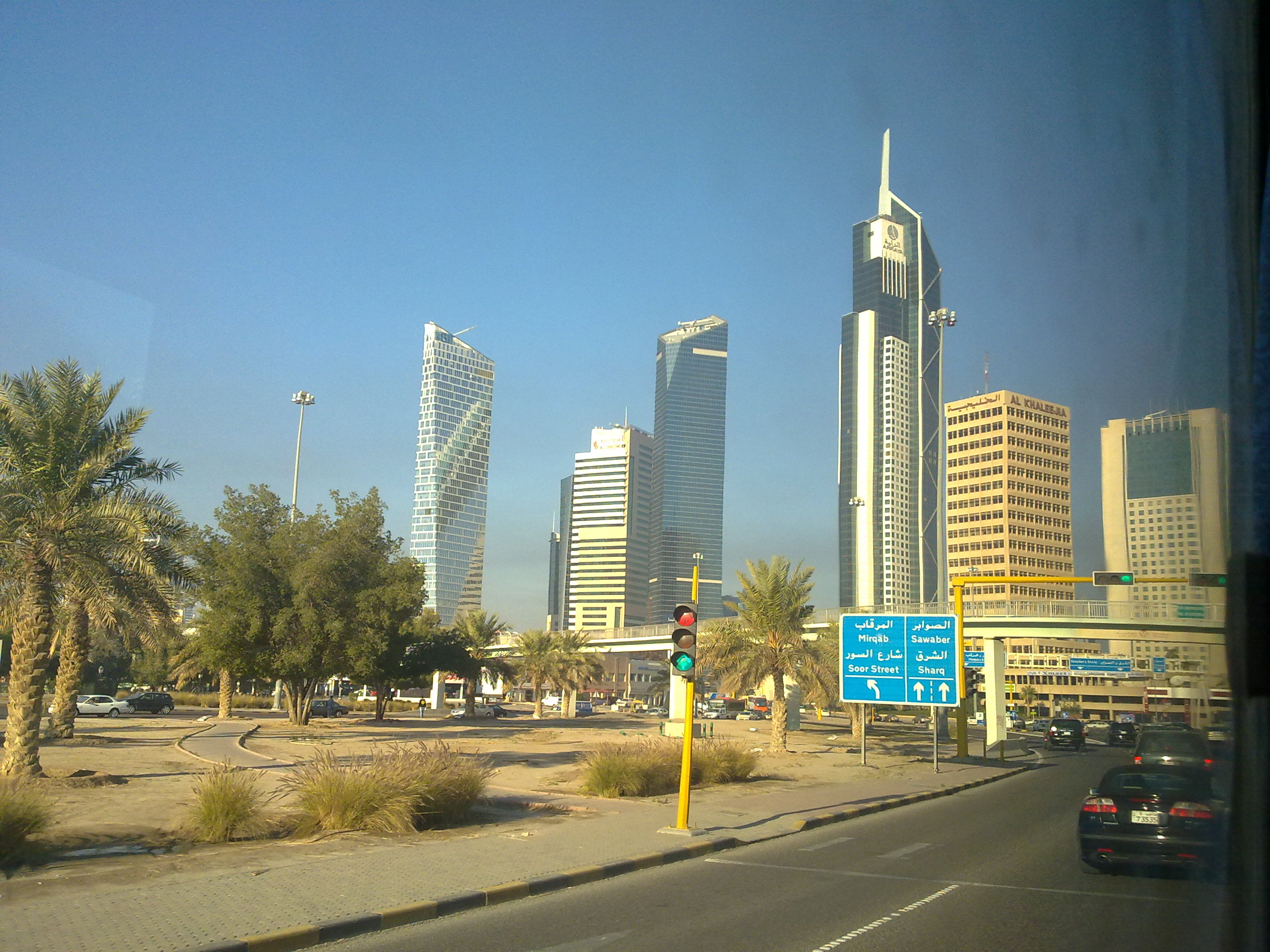
- Interactive map of the Arraya Tower area

General information
- Location: Kuwait City, Kuwait
- Construction started: February 21, 2005
- Topped-out: August 22, 2008
- Completed: October 21, 2009
- Owner: Aspire Zone Foundation

Height
- Architectural: 300 m (980 ft)
- Top floor: 229 m (751 ft)

Technical details
- Floor count: 60
- Lifts/elevators: 16

Design and construction
- Architect: Fentress Architects
- Developer: Salhia Real Estate Company
- Main contractor: Ahmadiah Contracting and Trading Company

The Arraya Tower is a skyscraper completed in 2009 in Kuwait City, Kuwait. The tower serves as a grade-A office structure. With sixty storeys, and 300 metres high (with a 45-metre spire), the building was the tallest tower in Kuwait until the construction of Al Hamra Tower in 2011. On January 19, 2010, The Council on Tall Buildings and Urban Habitat (CTBUH) announced that Arraya Tower was the 4th-tallest building completed in 2009.

Curtis W. Fentress, FAIA, RIBA, of Fentress Architects, was the principal architect of the building, and Ahmadiah Construction was the primary contractor. The tower complements the existing 130-metre-high Arraya Tower housing offices and the Courtyard by Marriott hotel, as well as the upscale Arraya Shopping Mall and the Arraya Ballroom.

Construction on the tower began in February 2005, with occupation scheduled for February 2009. As of August 22, 2008, the tower had been topped out and the superstructure was complete. Exterior cladding, consisting of white marble, green glass and steel rods, was mostly complete. Interior works were well underway and wrapped up in early 2009 in time for the tower's opening.

== See also ==
- List of tallest buildings in Kuwait
