= Fentress Architects =

Design firm in Colorado

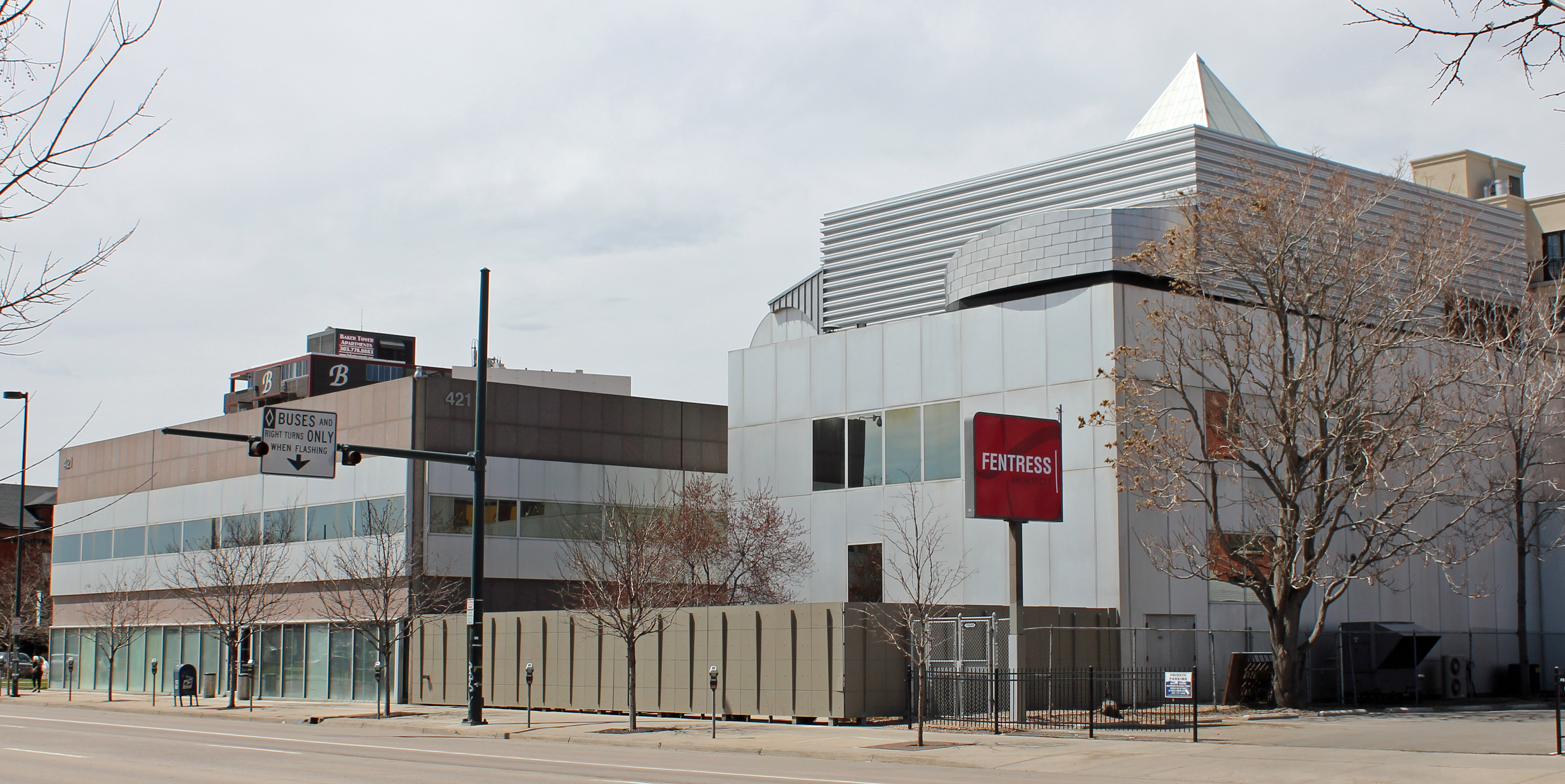
- The Denver, Colorado office.

Practice information
- Key architects: Curtis Fentress, FAIA, RIBA
- Founded: 1980
- Location: Denver, Colorado, United States of America

Significant works and honors
- Buildings: Denver International Airport, Incheon International Airport, Colorado Convention Center, the Broncos Stadium, National Museum of the Marine Corps, Arraya Tower, National Museum of Wildlife Art, the modernized Tom Bradley International Terminal at LAX (2013), and the Green Square Complex in Raleigh, North Carolina (2012)
- Awards: Over 425 for innovation and design excellence

Fentress Architects is an international design firm known for large-scale public architecture such as airports, museums, university buildings, convention centers, laboratories, and high-rise office towers. Some of the buildings for which the firm is best known include Denver International Airport (1995), the modernized Tom Bradley International Terminal at LAX (2013), the National Museum of the Marine Corps near Quantico, Virginia (2005), and the Green Square Complex in Raleigh, North Carolina (2012).

Founded in 1980 by Curtis W. Fentress, FAIA, RIBA, the firm's designs, especially its airports, are often compared to the expressionist architecture of Eero Saarinen. However, architectural curator Donald Albrecht has noted that within Fentress' designs is a "stiff dose of regionalism. " Fentress Architects has studios in Denver, Colorado; Los Angeles; San Jose, California; Washington, D.C.; London; and Shanghai.

In 2010, Curtis Fentress was awarded the highest award for public architecture, the Thomas Jefferson Award, by the American Institute of Architects AIA Awards website. Fentress was also given the Silver Medal in 2010, which is the highest award given to an architect from the AIA Western Mountain Region for the contributions made to the region. In 2012, Fentress was awarded AIA Colorado's Architect of the Year.

Fentress Architects is the designer of the Arraya Tower in Kuwait City. The tower is the tallest in Kuwait and the 53rd tallest in the world

== History ==
Curtis Fentress graduated with honors from North Carolina State University's College of Design, School of Architecture where he received a Bachelor of Architecture degree. Following graduation, he joined the firm of I.M. Pei and Partners in New York City. As a Senior Designer, he was responsible for the master planning of major site development plans. He became a project designer with the New York architectural firm of Kohn Pedersen Fox. During this time, he came to Denver as the Project Designer for the Rocky Mountain Headquarters of Amoco in downtown Denver.

In January 1980, Fentress formed C.W. Fentress and Associates with James Henry Bradburn. After early success, the collapse of the oil and gas industries in Colorado in the early 1980s ushered in a period of difficulty for the firm. Fentress Architects' fortunes rebounded in 1987 when the firm won a design competition for the Colorado Convention Center. The competition pitted Fentress and his partners against several better-financed and more famous opponents, including Phil Anschutz, who had partnered with the firm belonging to Curtis Fentress' former mentor, I.M. Pei. It was only in the 1990s that Fentress Architects rose to international fame by designing the Denver International Airport. The peaked roof of the terminal has become well known to travelers worldwide and ushered in a revolution in more expressionistic airport design. Curator Donald Albrecht credits the design of Denver International Airport with bringing glamor back to the airport typology.

The unveiling of DIA was marked by a dysfunctional "state-of-the-art" baggage delivery system (the vendor at fault has since replaced the system). Subsequently, DIA has been voted the "Best Airport in North America" and the fourth "Favorite American Architecture" completed in the last fifteen years.

In 2001, Fentress designed the Incheon International Airport in Seoul, South Korea, voted "Best Airport Worldwide" four consecutive years by Airport Council International's Airport Quality Survey program. Airport Council "Best Airport in the World" in 2007 by passengers surveyed for the Official Airlines Guide. The firm designs a range of large scale projects (see listing below) from museums and convention centers, to stadiums and commercial office buildings.

Bradburn retired, and in 2007, the firm's name was abbreviated from Fentress Bradburn Architects to Fentress Architects. To date, the firm has won 425 design and innovation awards and has a design portfolio of $27 billion. Each year, more than 330 million people worldwide visit a project designed by Fentress Architects.

== Now Boarding ==
In 2012, a major museum exhibition of Fentress Architects' airport designs entitled Now Boarding: Fentress Airports + the Architecture of Flight was opened at the Denver Art Museum. Curated by Donald Albrecht, architectural curator for the Museum of the City of New York whose previous exhibitions include well-received retrospectives on the work of such architectural notables as Eero Saarinen and Charles and Ray Eames, Now Boarding ran for nearly three months.

A travelling version of the exhibition appeared in Amsterdam in November 2012, and the exhibition's full version will open in at the Museum of Flying in Santa Monica, CA beginning in March 2013.

== Awards and honors ==
World's Best Airports: Fentress-designed Incheon International Airport in Seoul, South Korea was voted "World's Best Airport" by Skytrax's 2009 World Airport Awards, a survey of 8.6 million international travelers.

World's Most Beautiful Airports:

- Incheon International Airport
- Denver International Airport

Denver's airport features a Teflon-coated tensile fabric roof—the world's largest when the airport opened in 1995.

World's 4th tallest building completed in 2009: Fentress is the designer of the world's 4th tallest building completed in 2009—Arraya Tower in Kuwait City, also the tallest in Kuwait. Arraya is one of 14 high rises in Fentress' design portfolio in the Persian Gulf.

== Architectural philosophy ==
Fentress has developed a design process he calls the "Patient Search". He has said of the process; "I don't begin with a preconceived notion of what the building needs to be – it is not a sculpture. I patiently search, walk the site, study the culture, follow our process until I find a seam somewhere, crack it open and discover the art inside." Asked about his philosophical approach, Fentress once stated, "My philosophy is ultimately...pragmatism".

== Rankings ==
- Architectural Record's "Top 150 Architecture Firms" – Fentress Architects ranked #24 among architecture-only firms
- Building Design & Construction's "Giants 300," Top Architects – Fentress Architects ranked #18 among architecture-only firms
- Engineering News Record's "Top 500 Design Firms" – Fentress Architects ranked #29 among architecture-only firms
- Engineering News Record's "Top Airport Design Firms" – Fentress Architects ranked in top 25 firms
- In 2003, Colorado Construction ranked Fentress Architects as the Top Architectural Firm in Colorado. Fentress ranked #14 in California Construction's "Top Design Firms" in 2005.

== Sustainable design ==
- 1993 Architecture and Energy Award for the Natural Resources Building in Olympia, Washington.
- About half of the firm's design professionals are LEED accredited.
- More than 60% of Fentress' projects under construction or completed in 2009 were LEED certified or pending certification.
- 2003 LEED Gold 2.0 award for California's Department of Education Headquarters Building, which received Platinum certification in 2006 by the U.S. Green Building Council's Leadership in Energy and Environmental Design (LEED) rating system. It was featured as a case study in the Fall 2009 issue of High Performing Buildings.

LEED certified projects include, but are not limited to:

- Sanford Consortium for Regenerative Medicine—LEED Gold
- Green Square Complex—LEED Platinum (expected)
- Palazzo Verdi—LEED Gold
- San Joaquin County Administration Building—LEED Gold
- Santa Fe Community Convention Center—LEED Gold
- David E. Skaggs Federal Building (NOAA)
- UCI Humanities Gateway — LEED Platinum
- California Department of Education Headquarters—LEED Platinum

== Projects ==
Airports

- Denver International Airport Main Passenger Terminal, Denver, Colorado, USA
- Incheon International Airport Passenger Terminal, Seoul, South Korea
- Los Angeles International Airport Master Plan and International Terminal, Los Angeles, California, USA
- Raleigh-Durham International Airport Terminal 2 Redevelopment, Raleigh, North Carolina, USA
- Seattle-Tacoma International Airport Central Terminal Expansion Seattle, Washington, USA
- Norman Y. Mineta San Jose International Airport, Terminal B San Jose, California, USA
- Sacramento International Airport, Sacramento, California, USA
- Doha International Airport (Tower), Doha, Qatar

Civic

- Ralph L. Carr Judicial Center, Denver, Colorado, USA
- California Department of Education Headquarters, Sacramento, California, USA
- City of Oakland Administration Buildings, Oakland, California, USA
- Clark County Government Center, Las Vegas, Nevada, USA
- Colorado State Capitol Renovations, Denver, Colorado, USA
- Jefferson County Government Center, Golden, Colorado, USA
- Regional Transportation Center and Flood Control District Headquarters, Las Vegas, Nevada, USA
- Sacramento City Hall, Sacramento, California, USA
- San Joaquin County Administration Building, Stockton, California, USA

Commercial Office & Mixed-Use

- Arraya Class A Office Tower, Kuwait City, Kuwait -- World's 4th tallest building completed in 2009
- Baitek, Kuwait City, Kuwait
- Dubai Mixed-Use Towers, Dubai, United Arab Emirates
- Kuwait Business Town, Al Sharq, Kuwait
- 1999 Broadway, Denver, Colorado, USA
- 421 Broadway, Denver, Colorado, USA
- Gulf Canada Resources Limited, Denver, Colorado, USA
- JD Edwards & Co Corporate Campus, Denver, Colorado, USA
- UniSource Energy Tower, Tucson, Arizona, USA
- Palazzo Verdi Mixed-Use, Greenwood Village, Colorado, USA

Cultural

- Green Square Complex, Raleigh, North Carolina, USA
- Army Visitor & Education Center, Carlisle, Pennsylvania USA
- Buffalo Bill Historical Center, Cody, Wyoming, USA
- Draper National History Museum and Whitney Gallery, Cody, Wyoming, USA
- Museum of Science, Boston, Massachusetts, USA
- Museum of Western Art, The Navarre, Denver, Colorado, USA
- National Cowboy and Western Heritage Museum Expansion and Renovation, Oklahoma City, Oklahoma, USA
- National Museum of the Marine Corps, Quantico, Virginia, USA
- National Museum of Wildlife Art, Jackson, Wyoming, USA

Laboratory

- Sanford Consortium for Regenerative Medicine, La Jolla, California, USA
- David E. Skaggs Research Center, Boulder, Colorado, USA
- Natural Resources Building, Olympia, Washington, USA
- University of Colorado Denver (UCD), Anschutz Medical Campus, Research Complex I, Aurora, Colorado, USA
- UCDHSC, Anschutz Medical Campus, Research Complex II, Aurora, Colorado, USA

Public Assembly

- Arvada Center Expansion, Arvada, Colorado, USA
- Colorado Convention Center and Phase II Expansion, Denver, Colorado, USA
- Eccles Conference Center and Peery's Egyptian Theatre, Ogden, Utah, USA
- Sports Authority Field at Mile High, Denver, Colorado, USA
- Palm Springs Convention Center Expansion, Palm Springs, California, USA
- Pasadena Conference Center Expansion, Pasadena, California USA
- Santa Fe Conference Center, Santa Fe, New Mexico, USA

Education

- Tennyson Center for Children, Denver, Colorado, USA
- Denver Academy High School, Denver, Colorado, USA
- Mathematics Building & Gemmill Engineering Library, University of Colorado at Boulder, Colorado, USA
- Humanities Gateway, University of California, Irvine; Irvine, California, USA

Hotel & Residential

- One Polo Creek, Denver, Colorado, USA
- One Wynkoop Plaza, Denver, Colorado, USA
- Palmetto Bay Plantation, Roatan, Bay Islands, Honduras
- Tritch Building Renovation into Courtyard by Marriott, Denver, Colorado, USA
- Watermark Luxury Residences, Denver, Colorado, USA

== See also ==
- Curtis W. Fentress
