= National Museum of Intelligence and Special Operations =

Planned national museum honoring the Office of Strategic Services

- Location: Kincora, Virginia, US
- Coordinates: 39.039103043194224°N 77.43993777176611°W
- Visitors: Expected 100,000
- Founder: Charles Pinck
- Curator: Patrick Gallagher
- Architect: Curtis Fentress
- Owner: OSS Society
- Website: nationalintelligencemuseum.org

The National Museum of Intelligence and Special Operations is a future private museum in the United States, planned for the area of Kincora, Virginia. As a private museum project of the OSS Society, it was recognized in the National Defense Authorization Act for Fiscal Year 2023. It was designed by architect Curtis Fentress and Fentress Studios with roughly 14,000 square feet (1,300 m^{2}) of exhibit space, a 6,000-square-foot (560 m^{2}) lobby, and a 200-seat educational space. Overall, the museum is expected to be between 50,000 square feet (4,600 m^{2}) and 60,000 square feet (5,600 m^{2}). They expect to host around 100,000 visitors each year.

The museum's cost was projected at $81 million in 2018, rising to $93 million in 2019. By 2023, that number had risen to $125 million. Patrick Gallagher is designing the museum exhibit spaces.

In 2015, the OSS Society contacted the Canadian company Lord Cultural Resources to develop the master plan for the museum. Lord drew up plans for staffing, exhibition user experience, capital projections, and other aspects of creating the museum. After this, Fentress Studios was contacted to design the architectural plans. In 2018, the Starr Foundation contributed a gift of $10 million to the capital funding.

Originally, when Charles Pinck, the president of the OSS Society, announced the creation of the museum and went on funding rounds throughout the DC Beltway area, his plan was to open the museum by 2021. His primary motivation was to honor the less-than-100 living members of the Office of Strategic Services (OSS) before they died. However, these plans were interrupted by the COVID-19 pandemic, and the groundbreaking was consistently delayed.

When he was interviewed in 2023, President Pinck said that the OSS Society still had plans to build the museum, and told reporters his plans were to break ground on the museum in July 2025 with a target for opening in late 2027.
