= OSS Society =

Veterans of US WWII intelligence service

- Formation: 1947; 79 years ago
- Headquarters: Washington, D.C.
- Founder: William J. Donovan
- Affiliations: Office of Strategic Services, Central Intelligence Agency
- Website: www.osssociety.org
- Formerly called: Veterans of the OSS

The Office of Strategic Services Society, formerly known as the Veterans of the OSS, is a 501(c)(3) organization nonprofit association of veterans of the Office of Strategic Services (OSS), their families, and other members dedicated to preserving the legacy of the famed intelligence agency.

The Veterans of the OSS was founded in 1947 by General William J. Donovan in New York City, and based there for 50 years. In 1997, the name OSS Society was adopted, and the Society moved to Washington, DC.

The OSS Society is currently in efforts with other IC organizations to create a National Museum of Intelligence and Special Operations in Virginia.

In 2016, the OSS Society successfully negotiated, in coordination with the State Department and the National Park Service, to have the E Street Complex awarded the status of National Historic Place by the National Register of Historic Places.

== Honorable chairs ==
- David Petraeus
- Ross Perot
- James R. Schlesinger
- William H. Webster
- John Slim, 2nd Viscount Slim
- Paul E. Lefebvre
- John D. Bennett
- Bryan D. Brown
- Charles T. Cleveland
- Robert M. Gates
- Porter J. Goss
- Gina C. Haspel
- Ronald D. Johnson
- James N. Mattis
- Ellen E. McCarthy
- William H. McRaven
- Eric T. Olson
- Leon E. Panetta
- Norton A. Schwartz
- Joseph L. Votel
- William H. Webster
- James Woolsey Jr.
- Daniel Yoo

== Awards ==
- William J. Donovan Award
- Distinguished Service Award
- Hugh Montgomery Award
- Peter Ortiz Award
- Virginia Hall Award
- John Waller Award
- Stanley Lovell Award

== Donovan Award winners ==
- 1961 Allen W. Dulles
- 1963 John J. McCloy
- 1964 William W. Quinn
- 1965 Dwight D. Eisenhower
- 1966 Earl Mountbatten of Burma
- 1967 Everett McKinley Dirksen
- 1969 J. Russell Forgan
- 1970 The Astronauts of Apollo 11
- 1971 David K.E. Bruce
- 1974 William J. Casey
- 1977 Ambassador Robert D. Murphy
- 1979 Jacques Chaban-Delmas
- 1981 Margaret Thatcher
- 1982 John A. McCone
- 1983 Richard Helms
- 1983 Sir William Stephenson
- 1986 Ronald W. Reagan
- 1991 George H.W. Bush
- 1993 Dr. Carl F. Eifler
- 1995 William E. Colby
- 2004 Dr. Ralph J. Bunche
- 2005 William H. Webster
- 2009 David H. Petraeus
- 2010 Ross Perot
- 2011 Eric T. Olson, USN (Ret.)
- 2012 Robert M. Gates
- 2013 William H. McRaven
- 2014 Leon E. Panetta
- 2015 Hugh Montgomery
- 2016 Norton A. Schwartz
- 2017 Michael G. Vickers
- 2018 Gina C. Haspel
- 2019 James N. Mattis
- 2022 George J. Tenet
- 2023 William J. Burns
