= Marine Corps Air-Ground Museum =

Coordinates: 38.507128°N 77.306786°W

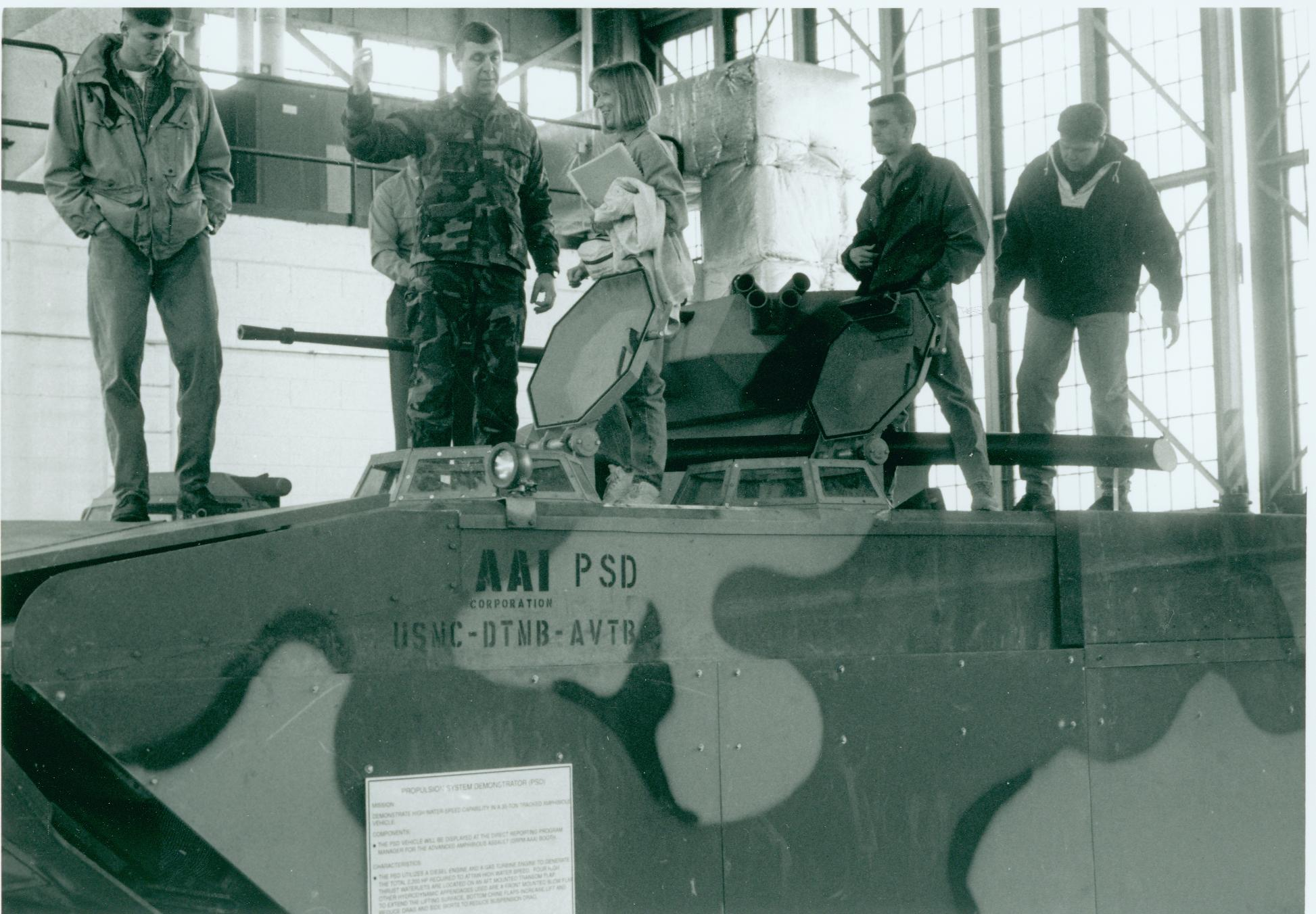
- Established: May 6, 1978
- Location: Brown Field; Marine Corps Base Quantico; Quantico, Virginia; United States
- Type: Military History

The Marine Corps Air-Ground Museum was located at Brown Field, Marine Corps Base Quantico, Quantico, Virginia. It housed a wide variety of historic Marine Corps vehicles/tanks (both wheeled and tracked), equipment, artillery pieces and aircraft (both fixed wing (airplanes) and rotary wing (helicopters)) to trace the evolution and significance of the Marine Air-Ground Team. It also contained several pieces of foreign equipment, such as a Soviet SU-76M self-propelled howitzer. The museum closed on November 15, 2002, during the establishment of the National Museum of the Marine Corps.

== History ==
The museum initially opened on May 6, 1978, as the Marine Corps Aviation Museum and eventually became the Marine Corps Air-Ground Museum in the mid-1980s as the collection expanded beyond aviation assets. The museum began in two aircraft hangars and added a third in 1990.

== See also ==
- History of the United States Marine Corps
- Marine Corps Base Quantico
- Marine Corps Museums
