= Palm Springs Convention Center =

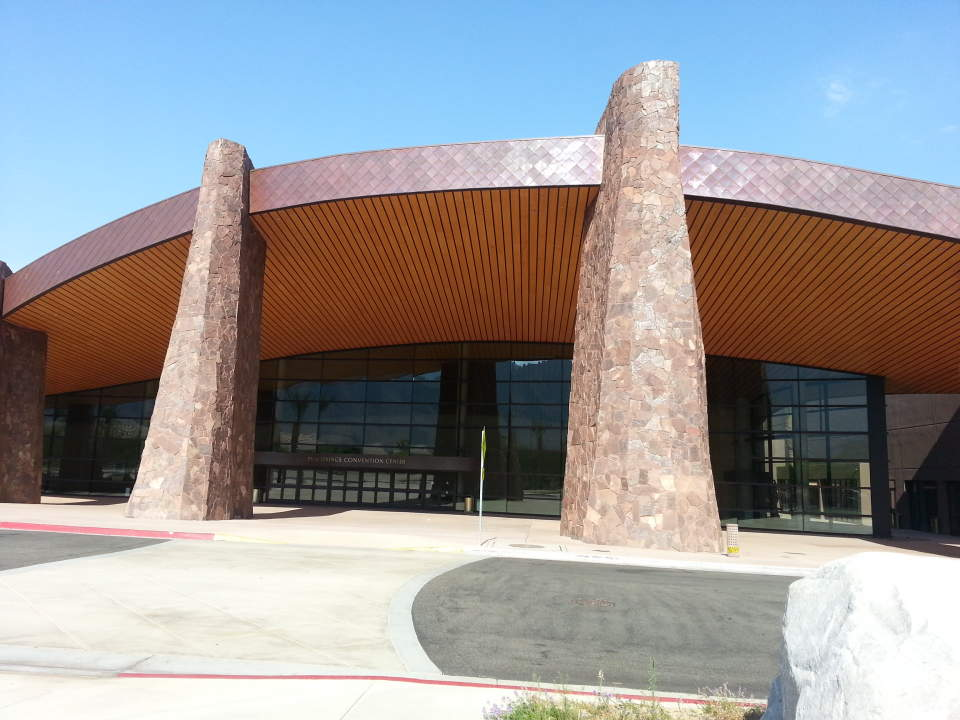
- Interactive map of Palm Springs Convention Center
- Location: Palm Springs, California
- Coordinates: 33°49′35″N 116°32′16″W
- Owner: City of Palm Springs
- Operator: Oak View Group
- Capacity: 12,000

Construction
- Opened: 1974
- Renovated: 2005
- Architect: William Pereira

Website
- Palm Springs Convention Center

The Palm Springs Convention Center is a 245,000 sq ft (22,800 m^{2}) convention center located in downtown Palm Springs, California. Architect William Pereira designed the original building in 1974. In 2005, the Convention Center completed a massive expansion, adding over 100,000 sq ft (9,300 m^{2}). It can accommodate groups from 12 to 12,000 people. The new design, by Fentress Architects, pulls colors and design elements from the surrounding desert. Additional meeting space is available at the attached 410 room convention hotel. It is managed by Oak View Group.

== See also ==
- List of convention centers in the United States

Preceded by South Padre Island Convention Centre; South Padre Island, Texas (2001-2002); Baton Rouge River Center; Baton Rouge, Louisiana (2005)	Miss Teen USA; Venue; 2003; 2004; 2006	Succeeded by Baton Rouge River Center; Baton Rouge, Louisiana (2005); Pasadena Convention Center; Pasadena, California (2007)
