= Marine Corps Museum =

Coordinates: 38°52′30″N 76°59′32″W

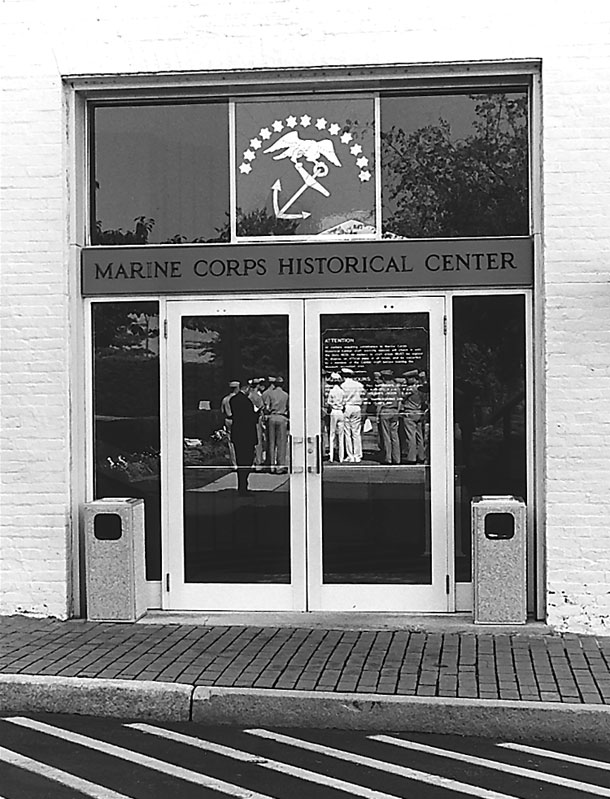
- Established: 1940 (at Marine Corps Base Quantico)
- Location: 1940–1960; Little Hall; Marine Corps Base Quantico; Quantico, Virginia; 1960–1976; Building 1019; Marine Corps Base Quantico; 1977–2005; Marine Corps Historical Center; Building 58; Washington Navy Yard; 9th and M Streets; Washington, DC; United States
- Type: Military History

The Marine Corps Museum was located on the first floor of the Marine Corps Historical Society in Building 58 of the Washington Navy Yard, 9th and M Streets (southeast), Washington, D.C. It housed a wide variety of exhibits with artifacts relating to the history of the U.S. Marines. It also contained a collection of art relating to the Marines and a historical Time Tunnel. For many years, the Marine Corps Museum served as a center for preserving and showcasing the Marine Corps legacy. The museum closed on 1 July 2005, during the establishment of the National Museum of the Marine Corps.

== History ==
In the early 20th century, the Marine Corps displayed historical items such as captured weapons and flags in war trophy rooms at the Headquarters Marine Corps and the Marine Corps Barracks in Washington, D.C. In 1940, the Marine Corps established a proto-museum on the second deck of Little Hall at Marine Corps Base Quantico. In 1952, the Commandant of the Marine Corps, General Lemuel C. Shepherd Jr., directed his staff to create a Marine Corps exhibit at the Smithsonian Institution after noticing no such display existed there. The Marine Corps Historical Branch tasked reserve Major John H. Magruder III with developing the exhibit at the Smithsonian.

Upon completion of an exhibit at the Hall of Military and Naval History at the Smithsonian Castle, Major Magruder went on to establish an expanded museum, which opened on 13 September 1960, in Building 1019 next to Little Hall. The Marine Corps Museum continued to expand and eventually moved to Washington Navy Yard in 1977 after closing the Quantico location in 1976.

== See also ==
- Marine Corps Museums

== Gallery ==
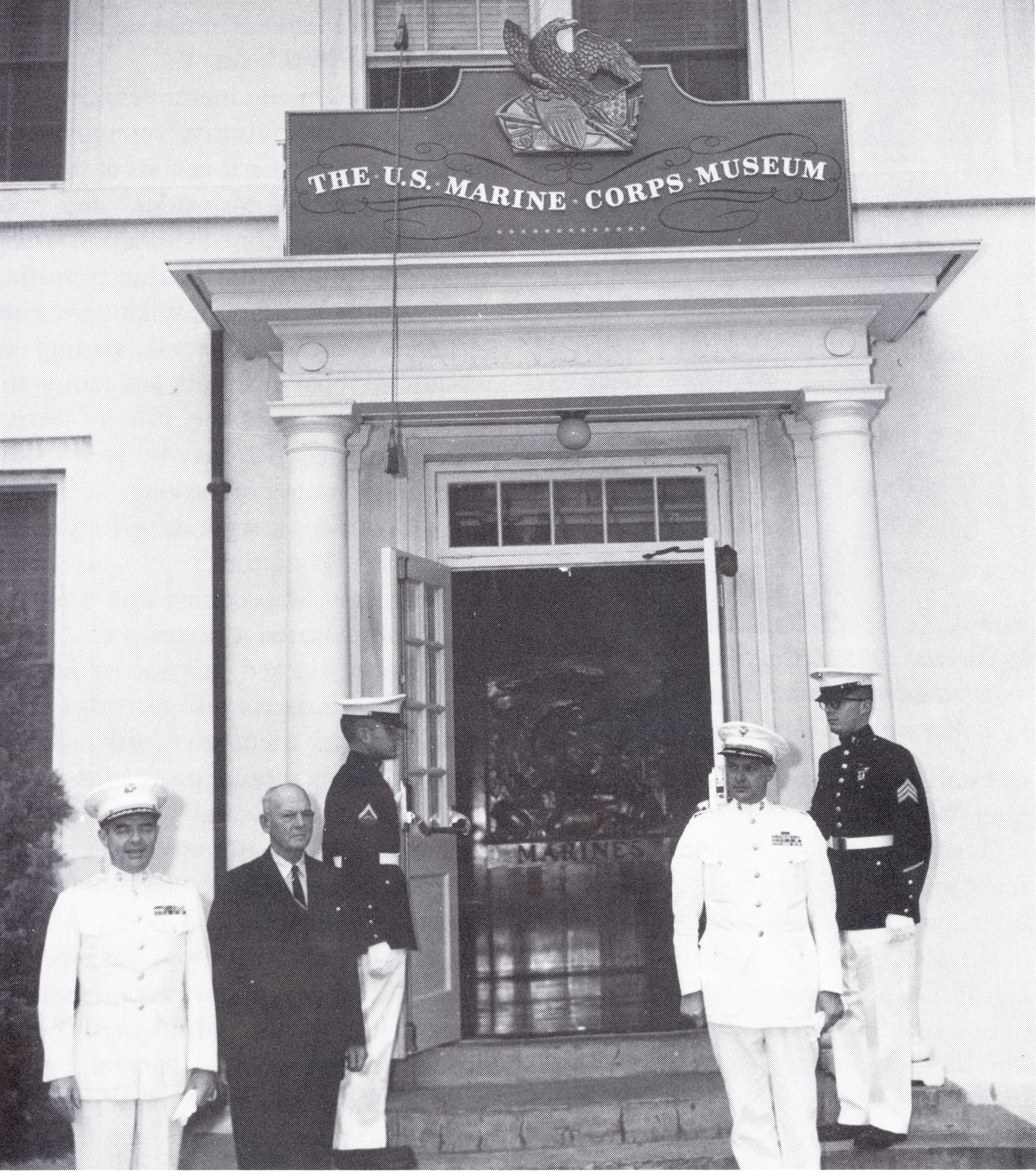
Dedication of the Marine Corps Museum at Marine Corps Base Quantico in 1960.

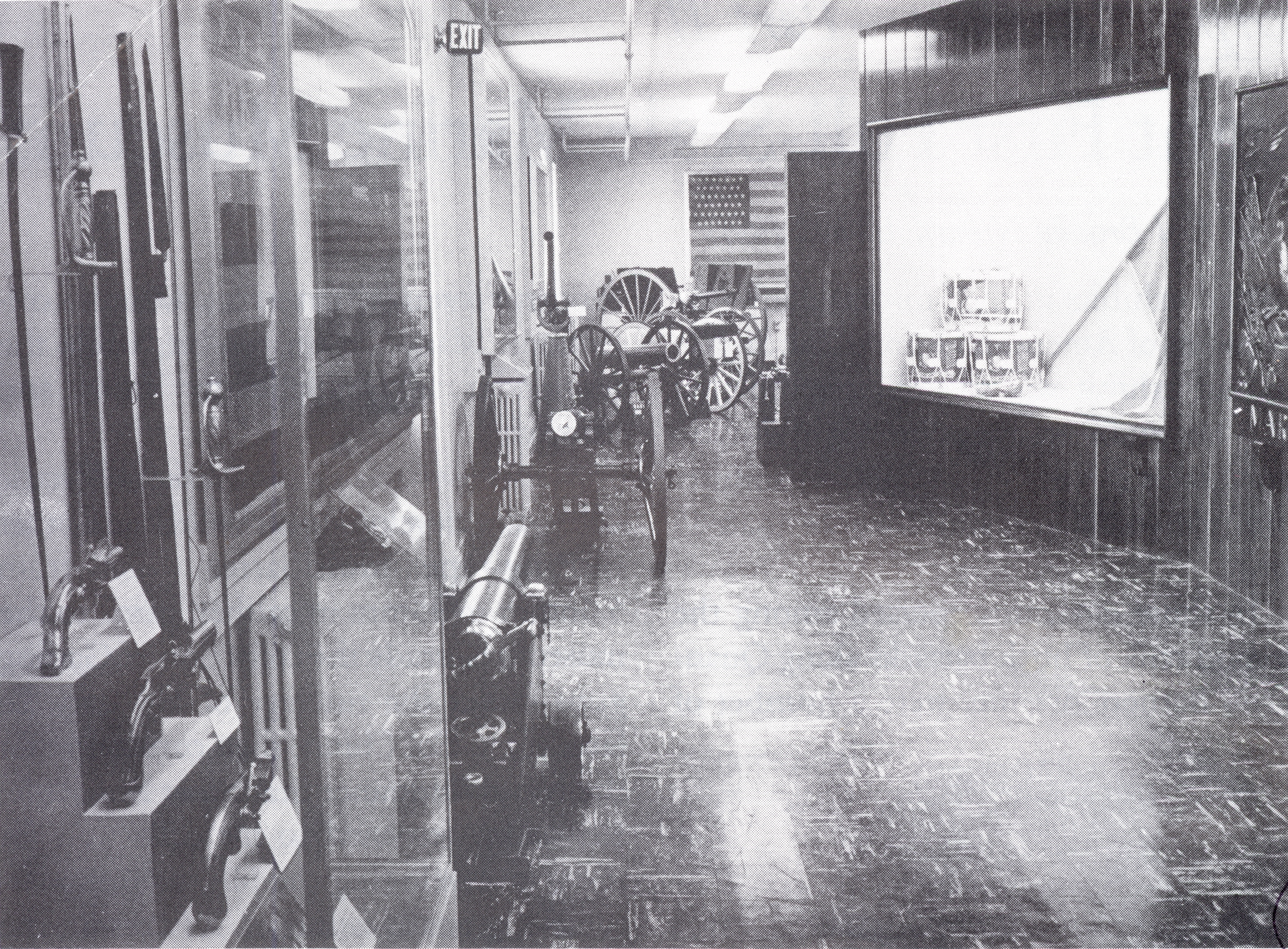
Displays at the Marine Corps Museum in Quantico.
