= Pierre LaFitte =

French and American criminal and spy

Jaques Voignier
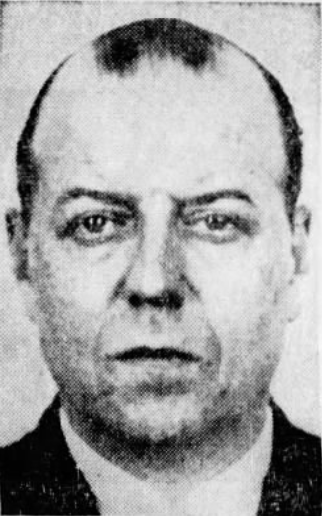
- Mugshot of Jacques Voignier as his alias Pierre LaFitte at Ellis Island Detention Center in 1951
- Born: Between 1900 and 1910; Corsica or New Orleans or Paris or Belgium
- Died: Most likely
- Other names: Colonel James Williams; Joseph Pilcer; Joseph Gaven; Powerful Pierre; The Pirate; The Ghost; Jean Pierre LaFitte; Pierre LaFitte; Gus Manoliti; Frank Maceo; Hidell; Jean Martin; LaChapelle; Louis Tabet; Anthony Shillitani; Joseph Leon Achille Gaven; Andre Adrien Louis Pelaud; Doctor D.F.P. Devilliers; Cecil Downs; Jean Labadie; Monard; Mornard
- Occupations: Art thief; Smuggler; Undercover operative; Nazi hunter; Chef; Painter
- Employers: Federal Bureau of Narcotics; Federal Bureau of Investigation; Office of the Coordinator of Information; Office of Strategic Services; Central Intelligence Agency; United States Secret Service
- Known for: Art theft, fencing, larceny, illegal immigration, narcotics trafficking, smuggling, assassination
- Spouse: Rene Martin (not Voignier)
- Children: 1

Jaques Voignier, also known as Jean Pierre LaFitte, was a prolific French and American criminal and confidential informant, eventually operating as an undercover spy for the American Federal Bureau of Narcotics (FBN) in the pursuit of criminal narcotics and mafia organizations around the world. He also worked for the Federal Bureau of Investigation (FBI) to track and hunt down white collar criminals and art thieves. Notoriously, Voignier used the connections he made as an undercover operative to participate in the criminal underworld while also investigating it - but some historians suggest this was part of a deception invented by the FBI in 1951. By the year 1955, he had been arrested or detained at least 34 times in 34 years, but spent very little time in prison compared to his official sentences. Voignier was also involved in the CIA's MKUltra experiments, and was one of the two men in the room with Frank Olson on the night that Olson died.

In 1955, the journalist Bob Considine of the International News Service wrote:

"...one of the most amazing underworld figures of the age. He is a mystery man who chooses to call himself, at times, Pierre LaFitte, and claims that he is descendant of the notorious Nineteenth century smuggler and pirate, Jean Lafitte... Lafitte is an actor who can impersonate any type, from banker to gangster to skilled portrait painter... As artful a liar as he is an imposter... A man who might have made a career on the stage so convincing is he in any role he chooses to assume... The government insists that his real name is Jacques Voignier."

== Early life ==
Voignier was most likely born on the island of Corsica. However, he also once told reporters that he was born in New Orleans. The French newspaper Le Petit Parisien also reported in 1926 that he was born in Paris. Others claimed that he was born in Belgium.

His name at birth is not currently known.

Voignier most likely spent his youth in his mother's house in Marseilles, France, where he moved as an early teenager when she was murdered, her body never being found. However, when he grew up he would often recount the story of his mother being a prostitute in a brothel somewhere in New Orleans, and he would always claim to be the descendant of the famous tax-dodging pirates Jean and Pierre Lafitte.

He was placed in the care of relatives, but ran away from home soon after. In Marseilles, Voignier worked in restaurants and learned to be a chef. By all accounts, Voignier enjoyed cooking, and worked in restaurants around the world throughout his life, under several of his assumed aliases.

Around this time, Voignier met a French-Italian gangster named Francois Spirito, who had started his own gang in Marseilles at the age of 14 and would become the "father of modern heroin trafficking." At this time, Voignier was inducted into the criminal enterprise of the Corsican Brotherhood, where he would eventually earn the Brotherhood Medallion and the Napoleonic Imperial Eagle.

Voignier was involved in the French criminal underworld of Marseilles, selling drugs for Spirito in New York, Montreal, Boston, New Orleans, and Paris. Another person who worked for Spirito at this time was named Joseph Dornay, who went by the alias Joe Orsini. Other members of the gang included Paul Bonaventure Carbone and Antione D'Agostino.

== World War I ==
In 1917, Colonel Dennis E. Nolan, chief of intelligence for the American Expeditionary Forces (AEF), became increasingly concerned about security challenges facing U.S. troops deployed abroad. He requested that the Adjutant General provide fifty trained secret service personnel with experience in police work and fluency in French. The request led to the establishment of a new category of intelligence personnel within the U.S. Army, one not previously contemplated by the War Department. In August 1917, authorization was granted to form a fifty-man Corps of Intelligence Police (CIP), composed of enlisted soldiers holding the rank and pay of infantry sergeants. Nolan desperately wanted individuals that possessed "strong character, courage, and integrity."

Colonel Ralph H. Van Deman, responsible for assembling the unit, quickly encountered difficulties in recruitment. Private detective agencies were initially considered, but when informed of the need for French-speaking investigators, the head of the Pinkerton Agency dismissed the idea as unrealistic, stating of a French speaking intelligence officer that: "There ain't no such animal."

Despite their desire to find those of good moral character, the men they found were largely a crop of undesirables. The War Department then turned to newspaper advertisements in New Orleans and New York City to attract candidates. Those who passed a basic physical examination and demonstrated minimal ability in French were accepted.

According to the authors of America's Secret Army, these men were:

"...a miniature French Foreign Legion. One candidate had a police record. One was mentally unbalanced. One was a French deserter. One was pro-German. One was a Communist... Several were just morons... a delegation of Cajuns... a sprinkling of French Canadians, a coterie of Harvard men... unlikely lads.... a sharp Creole... an Englishman... a 'Hebrew, very shrewd'.... Any kind of French language would do - Cajun, Canadian or French with any sort of foreign accent. What was remarkable was how well this motley crew was to perform once it got to the war."

These men were trained for a month in infantry tactics at Fort Jay in New York Harbor, and issued distinctive green-corded campaign hats and collar insignia marked “IP.” Without civilian attire or formal instruction in intelligence methods, the new CIP were sent to France to begin their duties.

According to Hank Albarelli, when he was under 16 years old, Voignier was one of the members of this group. None of them really knew how old he was, and none of them really knew where he was born. They suspected that he was a French kid who had somehow wound up in New Orleans. On October 25, 1917, Van Deman's unit landed in France and were almost immediately arrested by the United States Marines because they looked so unsavory.

=== Foreign Legion desertion and theft ===
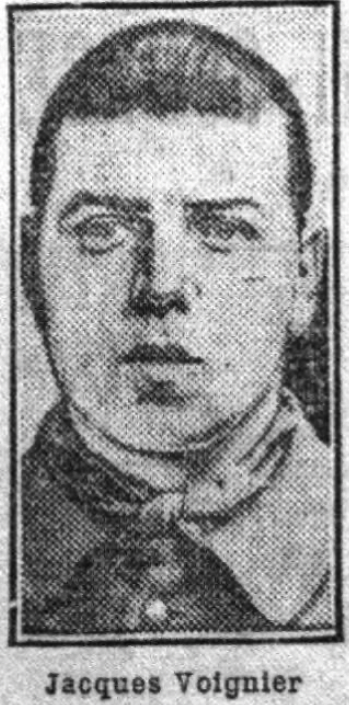
This service photograph of Voignier in the uniform of the French Foreign Legion appeared in Le Petit Parisien in 1926.

On 6 February 1925, Voignier carried out a theft at the Gare de Lyon in Paris. On that date, Colonel Turvil, a British officer, and his wife were preparing to travel to the French Riviera. After checking in their luggage, the couple proceeded to their train compartment. Voignier, dressed elegantly and posing as a fellow passenger, approached a porter who was handling the baggage. Presenting himself as the owner, he claimed the luggage, offered the porter a gratuity, and departed with the suitcases, which contained clothing, personal effects, and jewelry of significant value.

The case was investigated by Brigadier Chollet of the French Judicial Police, who soon identified the suspect as Jacques Voignier, a known recidivist. Following the theft, Voignier had checked into the Hotel Carlton under the name “Colonel James Williams,” remaining there for several days before leaving abruptly. He failed to pay a hotel bill of 2,000 francs and left behind the emptied luggage belonging to the victims. Although police succeeded in locating the jeweler who had purchased some of the stolen items in the Faubourg-Montmartre district, Voignier managed to evade capture for several months.

In early 1926, police received information that a man answering Voignier’s description, using the alias Joseph Gaven, had registered at a hotel on Rue Brey with a female companion. He was arrested on the premises and brought before Commissioner Barthélemy for questioning. Voignier confessed to the theft from Colonel Turvil and provided a detailed account of his criminal activities.

Voignier stated that after the Gare de Lyon theft he had traveled to Saint-Nazaire, where he committed additional frauds before departing for Casablanca. There he was arrested on a warrant from the Saint-Nazaire court and sentenced to two years in prison. During his incarceration, he informed the public prosecutor that he was a deserter from the 4th Marching Regiment of the French Foreign Legion, under the name Joseph Pilcer. He was subsequently transferred to military custody.

Detained at Le Mans, Voignier escaped on 18 March 1926 and returned to Paris, where he reunited with his companion. His reappearance in the capital led to his eventual arrest by the judicial police.

=== Drug Barons of Europe ===
In the interwar period, Voignier returned to running drugs for Spirito.

Voignier also learned the craft of smuggling from Jean Voyatzis, Elie Eliopoulos, and August Del Grazio. This was a network known as the Drug Barons of Europe, and at its head sat Elie Eliopoulos and his brothers George and Anavi – three high-class Greeks who eventually dominated the European narcotics markets. Del Grazio, meanwhile, operated as the mediator between the Drug Barons and the Jewish Mafia, especially growing up alongside a man named Lucky Luciano. Jean Voyatis was the man who had formed connections within the Opium Regie in French Indochina to obtain legally-produced wholesale opium to be refined in warehouses in Europe. The Drug Barons of Europe provided the foundations that would eventually become the French Connection.

== World War II ==
When World War II broke out in 1939, Voignier's old associate Francois Spirito wound up working for the Nazis, as did Paul Carbone, while their primary competition from Paris, the gangster Louis Lyon, worked for the Allies. The members of the French Connection used the war as a cover to eliminate their competition, and there are several examples of European gangsters submitting their old associates to the SS as "Secret Jews." Carbone even tried to use the Peruvian diplomat Carlos Fernández Bácula in a pot-boiled scheme to infect North Africa with narcotics in order to cause the Allies there to go into a stupor. Carbone was killed when the Nazi train that he was riding in was derailed by a French Resistance unit commanded by Louis Lyon. After the war, in his book The Murderers, Harry Anslinger lamented the fact that Louis Lyon had earned the French Legion of Honour.

In 1939, Voignier joined the Office of the Coordinator of Information (COI), which became the Office of Strategic Services (OSS), to defeat the "Axis powers" in Europe. During this time, Voignier first met agents of the Federal Bureau of Narcotics (FBN) which had been tasked by Harry J. Anslinger to the ranks of the COI and OSS for the duration of the war.

One of the FBN agents that Voignier met was Garland H. Williams, who ran the COI and OSS schoolhouses. Williams enrolled Voignier in the program at the Military Intelligence Training Center at Camp Ritchie, where he became an expert in close quarter infiltration, disguise, and silent killing. His fluency in French, Italian, and German made him particularly useful for training and interrogation purposes.

Voignier was involved heavily in espionage and sabotage operations against the Nazis. His involvement in Operation Underworld is still being investigated.

=== The invention of Pierre LaFitte (1941) ===
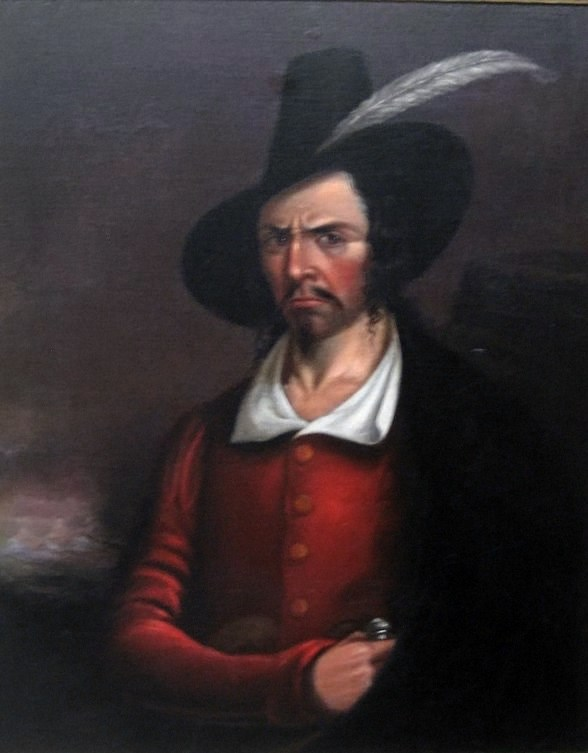
The famous pirate Jean Lafitte is the first half of Voignier's primary alias. His brother was Pierre Lafitte, who is the second half of Voignier's alias.

In 1941, for reasons known only to himself and a few inquisitive policemen, he found himself in New Orleans needing a new identity. Placing an advertisement in a local paper, he posed as an employer seeking a salesman, promising “high rewards for the right man.” The ad was answered by a man named Paul Octave Lafitte.

Voignier conducted an extensive “interview,” collecting personal details including family names, dates of birth, and marriage information. As soon as Paul Octave Lafitte had left, the Voignier rushed to the local offices to obtain certified copies of the real man’s birth, baptismal, and marriage certificates. With these documents, he constructed a new persona—complete with a ready-made family and background—and became “Pierre Lafitte.”

By the mid-1940s, immigration authorities had begun closing in. He spent thousands of dollars fighting deportation. Once, in a burst of desperation, he threw $3,000 on a lawyer’s desk and shouted, “Keep me in this country!”

Still confident, Lafitte continued to reinvent himself. A warrant for his arrest was issued in 1946. Despite spending thousands of dollars on legal fees to remain in the country, he continued to reinvent himself. That same year, he married the owner of a small French restaurant in New York City and joined her business as headwaiter and manager. Later, he founded the “Lafitte Pen Company,” claiming to be the inventor of a new kind of ballpoint pen.

== Federal Bureau of Narcotics ==
Following the end of the Second World War, Voignier returned to Europe, where he attempted to locate François Spirito, who had fled France amid accusations of murder and Nazi collaboration. More accurately, he had fled France for Madrid when Paul Carbone was killed, and he knew that there was a hit out on him in the French Resistance. Reports suggested that Spirito was hiding in Boston with his sister and her husband, a physician. Lafitte also sought out another known collaborator, Joseph Orsini, who had similarly escaped to the United States and established connections with major heroin traffickers. Failing to secure any dealings, Lafitte returned to New York.

After the war, Williams arranged a meeting with FBN agents Arthur Giuliani and George Hunter White, and Voignier became an undercover operative for this organization, and would be handled by White. Voignier became indispensable for the agency, joining their efforts around the world in hunting down narcotics networks.

However, White and Voignier did not really interact until 1948, when they were both stationed in Tehran, and had lengthy conversations about Voignier's dream of becoming a world-renowned restaurant owner.

Later that year, Voignier joined White and Siragusa at the Kefauver Committee for the Senate.

=== Smashing the Orsini Group ===
In 1951, Voignier was placed by White into the jail at the Ellis Island Detention Center, as cellmate to his old friend Joe Orsini. Voignier was assigned by White to take down Orsini's criminal enterprise, the Orsini Group, that he was still running out of the jail. At this time, the federal government created a backstop cover story for Jean Pierre LaFitte - writing that the year 1951 was his first immigration to American soil.

White wrote the following in a letter to Williams in 1975:

"how absolutely amazing it is that every one and their brother has swallowed hook-line-and-sinker the myth of Lafitte's arrival here ... if I didn't know that he'd been around since before they invented iced tea I'd probably believe it myself."

However, White never publicly admitted knowing Voignier before the year 1950. In fact, under several official court affidavits throughout the decades after the Orsini trial, White repeatedly claimed that he had only met "Jean Pierre Lafitte, also known as Jean Martin," sometime around 1950. In an Affidavit filed on April 22, 1970, White wrote:

"Lafitte's successful operations as an Undercover Agent on behalf of the government were due entirely to his intelligence, imagination, courage and integrity and at all times were conducted under the close direction of responsible government officials. His investigations resulted in the conviction of some of the most important narcotic traffickers ever apprehended by the government. In addition, he performed similar accra for the U.S. Secret Service and for the Federal Bureau of Investigation."

While awaiting deportation in 1951, newspapers described Lafitte as a “colorful criminal with a lurid past.” Orsini, also at that time known as Joe Casablanca, was running a criminal enterprise that was worth over $3 million a year. The two men traded stories about their lives.

Operating under the alias Jean Labadie, Lafitte established contact with Orsini’s mistress, Marcelle Ansellem, and gradually gained the confidence of the remaining members of the narcotics network. After securing sufficient evidence, federal agents carried out mass arrests. In the subsequent trial, Lafitte testified against the defendants, identifying key participants. Orsini received a ten-year prison sentence, Ansellem two years, and seventeen other members of the ring were also convicted.

One of the principal suspects, Eugene Giannini – believed to have served as liaison between the Orsini network and figures linked to Lucky Luciano – was murdered soon afterward, reportedly in retribution for having vouched for Lafitte. Lafitte’s "cooperation" with authorities temporarily delayed his deportation, but he continued to face immigration proceedings in the years that followed.

=== Midnight climax and MKUltra ===
Voignier was involved in the Midnight Climax experiments in New York City, part of Sidney Gottlieb's MKUltra project, where he worked for White. Under Midnight Climax, gangsters, pimps, prostitutes, and other American citizens were dosed with narcotics without their knowledge. One of these gangsters was Eugenio Gianni, who had been given hard drugs as a part of the experiment, who would later be killed by the mafia because they suspected him of having blown the whistle on Joe Orsini.

Voignier appears to have played a part in helping White establish a CIA safe house used for the Midnight Climax experiments. The site, located at 81 Bedford Street in Greenwich Village, was in a six-story red brick building in an otherwise quiet residential area.

Voignier's alias Lafitte was described by colleagues as a short, stocky man with a heavy French accent, known among agents by the nickname “the Pirate.” A former associate recalled that Voignier had once provided a detailed description of the Bedford Street apartment, including its array of electronic surveillance devices, though he did not indicate any awareness of its connection to CIA drug testing.

While the Senate investigations into the revelations revealed by the George White Diaries were ongoing, Voignier was living under a new assumed name in an undisclosed New England city. Lafitte later stated in an interview that, while he had worked closely with George White on numerous narcotics cases, he had never knowingly collaborated with the CIA and had no knowledge of the apartment or the experiments conducted there.

=== Death of Frank Olson ===
In the investigation into the death of Frank Olson at the Statler Hotel in Manhattan, Voignier's alias Pierre LaFitte was identified as the hotel bellhop on duty by the hotel manager. Later investigations indicate that when White returned home to attend to his sickly mother, he asked Voignier to take over the responsibility of keeping tabs on Olson. After Olson had consumed a quantity of alcohol and nembutal, in a drunk and high state, he got into a tussle with Voignier and Spirito, and wound up falling out of the window to his death.

After Olson's death, Voignier took several weeks of leave to rest and recuperate in Tampa, Florida.

=== Roxie's in Las Vegas ===
In 1954, nine months after Olson's death, Voignier was sent to Las Vegas by Hank Greenspun at the suggestion of Ed Reid, an employee of Millard Preston Goodfellow's old newspaper, the Brooklyn Eagle, to investigate a brothel called Roxie's, and the corrupt Sheriff who owned it. Greenspun needed to collect factual information because the owners were suing him for libel to the tune of $1,000,000, after a story that Greenspun had published in his newspaper.

Voignier arrived in the city in October under a new alias, Louis Tabet, a supposed Italian gangster from the East Coast. According to reports, his cover story was that he intended to purchase a share in Roxie’s lucrative brothel business and later invest in both the Las Vegas Sun (Greenspan's paper) and a local casino. The alias “Tabet” had previously been used by Voignier in the “Fish Johnson” case.

He demanded autonomy in his operations, an unrestricted expense account, and the freedom to manage his investigation without interference. While staying in style at El Rancho Vegas, he secretly recorded conversations with local figures, many of whom were unaware that their discussions were being documented.

The material collected by Voignier under the Tabet persona reportedly revealed connections between elements of organized crime, prostitution, and certain Las Vegas and Nevada officials. After completing his assignment, Voignier quietly left the city, leaving behind a number of surprised and disillusioned former associates.

=== Other undercover work ===
Around this time, Voignier was sent to Cuba in to investigate heroin networks there, but also to help counter the rise of communism in the country. Voignier would also investigate any suspicious links between Fidel Castro and communism.

Voignier was heavily involved in the French Connection case with George White and Charlie Siragusa.

In 1957, the Italian Mafia put out a contract for assassination on Voignier's alias Pierre LaFitte.

In early 1961, Voignier allegedly recruited contract agents on behalf of the Central Intelligence Agency to participate in the assassination of Patrice Lumumba in the Congo.

Voignier was deployed to Vietnam around this time, where he is suspected to have been involved in the death of Ngo Dinh Diem.

== Federal Bureau of Investigation ==
Sometime in the 1930s or '40s, while operating in the criminal underworld of the Italian mafia in the US, Voignier was also approached by agents of the Federal Bureau of Investigation (FBI) to assist the agency in tracking down stolen art, going undercover with the alias "Gus Manoliti."

In 1950, Voignier was part of the FBI investigation into the theft of 1.2 million dollars from the Brink's headquarters.

=== Fish Johnston ===
In Chicago, Arthur “Fish” Johnston was known as the “million-dollar fence,” reputed for his ability to supply virtually any kind of stolen merchandise, ranging from inexpensive goods to luxury furs. Operating as both a wholesale and retail dealer, Johnston sold stolen property to discount shops, organized crime networks, and ordinary buyers seeking bargains. In April 1950, Chicago police raided one of his warehouses and recovered stolen goods valued at approximately $500,000. Despite the arrest, Johnston leveraged his connections within the remnants of the Al Capone mob, including associates such as Jake “Greasy Thumb” Guzik, to delay his trial more than twenty times over the next three years.

Voignier, working with the Federal Bureau of Investigation (FBI), entered the operation under the alias "Joseph Tabet," posing as a fellow fence. Voignier succeeded in gaining Johnston’s confidence and provided information that led to additional raids on two more of Johnston’s warehouses.

Confronted with overwhelming evidence, Johnston and one of his accomplices pleaded guilty to charges of receiving and selling stolen property. Johnston was sentenced to ten years in prison, while the associate received a three-year sentence. After the conclusion of the case, Voignier left Chicago with his expenses covered.

=== The Cathedral Art Robbery ===
Voignier was the central undercover agent in the FBI's operation to recover nine religious paintings stolen from St. Joseph's Roman Catholic proto-cathedral in Bardstown, Kentucky. Posing as "Gus Manoletti," a transatlantic ship steward and international fence, he was assigned to the case shortly after the theft, which had occurred in November, 1952.

His mission culminated in a sting operation at the Drake Hotel in Chicago. Voignier made contact with one of the defendants, Norton Kretske, and negotiated to purchase the stolen paintings for $40,000. He played his role meticulously, even joining Kretske for dinners and drinks where Kretske, after being assuredly asked if there was "any blood on them," revealed that his "boy" had cut the pictures from the frames in a safe way.

On Good Friday, April 3, 1953, Voignier and Kretske drove to a house to retrieve the paintings and then proceeded to the hotel parking lot. There, Voignier gave the pre-arranged signal, removing his coat, which prompted FBI agents to swarm the car, arrest Kretske, and recover the artworks. To preserve his cover, Voignier was also arrested and booked.

At the trial, Voignier was the government's surprise star witness. His testimony was devastating to the defense, as he detailed the entire undercover operation, including the negotiations and Kretske's incriminating statements about the theft. However, his appearance and past became a major focus of the trial. The defense aggressively cross-examined him, presenting evidence of a long history of using aliases and arrests in various countries. They introduced records that labeled him "a lunatic and a psychopathic liar" in an attempt to destroy his credibility. For a time, the trial seemed to shift from the defendants to Voignier himself.

Despite these attacks, the government successfully defended its witness, maintaining a wall of secrecy around his true identity and background due to his value as an agent. His testimony was pivotal, and while his character was fiercely contested, the operation he led ultimately led to the conviction of Norton Kretske.

== Arrest in New Orleans ==
In 1969, the FBI arrested Voignier under his "Pierre LaFitte" alias in New Orleans, where he was working as the head chef of the Plimsoll Club. He was subsequently jailed in Boston on diamond smuggling charges following the $400,000 swindling of investor Ralph Loomis. The intense publicity surrounding the arrest effectively ended Voignier's undercover career as Pierre LaFitte. However, because Loomis had died the previous year, the trial could not proceed.

== JFK theories ==
Voignier's name has come up in investigations related to the death of John F. Kennedy. Voignier was also allegedly present during the break-in of New Orleans District Attorney Jim Garrison's office to find out any information about the alleged conspirator Clay Shaw.

== Arrest record (according to journalists) ==
- February, 1921
  - As Jacques Voignier
    - Detained at New York City Reformatory
    - Petty larceny charges
- August 12, 1921
  - As Jacques Voignier
    - Deported to France
- June 3, 1924
  - As Joseph Leon Achille Gaven
    - Detained by Paris police
- July 8, 1924
  - Confidence game
    - Sentenced to one year in prison
    - Freed on probation
- July 1, 1925
  - As Mr. Gaven
    - Arrested in Rennes, France
    - Suspected in swindling
- April 8, 1926
  - As Jacques Voignier
    - Arrested on a theft charge
    - Sentenced to 2 years in prison
- March 10, 1927
  - As Jacques Voignier
    - Desertion charges, French military
    - Sentenced to 2 years in military prison
- December 8, 1927
  - As Jacques Voignier
    - Arrested in Luxembourg
    - Theft and swindle charges
    - One month in prison
- April 23, 1928
  - As Jacques Voignier
    - Arrested for using a false name
    - Three months in jail
- September 15, 1928
  - Expelled from Belgium
- February 8, 1929
  - As Jacques Voignier
    - Arrested by Brussels police
    - One month in jail
- March 1929
  - As Lafitte, in Belgium
    - Six weeks in jail
    - Deported to France
- April 8, 1929
  - As Andre Adrien Louis Prelaud
    - Arrested in Paris
    - Confidence and swindling
    - Six months in jail
- 1931
  - As Jacques Voignier
    - Confidence and swindling
- 1932
  - As Jacques Voignier
    - Confidence and swindling
- 1933
  - As Jacques Voignier
    - Confidence and swindling
- 1934
  - As Jacques Voignier
    - Confidence and swindling
- October 29, 1934
  - As Jacques Voignier, in Lille, France
    - Sentenced to 2 years in prison
    - Confidence and swindling
- January, 1934
  - As Voignier, in Paris
    - 18 months in prison
    - Confidence game
- March, 1935
  - As Jacques Voignier
    - Sentenced to 2 years in prison
    - Confidence and swindling
- January 27, 1938
  - As Dr. P.F. Devilliers, in Detroit, Michigan
    - Pretending to be a mining engineer from Johannesburg
- July 19, 1938
  - As Joseph Pierre St. Germain, in New York City
    - Grand Larceny (Case dismissed)
- January 31, 1946
  - As Pierre Lafitte
    - Failure to register for the Selective Service (Acquitted)
- October 1946
  - As Cecil Downs, in Los Angeles
    - Arrested by LA County Sheriffs
    - Writing bad checks (Case dismissed)
- October 1946
  - As Jacques Voignier, in Los Angeles
    - Arrested by INS
    - Detained for violating immigration law
- February 6, 1946
  - As Lafitte, in New York City
    - Arrested by NYPD
    - Grand larceny charges (Case dismissed)
- June 29, 1950
  - As Pierre Lafitte, in Van Nuys, California
    - Arrested in connection with theft of automobile
    - Standing NYC fugitive warrant
- March 5, 1951
  - As Jacques Voignier, in New York City
    - Arrested by FBI
    - Illegal entry into the United States
- December, 1969
  - As Jacques Voignier, in New Orleans
    - Arrested by the FBI
    - Diamond smuggling (Case dismissed)
