= Louis Lyon =

Parisian restauranteur and gangster

Roi de la Droga, Kingpin of Paris Louis Lyon
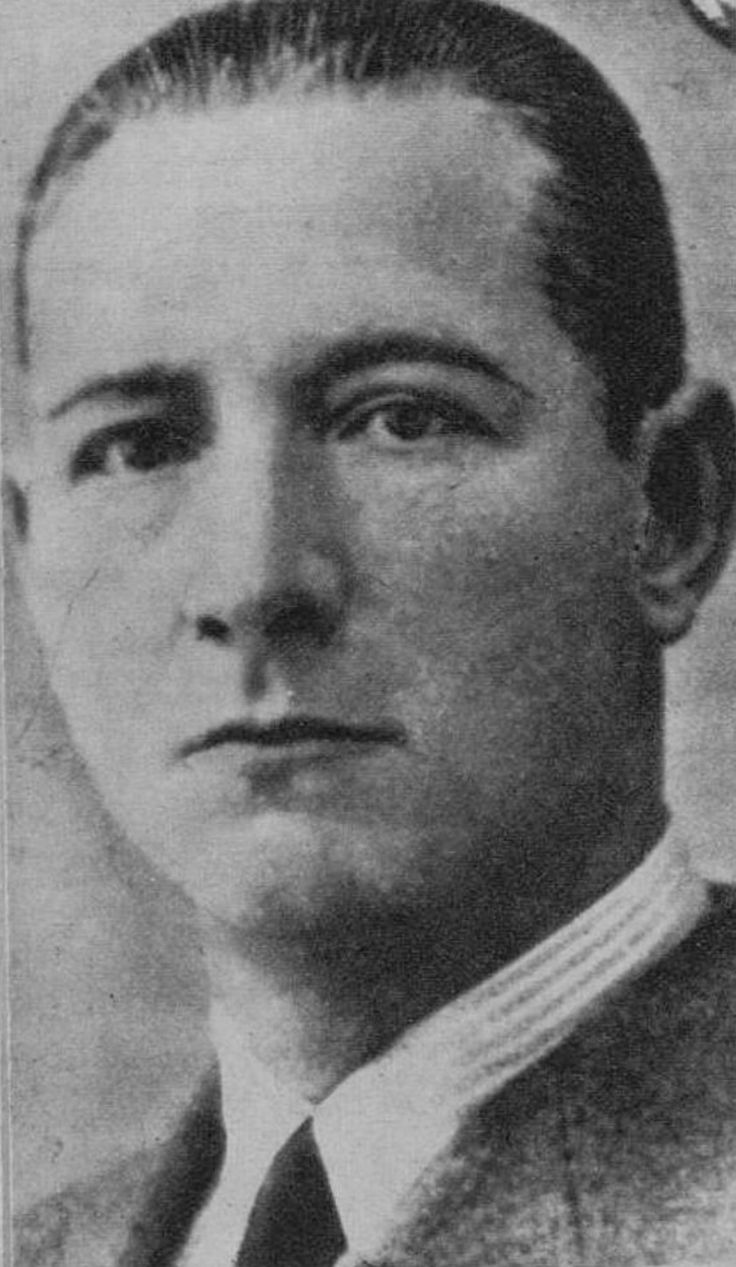
- Born: Louis-Théodore Lion; March 4th, 1888; 14e Arrondissement, Paris, France
- Died: Unknown
- Spouse: Françoise Cazenave
- Relatives: Mistress: Miss Thomas, his secretary Father: François Lyon
- Military career
- Branch: Deuxième Bureau; French Resistance
- Conflicts: World War I; World War II
- Awards: Legion of Honor

Louis Théodore François Lyon (or Lion) was a prominent restaurateur and member of the Parisian social elite, who owned a popular restaurant on Rue Boissy-d'Anglas. During World War I, Lyon was employed by the Deuxième Bureau and was involved heavily in running guns for the French military. Lyon then entered into the French criminal underworld, becoming a prominent gangster and drug dealer in the years of Interwar France. He was a close associate of the Drug Barons of Europe, a group of brothers led by Elias Eliopoulos. In that network, he would come to be known as the Roi de la Droga, or the Drug Kingpin of Paris. The network of the Drug Barons of Europe is considered by historians to be the predecessor of the French Connection. Despite his repeated implication in trafficking operations and his reputation in contemporary accounts as a leading figure in the narcotics trade, Lyon frequently avoided prosecution, unlike many of his associates who received extensive prison sentences. He was eventually prosecuted in Paris in the trial that was known in the Parisian press as L'Affair Lyon, or the Lyon Affair. This was a trial that was covered in most of the French newspapers of the era, but he was released from prison before the Battle of France. During World War II, Lyon served in the French Resistance, arranging a resistance mission against the Abwehr II which killed Lyon's main rival, the gangster and Nazi collaborator Paul Carbone. For Lyon's actions in the French Resistance, he was awarded the Legion of Honour.

The newspaper Paris-soir writes:

"Louis Lyon is, moreover, a very strange figure in this milieu. Rich in millions, he led a peaceful existence in a bourgeois apartment on Rue de la Pompe. Never in name only in a "delicate affair," while for many he presides only over the destiny of a very Parisian restaurant, for those in the know, in the shadows, he presides over the drug trade throughout the 'Butte.' "

== Career as a restaurateur (1909 onward) ==
In 1909, Lyon married into the Paris restaurant world through his marriage to his wife, Françoise Casenave. Her brother, Jean Casenave, was a successful restaurateur and wine merchant originally from Lasseube, Béarn, who had built his reputation by opening a restaurant at 11 Rue Saint-Anne, before relocating on April 10, 1925, to 39 Rue Boissy-d’Anglas, near the Madeleine and Place Vendôme.

The establishment, which was also called Jean Casenave, attracted a political and literary clientele from the upper echelons of the Parisian elite, including visitors such as Jean Giraudoux and Abel Hermant, and was recalled fondly by Maurice Martin du Gard in his memoirs. In 1923, journalist Maurice Privat conceived the idea for his first radio news program there on a cocktail napkin. The establishment was also the setting for a 1934 meeting between Maurice Martin du Gard, director of Les Nouvelles littéraires, and the writer Jean Giraudoux following negative critical reception of one of Giraudoux's works.

When Jean Casenave died suddenly in January 1932, ownership of Jean Casenave passed to Lyon, who placed its day-to-day management in the hands of Victor Casenave, Jean's brother. Victor Casenave and Lyon were not just stepbrothers, but were close friends.

The restaurant continued to operate under the Jean Casenave name long after World War II ended. Even into the 1940s, the restaurant Jean Casenave catered to locals and tourists alike, with some meals reaching 500 francs per plate. After the Second World War, the restaurant continued to attract an affluent clientele, and it was even used by Pierre Wertheimer and Félix Amiot to relaunch their business activities after the Liberation.

=== Château de Gressy ===
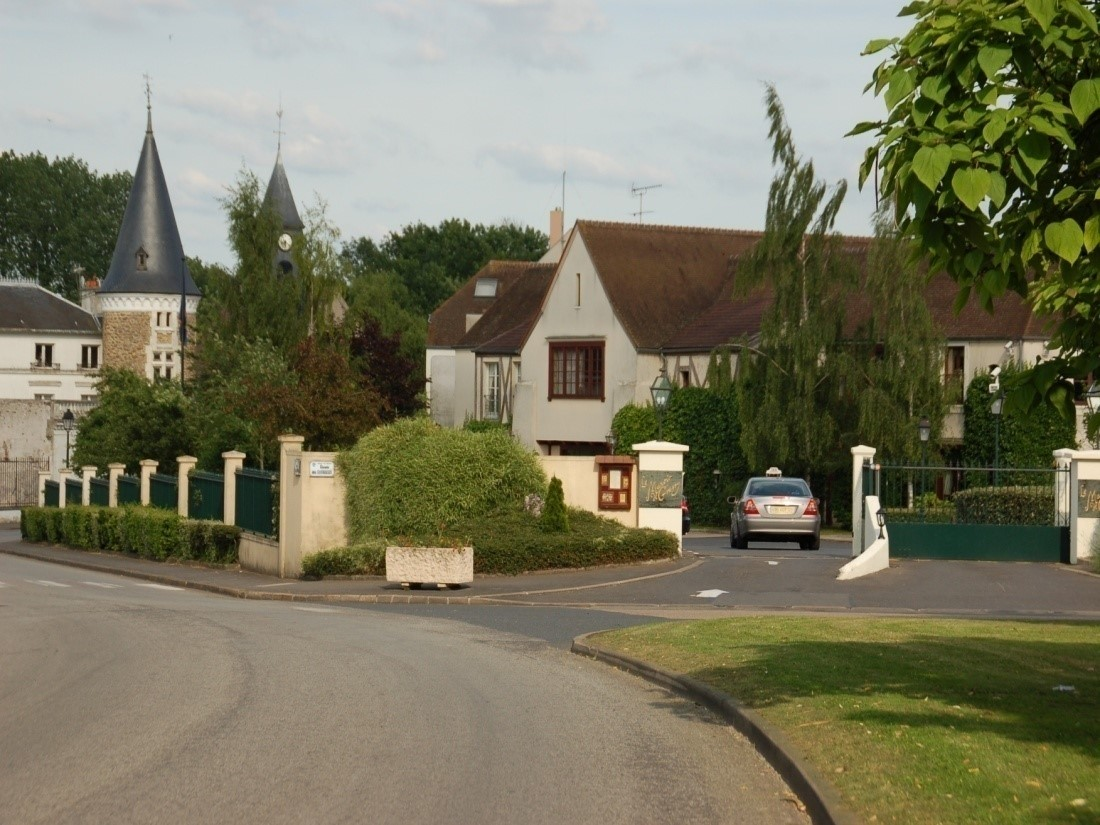
Gressy Manor, formerly part of the Château complex, is today a 4-star hotel with a gourmet restaurant.

Lyon also became the proprietor of the Château de Gressy, a former 17th-century fortified farm with several buildings, including an axial tower, and manor castle in the town of Gressy, Seine-et-Marne that served as a secondary residence for the family. Château de Gressy was located about thirty minutes from Paris by car. By the 1930s, his net worth was in the millions.

Scandals also surrounded Lyon's activities in Montmartre. He was said to have affairs, and he frequented the cabarets found throughout the French capital. It was later reported by journalists that he had a mistress away from home named Miss Thomas, who was also his personal business secretary.

== World War I and initial service in the French intelligence services (1910's) ==
Lyon's activities shortly before the breakout of World War I place him as a professional gambler in the gambling densof Europe, and especially Vienna, where he became associated with high rollers and swindlers. He was known as a con artist and a card shark. Some accounts place him as a racetrack bookmaker.

Lyon, however much his reputation as a member of the criminal underworld proceeded him, was under official cover at this time as a member of the Deuxième Bureau, the French military intelligence agency. It is as-yet unknown when Lyon officially joined the Bureau, but it is known that the French government was collecting intelligence from Lyon on the ethnic German community living in Vienna at this time.

One of those high rollers in Vienna was a Peruvian named Carlos Fernández Bácula, who was living off of his father's money, having had escaped to Vienna at the outbreak of the shooting war. Lyon then brought Bácula with him to the town of Thessaloniki, Greece, where the pair of men met another arms dealer named Elias Eliopoulos, who was purchasing arms on behalf of the Greek military at the time.

When hostilities intensified, Lyon continued to work secret missions for the Bureau, traveling between the frontlines and other European states. His primary assignment after some time was to negotiate arms deals on behalf of the French military. On the frontlines, Lyon also served with his stepbrother, Victor Casenave.

After the war ended, Carlos Bácula joined the Peruvian Ministry of Foreign Affairs. In 1923, Lyon and the Bureau involved Bácula in an arms deal to purchase guns, illegally, for the government of Peru.

== Career in illegal narcotics trafficking (1920's – 1938) ==
The first transatlantic narcotics networks began to appear shortly after the war, and Lyon was involved in several of the smaller nascent networks. Lyon formed a relationship around this time with an Italian-French-American criminal network involving Arnold Rothstein, Paul Carbone, Lucky Luciano, and August Del Gracio. The United States was a central destination for this trade. Since 1915, drugs produced in the Near East and processed in Switzerland and Austriahad been shipped through France and redirected across the Atlantic. By 1928, two rival syndicates competed for dominance in the American market: the Newman brothers, represented in Paris by August Del Gracio and Lyon, and a group led by Albert Spitzer and Fleishman. The profitability of the traffic was substantial; a kilogram of heroin valued at 12,000 francs in Paris could sell for 25,000 francs in New York.

However, there were no true kings of the narcotics trade until the 1926 arrival of three Greek brothers; George, Elias, and Nassos Eliopoulos, collectively known as the Drug Barons of Europe. These brothers organized operations that transported opium from the Shanghai French Concession and French Indochina (where the colonial government operated the Opium Regie) to French alkaloid factories, where it was refined into heroin. The product was then distributed internationally, first back to China, and later to the United States.

Lyon was first mentioned in telegrams of the Opium Advisory Committee (OAC) in 1928, shortly after an incident in New York City involving Carlos Fernández Bácula and a deceased Vienna-based gangster. The investigation had been launched following the death of Wilhelm Koffler in a hotel room, who had been a member of a small Jewish and Russian émigré criminal network in Vienna. The New York City Police Department ruled that Koffler had committed suicide, but most of the world's narcotics enforcement community concluded that the gangster was most likely killed by Legs Diamond (although the Nazis later heavily suggested that the assassin was a member of the Jewish-American mafia). The investigation in Vienna eventually connected Lyon to their case.

In his annual report for the year 1932, Russell Pasha provided information on Lyon. Thomas Wentworth Russell, that famous Pasha of the Cairo police department and the Egyptian Narcotics Bureau, had uncovered a heroin processing factory in Iran that he was convinced was undoubtedly owned by Louis Lyon. Russell Pasha had also been in communication with Harry J. Anslinger concerning the activities of another gangster in the network named August Del Gracio.

Lyon's associations extended into legal and political circles. Throughout the 1930s, Lyon is recorded in shipping manifests as arriving in Quebec and New York City. In 1935, he traveled to the United States accompanied by his attorney Lionel de Tastes, a former deputy in the French Chamber of Deputies.

Lyon's opium was processed into heroin for both domestic distribution and export. Part of the supply was handled within France through accomplices, while a significant share was directed to the United States, which represented the principal market. Accounts indicated that Lyon relied on associates, including Carlos Fernández Bacula, who was said to have used diplomatic channels to facilitate transport. Other foreign diplomats were also reported to have been implicated in the trade, including two diplomats also from Peru.

In the United States, distribution was attributed to the Newman brothers (Charles, George, and Harry) whose original family name was Neidicht. They were reported to have controlled a chain of hotels that served as a front for laundering proceeds. Their network supplied organized crime groups in Chicago and Texas and also received shipments from Chinese sources via merchant vessels. The Newman's operation had reportedly been active since the years following the First World War and expanded in profitability after the repeal of Prohibition in 1934.

=== Paris heroin factory and 1935 arrest ===
In the beginning of Lyon's involvement in the narcotics trade, Lyon's role was primarily as an intermediary, handling drug transactions without physically managing shipments. He became much more involved, however, with the purchasing of properties, warehouses, and heroin laborities around Europe and Asia. Seeking greater profits, he arranged for the creation of a clandestine heroin laboratory in a pavilion at 220Faubourg Saint-Honoré in Paris. Together with Bacula, he employed the Bulgarian chemists known as the Anavis brothers: Isaac and Benjamin Anavi. Employees were required to remain inside the facility during production to maintain secrecy.

The heroin processing factory was directly across the street from the Paris headquarters of the Ministry for Europe and Foreign Affairs.

In 1935, the factory was destroyed following an accidental explosion when one of the chemists lit a cigarette near containers of hydrochloric acid and acetone. The blast exposed the existence of the clandestine laboratory, described by the French police at the time as one of the largest heroin production sites ever uncovered in France. Investigators reported finding around thirty kilograms of heroin in cast-iron containers. The Anavi brothers were also severely injured in the blast. After the explosion, the Anavi brothers were taken directly to the Château de Gressy, where they were treated for their wounds.

In order to deflect responsibility, Lyon and his circle agreed that the Armenian gangster Georges Chébat, a close associate, would take full blame and identify a fictitious accomplice. Chébat was named as the tenant of the damaged building, and attempted to present his activities as connected to the film industry. Chebat and Benjamin Anavis were sentenced to eighteen months’ imprisonment and fined 5,000 francs, while Lyon avoided conviction.

Lyon was expected to cover the financial penalties imposed on Chébat, but when he failed to do so, Chébat secretly informed both the French police and the American embassy of Lyon's role in the operation. Chébat also alleged that Lyon's lawyer, de Tastes, acted as an accomplice in Lyon's activities, a claim de Tastes denied before launching a defamation complaint.

According to Russell Pasha, much of the production of the Istanbul factory was reserved for Lyon, who stored narcotics in Paris before reselling them to buyers from New York and Shanghai. At the same time, he was identified as a business associate of the American trafficker Del Gracio, who was later arrested in Paris. Lyon was further suspected of establishing a clandestine laboratory in Paris to process raw materials imported from the Near East. Although equipment linked to him was discovered, Lyon successfully argued in court that he did not know its intended purpose.

Publicly, Lyon was mentioned in the case but was not prosecuted at that time, benefiting from a dismissal. In reality, Lyon had paid off most of the police force in his district. He had maintained an ongoing and direct relationship with members of the Sûreté nationale, turning evidence against his rivals in the narcotics trade. He later claimed responsibility for denouncing Eliopoulos and his brothers, revealing that the Eliott frères bank in Paris was used as a front for their transactions. Lyon considered this service a source of protection, believing it rendered him less vulnerable to prosecution.

=== Spying on the Nazis during the interwar years ===
At this time, there was also an undercover operative for the United States Customs Service and the Office of Naval Intelligence (ONI), who had been operating heavily in Europe, uncovering the threads of Lyon's narcotics network. The operative's name was Al Scharff. His wife, Ida Nussbaum, was related by blood and marriage to Léon Blum. Scharff discovered that Lyon was protected by members of his own government, and had been allowed to operate without investigation. Scharff was then tasked by the American Ambassador to France, William Christian Bullitt Jr. to infiltrate the branch of the Sûreté that was protecting Lyon in order to discover why he was so protected.

Scharff then discovered that French intelligence had never stopped using Lyon as an operative after the end of the First World War. Especially Marx Dormoy used Lyon as a counterintelligence operative against Nazi Germany. Lyon reported extensively on their movements in the narcotics networks of Vienna, Paris, Marseille, and elsewhere.

Of particular interest to Scharff was Lyon's relationship with Paul Carbone, the leader of a large gang in Marseille. Carbone at this time had already developed a similar style of relationship with the Gestapo and the Abwehr, reporting on the movements of Jews throughout Europe.

=== Arrest and trial of 1938 ===
In 1937, the American narcotics trafficker Jacob Gottlieb was arrested at the U.S.–Canadian border with forty kilograms of heroin. After committing suicide in prison that July, Gottlieb left a notebook implicating various associates, including Angelo "Jerry the Loog" Landosco and Leo Weiss, both of whom were linked to the Parisian trade. Lyon had previous dealings with Landosco, who was involved in recovering a large shipment of heroin stolen from Lyon's network.

In 1938, Swiss authorities in Zurich arrested Peruvian diplomat Carlos Fernández Bacula and allegedly seized several kilograms of heroin in his possession. He was living in a psychiatric hospital at the time, having voluntarily admitted himself due to feelings of intensified paranoia. The Swiss authorities, however, would not grant the extradition request of the Nazis to have Bácula sent to Germany. The Zurich arrest caught Bacula in possession of narcotics, after which he provided information about the network, including the activities of Louis Lyon.

In June 1938, Lyon was arrested in Paris on the order of the investigating judge Thévenin, and charged with drug trafficking. The proceedings were the culmination of nearly a decade of reports and investigations that had identified him as one of the key intermediaries in the international heroin trade. Paris police officials, including Commissioner Georges Albayez and the inspectors Clavel, Blanc-Garin, and Métra, pursued the case as part of wider efforts against the city's role as a center of global narcotics trafficking.

According to period newspapers, Lyon's ability to conduct his activities for an extended period was facilitated by protection from elements within the French domestic intelligence services, particularly the Sûreté 62.

Evidence presented at trial showed that Lyon's organization conducted correspondence using coded language. Paris was referred to as “Louisville,” Berlin as “Ratber,” Prague as “Ratpra,” and heroin was described as “cloth.” Chemists were nicknamed “pastry chefs,” while steamships on the New York route were identified by numbers. The Faubourg Saint-Honoré laboratory was reported to have prepared as much as 80 kilograms of heroin intended for export to the United States.

Lyon was tried before the 10th Chamber of the Paris court. He denied being a trafficker but admitted to having worked as an informer. His co-defendants included Carlos Fernández Bácula, Georges Chébat, Peretti, Kléoboulos “Clovis” Vafiadis, Mireille Moreau, and the brothers Toledo and René Thomas. Peretti, who already had multiple convictions, was described as a warehouseman within the trade. Vafiadis, a Greek trafficker who became an informer after a personal dispute, accused Moreau of succeeding him as courier, an allegation she denied. Toledo and Thomas were accused of procuring chemicals and supporting the laboratory's operations.

The newspaper L'Illustration Nouvelle writes:

"Among the discoveries made by the police, this one should be mentioned. The restaurateur Lyon owned a chemical factory for the transformation of opium leaves into cocaine and heroin, on the border between Bulgaria and Yugoslavia. Every time a police raid was ordered in Bulgaria, on the Lyon factory, the narcotics were transported to the part of the factory located in Yugoslavia and vice versa. In this way, the authorities were fooled for a very long time."

Investigators also traced Lyon's activities to Belgrade, where he obtained supplies through the trafficker Towazowitch, a former railway employee dismissed in 1913 for opium smuggling. Towazowitch, despite repeated arrests for narcotics offenses between 1931 and 1933, later presented himself as a banker while continuing illicit dealings. Lyon was regarded as one of his principal buyers, reselling narcotics to American contacts.

At the time of the proceedings, French narcotics law was based on a 1916 statute regulating toxic substances. The law provided for penalties of 6 months to 2 years in prison, along with fines. As a result, Lyon and his accomplices faced a maximum of 2 years imprisonment, in stark contrast to the United States, where equivalent crimes carried terms of 15 to 20 years. French authorities were considering reforms that would increase penalties to between two and five years and prohibit convicted traffickers from residing in key cities such as Paris, Le Havre, and Marseille.

== World War II and career in the French Resistance ==
His sentencing, which had been scheduled for two years, was quickly interrupted. Shortly before the French entry into World War II, Lyon was credited with exposing an arms cache belonging to the Cagoulards, a clandestine far-right organization modeled on fascist movements. During the war, he provided information to the French Resistance regarding German intelligence agents who attempted to infiltrate Resistance networks under the guise of anti-Nazi sympathizers. Several of these agents were subsequently apprehended.

During the war, his work for the French Resistance intensified. He killed his former associate, Paul Carbone, by organizing a mission to derail the train that Carbone was riding on, and also killed several of his other former associates who had allied themselves with the Nazis and German intelligence. Upon the death of Carbone, François Spirito fled to Madrid. After the Liberation, the French government awarded Lyon the Legion of Honor. It is currently unknown how much Lyon was involved with Operation Underworld, but one of his close confederates was August Del Gracio, who initially organized the operation with the Federal Bureau of Narcotics (FBN).
