= Elias Eliopoulos =

Prominent 20th century gangster and mine owner

- Ηλίας Ηλιόπουλος
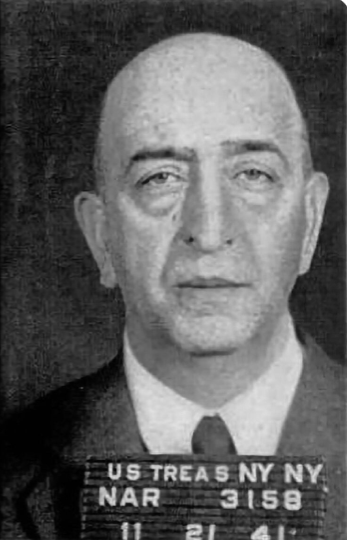
- Born: February 11, 1894; Piraeus, Greece
- Died: August 28, 1954 (aged 60); Greece
- Education: Robert College

Elias "Elie" Eliopoulos was a Greek smuggler who was, alongside his brothers George and Ananassius (Nassos), one of the most prominent and important organized crime members and drug traffickers of the early 20th century, maintaining connections with the Greek mafia, Corsican mafia, Turkish mafia, Italian-American Mafia, and Italian Mafia. The brothers eventually became known as the Drug Barons of Europe, taking the highest positions in Unione Corse in Marseille and Paris in the 1920's and 30's. Elias Eliopoulos was the head of the family. Their organized narcotics and drugs network spanned the globe, from China to California via Afghanistan, Turkey, London, and New York. Historians suggest that when the Eliopoulos Brothers were at their peak in the 1930's, they were the largest narcotics and drugs network in the entire world. Eliopoulos was made one of the most wanted people by many of the world's leading narcotics bureaus, including the Central Narcotics Bureau of the Egyptian Government, and the Federal Bureau of Narcotics (FBN), and was especially hunted by Malcolm Delevingne, Harry J. Anslinger, and Russell Pasha. He mentored many of the more famous gangsters that followed, including August Del Gracio, Jacques Voignier, and Paul Carbone. In effect, the Drug Barons of Europe are considered the spiritual grandfathers of Carbone's French Connection. In a 1943 Life magazine article, journalist Gerard Piel described the brothers’ criminal enterprise as functioning like a “central bank and clearing house” for a large portion of the world’s illicit trade in opium, morphine, and heroin.

When describing the network of the Drug Barons of Europe, the French magazine Détective wrote:

"From Japan to New York, via Marseille! From the skyscrapers of Broadway to the plains of Manchuria! From the docks of Hamburg to the pyramids of Egypt! From the Bosphorous to the Champs-Élysées. There is something for everyone. The setting is as vast as the universe.

Now animate this famous selection of images with the magical names of the modern age: export, import, orders, bills of lading, invoices, telegrams, banks, palaces, and telephone! All of this will find its place here.

Boats, sleeping cars and planes will not be too much either. Everything that circulates in space, everything that connects countries to each other, across borders, will be used: this great black and white liner that goes up the Red Sea; this express with blue cars that runs along the Nishava pass in Bulgaria; this plane that flies over the stone spires of Strasbourg; this fast ship that, with all lights out, glides over the sleeping waters..."

== Early life ==
Elias Eliopoulos was born in Piraeus, Greece, and was the son of a prominent Greek diplomat who was stationed in Turkey for some time.

== Criminal empire (c. 1912 – 1943) ==
=== Rise ===
Elias Eliopoulos got his start in the world of organized crime by selling weapons to the Greek army during World War I. During the war, he encountered two minor arms dealers in the town of Thessaloniki. The men were by the names of Louis-Théodore Lyon and Carlos Fernández Bácula. In 1918, Eliopoulos "tested the waters in France," and made his first recorded narcotics deal, but shortly afterward wound up in prison for a month.

At the conclusion of the war, Eliopoulos migrated to Paris, where in 1926, he got back into the world of drugs and narcotics. At the height of the Great Depression, Elie Eliopoulos was facing financial difficulties and met with David Gourievidis (also known as David Gourevitch), a Russian émigré who had settled in Greece. Gourievidis took him under his wing and introduced him to the profitability of the drug trade in China, where he claimed to have connections. The two traveled to Tianjin, a key commercial hub in northern China, and later returned with a more ambitious plan.

On their second visit to Tianjin, Gourievidis and Eliopoulos connected with Jean Voyatzis, a fellow Greek and the leader of a local smuggling ring operating from the French Concession. Eliopoulos's contribution to the emerging enterprise was his access to manufactured narcotics such as heroin and morphine. He established himself in Paris and secured deals with two licensed French producers, the Comptoir des alcaloïdes and the Société industrielle de chimie organique, to serve as suppliers. He gained the appearance of legitimacy by presenting himself as a businessman and associating with elite social circles. Eliopoulos's organization reportedly included a wide range of collaborators: sailors, smugglers, former diplomats, and members of organized crime groups. His distribution network in the United States allegedly involved known criminal figures such as Arthur "Dutch Schultz" Flegenheimer and Louis "Lepke" Buchalter.

The famous restauranteur Louis Lyon, however, was wary of a Greek family taking over his town. Before the Eliopoulos brothers got to town, he had designs to become the boss of Paris, in what was only known then as the "Franco-Italian-American" organization. Lyon was a proud Frenchman, and he didn't want a foreigner taking his future empire. But when Elias Eliopoulos managed to secure his sources and establish his manufacturing plants, Lyon's power status was challenged. Within five years, Eliopoulos would be running Paris with a personal net worth of 70 million dollars, dwarfing in global scale the neighborhood gang that Lyon managed, and Lyon would become one of his trusted couriers. Lyon, thanks to Eliopoulos' mentorship and guidance (though the police forces of Europe didn't know his real name) would come to be known as "Roi de La Droga," (The King of Drugs).

Marcel Montarro for Détective wrote:

"Elie Eliopoulos is the prototype of these invulnerable drug kings. He was the boss, and if it dare say, the godfather of Lyon, and in the world of illicit trafficking, is symbolic in this regard... Elie Eliopoulos was truly the world's first drug kingpin."

George, Nassos, and Elie Eliopoulos, gained prominence in European high society. Known for their extravagant lifestyle, the brothers were fixtures at elite resorts across the French and Italian Rivieras. Elie Eliopoulos was the most prominent of the three and the head of the family. In Paris, he cultivated a public image as a well-dressed man-about-town and part of the modern aristocracy, often seen in Parisian cafés with his signature gold-handled cane. He had a taste for luxury and all of the items that came with it, including champagne, opera, gambling, and lavish dinners.

Beginning in 1928, Eliopoulos arranged for opium shipments from China to France, sometimes using legal means and at other times concealing the cargo in mislabeled containers (e.g., marked as "tea"). He sold this opium to the manufacturers at discounted rates, and the refined narcotics were then smuggled back to Tianjin or directed toward other markets, including the United States.

By 1928, the brothers were supplying high-grade narcotics to prominent American drug distributors, including organized crime figures such as Charles “Lucky” Luciano. According to historians at the U.S. Drug Enforcement Administration (DEA), the Eliopoulos brothers pioneered a tactic later known as the “double deal,” in which, as soon as they felt their buyers were growing too quickly, they informed authorities about them in order to eliminate future competition.

Gerard Piel for Life wrote:

The Eliopoulos brothers very quickly adapted themselves to the new circumstances of their business. One New York broker failed to come through on a transaction and was cultivating his Broadway reputation with the proceeds; they arranged, across the Atlantic, to have three Corsicans give him a public beating in a speakeasy. At the same remote distance they regularly negotiated the betrayal of large prepaid shipments to the U. S. customs. They went so far as to ruin their best U. S. dealers, the Bernstein brothers, who had grown too prosperous on a six-day schedule of shipments between Cherbourg and New York. Samuel Bernstein is still in jail.

In 1930, the Eliopoulos network financed a covert drug laboratory in Turkey. Their trafficking route spanned from Turkey and China to France, and from there to the United States. That same year, authorities intercepted a shipment aboard the SS Alesia from Istanbul to Brooklyn, seizing 17,500 cans labeled “Furs,” each concealing an ounce of morphine. Despite this, Elias, operating from Athens, expressed confidence that he was beyond the reach of American law enforcement. He boasted to an FBN agent the details of his Chinese contacts and projected an annual volume of narcotics reaching the United States in multiple tons.

At the peak of his operations, Elie Eliopoulos was exporting an estimated 300 kilograms (approximately 660 pounds) of refined narcotics each month to China alone. These shipments reportedly earned him around $50,000 per month, transferred from Tianjin through American Express. Within a single year, Eliopoulos had established a wide-reaching network of agents operating in numerous countries, including China, France, the United States, Egypt, Turkey, Greece, the United Kingdom, Germany, the Netherlands, and Italy.

Eliopoulos’s influence extended into official circles. In Paris, he secured protection from a police inspector known as "Zani" (Inspector Martin of the Préfecture de police), whom he paid initially 5,000 and later 10,000 French francs monthly. In exchange, Eliopoulos agreed to refrain from selling narcotics within France and offered intelligence on rival traffickers.

Despite the scale of his operations, Eliopoulos initially avoided prosecution. His case eventually attracted the attention of the League of Nations’ Advisory Committee on Traffic in Opium and Other Dangerous Drugs (OAC), following a formal complaint by FBN Commissioner Harry Anslinger. While the French government later expressed regret over the situation, Eliopoulos remained effectively immune from legal consequences during this period.

=== Decline ===
The downfall of Elie Eliopoulos's international trafficking operation began in 1931, triggered by a series of destabilizing events. His partnership with David Gourievidis unraveled, possibly due to a personal dispute or Gourievidis's growing concerns about police scrutiny. Especially due to the fact that he lost a volume of opium in Shanghai worth £50,000, in an operation that he suspected was not accidental. In response, Gourievidis approached the Paris authorities, and news of the network reached the press. The resulting publicity compromised Eliopoulos’s protection from the Paris police. Eliopoulos had paid off the French police, and was given protection by high ranking officials, so movement was not immediately made on their part. Eventually, however, Louis-Théodore Lyon saw weakness in his organization, and wanted him out of the way. Lyon paid the French police even more money toward that end. The gangsters who had invented the double deal had been double dealt twice themselves.

At the same time, American mobster August "Little Augie" Del Gracio, a known client of the Eliopoulos network, was arrested in Hamburg while receiving a shipment of approximately 250 kilograms (550 pounds) of morphine disguised in machinery parts. The incident appeared to involve a failed double-cross: Del Gracio's shipment had reportedly been diverted and declared stolen, only for him to be approached by an intermediary offering the same quantity of morphine from an identical source. The investigation eventually led police from Del Gracio to a woman in Berlin, and from her to an Afghan national connected to Eliopoulos’s network.

The decisive blow came with the seizure of a coded notebook belonging to Jean Voyatzis, a key figure in the network. Voyatzis had been under surveillance and was intercepted while traveling from China to Greece. British officials in Cairo, alerted to his movements, informed Egyptian authorities. As Voyatzis traveled from Port Said to Alexandria, his baggage, transported separately, was thoroughly searched by Russell Pasha’s narcotics unit. Among his possessions was a small notebook containing encrypted correspondence and detailed information on the trafficking operation.

Described by officials as more valuable than "gold or rubies," the notebook revealed the identities of network members operating in China and Japan, the Eliopoulos brothers, Gourievidis, various buyers, transport contacts, and industrial suppliers. Armed with this intelligence, authorities were able to intercept further drug shipments.

Eliopoulos, having briefly been detained in Mannheim in connection with the Hamburg case (but released due to insufficient evidence), fled to Athens. In a surprising move, he contacted Russell Pasha directly, offering to disclose the full extent of the operation in a private meeting with an appointed agent. He expressed willingness to cooperate with investigators, resulting in a wave of prosecutions in France. The most prominent was the 1938–1939 trial of Louis-Théodore Lyon, which attracted public attention due to the high-profile nature of the witnesses, including figures from aristocracy, the arts, and religious communities. One ploy involved smuggling heroin disguised as "sacred sand" sent with religious books.

Despite the disruption of Eliopoulos’s operation, subsequent reports suggested that elements of his network continued to function under new leadership. The broader impact of the trade was visible in cities across North America, where the narcotics trade persisted.

Officially considered "retired," in the business after being released from prison, Eliopoulos and his brothers went into the nascent Greek mining industry, notably investing in bauxite, barite, bentonite, pearlite, and gold mines. Their largest mining company was called Bauxites Parnasse S.A., in which they owned many bauxite deposits near Mount Parnassus.

When the Nazis invaded Greece in 1941, Eliopoulos allegedly reported to the Nazis that his former mentor, David Gourisvidis, was a "Jewish traitor." The Nazis acted accordingly. However, the brothers George and Elie soon realized they could not stay in Europe while it was occupied by the Nazis, and they fled to the United States, where they were promptly arrested by FBN special agents George Hunter White, Charlie Dryar, and Charlie Siragusa, as the brothers arrived at customs. They were convincted in Brooklyn, but were out of prison three months later, their conviction being overturned do to the fact that most of the evidence submitted to the court was beyond the statue of limitations. Nasso managed to evade capture.

Louis Lyon, meanwhile, who had joined the French Resistance, arranged the assassination of his former underling Paul Carbone. This forced Carbone's lieutenant, François Spirito, to flee to Spain. Spirito soon became the new head of the French Connection.

== Mining empire (1947 – death) ==
By 1947, the brothers had returned to postwar Greece and resumed operations in the mining sector. However, during the postwar reconstruction period, American financial and industrial aid (especially programs focused on securing strategic materials) was primarily directed toward the Greek Chemical Products and Fertilizers Company of the Bodosakis Group and the Skalistris Group’s bauxite mines. In 1950, Charles Siragusa was dispatched to Greece to investigate Eliopoulos, who had applied for Marshall Plan funding to develop a gold mine in northern Greece—an area also known for poppy cultivation. Upon his arrival in Athens, Siragusa established contact with CIA station chief Tom Karamessines. Siragusa provided intelligence on Eliopoulos’s background, while Karamessines facilitated local outreach. As a result of their cooperation, reports of Iliopoulos’s criminal history surfaced in the Greek press. The ensuing scandal led to the denial of his Marshall Plan request. As a result, the Eliopoulos brothers' Bauxites Parnasse S.A. remained inactive into 1955.

In the aftermath, Eliopoulos shifted to stock market manipulation and arms trafficking to Israel.

The landscape changed in 1960 with the founding of the Pechiney alumina and aluminum plant, which significantly revitalized the Greek bauxite industry. Nevertheless, before the refinery became operational, concerns were raised about the premature extraction and export of bauxite. In February 1962, Aluminium de Grèce, a Pechiney subsidiary, entered into a long-term contract with the Barlos Brothers Company to secure 4.725 million tons of bauxite between 1965 and 1983. Following government intervention, the company also reached an agreement with Bauxites Parnasse to purchase 175,000 tons of bauxite annually for 30 years at competitive rates.

By 1970, the company had grown to supply 60% of Greece's external exports of bauxite.

Their parent company, Elipoulos Brothers Limited, eventually changed its name to MOTODYNAMICS S.A.
