= Upper World =

Upper World and similar may refer to:

In mythology:

- Upper World (Greek), in Greek mythology, the land where people live, as opposed to the Underworld
- Upper World ("Heaven"), in Hungarian mythology, where the gods and good souls live
- the Upper World, where the Aiy (benevolent spirits) live, in Yakut mythology

In religion:

- Urdhva Loka, the upper world, in Jain cosmology
- the Seven Logas or Upper Worlds of Ayyavazhi (a Hindu sect) mythology

Other:

- Upper World (film), a 1934 drama starring Warren William and Ginger Rogers

== See also ==
- Overworld (disambiguation)
- Underworld (disambiguation)
