= Pierre Laffitte =

Pierre Laffitte may refer to:

- Pierre Laffitte (philosopher)
- Pierre Laffitte (politician)

== See also ==
- Pierre Lafitte, pirate
- Pierre Lafitte Ithurralde, Basque writer
- Pierre Lafitte (journalist), French journalist
- Pierre LaFitte, French-American criminal and spy
