= Carlos Fernández Bácula =

Peruvian diplomat and smuggler

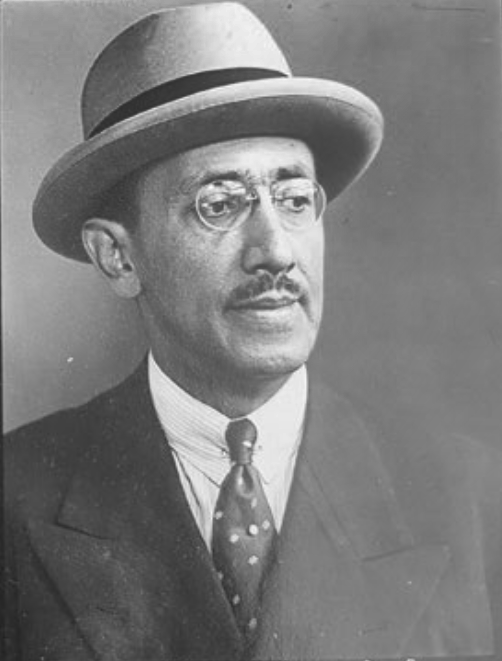

Junior Consular Officer
- In office 1918–1924
- Diplomatic Service: Peruvian Ministry of Foreign Affairs
- Embassy: Geneva

Consular and Charge d'Affairs
- In office 1924–1930
- Diplomatic Service: Peruvian Ministry of Foreign Affairs
- Embassy: Vienna

Charge d'Affairs
- In office 1930–1931
- Diplomatic Service: Peruvian Ministry of Foreign Affairs
- Embassy: Oslo

Personal details
- Born: March 11, 1888 Lima, Peru
- Died: Unknown
- Spouse: Anita Bacula
- Education: Institut auf dem Rosenberg

Military service
- Allegiance: Nazi Germany
- Branch/service: Abwehr II
- Unit: Légion des volontaires français contre le bolchévisme
- Battles/wars: World War II
- Supervisors: Paul Carbone; Simon Sabiani
- Commander: Erwin von Lahousen

Carlos Fernández Bácula was a Peruvian diplomat who used his diplomatic status to become a prolific smuggler, especially trafficking in narcotics for the Drug Barons of Europe and their leader Elias Eliopoulos, and smuggling for them to Unione Corse, the Sicilian Mafia, the American Mafia, and various White Émigrés. He had no deep family affiliation or membership with any of these groups, and operated mainly as a smuggler and courier for profit, sometimes even acting as a go-between and mediator between families. Utilizing his diplomatic immunity, Bácula transported narcotics and other illicit items in his diplomatic luggage, bypassing customs inspections. According to estimates by the Federal Bureau of Narcotics (FBN), he smuggled approximately 1.5 tons of narcotics into the United States between 1928 and 1931. His success is considered one of the early models for the later successes of the French Connection.

Eventually, he would be held in suspicion by; Scotland Yard and Malcolm Delevingne, the FBN and Harry J. Anslinger, the Rotterdam police and Adriaan Hendrik Sirks, various Swiss cantonal police departments, the Sureté Nationale, the Canadian Narcotics Division and Charles Henry Ludovic Sharman, and the Egyptian Bureau of Narcotics and Russell Pasha. Imprisoned in Zurich on charges of trafficking in heroin in 1938, he was living in Nazi concentration camp for "undesirables" when the Nazis infiltrated the membership of the International Bureau of the International Criminal Police Commission during World War II, and Bácula subsequently was recruited by his old friends Paul Carbone and Simon Sabiani to become an Abwehr agent. Their initial plan was to flood North Africa with narcotics, thereby addicting the Allied forces there, and halting their advance in its tracks.

Despite the fact that he had abused his diplomatic privileges, Bácula held a lifelong dream of a free and liberal socialist democracy in Peru, and was an avid member of the Alianza Popular Revolucionaria Americana (ARPA). Historians are still researching whether his drug running was a profit mechanism for a failed Peruvian revolution. Bácula, on his part, denied ever having been a smuggler, and claimed that all charges against him were as a result of his association with ARPA, and the US government's desire to control Latin America. When he was interviewed by a United States District Attorney in 1931 about his involvement in trafficking, he claimed he had no need to do so: his family owned a large cotton plantation in Peru which he had a shared interest, and he also owned a dressmaking store in Paris, where his wife was a partner. That dressmaking store, however, was located only a block away from a heroin processing factory that was owned and operated by Louis Lyon.

== Early life ==
Carlos Fernández Bácula was born in Lima, Peru, on March 11, 1888. He was the son of a prosperous cotton merchant. On his paternal side, he is descended from Miho Bácula Jugović, a Croatian emigrant from Trpanj who settled in Peru in 1874. Around the time that Bácula was born, Peru was producing a majority of the world's pure concaine, distributed to pharmaceutical companies for use in the medical field. Lima, the capital of Peru, was the cocaine capital of the entire world when Bácula was growing up.

At the age of thirteen, Bácula moved to Germany to pursue studies in engineering. He enrolled in the Institut auf dem Rosenberg in Sankt Gallen, a prestigious and costly boarding school. He continued his studies in Darmstadt and Zürich.

== Diplomatic career and criminal activities (1914–1931) ==
=== Switzerland and arms smuggling (1914–1924) ===
With the onset of the World War I, he relocated to Switzerland, where he became associated with a French swindler and professional gambler named Louis Lyon, and somewhere in Thessaloniki, the pair interacted with a Greek arms dealer named Elias Eliopoulos. Some time after encountering Eliopoulos, Bácula wound up trafficking in arms himself.

After the war ended, and relying on financial support from his father, he joined the Peruvian Ministry of Foreign Affairs as a junior consular officer in Geneva. In 1923, he became involved in an effort to acquire firearms for his government, an operation that unbeknownst to him, had been orchestrated by a member of the Deuxième Bureau.

=== Vienna and the narcotics trade (1925–1931) ===
Circa 1925, Bácula assumed the post of Peruvian consul in Vienna. His life in Vienna was one of luxury. He carried himself and presented the image of a career diplomat, addicted to the fashions of the social elite of the city. He dressed in finely tailored suits, wore luxury local watches and timepieces, and on his head, his signature fedora. He acquired a grand residence at Rennweg 3, Vienna, III (a house formerly owned by Gustav Mahler), where he hosted opulent parties attended by members of the local elite and diplomatic corps. He was also an avid, though often unsuccessful, gambler.

His fashion sense, however, is probably also greatly in thanks to his wife Anita, who eventually became a fashion magnate and a partner in Cohen, Salti, and Co., a dressmaking factory on Rue Saint-Honoré.

During this period, he met and befriended a White Émigré named Joseph Raskin, who had fled Russia during the Russian Revolution and settled in France. Raskin, who held a major interest in a pharmaceutical plant in Mulhouse, introduced Bácula to the drugs and narcotics trade. Especially attractive to Bácula was the fact that he could make dozens the more profit moving narcotics than he could moving the same volume of weapons. Bácula officially shifted his primary product from arms to narcotics, which proved both more lucrative and logistically simpler.

Vienna was developing a reputation among drug enforcement officials as a hub of illicit narcotics activity. Its appeal to traffickers stemmed from a combination of factors: a central geographic position, a transient and diverse population, and the economic instability that followed World War I. However, the city’s greatest attraction was Austria’s lenient drug legislation, which imposed relatively mild penalties even for large-scale trafficking. The father of Vienna’s narcotics trade was Viennese pharmacist Ludwig Auer, who legally acquired pharmaceutical products and resold them for illicit export, particularly at first to Thomas Zakarian. However, the majority of traffickers operating in Vienna were foreign nationals. That same pharmaceutical company in Mulhouse that Joseph Raskin owned a majority share was owned and operated, completely legally, by Ludwig Auer. The products coming out of this factory were distributed to a community of smugglers and gangsters known as the "Raskin Ring."

Bácula's diplomatic passport made him an asset to his associates, and problematic for law enforcement, as it allowed him to carry narcotics across international borders without passing through customs. Because international traffickers relied heavily on official identification while traveling, having a diplomat within their network greatly facilitated the creation and acquisition of forged documents. Bácula later acknowledged that Raskin had pressured him to obtain a Peruvian passport, likely to assist in drug transport under an assumed identity. However, Bácula claimed he merely acted as an intermediary, contacting a colleague at the Polish consulate in Vienna to help Raskin secure a new Polish passport, less advantageous than a diplomatic one.

==== Contemporary problems in the historiography of Jewish drug dealers in Nazified Vienna ====
Despite widespread antisemitic propaganda during the interwar period, records do indeed confirm the existence of several individuals of Jewish heritage and faith who were involved in international narcotics trafficking networks based in or operating through Austria, most of whom Bácula was in close contact with. Among the better-known figures were; Sami Bernstein, Herman Blauaug, and Gabriel Munk. Others included Moses (or Leib) Weidler, Thomas Petrou Zacharian, the Polish brothers Zahnwel and Ajzyk Zellinger, Simon Lamm, Nathan Altmann, Traian Schor, and Josef Raskin. These individuals operated within broader transnational trafficking networks. For example, Hussein El Neannai, an Egyptian merchant residing in Vienna, was implicated in drug transport operations that allegedly moved shipments between Vienna, New York, and Paris, sometimes under diplomatic cover. These were the same operations that Bácula took part.

Contemporary far-right publications, including Arbeitersturm, a militant newspaper affiliated with Austria’s National Socialist labor movement, frequently exaggerated and racialized involvement in the drug trade. One 1933 article, for instance, claimed that Jews were responsible for 30% of the global narcotics trade. In Germany, similar publications asserted a decline in Jewish involvement from 24% in 1930 to 3.6% by 1936. During Berlin police raids targeting alleged drug smugglers and currency violators, 339 individuals were arrested at two establishments on Kurfürstendamm, with 317 reportedly identified as Jewish. Early records of the operation indicated that 76 of those detained had prior criminal charges, while others were listed as political suspects or undocumented foreigners.

==== The 1928 Manhattan theft (Anslinger's version) ====
In 1928, Bácula's most unfortunate incident occurred while he was attempting to move product in Manhattan. Harry Anslinger writes:

"Bacula was a weak sister in this kind of underworld; he was all right as long as others were close by to protect him. But this was not always possible – especially in the jungles of Manhattan. On one of his trips, Bacula was in a New York hotel with 150 kilos of heroin in his baggage which he was attempting to sell. Even in that day, the wholesale value was nearly $400,000. Through a member of the American mob, Bacula sent out 50 kilos to a prospective customer, holding the rest until he received his personal payoff. The messenger arrived back at the hotel shortly thereafter, his head bandaged and bloody. He stated that he had been held up and robbed.

Bacula was dismayed at his loss – and suspicious. A few days later a visitor showed up at his hotel room. "My name is Jack Diamond," the caller announced blandly. The diplomat had heard of the American gangster but was surprised at the smiling affability of the tall lean young man who asked if he might come in for a moment. "I heard about vour unfortunate loss of heroin," Legs Diamond said. "I may be able to help you get some of it back. It's a hell of a load of heroin to lose-fifty kilos. Maybe I can get it back for you. I know a lot of guys."

The historians Lauren Campbell and David Petruccelli write:

"Bácula, in Anslinger’s telling, was “a weak sister in this kind of underworld; he was all right as long as others were close by to protect him. But this was not always possible — especially in the jungles of Manhattan.” Such tough talk was typical of Anslinger, who never missed a chance to burnish his reputation as a fearless lawman in the mold of his rival, J. Edgar Hoover. But his characterization also contained a grain of truth. The kind of violence that characterized Prohibition-era America was largely unknown in Europe..."

Bácula, aware of Legs Diamond’s violent reputation and suspecting his involvement in a prior hijacking, nonetheless accepted his offer to help recover the stolen narcotics. Adopting a calm tone, Bácula expressed his willingness to cooperate, and Diamond, appearing indignant, agreed that Bácula had been deceived.

Two days later, Diamond returned with thirty kilograms of heroin, explaining that the remaining twenty had been used as a bribe, though he did not specify to whom. Bácula stored the recovered shipment in one of his trunks, but Diamond, visibly uneasy, warned that the hotel was not secure. When Bácula confirmed he was now holding 130 kilograms in total, Diamond insisted the drugs be moved to a safer location where he had reliable contacts. Despite initial hesitation, Bácula accepted the proposal, motivated both by the scale of the risk and his apprehension toward Diamond. The heroin was relocated to another hotel under the supervision of an Austrian associate linked to the European trafficking network, Wilhelm Koffler, reportedly chosen for his trustworthiness.

Koffler ultimately lost the narcotics to a group of individuals who impersonated law enforcement officers. Not long afterward, he was discovered dead in a room at the Broadway Central Hotel in Manhattan. An American associate, granted access by the hotel manager, found his body lying at the foot of the bed with his wrists and throat slashed. As the windows and door were locked from the inside, the New York City Police Department ruled the incident a suicide. However, Bácula expressed doubt. When asked about the circumstances three years later, he remarked, “I suppose they killed him,” though he declined to name a suspect, stating, “I cannot say, it is impossible.”

The heroin, 130 kilograms in total, had vanished, and its final whereabouts were never officially established.

Another document in the League of Nations files, however, identifies the hotel in which Koffler died as the Sherman Square Hotel.

==== The 1928 Manhattan theft (Tschepper's version) ====
In 1934, D. Tschepper of the Federal Police Headquarters in Vienna transmitted this message to the Vienna Public Prosecutor's Office:

"In 1928, Gabriel Munk, fur-dealer, together with the chemist Ludwig Auer, a well-known drug smuggler, since deceased, carried out a transaction in narcotic drugs involving the [indecipherable] of 110 or 120 kg. of heroin to the United States. Munk's share in this transaction amounted to 30 kg. and he gave Auer a bill for approximately $35,000. Auer obtained the good from an international drug smuggler, Josef Raskin of Paris, who had presumably procured them from the factory of Louis Rössler et Fils of Nieder Morschwiller, near Mulhausen in Alsace, a firm in which he was a partner. The transport of the goods was entrusted to the Peruvian Consul in Vienna, Carlos Fernandes Bacula, who sent the heroin to New York as diplomatic luggage by the SS Île de France against payment of £75. The uniform statements of all the parties are in agreement that not only Auer and Munk, but also the well-known drug smuggler, Hermann Blauaug, was interested in these goods, which [indecipherable] value (the legitimate purchase price of heroin being at that time about $1200 per kg). Blauaug sent Wilhelm Kofler, of Rotesterngasse 23, Vienna II, as his agent to the United States. Kofler there met Munk, who was also awaiting. Bacula's arrival with the goods. Both were staying at the Pennsylvania Hotel, New York. Bacula actually arrived with the goods in New York and transmitted a trunk alleged to contain 50 kg. of the goods to Kofler; the latter delivered them to the well-known American drug smuggler, Sam Bernstein, who stated on the next day that a police commission had taken the goods from him. Munk, who had not received any of the goods, ultimately learned he was not intended to receive them, either, and, according to his statement, received a considerable sum of money from Bernstein and went back to Vienna. On August 16th, 1928, Wilhelm Kofler, who, after quarreling with Munk, had separated from him, was found in the Central Hotel, 673 Broadway, New York, dead with his throat cut; the American police presumed that he committed suicide. Shortly before his death the last stocks of drugs had been taken away from Kofler by a false police commission. It is impossible to ascertain whether Kofler's suicide is connected with this loss. This fact would not explain the suicide, as he was not financially interested in the consignment; in fact, since that time, there have been repeated rumors that Kofler did not commit suicide but was murdered by one of his accomplices."

With the exception of Bácula, every smuggler that Tschepper named in his account of criminal activity here was Jewish.

== Dismissal from the diplomatic service (1930–1931) ==
Unfortunately for Bácula, those same conditions that made Vienna the narcotics trade capital of Europe in the 1920's, also led to the rise of Johannes Schober, the founder of Interpol, and a chief of police exceptionally bent on tearing down his city's narcotics networks. At the same time that Bácula was a part of an increasingly interconnected narcotics network, Schober and his colleagues at the League of Nations were creating a worldwide network of intelligence sharing. By 1930, the Viennese police were cracking down hard on the narcotics trade.

Also in the year 1930, narcotics enforcement in the United States was transferred from the Bureau of Prohibition Narcotics Division to the newly created Federal Bureau of Narcotics. The former Commissioner of Narcotics, Levi G. Nutt, was replaced by the relatively young and seemingly untouchable Harry Anslinger.

In 1930, following the closure of the pharmaceutical factory in Mulhouse by French authorities, Joseph Raskin resurfaced again in Vienna. When Austrian police under Johannes Schober detained him, Raskin secured his release by providing detailed information about Bácula’s involvement in the narcotics trade, particularly highlighting a 1928 trip to New York. In response, the Peruvian government reassigned Bácula to its embassy in Norway and initiated an internal inquiry. In May 1931, a senior Austrian police official named Bruno Shultz circulated a report based on Raskin’s testimony to major international law enforcement agencies and the League of Nations. Shortly thereafter, Bácula was dismissed from Peru’s diplomatic service.

American authorities began heavily monitoring Bácula following the Schultz memo.

Landing in Manhattan in November 1931, he was travelling on a personal passport now that his diplomatic passport had been revoked. However, his luggage was still stamped under diplomatic privilege thanks to a spare set of stamps he had made. Noticing incongruities, and having received intelligence from the newly created FBN, Bácula was detained and held for questioning by a lawyer from the United States Attorney's office. The interrogation occurred on November 7.

When questioned about his immediate intentions, Bácula replied that he planned to travel to Paris before reestablishing his political connections with the goal of returning to Peru. During the ensuing legal proceedings, the U.S. Attorney grew increasingly frustrated with Bácula’s repeated deflections regarding opium trafficking. “I am not interested in the details of your political activities,” the attorney stated. “That is none of my business.”

Andreas Guidi writes:

"This interaction between two men who were clearly trying to pull the conversation toward different topics might seem trivial or confusing. Yet, their exchange reveals an interesting discrepancy between two ways of representing transnational connections: United States authorities saw Bacula as a hyperconnected trafficker within a global criminal syndicate that targeted their country, while he depicted himself as a politician campaigning internationally to bring change to only one country, his homeland Peru."

Bácula was involved heavily around this time in political activities relating to Peru. He was either professionally involved or very good friends with Víctor Raúl Haya de la Torre, leader of the Alianza Popular Revolucionaria Americana (APRA). APRA's leadership was influenced heavily by their experiences in Europe during the interwar years, and embraced a platform centered on Latin American unity, anti-imperialism, and democratic socialism. Having lived in many European societies that held such practices, Bácula desired to see them implemented in his birth country.

== Downfall (1931-1938) ==
Bácula settled in Paris, where he reconnected with Louis Lyon, a figure known to the Parisian social elite class as a gourmet restauranteur. Privately, however, Lyon was facilitating many of the city’s major narcotics transactions, especially on behalf of Elias Eliopoulos and the Drug Barons of Europe. Bácula adopted a more discreet approach, enlisting a network of Latin American diplomats to transport drugs on his behalf. He made frequent trips to southeastern Europe to secure supplies of raw opium intended for a covert processing facility he and Lyon had established in a quiet suburb of Paris, located at 220 Rue du Faubourg Saint-Honoré. The operation was overseen by the Anavi brothers.

=== Budapest hotel raid (1933) ===
On May 14, 1933, authorities in Budapest's northern suburbs conducted a raid on a hotel room. Earlier that week, the Paris police had alerted both Vienna and Budapest police forces about Raskin and Bacula, whom they had been monitoring for suspected narcotics trafficking. According to a radiogram transmitted from the Fünen police to Budapest, both men had recently been arrested in Vienna by the Paris police and subsequently released. The men had claimed false identities, Raskin identifying himself as a Hamburg-based factory director and unlicensed medical practitioner, and Bacula still called himself a Peruvian consul, despite his revoked status.

Investigators soon discovered that both men were operating out of 21 Hold Street in Budapest (District V), allegedly as part of a broader drug distribution network. When authorities attempted to detain them, the suspects apparently received advance warning and fled their hotel. However, in their haste, Raskin and Bacula left behind their luggage. Upon inspection, detectives found a significant quantity of cocaine and other narcotics, some disguised in soap packaging, as well as alcohol and a number of suspicious letters. One letter, reportedly addressed from Raskin, indicated ongoing contact and coordination with local actors in Budapest. Additional documents suggested that narcotics had either been sent to or were intended for delivery in Hungary. The involvement of Hungarian manufacturer Stühmer Frigyes Rt. was noted in passing.

=== Paris factory explosion (1935) ===
On 30 March 1935, Viennese police registered the arrival of Carlos Fernandez Bacula at his residence on Rennweg 3, a property formerly occupied by the Uruguayan legation. Karl Hudeczk wrote in official document of the League of Nations that shortly thereafter, the authorities learned he had received two crates from Paris, believed to contain narcotics. A search of the house on April 12 found no drugs, but according to the report, Bacula acknowledged past and recent contacts with traffickers, including Judel Josef Raskin and Hermann Blauaug, and earlier associations in New York with Alexander Singer and Wilhelm Kofler, the latter having died there under unresolved circumstances. He admitted maintaining communication with Blauaug, though he claimed it was related to the attempted sale of his residence.

His wife, Anita, reported being born in Krüth, Alsace, near the offices of Louis Rösler & Son, the firm linked to Raskin and the 1927 smuggling of narcotics into New York. While the Vienna investigation did not establish Bacula’s direct involvement in recent trafficking, it confirmed his continued connections to figures central to the international drug trade. On this basis, the authorities ordered his expulsion and notified French officials to obtain further information on his activities.

In May 1935, an explosion occurred at 220 Rue du Faubourg Saint-Honoré in Paris, revealing a concealed laboratory used for narcotics production. The incident led to the arrest of Georges Chabat and Benjamin Anavi. Isaac Anavi, Benjamin’s brother, was also implicated but avoided capture during searches connected to the case. Joseph Avenol writes that during the subsequent investigation, the Central Office provided information suggesting that Louis Lyon had a role in the laboratory’s operation. At the time, the evidence was deemed insufficient, and charges against Lyon were dropped. A renewed inquiry initiated by the Parquet de la Seine in early 1936, however, resulted in the opening of formal judicial proceedings.

In December 1937, Austrian officials intercepted a shipment of opium concealed in a train car en route to Paris. Documentation associated with the cargo implicated Bácula in the trafficking operation. Anticipating arrest, he escaped again to Switzerland before prosecutors could finalize a case against him.

By the late 1930s, agents under Harry Anslinger suspected that Bácula, along with his associate Louis Lyon, had played a central role in establishing a major heroin supply route into the United States. However, Lyon and his associates benefited from high-level protection within the French government, which complicated efforts to build a legal case. Years of investigation eventually yielded substantive evidence linking the two men to the French heroin factory explosion. Under pressure from U.S. officials, French authorities filed charges against Bácula and Lyon in 1938. At the same time, American agents provided the Vienna police with intelligence implicating Bácula in a drug shipment seized in Austria the previous year.

Following Austria’s annexation by Nazi Germany in March 1938, the Reich government formally requested Bácula’s extradition in June to stand trial in Vienna. The French government submitted its own extradition request in August. At this stage, Bácula sought refuge in Switzerland, residing for a time at a hotel in Lugano. While there, American authorities intercepted a significant volume of correspondence between him and a prominent British mistress.

=== Burghölzli psychiatric clinic (1938) ===
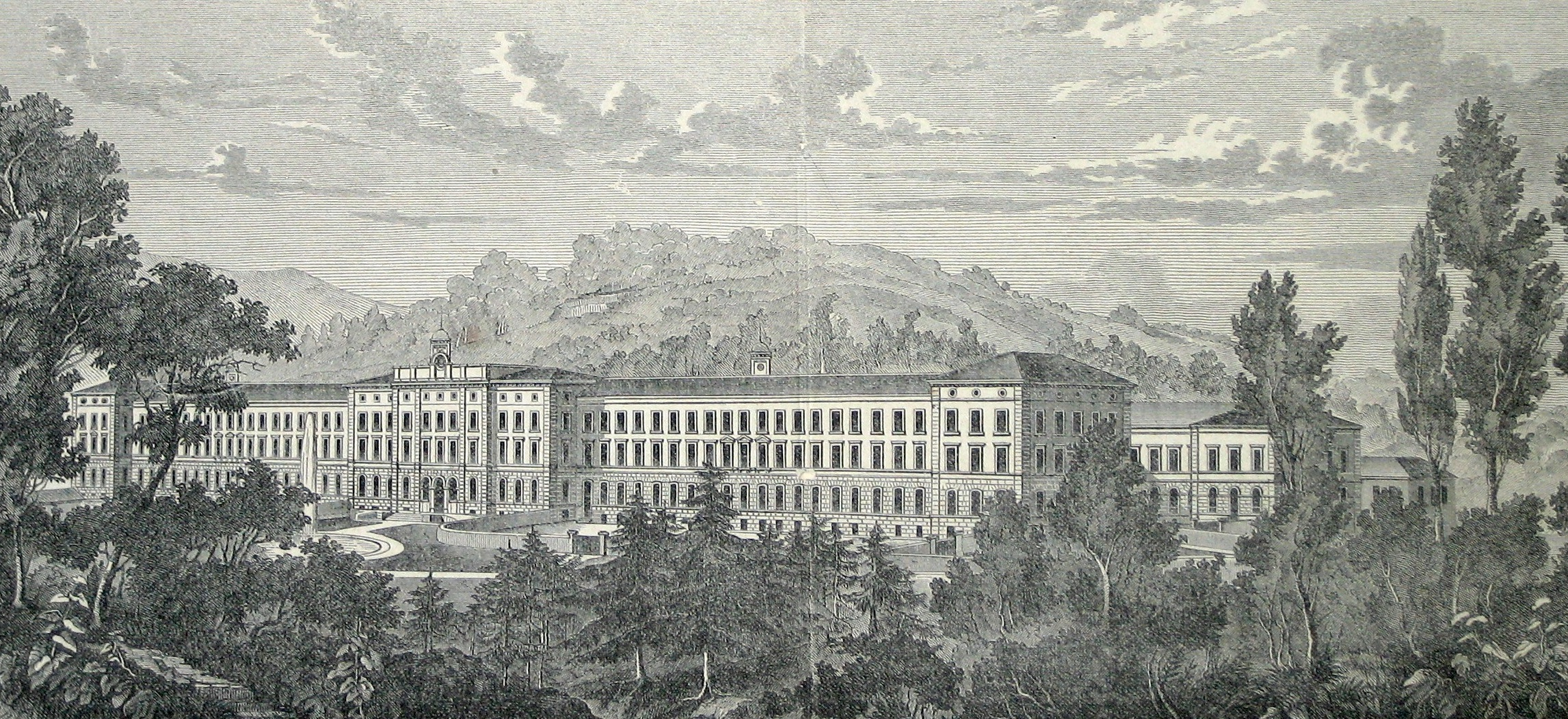
Drawing of the Burghölzli Psychiatric Clinic from 1880. Bácula voluntarily admitted himself here during 1938.

Aware that his mail was being monitored, and reportedly suffering from paranoia and emotional distress, Bácula admitted himself to the Burghölzli psychiatric clinic near Zurich in May 1938, acting on the advice of his legal counsel. He was reportedly fearful of arrest and experienced persistent suicidal thoughts. Physicians at the clinic were supervising him when both French and German extradition requests arrived in Bern.

According to official document signed by Camille Gorgé, recorded in the records of the Federal Political Department of the League of Nations, at the time of his arrest, Bacula was residing voluntarily at Burghölzli, where he was permitted to remain under supervision by the arresting authorities. Swiss federal authorities then reviewed the extradition requests by the French and Germans. In each instance, however, they declared that the evidence directly linking him to the offenses was limited. French request and declined it. Under the Franco-Swiss extradition treaty, the alleged offense was not covered, and the penalties specified in Switzerland’s 1924 Narcotics Law were considered too lenient to allow extradition under the treaty’s provisions. The French Embassy was informed that reciprocity could be considered if Swiss legislation were revised to increase the maximum penalties.

The German request went under review by the Federal Tribunal. In September, Bacula was released from Burghölzli with official authorization and rejoined his wife in Lugano, where he remained under obligation to make himself available to the authorities until the extradition proceedings were resolved. Throughout, Bacula consistently denied involvement in the criminal cases under investigation in Vienna and Paris.

Also in 1938, Louis Lyon was arrested in Paris. Another man, a smuggler in New York named Jonathan Gottlieb, was arrested by the United States Customs Service. Afterwards, he reportedly committed suicide in his cell at Albany County Jail. His confession, according to the United States Department of the Treasury (the parent department of the FBN), "was of importance in crushing this drug conspiracy."

=== Legal defense ===
In contesting his extradition, Bácula centered his defense on both assertions of personal innocence and a broader critique of transnational policing practices originating in Vienna and the United States. He argued that the international campaign against him stemmed primarily from the memorandum written by Bruno Schultz in May 1931: information, he claimed, that was based on unfounded allegations made by a known trafficker seeking to shift blame. According to Bácula, this memo led law enforcement agencies to label him a trafficker, initiating what he described as a cyclical exchange of misinformation. Accusations originating in Vienna were relayed to Paris and then returned to Vienna as seemingly corroborated evidence.

Bácula’s defense emphasized what he saw as a fundamental flaw in the operations of the International Criminal Police Commission, which, he argued, lacked mechanisms to correct erroneous accusations. In his view, the system disproportionately affected foreigners, who were often deprived of legal recourse, particularly as the Vienna police had developed this international model partly to circumvent domestic limitations on drug enforcement by targeting and monitoring non-citizens abroad.

With regard to the United States, Bácula presented himself as a prominent opponent of U.S. influence in Latin America, citing his affiliation with Peru’s APRA Party, known for its anti-imperialist platform. He alleged that American narcotics officials had fabricated evidence of drug trafficking in order to undermine him politically and suppress dissenting voices in the region. Although his personal claims lacked factual basis, his broader insight into the political dimensions of drug enforcement proved to be accurate. U.S. agents did later circulate false claims that APRA leader Víctor Raúl Haya de la Torre was connected to cocaine trafficking, illustrating how anti-narcotics efforts could be used to pursue geopolitical objectives.

His legal defense ultimately proved unsuccessful.

== World War II and recruitment into Abwehr ==
The Swiss authorities denied France’s request for Bácula’s extradition but approved the German petition. In June 1940, he was handed over to German officials. By that time, the International Criminal Police Commission had come under increasing influence from the Third Reich, as individuals aligned with the Nazi regime gradually assumed control following the annexation of Austria. In 1941, the commission’s headquarters were officially relocated to Berlin. That same year, a court in Vienna sentenced Bácula to 18 months in prison, taking into account the time he had already spent in pretrial detention.

In 1942, Bácula was transferred to a concentration camp in German-occupied France, the Tourelles Barracks in Paris, to serve his sentence in connection with the heroin laboratory uncovered near Paris. Soon after his arrival, he was approached by German military intelligence and recruited for an operation intended to smuggle heroin to Allied personnel in North Africa. While Bácula was sitting in the concentration camp, one of his many former clients, Paul Carbone, had approached a German officer known only as "von Eschwege," with a scheme to use narcotics as a tool of sabotage targeting Allied forces. Von Eschwege believed that heroin could be directed specifically toward military personnel to weaken their effectiveness.

The proposed route involved smuggling heroin through Spain, then across the Strait of Gibraltar into North Africa. Carbone’s Corsican network, which maintained influence over local establishments including brothels, would facilitate the storage and distribution of the drug. One key figure in the operation was Antoine Peretti, Carbone’s distant cousin and a former manager of the Chantilly nightclub, once frequented by the Paris elite. Although Carbone framed the operation as ideologically motivated, intended to hinder Allied progress, he also stood to benefit financially. Before moving forward, however, he requested the release of his associate, Carlos Fernández Bácula.

An operative for the Office of Strategic Services (OSS), Herbert Berthold-Bernard, known by the codename "JIGGER," submitted the following report:

In June 1943, Paul CARBONE, thru Simon SAPIANI (SHAEF card #240), suggested to Lt. Col. von ESCHWEGE, then Laiter II in Paris, that subject be released from the French concentration camp at Tourelles. BACULA had been sent there as an "undesirable" because he had been involved in the drug traffic and had been punished in Germany, then extradited to France. CARBONE thought that BACULA might be of interest to Abwehr II. As a matter of fact, CARBONE had talked to von ESCHWEGE earlier about a plan which called for getting heroin into North Africa. Von ESCHWEGE accepted this plan, by which the Germans were to get the drug into the hands of Corsicans who would get it into North Africa thru Spain. Once there it would find its way into the "maisons do tolerance" operated by Corsicans (Peretti at Algerete - SRAEF card No. 754.) Possibly identical with Antoine PERETTI (SHAEF card No. 716). In this way von ESCHWEGE thought he could direct it toward the military element.

After a long silence on the part of Berlin, to whom all such projects had to be submitted, the plan was turned down by them and the use of stupefying drugs in intelligence and counter-intelligence was strictly forbidden. Von ESCHWEGE was very much annoyed by this decision, because he felt that in matters like this, the possessor of drugs was the master of the situation.

In the meantime, at any rate, BACULA was freed from prison and CARBONE put him up at the home of Etienne LEANDRI (SHAEF card #203). Abwehr II was content for the time being merely to obtain from him particulars concerning his career.

...CARBONE intervened on BACULA's behalf three times, but this was merely in order to get him freed, because later CARBONE declared that he could not use him in his drug traffic because he was too well-known. CARBONE also told Von ESCHWEGE on many occasions that he was afraid that BACULA had become communist.

The operation to use heroin as a weapon against Allied forces was never implemented. Carbone himself was killed a few months later, on December 16, 1943, when the train he was traveling on derailed — an act of sabotage carried out by the French Resistance. This sabotage operation was planned and carried out by Louis Lyon, who by that time had been released from prison by the French and was operating as a deep cover operative for the Resistance (actions that would later earn Lyon the Croix de Guerre).

Although the North African heroin infiltration plan was ultimately abandoned, Bácula managed to obtain forged identification documents during this period. He spent the remainder of the Second World War living in concealment in Paris.

== Later life ==
Following the end of World War II, Bácula again became the subject of international scrutiny. Agents from the FBN continued their efforts to monitor his movements (several FBN agents were in fact working for the OSS during the war), tracing him from Paris to Peru, and later to Chile. However, they found no conclusive evidence linking him to renewed narcotics activity. Meanwhile, the newly created Interpol issued a notice requesting that member states maintain surveillance of Bácula.

In 1957, nearing his seventieth birthday, Bácula formally petitioned Interpol to end its monitoring of him. The request was granted, and he lived the remainder of his days in Chile.
