= Overworld (disambiguation) =

An overworld is the area within a video game that interconnects all its locations.

Overworld may also refer to:

- Overworld (band), a Swedish alt-metal group
- Overworld (Savant album), a 2012 electronic music album by Aleksander Vinter under the alias "Savant"
- Overworld (Machinae Supremacy album), a 2008 album by metal band Machinae Supremacy
- Overworld (Minecraft), the starting dimension in the 2009 video game Minecraft
- Heaven, the firmament, or the celestial spheres

== See also ==
- Underworld (disambiguation)
- Surface of the Earth
- Upper World (disambiguation)
