= Al Scharff =

American inspector for the Customs Service (1891–1968)

Alvin Friedman Scharff
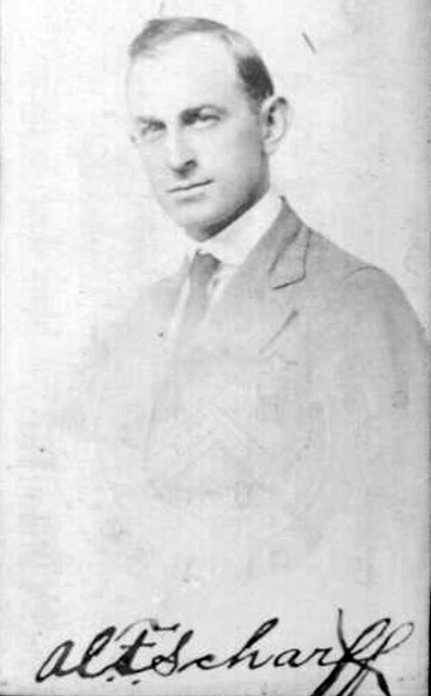
- 1922 Service Credential photograph

Executive Director, Houston Crime Commission
- In office 1961–1968
- Preceded by: Dan E. Goodykoontz

Supervising Special Agent in Charge of East Texas
- In office 1943–1961
- Commissioners: William Roy Johnson; Frank Dow; Ralph Kelly
- Duty Stations: Port of Houston, Port of Galveston, Port of Beaumont, Port of Port Arthur

Special Agent in Charge
- In office 1938–1943
- Commissioners: James Moyle; Basil Harris; William Roy Johnson
- Duty Station: Port of Houston

Chief United States Narcotics Investigator for Europe
- In office 1937–1938
- Secretary: Henry Morgenthau Jr.

Commanding Officer of the United States Customs Air Brigade
- In office 1931 – March 9, 1934

Personal details
- Born: May 20, 1891 Camden, Ouachita County, Arkansas, USA
- Died: March 24, 1968 (Aged 76) Houston, Harris County, Texas, USA
- Resting place: Beth Israel Cemetery
- Education: Memphis High School
- Nickname: Señor Sharpis

Military service
- Branch/service: Mexican Army; Federal Bureau of Investigation; United States Customs Service
- Battles/wars: Mexican Revolution; World War I; Mexico during World War I; World War II

Alvin "Al" Friedman Scharff (May 20, 1891 – March 24, 1968), was an American counterfeiter, cattle rustler, and smuggler, who later became a lifelong inspector for the United States Customs Service.

== Biography ==
In 1910, a year into his studies at university in Tennessee, he was diagnosed with tuberculosis and told he had six months to live. For his health, and to reduce his bouts of coughing up blood, he spent most of his life in the drier climates between the Southwestern United States and Mexico. In 1912, while working on a construction site near Tampico, Scharff was recruited into the Mexican Army, where he fought with a militia group under the distant command of Victoriano Huerta in several minor battles of the Mexican Revolution against the militias of Pascual Orozco, before deserting his post and escaping back to the United States, where he worked as a traveling salesman for several years.

In 1915, he became involved in a counterfeiting operation, dealing in fake Mexican pesos in the areas of Sonora and Nogales/Nogales. In 1918, he took part in a massive spy hunt for German spies in Mexico, assassinating two of them supposedly on the orders of the United States Government. In 1919, he joined Customs and advanced through the ranks from inspector, mounted inspector, special agent, special agent in charge (SAC), to eventually become supervising special agent in charge (SSAC).

Sometime in the 1920s, Scharff was assigned responsibilities to investigate violations of the Harrison Narcotics Tax Act, and began investigating a smuggling operation in Mexico that he believed was importing massive amounts of heroin from somewhere in Europe. While on deployments into Mexico, he coordinated heavily with members of the Mexican federal Narcotics Police. As this was also the Prohibition era, Scharff also chased down rum-runners, even going into Canada to track down two notorious rum-runners named Big Jim Clark and George Musey.

In 1931, Scharff set up the first-ever Air brigade along the Mexico–US border, notably in command of this brigade during a 200-mile chase to pursue the flying ace and rum-runner Thomas Ponder. In 1936, Scharff ran afoul of Josephus Daniels, who did not understand why Scharff was running an investigation in Mexico City.

In 1937, while following the threads of the massive narcotics network, the Secretary of the Treasury, Henry Morgenthau Jr., assigned Scharff the responsibility as chief narcotics investigator for all of Europe. While in Europe, he infiltrated a branch of the Sûreté Nationale that had been providing protection for a drug kingpin named Louis Lyon, eventually gathering enough evidence to have Lyon publicly convicted, at the same time endeavoring not to compromise Lyon's secret missions against Nazis in the French criminal underworld.

Scharff was constantly at-odds with Harry Anslinger and the Federal Bureau of Narcotics (FBN), and believed that narcotics investigation efforts should remain in the control of Customs, and not the nascent agency. Especially throughout his career, Scharff went into shouting matches with Anslinger's top enforcement agent, George Hunter White, who would eventually launch an investigation of his own into Scharff in 1954. Scharff was forced to retire from Customs in 1961 at the mandatory government retirement age of 70, but soon became the executive director of the Houston Crime Commission.
