= Underworld (disambiguation) =

The underworld is a place in religion and mythology to where the souls of the recently departed go.

Underworld may also refer to:

- Greek underworld, the Greek version
- Criminal underworld, another name for organized crime
- Hell in Christianity, sometimes used more favorably than "hell"

== Comics ==
- Underworld (comic strip), an adult comic strip by Kaz
- Underworld (Mad Cave Studios comics), a 2024 comic by Mad Cave Studios

== Computer games ==
- Tomb Raider: Underworld, released in 2008, the eighth game in the Tomb Raider series
- Ultima Underworld, series of computer games first released in 1992
- Underworld: The Eternal War, a 2004 PlayStation 2 game based on the 2003 film
- Underwurlde, 1984 computer game featuring Sabreman

== Film and television ==
- Underworld (1927 film), a silent film directed by Josef von Sternberg
- Underworld (1937 film), an Oscar Micheaux film
- Underworld (1985 film), a horror film written by Clive Barker
- Underworld (1996 film), a comedy/thriller film starring Denis Leary and Joe Mantegna
- Underworld (film series), a horror/action film series with five installments
  - Underworld (2003 film), the first movie, released in 2003
  - Underworld: Evolution, the 2006 sequel
  - Underworld: Rise of the Lycans, the 2009 prequel
  - Underworld: Awakening, 2012, fourth movie in the series
  - Underworld: Blood Wars, 2016, fifth movie in the series
- Underworld (2004 film), a 2004 Sri Lankan film
- Underworld (Doctor Who), a serial in the British science fiction television series Doctor Who
- Underworld Trilogy, 2010 drama/thriller television series
- Cities of the Underworld, a documentary television series

== Literature ==
- Underworld (novel), a 1997 novel written by Don DeLillo
- Underworld: The Mysterious Origins of Civilization, a non-fiction work of historical speculation written by Graham Hancock
- Resident Evil: Underworld, the fourth entry in S.D. Perry's series of novels based on Capcom's franchise of videogames, Resident Evil
- Underworld (Reginald Hill novel), a 1988 novel from the Dalziel and Pascoe series
- Underworld (Doctor Who novel), novelization of the television episode
- Underworld (film series novels), novelizations of the Underworld film series and an original novel based on the setting

== Music ==
- Underworld (band), a British electronic music band
- Underworld (Adagio album), a 2003 album
- Underworld (Divinyls album), a 1996 album
- Underworld (Symphony X album), a 2015 album
- Underworld (Vamps album), a 2017 album
- Underworld (Tonight Alive album), a 2018 album
- Camden Underworld, a music venue and nightclub located under The World's End pub in Camden Town, London
- Underworld Inc., a sub-label of Battle Axe Records

== Other ==
- Operation Underworld, United States government's code name for its co-operation with the Italian-American Mafia and Jewish organized crime figures from 1942 to 1945

== See also ==
- Netherworld (disambiguation)
- Hollow Earth (disambiguation)
- The Underworld (disambiguation)
