= August Del Gracio =

Italian American gangster

- August Del Gaizo
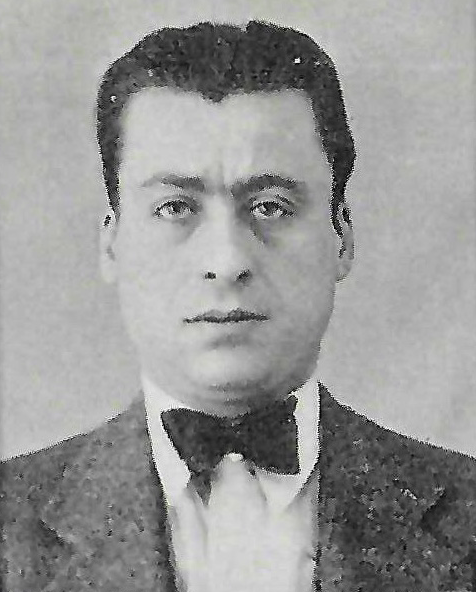
- Mugshot taken by the German police in 1931 after an arrest for narcotics
- Born: July 10, 1893; New York City, US
- Other names: Little Augie; Augie the Wop; Little Augie the Wop; Little Augy; Del Grassio; Augie del Gracio; Max Cohen; Sam Gold; August Moore; Augie Dallas; Sam the S.; Augie del Graci; A. Dalies
- Spouse: Anna Walker

August "Augie" Del Gracio (July 10, 1893 – ?) was an Italian American gangster and mob enforcer in the 1920s, 1930s and 1940s in New York and Europe. He held a high position in the mafias, serving first as a lieutenant for Arnold Rothstein and Elie Eliopoulos, and later for Frank Costello and Lucky Luciano, earning the ire of the Federal Bureau of Narcotics (FBN) in the process. He was also a key figure in the Tammany Hall corner squads, running the corner of Baxter and Hester for the mayoral campaign of 1933. The Commissioner of the FBN, Harry Anslinger, wrote that Del Gracio was a "much-travelled punk" and a "patent-leather hood," placing him at #89 in his bureau's internationally distributed FBN BLACK BOOK, featuring their most wanted notorious international narcotics smugglers. Anslinger also wrote that Del Gracio was "an East Side mobster of whom it was said he would sell his own sister if the price was realistic."

While he might have only made 89th on the FBN's list, the Central Narcotics Bureau of the Egyptian Government and its leader, Russell Pasha, made him their 12th most wanted person in the world in the 1930s. He was in and out of prison over the decades – over a dozen times between 1918 and 1930 – but never stayed in prison long, if at all. He later bragged about his ability to kill informants while awaiting trial. Del Gracio was eventually captured in 1931 by German police officers after a strange and convoluted drug deal gone awry, in which the German police connected him to a wider narcotics network that stretched the length of the globe, as far away from New York City as Afghanistan, Turkey, Iran and China. However, his final arraignment was not until 1937, being sentenced to two months in what one newspaper described as a "Nazi jail."

During World War II, he was one of the key figures in initiating Operation Underworld, which was a US government program wherein members of the Office of Strategic Services (OSS) and the Office of Naval Intelligence (ONI) worked with members of the Sicilian Mafia to protect the movements of American troops as they advanced through Italy during World War II and to protect key naval shipyards in the US from strikes and sabotage. Del Gracio's efforts helped Lucky Luciano secure a full pardon from New York State Governor Thomas E. Dewey in exchange for the Mafia help with the war effort.

During the war, Del Gracio was also one of the first unwitting experimental subjects of the US government's search for a mind control drug, also known as the truth drug experiments. While several employees of the Manhattan Project had already been tested with drugs, Del Gracio was considered by Stanley Platt Lovell to be the first field test. He was dosed without his knowledge with THC-A by FBN District Supervisor George Hunter White, who at the time was working for the OSS. White previously knew Del Gracio from his job as a narcotics agent for the Federal Bureau of Narcotics (FBN). Del Gracio reached out to White to see if the government would negotiate with the mafia to help the war effort in exchange for the release of Lucky Luciano.

On May 27, 1943 White invited Del Gracio up to his apartment to discuss the mafia's cooperation in protecting the New York waterfront from Axis influence and to seek the mafia's help in the up-coming Allied invasion of Italy. The OSS through White gave Del Gracio marijuana-laced cigarettes, which the agency believed brought on a state of irresponsibility and talkativeness. The test was considered a success as Del Gracio shared many illicit details about running a drug business. These experiments were the blueprint for the later MKUltra program.
