= The Underworld =

The Underworld may refer to:

- Criminal underworld
- The Underworld (album), 1991 album by Evildead
- Camden Underworld, a music venue in Camden Town, London, England
- Underworld (band)
- The Underworld (film), 2018 Assamese language film

== See also ==
- Underworld (disambiguation)
