= Hollow Earth (disambiguation) =

The Hollow Earth is a concept proposing that the planet Earth is entirely hollow or contains a substantial interior space.

Hollow Earth may also refer to:

- The Hollow Earth, a 1990 novel by Rudy Rucker
  - Return to the Hollow Earth, a 2018 novel by Rudy Rucker
- Hollow Earth (album), a 1994 album by Soma
- Hollow Earth Expedition, a 2006 role-playing game
- "The Hollow Earth", a song by Thom Yorke
- Hollow Earth (novel), a 2012 novel by John Barrowman and Carole Barrowman
- "Buried Forest, Decidously Insulated" In BFB(pre split) number 14
