= Maurice Privat =

French author

- Born: 13 May 1889; Paris, France
- Died: 1949 (aged 59–60)
- Occupation: Author

Maurice Privat (1889–1949) was a French author. He was an advisor to Pierre Laval, who served as the French Prime Minister from 1942 to 1944.

== Works ==
- Privat, Maurice (1918). Si j'étais ministre du commerce... Paris: La renaissance du livre. OCLC 807718162.
- Privat, Maurice (1929). La vie et la mort d'Alfred Loewenstein : l'homme aux 2 milliards. Paris: La Nouvelle Société d'éditions. OCLC 492464692.
- Privat, Maurice (1930). Haute finance et basse justice. Paris: Alexis Redier. OCLC 493321711.
- Privat, Maurice (1931). L'énigme Philippe Daudet. Paris: Les Documents secrets. OCLC 369134595.
- Privat, Maurice (1931). Les révolutions de 1914 et la crise mondiale. Paris: Documents secrets. OCLC 901212548.
- Privat, Maurice (1932). Bandits corses. Paris: Documents secrets. OCLC 151098499.
- Privat, Maurice (1948). Pierre Laval, cet inconnu. Paris: Editions Fournier-Valdès. OCLC 406950051.
