= Thomas Wentworth Russell =

British police officer (1879-1954)

Sir Thomas Wentworth Russell "Russell Pasha" Pasha
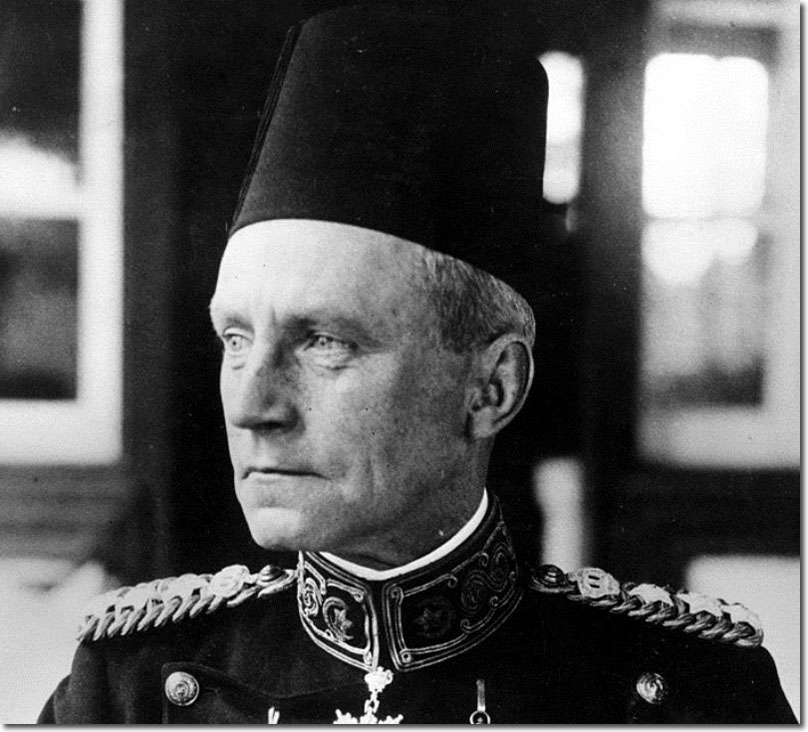

Commandant and Pasha
- In office 1917–1929
- Monarch: Fuad I
- Prime Minister: Abdel Khaliq Sarwat Pasha
- Department: Cairo city police
- British high commissioner: Edmund Allenby, 1st Viscount Allenby

Director of the Egyptian Central Narcotics Intelligence Bureau
- In office 1929–1946
- Monarchs: Fuad I; Farouk I
- Prime Minister: Abdel Khaliq Sarwat Pasha
- British high commissioner: George Lloyd, 1st Baron Lloyd; Percy Loraine
- Counterparts: Harry J. Anslinger, Charles Henry Ludovic Sharman

Personal details
- Born: 22 November 1879 Wollaton rectory, England
- Died: 10 April 1954 (aged 74) London
- Spouse: Evelyn Dorothea Temple (m. 1911–1954)
- Relatives: Sir John Wriothesley Russell (son); Christopher Sykes (son-in-law); John Russell (grandfather); Henry Willoughby (great-grandfather)
- Education: Cheam School; Haileybury College
- Alma mater: Trinity College, Cambridge
- Years active: c. 1902 - 1946
- Other names: Russell Pasha

Sir Thomas Wentworth Russell (22 November 1879 – 10 April 1954), better known as Russell Pasha, was a British police officer in the Egyptian service. He was the fourth child and third son of the Rev. Henry Charles Russell, the grandson of the sixth Duke of Bedford, and his wife, Leila Louisa Millicent Willoughby, the daughter of the eighth Baron Middleton.

As the director of the Central Narcotics Intelligence Bureau (CNIB), Russell Pasha became an anti-drug campaigner when he realised that opium, heroin, cocaine and hashish were being smuggled into Egypt in great and increasing quantities.

Al Jazeera writes:

"Thomas Russell Pasha, who reached the highest administrative and functional ranks during his long service in the Egyptian Ministry for a period of 44 years, was a shrewd British man in Egypt, and one of the most important figures who laid the foundations for the emergence and development of the security apparatus in Egypt before the 1952 revolution."

== Studies ==
He was educated at Cheam School, Haileybury College, and Trinity College, Cambridge, between the years 1899 and 1902. In 1902, he was awarded a BA. His choice of career was settled when he was invited to visit Cairo by a distant cousin, then adviser to the Egyptian minister of the interior. He went back home to graduate, entering the Egyptian service in October 1902. An apprenticeship of ten years gave him a good understanding of the Egyptian society as well as the conditions and customs that drove the lives of the Egyptian fellahin.

== Early days ==
After an apprenticeship with the Alexandria coastguards, he was appointed provincial sub-inspector in the Ministry of Interior, in January 1902. He served later as inspector, in every Egyptian province, acquiring great knowledge of local officials, while directing police activities of all kind. In 1911 he was appointed assistant commandant of police in Alexandria. He was transferred to Cairo as assistant commandant in 1913.

In 1911 he married Evelyn Dorothea Temple (d.1968), with whom he had one son, Sir John Wriothesley Russell (who was to become British ambassador to Spain in 1969), and one daughter, Camilla Georgiana, who married the writer Christopher Sykes.

== Becoming commandant ==
In 1917 he was appointed commandant of the Cairo city police with rank of major-general and title of Pasha. After 1922 he served under twenty-nine different Egyptian ministers of interior. However, his talents were gradually focused on fighting the spread of drugs and drug addiction in Egypt. In 1929 the Egyptian Central Narcotics Intelligence Bureau (CNIB) was formed, with him as the director. He remained in this position until 1946. There he gained an even more profound understanding of Egyptian society than routine police work could ever have provided. Regarding the formation of the Egyptian Central Narcotics Intelligence Bureau, Russell Pasha writes in his memoirs:

At the beginning of 1929 Muhammad Mahmud Pasha, then Prime Minister, had become as alarmed as myself at the devastating effect that heroin addiction was having, not only in the cities, but also in every village in the country. The peaceful, happy villages of my inspector days were being rotted with dope and nothing serious was being done to prevent it. Had the damage been confined to the upper and educated classes of the cities I don't think that I should have been so stirred, but when I had collected what reliable figures I could obtain and calculated that out of a total population of fourteen million possibly half a million were now slaves to the drug habit, and they the backbone of the land, I realized that here was a job worth doing and one that, with the Prime Minister's support I felt capable of tackling

While his main focus was on drug related crimes, in his 44 years of police work he also dealt with a large collection of other crimes. They included: many common murders (happening an average of eight times a day in Egypt, mostly committed by fellahin in compensation of their business or personal feuds), as well as the clarification of some big political assassinations in Cairo.

== War on drugs ==
In his memoirs, Russell Pasha describes hashish and opium as "black drugs", and cocaine, morphine and heroin as "white drugs". It's the latter, chemical ones that he determined as a "major danger to the country" and expresses his decision to "for a time ignore the black drug traffic, if doing so would get us on to the white".

Russell Pasha’s view on the drug and ideas of how to deal with the drug problem were undoubtedly inspired by Britain’s hashish policy in India. The cultivation of cannabis in India was monopolised and its cultivation and sale were taxed and licensed. The possibility of implementing this same policy in India was constantly considered by British officials in Egypt. Three prominent British diplomats in Egypt, in the years preceding the CNIB, had called for policies similar to the one in India to be implemented in Egypt. They were: Alfred Caillard Pasha, the British general director of customs in Egypt; and Evelyn Baring (Lord Cromer) and Lord Kitchener, both British Consuls General. They saw that, like in India, hashish was so widely consumed that it would be difficult to completely eradicate its consumption and instead it should be regulated. A law based on that of India's to regulate, register, and licence the manufacturing, selling, and import of hashish was drafted, but never put into effect.

=== Formation of the Central Narcotics Intelligence Bureau (CNIB) ===
Russell Pasha states in his memoirs that his request to form the CNIB was approved after he provided evidence to the Prime Minister that almost half a million Egyptians, out of a population of fourteen million, were drug addicts.

The terms of reference were wide. I was to be the Director, with the right of selecting my own specialized police staff, with direct access to all Egyptian Government Departments and foreign public security authorities, and to have at my disposal a budget of £E10.000 a year for which I need account to no one.

He also declares a feeling of fortune about the "exceptionally efficient team of officers and constables from the Egyptian Police" that he was able to select. The objects of the Bureau, described in his memoirs, were the following:

1. To trace to their source, in Europe or elsewhere, the imported drugs that were now ruining Egypt,
2. To present the facts to the League of Nations,
3. To pursue and prosecute drug traffickers in Egypt,
4. To put, by every possible means, such difficulties in the way of the traffic that retail prices in Egypt would rise to a height beyond the reach of the fellahin.

=== Hashish ===
During the brief French occupation of Egypt in 1798–1801, Napoleon banned hashish preparation and consumption because of the spread of its use among the French military, with little success, however. Mahammed Ali Pasha’s Egyptian government (starting in 1803) was focused on modernising the state, especially in the area of health. This idea of modernising medicine could have influenced the hostile attitudes towards hashish as it was an unregulated consumption of drugs. Hashish was banned in Egypt between 1868 and 1884. Muhammad Ali Bey, an important medical doctor (who was going to be later the head of the medical school and the editor of Egypt's first medical journal, Ya'sub al-Tibb), published a detailed report in 1868 that led to the ban on cultivation, use and importation of hashish. In 1874 hashish was imported under the payment of duty, but in November 1877 an imperial order from Istanbul stipulated that all hashish brought into Egypt was to be destroyed. In March 1879 the Egyptian government banned the cultivation, distribution and importation of the drug in Egypt.

This prohibition of hashish in Egypt can be seen as a response to an image that started to become popular among European travellers and local Egyptian westernised intellectuals: of the Egyptian lower classes as demented, lethargic, irrational and unproductive hashish smokers and of Egyptian streets carrying the sweet and debilitating smell of hashish smoke. Banning hashish was a step in the direction to becoming a civilised society and a way to discipline the lower classes into rationality. Historically, Egyptians had recourse to the drug as an alternative to wine. Wine, even though prohibited in Islam, was known as the substance for the rich as it was more expensive, while the less expensive hashish was known as a substance for the poor.

The trafficking of hashish into Egypt in the later part of the nineteenth century and early twentieth century came mostly from Greece. In response to British pressure, Greece increased their prohibition efforts and Syrian and Lebanese suppliers took over the trafficking of hashish, moving it to Egypt through Palestine.

==== Russell Pasha's view on Hashish ====
Russell Pasha considered hashish consumption as a relatively innocuous habit, in comparison to the "plague" of heroin and cocaine consumption, which became popular after the First World War. Baron Harry D'Erlanger, Russell's associate, similarly declared that hashish was no more than a 'pet failing of many members of the poorer classes'. According to D'Erlanger, Russell considered legalising the drug, turning it into a revenue-producing good, thus preserving national funds, which would be spent on home-grown products rather than importing from abroad. This consideration echoes those of Caillard, Cromer, and Kitchener, based on the Indian policy. Nahas writes that British officials, and particularly Russell, did not care enough about the drug because they saw hashish intoxication as "one expression of oriental languid and dreamy temperament". Even though several British officials supported the legalisation of the drug, they continued to enforce the ban and guarded Egyptian borders, ports and shores to get a hold on the small percentage of the hashish that eventually found its way to Egyptian consumers.

=== Heroin, "the drug that nearly killed Egypt" ===
Russell Pasha writes in his memoirs:

It was in 1916 that cocaine began to make its first appearance in Cairo, to be followed later by the pleasanter and more potent heroin, but there was little that we could do at that time when trafficking or possession was a mere contravention with a maximum penalty of £EI fine or a week's imprisonment.

Writing about those early days he states:

Prices in those days were comparatively low, a shot only cost a few shillings and the trade, wise in its generation, kept the price down until the vice had spread and caught large numbers of the population in its grip. We even had instances of contractors paying their labourers in heroin.

But then, the situation started to become alarming:

About 1928 I began to realize that something was happening which was producing a new slum population in Cairo, the like of which we had not seen before. For the first time we heard of the method of intravenous injection of heroin and soon came across its victims. Within a short time we found a new element in our Bulaq [Cairo] slums. In the past the population of this teeming quarter of Cairo had been largely composed of the rough Upper Egypt labourer type who had got left behind in Cairo after his annual migration from his southern village (where there was no work during the Nile flood) to Alexandria and the Delta for seasonal work. They were a rough class but healthy and strong. Now we began to find human wreckage lying about in the Bulaq lanes, pale-faced semi-corpses evidently not of the Bulaq type who when spoken to replied in educated Arabic or even English and admitted that it was the heroin habit that had got them there. The heroin on the market was still fairy pure and therefore strong, and the Bulaq settling-pit quickly filled with the human debris of every class of Egyptian society.

==== Curing addicts ====
As described by Russell Pasha in his memoirs, one of the traits of the drug addiction in Egypt was the pitiful desire of many addicts to be cured:

I had hopes in the early days of our campaign of persuading the Government to establish treatment centres outside Cairo on the lines of the Lexington Farm in America, but I was not successful and one can understand hesitation to attempt the reformation of, literally, thousands of sufferers from a disease which could only be cured by the ministrations of a specialist in each individual case. All one could do was to consider addiction and possession as a penal offence and condemn the victims to terms of imprisonment sufficiently long to break them completely of the habit before they returned again to their old life and temptation. We were often criticized by the medical authorities in England and Geneva for this apparently brutal treatment of what is really a mental and not a criminal condition, but I feel that, under the circumstances, this treatment was inevitable and even justified by the results it produced.

=== Progress made by the year 1931 ===
The international trafficking of hashish (Indian hemp) was made illegal to countries that had criminalised it at the League of Nations' 1925 Opium Convention, after a suggestion made by Egypt. The League of Nations made this 'humanitarian effort' thinking that with international collaboration they could help heal the world's physical and social ills. Russell Pasha's reports on drugs and hashish to the Home Office in London were passed around the League of Nations Advisory Committee in 1929. Realizing the importance of examining the facts in those reports, Russell Pasha appeared at the Committee in Geneva as the Egyptian representative.

In January 1931, in a Communication to the League of Nations Special Committee Meeting in Geneva, where Russell Pasha was representing "the Kingdom of Egypt", he writes:

In my last year's report I painted, in colours strong but true, the ghastly state of thousands of the inhabitants of Egypt as a result of the introduction into the country of the vice of the taking of narcotics. A year has passed since then. True, a very small time in history or in the life of a country, but a twelve-month of vital value when we are dealing with the narcotic poisoning of a nation. I am in the happy position of being able to report progress. It is easy to be carried away by optimism and to see things as one wants to see them, but still, under the coldest douche of strict reality, I am convinced that drug addiction among the fellahin of Egypt has fallen by 50 per cent. If my last year's figure of half a million addicts out of fourteen million inhabitants was true, it is still a sufficiently terrible fact that 250.000 people should be the slaves and victims of drug addiction.

According to his observations, the majority of the big traffickers in Egypt at that time were the "Greeks, Turks and Palestinian Jews". He states:

Luckily for us, many of these Greeks are local subjects as regards criminal jurisdiction, as also are the Turks and Palestinians, and as much are amenable to the Egyptian criminal courts.

It was lucky for Russell Pasha because if these traffickers were not local subjects, they would have been subject to capitulations, meaning that they were tried in consular courts and were exempt from Egyptian law. Regarding the imprisonment of the traffickers, he writes in his memoirs that even if the Egyptian prison code states that a prisoner sentenced for a crime can be released under good conduct after three-quarters of time served, the grace is always denied to these.

== Personality ==
In an obituary written following Russell Pasha's death in 1954, it is said of him:

For everybody connected with the control of narcotics, Russell Pasha was not only a legendary figure but a man well known from the days of the Advisory Committee of the League of Nations where, ever since his first appearance in January 1930, he impressed all those who had the honour and the pleasure of working with him with his great intelligence, his profound knowledge of everything connected with narcotics and his keen sense of humour which showed a deep understanding of human nature.

== Books ==
- The Wild Ducks and Various of Egypt (1932)
- Egyptian Service: 1902–1946 (John Murray, 1949)

== Retirement and later years of life ==
Russell Pasha retired in 1946 and dedicated the rest of his life to salmon fishing. He died in London on 10 April 1954.
