= Paul Carbone =

French mobster

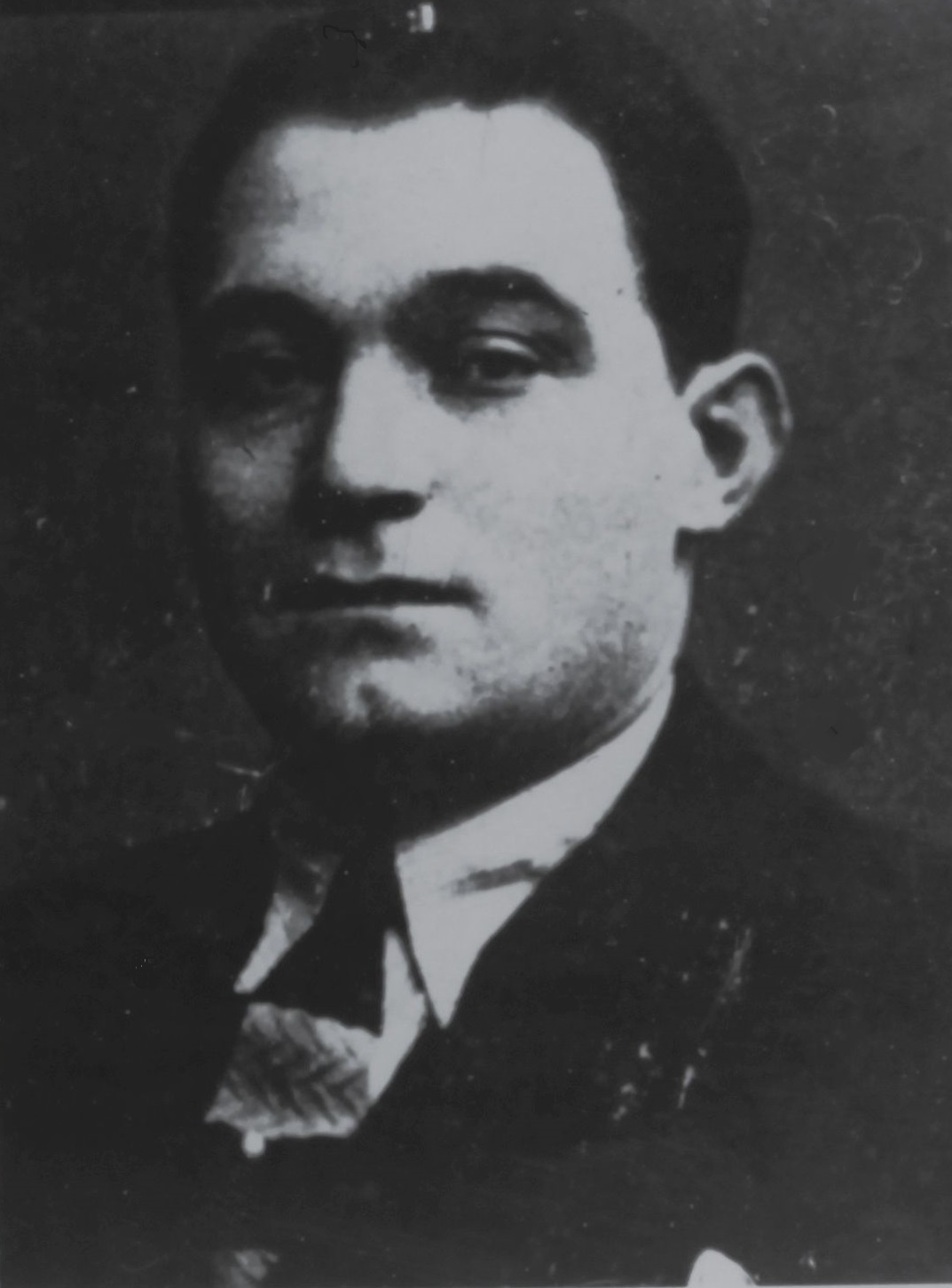
- Paul Carbone circa 1934
- Born: 1 February 1894; Propriano, Corsica
- Died: 16 December 1943 (aged 49); Chalon-sur-Saône, France
- Cause of death: Assassination
- Other names: Paul Bonnaventure Carbone; Emperor of Marseille
- Occupations: Gangster, pimp

Paul Bonnaventure Carbone (1 February 1894 – 16 December 1943) was a Corsican criminal involved in the Marseille underworld from the 1920s until his death in 1943. He was known as the Emperor of Marseille. Associated with François Spirito, who would become one of the leaders of the French Connection, Carbone inspired the film Borsalino which featured Alain Delon and Jean-Paul Belmondo.

== Early life ==
Paul Carbone was born in the southern Corsican village of Propriano in 1894. He was a descendant of Napoleon's nurse Illeria Carbone. When Carbone was a small child, his family moved to the impoverished Panier suburb of Marseille alongside numerous other Corsicans. He attended school there and was a hard-working pupil. When Carbone was 12, his father died, and he left school to support his mother and two younger brothers. He took any job that he could find to bring money into the family.

When Carbone was about fifteen, he moved to Alexandria, Egypt, where he started pimping. Much of the money he earned was sent back to his mother in France. His success had angered some rival pimps. In 1913, three pimps kidnapped Carbone and left him buried up to his neck in sand in the desert. He was rescued three days later by François Spirito, who had heard the three pimps boasting about what they had done in a bar. Carbone and Spirito struck up a life-long friendship and business partnership. Spirito was also a pimp and part of a network that brought women from Paris to work in Egyptian brothels.

Once recovered from his ordeal, Carbone wanted to leave Egypt and persuaded Spirito to go to Shanghai with him. There, the pair got involved in opium smuggling. This lasted for about a year until the outbreak of World War I, when they returned to France to enlist. After being arrested for assault, Carbone was sent to the Bat' d'Af' unit. (The Bat' d'Af' was a French military unit, based in Algeria, consisting of men with criminal records or serious disciplinary problems.) Whilst serving on the Western front Carbone met and became friends with Simon Sabiani, the future mayor of Marseille. Carbone was awarded a medal for his bravery during the conflict.

== Interwar period ==
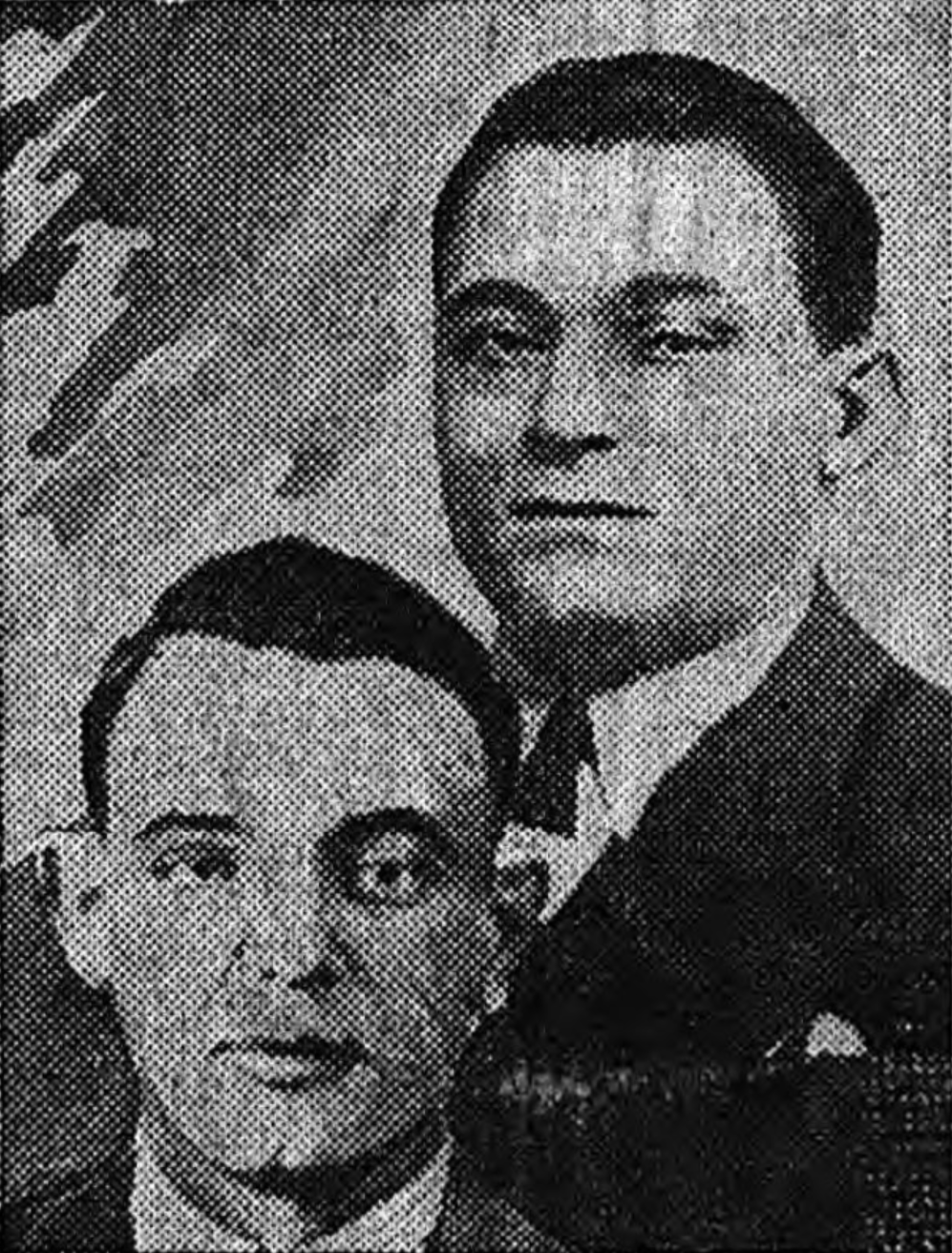
Paul Carbone (top) and François Spirito

After the war ended, Carbone and Spirito left for South America. In Peru they started pimping and soon had 20 women working for them. The pair returned to Marseille in 1919, where they engaged in pimping and opium smuggling.

The Carbone-Spirito clan gained more and more influence in the Marseille underworld. By the late 1920s, they were involved in prostitution, white slavery, protection rackets and various forms of trafficking. They were involved in drug trafficking, especially heroin and cocaine, and set up a laboratory in Bandol, near Marseille to refine the raw opium from Egypt, Turkey and Indochina into heroin, some of which was sent to Lucky Luciano in the United States. Owning a bar on rue Pavilion, the Amical Bar, and the Beauvau Restaurant on rue Beauvau, the empire was run from these establishments. In Marseille alone, it had more than 25 brothels, mostly staffed by young Jewish women forced into prostitution. Carbone also had prostitution networks in Argentina, Egypt and Spain.

Although Pernod Fils had been banned in France in 1914, Carbone imported it from a distillery in Tarragona, Spain. After economic sanctions were imposed on Italy in 1936 because of the Second Italo-Ethiopian War, Carbone smuggled 34 tons of Parmesan cheese from Italy for Marseille's Italian population. During the Spanish Civil War, Carbone sold arms to Francisco Franco's supporters.

Carbone and Spirito were also active in Paris, where the Prefect of Police, Jean Chiappe, was a friend of Carbone. They initially set up an upmarket brothel in Montmartre. All brothels in Paris were then controlled by an obese Italian, Charles Codebo. Carbone and Spirito muscled in on his operation. With the money made in Paris, they opened brothels all over France and staffed them with women from Europe and South America.

During the interwar period, Carbone and Spirito allied with the mayor of Marseille, Simon Sabiani, and acted as his enforcers. In return, they received political protection. When Carbone and Spirito were arrested for the murder of the financial consultant Albert Prince in 1934, Sabiani came to their aid. After the 6 February 1934 riots in Paris, Carbone sent in his thugs to intimidate the dockers of Marseille who were striking.

== World War II ==
During World War II, Carbone and Spirito joined the Carlingue, which collaborated with the Germans in France; in return, the local civilian authorities in Marseille were expected to ignore their criminal activities. They also profiteered from black marketeering, supplying German soldiers with hard-to-obtain goods.

== Death ==
Carbone died on 16 December 1943 in a train crash caused by the Resistance sabotaging the train, blowing it up. The train had been targeted as it contained mostly German soldiers on leave. Carbone had his legs crushed and one severed at the knee. He is reputed to have sung songs to cheer up the other victims whilst smoking his last cigarette before he died. However, his long-term mistress, Germaine Germain, better known as Manouche, reported that he was taken to a local hospital, where he died hours later.

== See also ==
- List of Corsican people

== Bibliography ==
- Albarelli, H. P. (2009). A Terrible Mistake: The Murder of Frank Olson and the CIA's Secret Cold War Experiments. Trine Day. ISBN 9780984185887.
- Block, Alan A. (1994). Space, Time, and Organized Crime. Transaction Publishers. ISBN 9781412834926.
- Buisson, Patrick (2009). 1940-1945 Années érotiques -: De la Grande Prostituée à la revanche des mâles (in French). Albin Michel. ISBN 9782226200143.
- Cockburn, Alexander; Clair, Jeffrey St (1998). Whiteout: The CIA, Drugs, and the Press. Verso. ISBN 9781859841396.
- Garrett, Martin (2006). Provence: A Cultural History. Oxford University Press. ISBN 9780195309577.
- Gingeras, Ryan (2014). Heroin, Organized Crime, and the Making of Modern Turkey. Oxford University Press. ISBN 9780198716020.
- Kitson, Simon (2014). Police and Politics in Marseille, 1936-1945. BRILL. ISBN 9789004265233.
- Levendel, Isaac; Weisz, Bernard (2011). Hunting Down the Jews: Vichy, the Nazis and Mafia Collaborators in Provence, 1942-1944. Enigma Books. ISBN 9781936274321.
- Newsday (1974). The Heroin Trail. Holt, Rinehart and Winston. ISBN 9780030138416.
- Ottaviani, Thierry (2016). La Corse pour les Nuls poche (in French). edi8. ISBN 9782754089494.
- Rovner, Eduardo Sáenz (2008). The Cuban Connection: Drug Trafficking, Smuggling, and Gambling in Cuba from the 1920s to the Revolution. Univ of North Carolina Press. ISBN 9780807831755.
- United States Brewers' Association (1916). The Year Book of the United States Brewers' Association. The Association.
