= Operation Underworld =

World War II US intelligence cooperation with organized crime

Operation Underworld was the United States government's code name for its co-operation with the Italian-American Mafia and Jewish organized crime figures from 1942 to 1945 during World War 2. The operation aimed to counter Axis spies and saboteurs along the US northeastern seaboard ports, to avoid wartime labor-union strikes, and to limit theft by black marketeers of vital materiel.

== Background ==
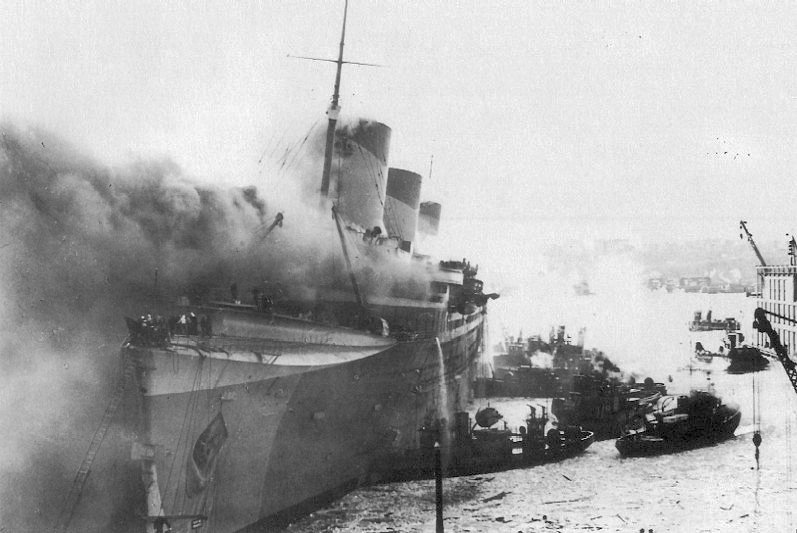
Suspicion about Mafia sabotage in the fire and sinking of Normandie (renamed Lafayette for war service), led to Operation Underworld

In the first three months after the Japanese attack on Pearl Harbor on December 7, 1941, the US lost 120 merchant ships to German U-boats and surface raiders in the Battle of the Atlantic, and in February 1942 SS Normandie, a captured French ocean liner that was being refitted as the troop ship Lafayette in the Port of New York, caught fire, capsized, and sank into the Hudson River, allegedly sabotaged by arsonists. Mafia boss and one-time Murder, Inc. head Albert "Mad Hatter" Anastasia allegedly claimed responsibility for the sabotage, according to Jewish mobster Meyer Lansky and Charles "Lucky" Luciano, one of the bosses of the New York Mafia's Five Families and the founder of the American Mafia's Commission.

The United States government portrayed the loss of Normandie as an accident, and no evidence was ever produced linking Axis spies to the loss of Normandie. After the war, Axis records claimed no sabotage operation had existed, and no evidence has ever been produced by the Allies to indicate there had been underworld sabotage. In 1954, a report looking into the contacts between Office of Naval Intelligence {ONI) and the New York Mafia by New York State Commissioner of Investigation William B. Herlands also did not mention Anastasia's role in the sabotage.

== Operation Underworld ==
Fears about possible sabotage or disruption of the waterfront led Commander Charles R. Haffenden of the US Navy Office of Naval Intelligence (ONI) Third Naval District in New York to set up a special security unit. He sought the help of Joseph Lanza, a racketeer and member of the Genovese crime family, who ran the Fulton Fish Market, to get intelligence about the New York waterfront, control the labor unions, and identify possible refueling and resupply operations for German submarines with the help of the fishing industry along the East Coast of the United States.

To cover Lanza's activities, Haffenden also approached Lansky, who had previously broken up pro-Nazi German American Bund rallies, including one in Manhattan's Yorkville German neighborhood that he personally disrupted alongside fourteen associates. He solicited Lansky's help in reaching Lansky's partner Luciano. Luciano had been tried and convicted in 1936 for compulsory prostitution and running a prostitution racket after District Attorney Thomas E. Dewey had investigated him for years and was serving a 30- to 50-year sentence at Dannemora.

Luciano agreed to cooperate with authorities in hopes of consideration for early release from prison. On 12 January 1943 Lanza pled guilty to six counts of extortion and also for conspiracy. He was sentenced to seven and half to fifteen years in prison. There was no mention of Lanza's cooperation with ONI during his trial. Lanza's lawyer requested leniency, claiming he had been an asset to the community, referring to his work with the union. Judge Wallace was unimpressed, contrarily describing Lanza as an "unmitigated nuisance to the community". His imprisonment marked the end of his involvement in Operation Underworld.

For his cooperation, Luciano was moved to a more convenient and comfortable open prison in Great Meadows in May 1942. Luciano's influence in stopping sabotage remains unclear, but authorities did note that strikes on the docks stopped after Luciano's attorney Moses Polakoff contacted underworld figures with influence over the longshoremen and their unions. In 1946, Luciano's sentence was commuted after he had served 9½ years. He was deported to Italy as part of the provisions of his sentence being commuted and died in 1962 in Naples.
