= Cannabis policy of the Franklin D. Roosevelt administration =

During the administration of American President Franklin D. Roosevelt (1933–1945), the United States saw its first federal-level efforts to control cannabis as a drug.

While Roosevelt is known for his opposition to prohibition of alcohol, which was repealed in 1933 with the passage of the Twenty-first Amendment to the United States Constitution, in a 1935 radio address he also advocated that the United States apply the rulings of the Second International Opium Convention, which along with opiates also restricted the non-medicinal use of cannabis.

Federal Bureau of Narcotics chief Harry Anslinger garnered support from the president and Congress for the passage of the Marihuana Tax Act, which was signed by Roosevelt and took effect on 1 October, 1937.
