= Malachi Harney =

American federal investigator (1895–1984)

M.L. Harney
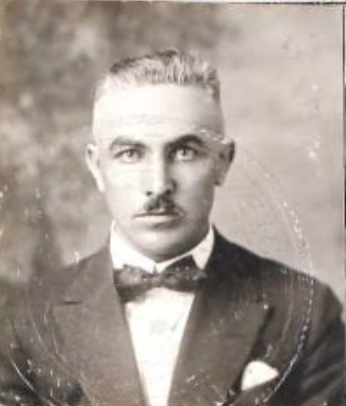

Northwest District Administrator Bureau of Prohibition
- Appointed by: Secretary Andrew W. Mellon

Deputy Commissioner Federal Bureau of Narcotics

Special Coordinator for Narcotics Department of the Treasury

Personal details
- Born: 11 June 1895 Duluth, Minnesota, US
- Died: 24 February 1984 (aged 88) Hennepin County, Minnesota
- Resting place: Fort Snelling National Cemetery
- Education: University of Minnesota

Military service
- Allegiance: United States
- Branch/service: United States Marine Corps
- Rank: Second Lieutenant
- Battles/wars: World War I

Malachi Lawrence Harney (11 June 1895 – 24 February 1984) was an American federal law enforcement investigator for the United States Department of the Treasury and the Federal Bureau of Narcotics and the coauthor of several nonfiction books related to law enforcement with John C. Cross. During the Prohibition era, Harney was Eliot Ness's boss at Treasury, responsible for the arrest and capture of Al Capone. Later in his career, Harney was one of the strongest advocates of anti-drug policies in the United States, publishing articles and giving speeches espousing the drug war.

The historical consensus today maintains that M.L. Harney was a racist who propagated racially motivated policies in law enforcement, especially in the creation and maintenance of anti-marijuana practices, and the rejection of black police officers in America.

== Early life ==
Harney was a second-generation Irish American, born to parents James Harney and Anna (Ryan) Harney. His parents immigrated from Thurles, County Tipperary around the time of the Great Famine.

In 1917, Harney earned a Bachelor of Science degree in agriculture from the University of Minnesota.

Shortly afterward, during World War I, Harney was commissioned as a second lieutenant in the United States Marine Corps, and fought in Europe.

== Law enforcement ==
=== Prohibition era ===
In 1920, Harney joined the Bureau of Internal Revenue as a dry agent. By 1925, Harney was already an assistant director, or "Dry Administrator," in the Bureau of Prohibition, responsible for all federal agents in Minnesota. His duties involved investigating all violations of the Volstead Act. By 1929, Harney declared St. Cloud and Stearns County were "no longer wet," and were now "just as bad or worse" as Winona, Ramsay, Dakota, Morrison, and Benton counties. By 1930, Harney was the director of the bureau's Northwest District, including all of Minnesota, North and South Dakota, Iowa and Nebraska.

At the Chicago prohibition office, Harney oversaw Eliot Ness and the other Untouchables and dry agents at Treasury and was responsible for the arrest and capture of Al Capone. Harney intervened when the Capone squad was disbanded after the trial that initially sent Capone to jail, and Ness desperately attempted to keep his squad together. Harney wrote to headquarters on behalf of Ness:

"I do not need to elaborate on the situation which confronts me in Chicago. I have an ambition to make a real and lasting impression on the hoodlums who have monopolized the illicit liquor industry in this vicinity, and I need the assistance of every capable Investigator that I can acquire."

After Capone was convicted, Harney promoted Ness, who moved into a corner office of the Customs Building in Chicago. In September 1932, Harney's brother, James Gerald Harney, who was a dry agent under Harney's command, was shot and killed during an investigation in Tamarack, Minnesota.

=== Bureau of Narcotics ===
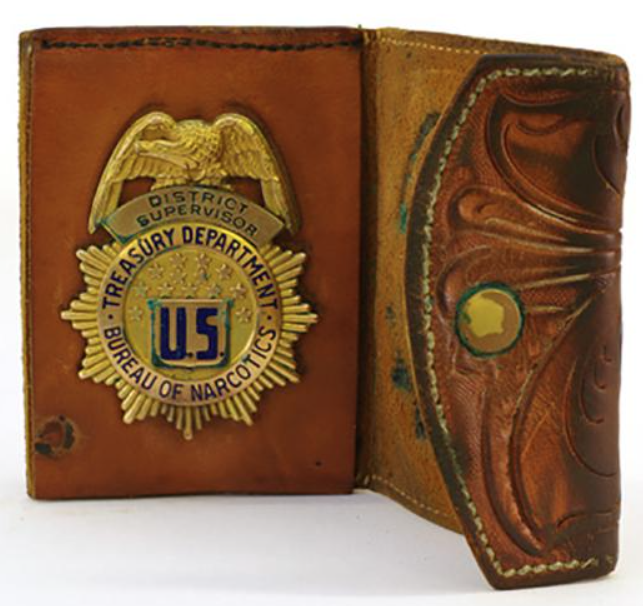
Federal Bureau of Narcotics district supervisor badge

When the Federal Bureau of Narcotics was created in 1930 and Harry J. Anslinger was made its commissioner, Harney was appointed to be Anslinger's staff assistant, while still maintaining his duties at Prohibition until his replacement was found.

In 1936, Harney became assistant commissioner for the entire agency. As assistant commissioner, Harney coordinated the efforts of agents such as George Hunter White, Garland H. Williams, and Charlie Siragusa.

Later, Harney became the Chief Coordinator of all six Treasury Department enforcement agencies in the fight against illegal narcotics, also acting as technical assistant to the Secretary of Enforcement at Treasury.

As Harney explained the differences in an article that he wrote for the University of California Press:

"It should be borne in mind that the Bureau are confined to a rather narrow range of specifically enumerated drugs. These are opium... alkaloids and derivatives of opium (including such products as morphine, heroin, codeine, Dilaudid), and semisynthetic derivatives of opium... wholly synthetic substances... opiates... the coca leaf and its derivatives (cocaine)... marihuana... cannabis... The Federal Bureau of Narcotics does not have responsibilities in connection with many other chemicals generally described as dangerous drugs such as... barbiturates, amphetamines, tranquilizers... hallucinogens..."

In 1951, Harney advocated for what he called "extra duty pay," for all federal investigative officers and agents for time undercover. He testified in support of the Civil Service Commission recommendation 21.

By 1952, Harney was special assistant to Treasury Secretary John W. Snyder, responsible for housecleaning the department.

Harney retired from the Treasury in 1956.

=== The Informer in Law Enforcement ===
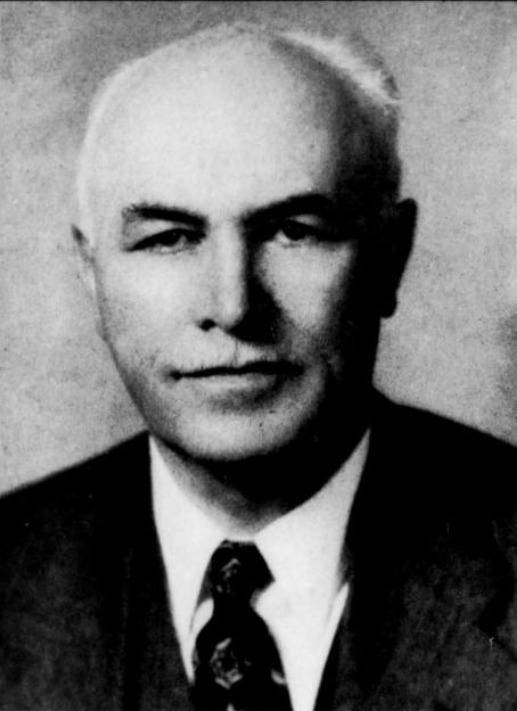
Harney in 1955, a year before his retirement from federal service

In the 1950s, Harney and John C. Cross developed a system to identify the motivations of informants in law enforcement and espionage.

The six basic motivations for an informant in law enforcement were identified as:

1. Fear
2. Revenge
3. Perverse
4. Egotistical
5. Mercenary
6. Repentance or desire to reform

They also identified the 4 basic motivations of a traitor in espionage.

1. Money
2. Ideology
3. Compromise
4. Ego

=== Springfield Department of Public Safety ===
After retiring from 35 years in federal service, Harney was hired to develop the Division of Narcotic Control in the Springfield Department of Public Safety. He worked to develop this division for two and a half years, before becoming Springfield's first Superintendent of Narcotic Control. He served in this position until his resignation in 1960.

== Personal life ==
Harney died in 1984 in Minnesota at the age of 84.

Harney's complete personnel files and all case files and correspondences related to Harney during his days as a dry agent were destroyed by the National Archives and Records Administration in 1991 at the request of Steve W. Milline at the Treasury Department.
