= New York Academy of Medicine =

American health policy organization

The New York Academy of Medicine
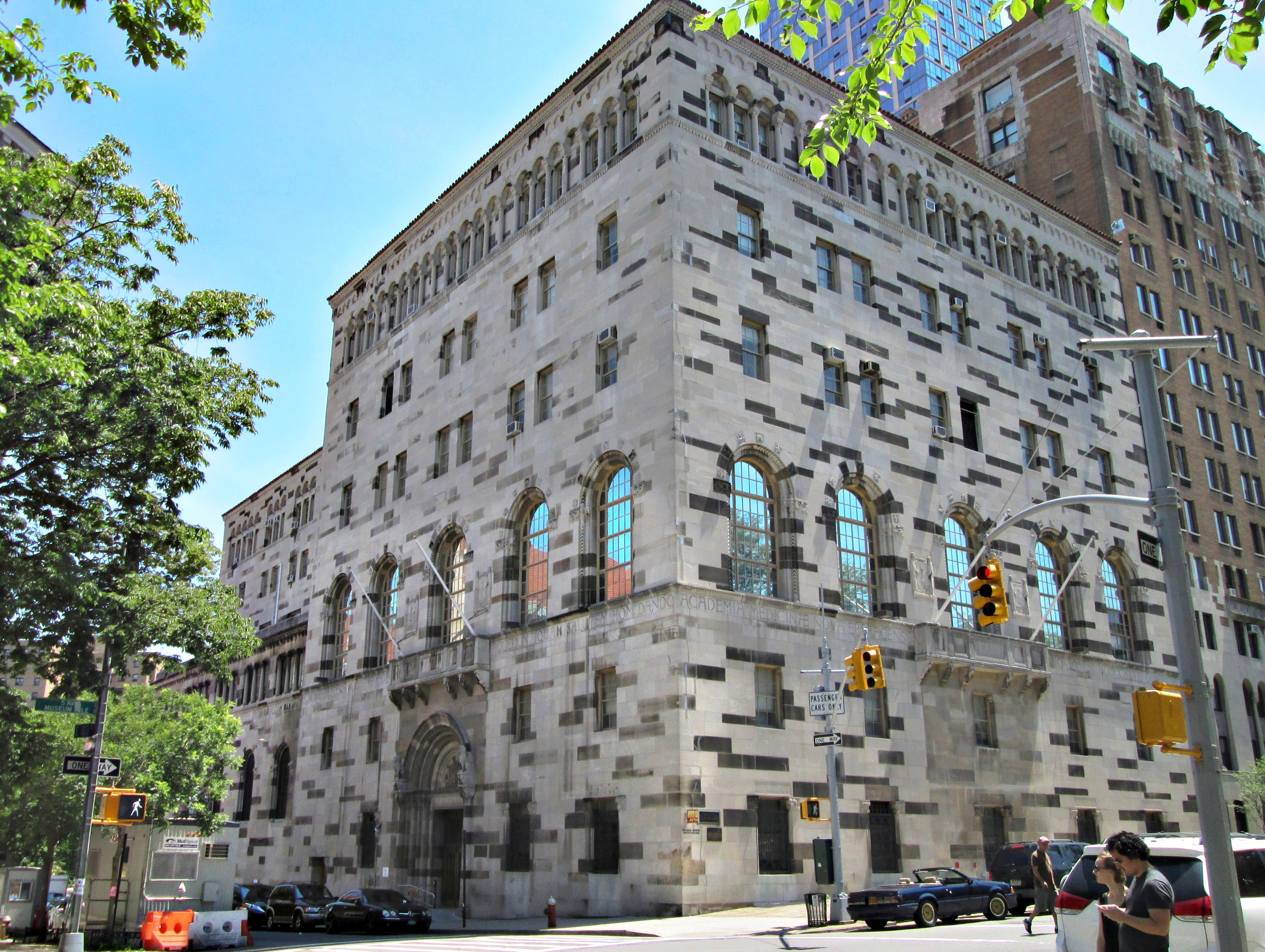
- The Academy's building was built in 1926 in an eclectic style
- Formation: January 6, 1847; 179 years ago
- Location: 1216 Fifth Avenue at 103rd Street, New York, NY 10029
- Coordinates: 40.792088°N 73.952336°W
- Website: Official website

The New York Academy of Medicine (NYAM) is a health policy and advocacy organization founded in 1847 by a group of leading New York metropolitan area physicians as a voice for the medical profession in medical practice and public health reform. The early leaders of NYAM were invested in the reform movements of the day and worked to improve public health by focusing on the living conditions of the poor. In 1866, NYAM was instrumental in the establishment of the Metropolitan Board of Health, the first modern municipal public health authority in the United States and the precursor of the New York State Department of Health. In recent years NYAM has functioned as an effective advocate in public health reform, as well as a major center for health education. NYAM's work now focuses on advancing urban health in New York City and around the world. Today, NYAM has over three-thousand fellows, that include doctors, nurses, health care administrators, and professionals in all fields dedicated to maintaining and improving health.

== History ==
=== Founding ===
The New York Academy of Medicine was founded on January 6, 1847. It began on December 8, 1846 with a notice being published in newspapers, requesting the city's doctors to meet three days later at the Lyceum of Natural History. It asked for cooperation of medical professionals in elevating the profession's character, advancing its interests, creating medical facilities, promoting harmony among members, and offering means of mutual improvement. The three signatories were doctors Valentine Mott, president of the New York University School of Medicine, Alexander H. Stevens, president of the Columbia University College of Physicians and Surgeons, and Isaac Wood, president of the Medical Society of the City and County of New York. John Stearns, later first president of the academy, was made chairman for the first meeting.

In 1854, the academy was divided into sections by medical specialty or scientific discipline. Early sections included Theory and Practice, Obstetrics and Diseases of Women and Children, Anatomy, Surgery, and Chemistry.

In 1939, the academy prepared Mayor Fiorello LaGuardia's LaGuardia Commission report, which when released in 1944 infuriated Harry Anslinger and his campaign against marijuana.

During World War I, the academy made plans to sell its building at 10 West 44th Street in order to build an addition to its building on 15 West 43rd Street. A man named Louis Sherry (of Sherry's hotel and restaurant) made an offer on the property, which the academy reluctantly accepted around 1918. Sherry's offer included renting the building for $5,000 per year for ten years with the option to purchase the property outright for $100,000 within five years. While the academy originally paid $120,000 for the property, their special advisory Finance Committee urged them to take the deal. A peripheral fallout of this agreement was that the academy's live-in janitor, Felix Wesstrom, lost his living quarters. To compensate him for the loss, the academy increased his monthly salary by $30.

== Architecture ==
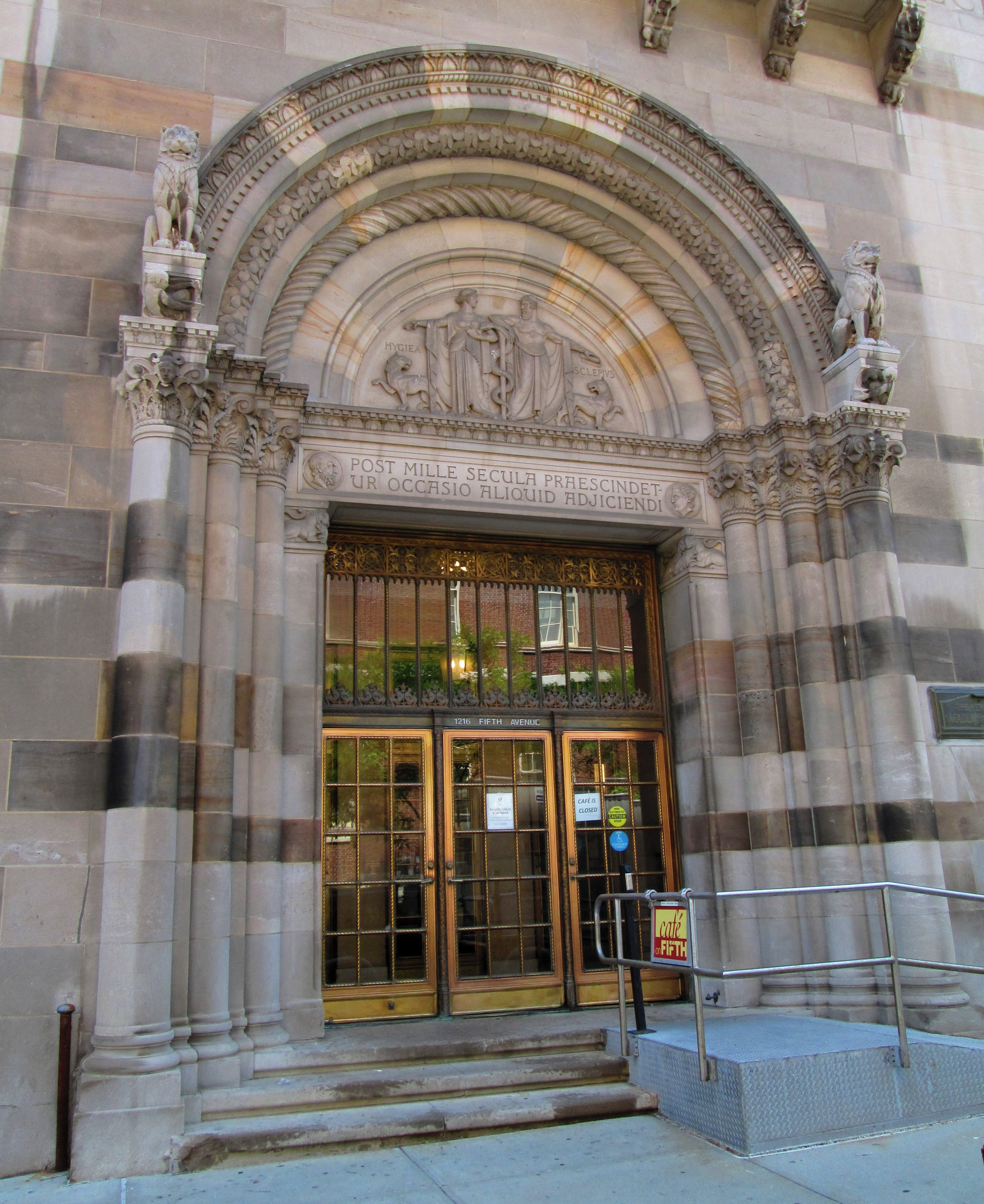
The building's entrance

In 1926, the Academy moved to a new six-story building designed by York and Sawyer in an eclectic style; including touches of the Byzantine Revival and Lombardian Romanesque styles. The building is at East 103rd Street at the corner of Fifth Avenue, across from Central Park in the East Harlem neighborhood of Manhattan, New York City. Initial funding for the new building came from the Carnegie Corporation, approximately one million dollars towards the building, and the Rockefeller Foundation, providing 1.25 million dollars for an endowment.

=== Exterior ===
The building's exterior uses a combination of varieties of limestone and sandstone. The main entrance, at 103rd Street, uses a series columns with Romanesque caps, topped with statues of lions. The doors are ornate bronze with floral designs and small figures of Asclepius, god of medicine and physicians, and Hygieia, daughter of Asclepius and goddess of health. The two gods are also carved into the entranceway's tympanum, attended by dogs, symbolizing vigilance and keeping death and illness away. The exterior also features many Latin inscriptions from notable authors, including Cicero, Hippocrates, Juvenal, Seneca the Younger, and Virgil. The first floor windows have exterior ornamental bronze grills, decorated in a Romanesque design. Those windows' lintels have figures of gods and fauna symbolic of medicine and additional Latin inscriptions.

=== Interior ===
The building's design includes many decorative elements that evoke health and the history of the medicine. In addition to the exterior designs, other animals feature as bronze insets of the Levanto marble main lobby floor such as the goat (symbolizing lusty, reproductive power), snakes (the symbol of the god Asclepius, signifying long life and rejuvenation), rooster (emblem of fatherhood and restorer of health), goose (emblem of motherhood), and the mandrake root (believed in folklore to have curative properties). The lobby floor also has a variegated marble mosaic pattern and white Traniville marble border. The walls are made of Mankato marble, and the ceiling is square-beamed with hand-painted Arabesque designs of fauna symbolic of medicine.

== Library ==
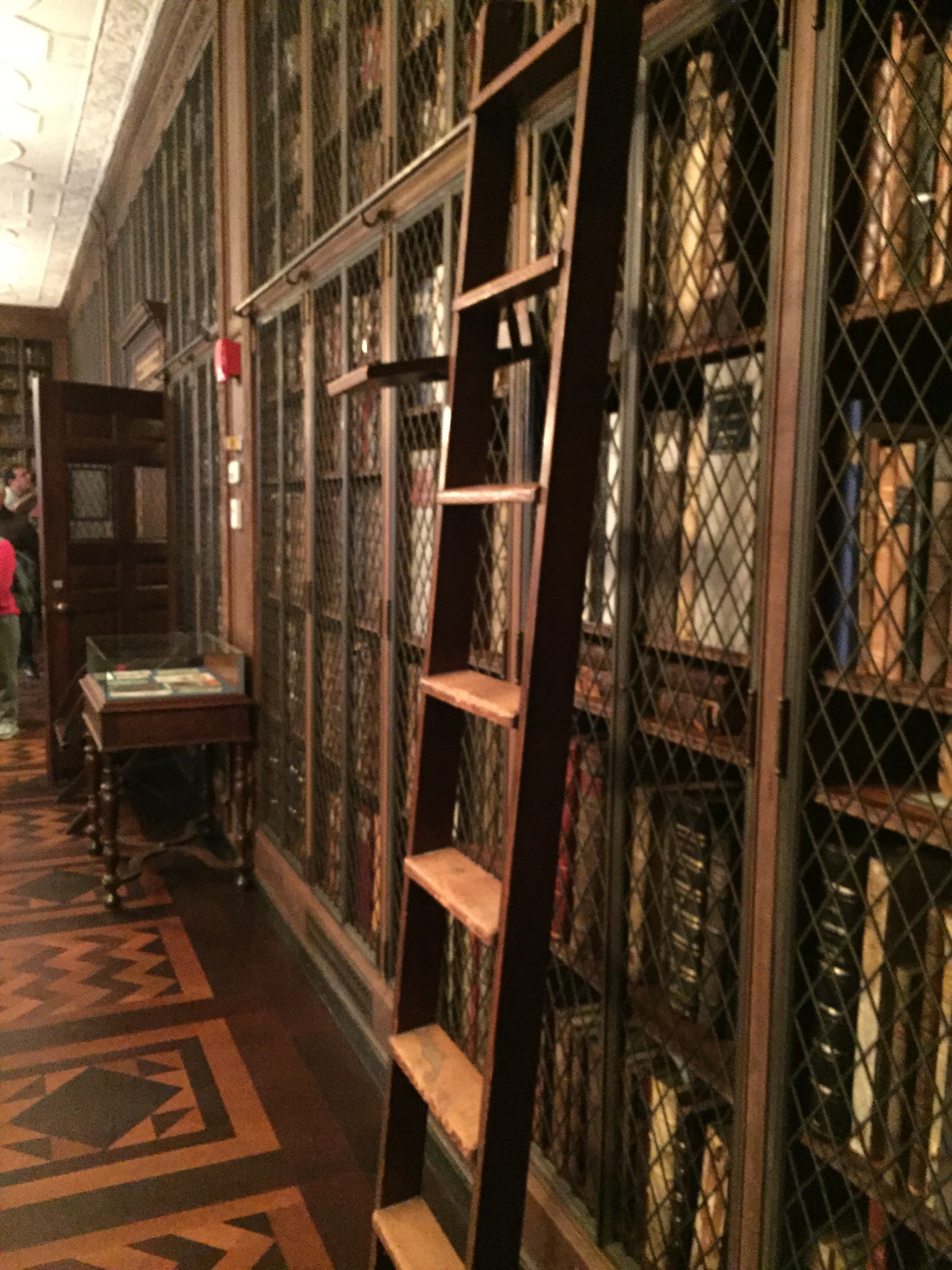
The Coller Rare Book Reading Room

The Academy Library is home to one of the most significant collections of medicine and public health and is open to the general public. It was first opened in 1847 when the academy first opened, but was not open to the public until 1878. The library includes about 550,000 volumes and original writings by Sigmund Freud and a prototype of George Washington's dentures, constructed from actual teeth that were donated. The library is part of the New York Academy of Medicine's Center for the History of Medicine and Public Health and also includes the Coller Rare Book Reading Room. The library's historical materials are conserved in the Gladys Brooks Book and Paper Conservation Laboratory.

Under President Walter Belknap James (served 1915–1918), in May 1918, the Library Council decided to build an addition on its building at 15 West 43rd Street and, consequently, to sell its property at 10 West 44th Street. Around this same time, the academy increased its number of fellows from 1,200 to 1,300. There was also a requirement for the fellows to be in practice for five years (as opposed to its previous requirements of three years).

=== Wartime years ===
During World War I, the library (at its 15 West 43rd Street location) opened its doors to aid in wartime efforts. Not only was the library open to all, including soldiers, it also allowed the use of one of its prime spaces, Hosack Hall, for events related to the war, and additional rooms within the building for Medical Reserve Corps examinations.

=== Later years ===
By 1947, the library had 252,000 volumes and was the second-largest medical library in the U.S., after the Surgeon General's Library (now the National Library of Medicine). The library was open to the public, although only fellows and some paid subscribers had borrowing privileges. At the time, the Librarian was Archibald Malloch, who had doubled the collection while Librarian, 1935 to 1949. Janet Doe succeeded him, followed by Gertrude L. Annan. These individuals were regarded by peers as "giants in their field". The library also has a Rare Book Room, which contains rare bibliographic works and medical artifacts, including a collection of cookbooks. In the early 1900s, the New York Public Library ceased adding to its own medical collection and donated approximately 22,000 medical works, in 1949, to the New York Academy of Medicine. This led the academy, for a time, to be the only public medical source in the New York metropolitan area.

=== Holdings ===
The library holds the Edwin Smith Papyrus, an ancient Egyptian medical text and the oldest known surgical treatise on trauma. In 1928, the New York Academy of Medicine purchased the collection of incunable manuscripts of E.C. Streeter which was exhibited during the History of Science Society's meeting held in New York on 28 and 29 December. There were at least 130 books printed before 1501 which had strongly influenced the history of medicine at the time of their publication. Contents to be exhibited were mainly selected by Arnold C. Klebs.

The library also houses the archives of many health-related organizations that serve as primary sources for the history of medical education and practice in New York.

The academy produces a website for providing context and search capability to grey literature through its Grey Literature Report, which is published bimonthly. The resources cited in the Grey Literature Report are cataloged and indexed using Medical Subject Headings.

== Awards ==
Every year since 1929, the academy has rewarded individuals who delivered exceptional contributions. There are currently five categories in these awards:

- John Stearns Medal for Distinguished Contributions in Medicine. Awarded since 1992 and named after John Stearns, the first president of the academy.
- Stephen Smith Medal for Distinguished Contributions in Public Health. Awarded since 2005 and named after Stephen Smith, a public health pioneer.
- Academy Medal for Distinguished Contributions in Health Policy. Awarded since 2008.
- Academy Medal for Distinguished Contributions in Biomedical Science. Awarded since 1929, it is the Academy's oldest prize.
- Academy Plaque for Exceptional Service to the Academy. Awarded since 1952.

== See also ==
- Journal of Urban Health, the New York Academy of Medicine's journal
