= LaGuardia Committee report =

Study into the effects of smoking cannabis

Frontis of the La Guardia Committee report on cannabis.

The LaGuardia Committee report was an official scientific report published in 1944 that questioned the prohibition of cannabis in the United States. The report contradicted claims by the U.S. Treasury Department that smoking marijuana deteriorates physical and mental health, assists in criminal behavior and juvenile delinquency, is physically addictive, and is a "gateway" drug to more dangerous drugs.

The report was prepared by the New York Academy of Medicine, on behalf of a commission appointed in 1939 by New York Mayor Fiorello LaGuardia, who was a strong opponent of the 1937 Marijuana Tax Act.

== Sociological conclusions ==
After more than five years of research the members of the committee drew up a catalog of 13 salient points with the conclusions they reached.

1. Marijuana is used extensively in the Borough of Manhattan but the problem is not as acute as it is reported to be in other sections of the United States.
2. The introduction of marijuana into this area is recent as compared to other localities.
3. The cost of marijuana is low and therefore within the purchasing power of most persons.
4. The distribution and use of marijuana is centered in Harlem.
5. The majority of marijuana smokers are Blacks and Latin-Americans.
6. The consensus among marijuana smokers is that the use of the drug creates a definite feeling of adequacy.
7. The practice of smoking marijuana does not lead to addiction in the medical sense of the word.
8. The sale and distribution of marijuana is not under the control of any single organized group.
9. The use of marijuana does not lead to morphine or heroin or cocaine addiction and no effort is made to create a market for these narcotics by stimulating the practice of marijuana smoking.
10. Marijuana is not the determining factor in the commission of major crimes.
11. Marijuana smoking is not widespread among school children.
12. Juvenile delinquency is not associated with the practice of smoking marijuana.
13. The publicity concerning the catastrophic effects of marijuana smoking in New York City is unfounded.

Therefore, according to the LaGuardia Report, the gateway drug theory is without foundation (points 7 and 9).

== Consequences ==
This 1944 report offended Harry Anslinger, head of the Federal Bureau of Narcotics, who claimed it was "unscientific". Anslinger denounced Mayor LaGuardia, the New York Academy of Medicine and the doctors who had worked for more than five years on the research. Anslinger said that they should not conduct more experiments or studies on marijuana without his personal permission. Anslinger interrupted each current research project on derivatives of cannabis between 1944 and 1945, and personally commissioned the American Medical Association to prepare a report which would reflect the position of the government.

The study conducted by AMA between 1944 and 1945 on Anslinger's personal request, having as objective to disprove the statements of the LaGuardia Report, leveraged again on racism, asserting that "of the experimental group, thirty-four men were black, and only one was white", and "those who smoked marijuana, became disrespectful of white soldiers and officers during military segregation".

Only in 1972, the same institutional source that spread the series of scientifically unfounded rumors about the dangers of cannabis admitted that "these stories were largely false" and that "with careful consideration of the documentation there is no confirmation of the existence of a causal relationship between marijuana use and the possible use of heroin". Thus, it was declared that the ban on cannabis was imposed and still subsisted "without any serious and comprehensive research had been conducted on the effects of marijuana".

== See also ==
- Indian Hemp Drugs Commission, an earlier 1893-94 study of cannabis
- Boggs Act
- Narcotic Control Act
- War on drugs
- Shafer Commission
- The Emperor Wears No Clothes
