= Charles Henry Ludovic Sharman =

Canadian police officer

Charles Henry Ludovic Sharman CMG CBE ISO
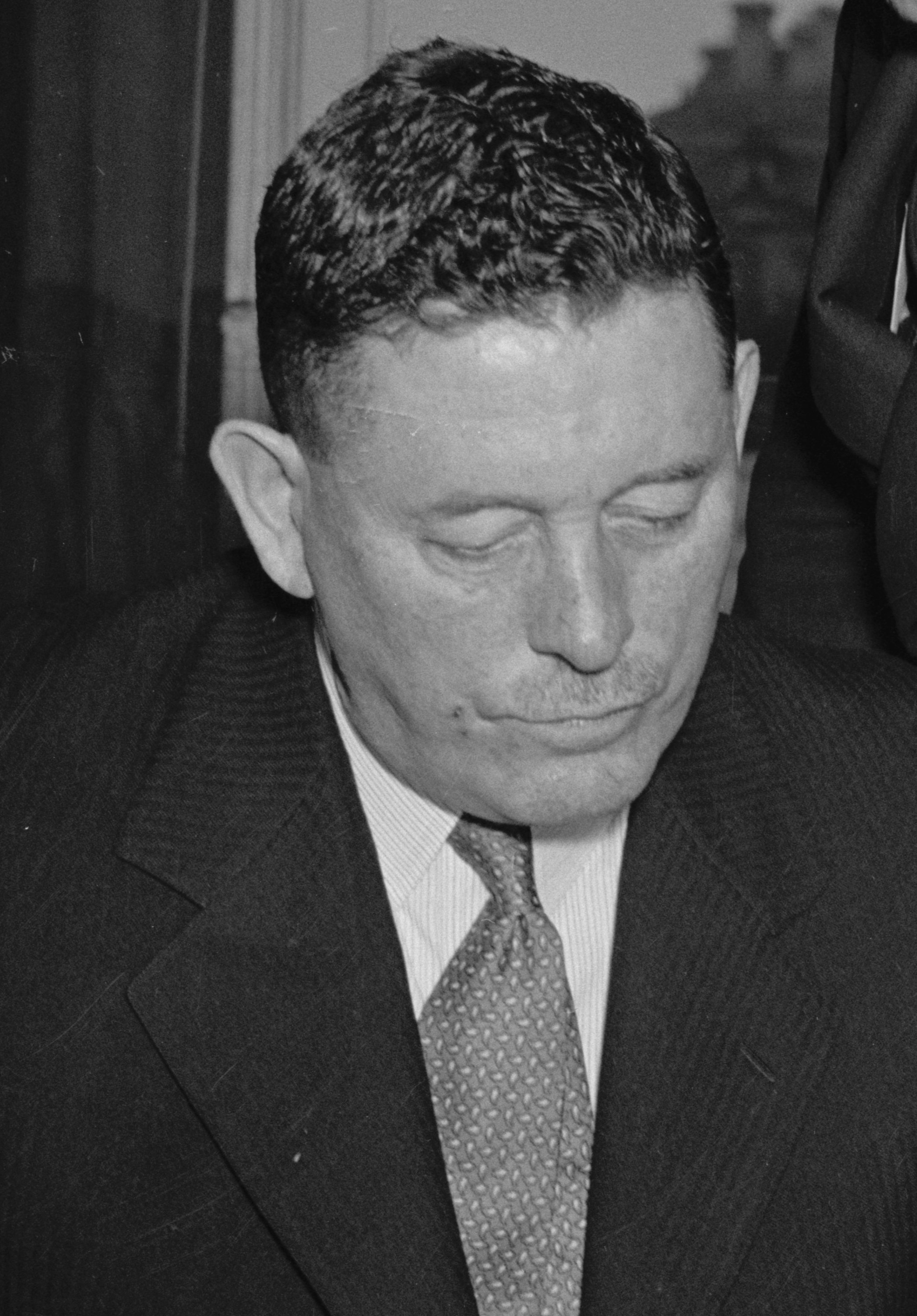
- Sharman in 1938

Chief of the Canadian Narcotics Service
- In office April 1927 – 1958
- Prime Minister: William Lyon Mackenzie King; R. B. Bennett; Louis St. Laurent; John Diefenbaker
- Minister: Department of Pensions and National Health
- Counterparts: Harry J. Anslinger, Russell Pasha, Adriaan Hendrik Sirks, Johannes Schober

Canadian representative on the Opium Advisory Committee
- In office 1934–1940 Serving with Malcolm Delevingne, John K. Caldwell, Elizabeth Washburne
- Secretary General: Joseph Avenol

Chairman of the United Nations Commission on Narcotic Drugs
- In office 1946–1948
- Secretary General: Trygve Lie

Chairman of the UN Drug Supervisory Body
- In office 1953–1958
- Secretary General: Dag Hammarskjöld

Personal details
- Born: 1881 Chelmsford, England
- Died: May 15, 1970 (aged 88–89)
- Education: St Lawrence College, Ramsgate
- Occupation: Civil servant, Soldier

Military service
- Rank: Colonel
- Unit: 5th Canadian Mounted Rifles; 1st Canadian Division
- Commands: First Field Battery, First Brigade, First Canadian Division; 16th Brigade, Canadian Artillery
- Battles/wars: Boer War; World War I; Second Battle of Ypres; Battle of Festubert; Givenchy-en-Gohelle; Ploegsteert Wood; Battle of Mount Sorrel; Battle of the Somme; Battle of Pozières; Battle of Vimy Ridge; Battle of Hill 70; Third Battle of Ypres; Battle of Amiens; Battle of the Canal du Nord; Hundred Days Offensive; Russian Civil War; Allied intervention; North Russia intervention

Charles Henry Ludovic Sharman CMG CBE ISO (1881 – May 15, 1970) was an English-born Canadian civil servant and soldier. He served as Chief of the Narcotics Division in the Department of Pensions and National Health.

Along with American Harry J. Anslinger, Sharman played a key role in the development of the global drug control regime. Sharman was the first Chair of the Commission on Narcotic Drugs in 1948.

During the First World War, Colonel Sharman commanded the 16th Brigade Canadian Field Artillery, part of the Canadian contribution to the North Russia Intervention during the Russian Civil War.
