= John K. Caldwell =

American diplomat

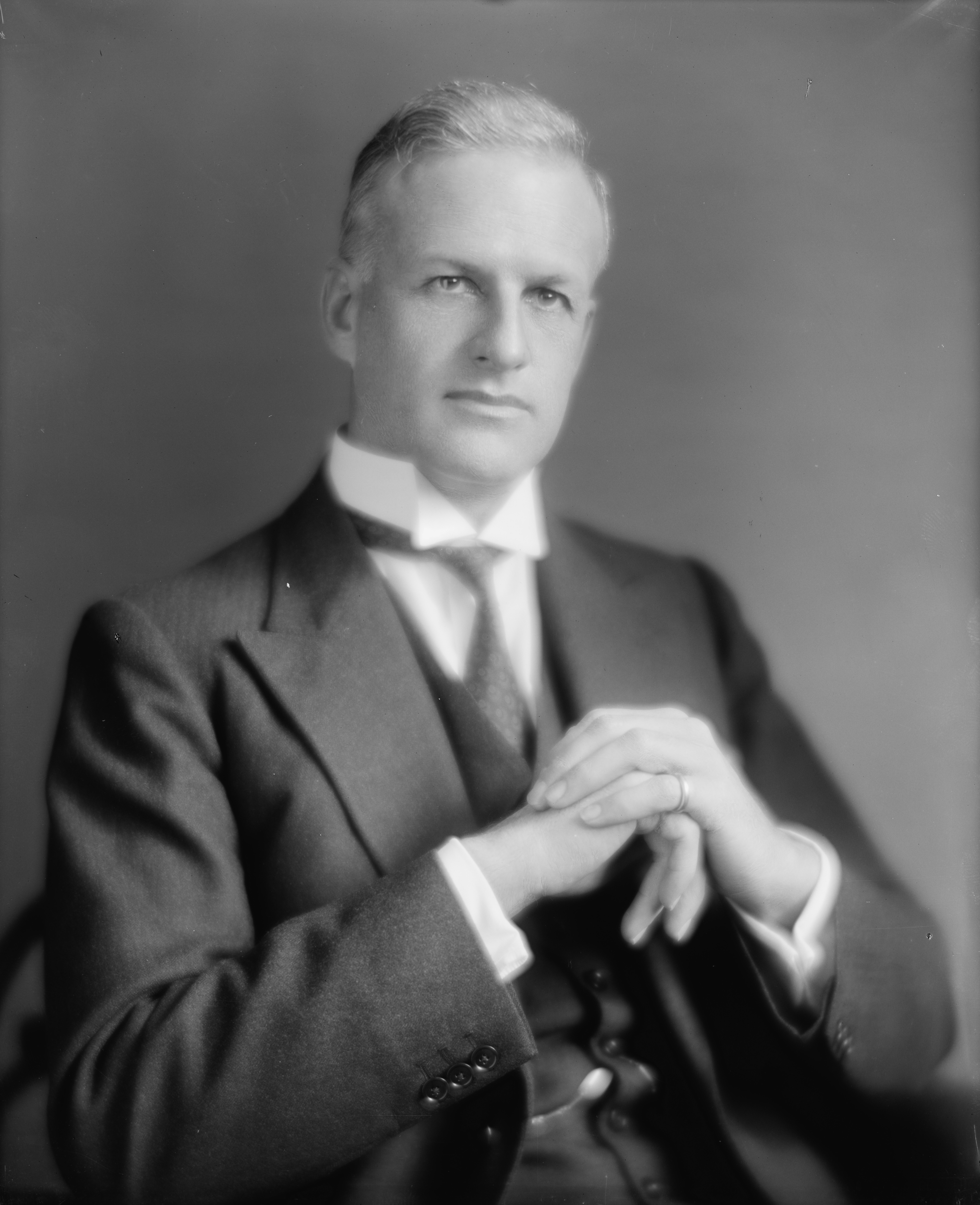

United States Ambassador to Ethiopia
- In office August 31, 1943 – August 26, 1945
- President: Franklin D. Roosevelt; Harry Truman
- Preceded by: Cornelius Van H. Engert (1936)
- Succeeded by: Felix Cole

Personal details
- Born: John Kenneth Caldwell; October 16, 1881 Piketon, Ohio U.S.
- Died: June 27, 1982 (aged 100) Monterey County, California U.S.
- Party: Republican
- Spouse: Grace
- Children: 4

John Kenneth Caldwell (October 16, 1881 – June 27, 1982) was an American diplomat who served as Minister Resident and Consul General to multiple countries.

== Early life ==
John Kenneth Caldwell was born on October 16, 1881, in Piketon, Ohio.

== Career ==
In 1906, he began his career in diplomacy. In 1909, he served as deputy consul general in Yokohama, Japan. In 1911, he served as vice consul in Port Arthur in the Japanese Kwantung Leased Territory. From 1920 to 1921, he served as a consul in Kobe, Japan and later served as the secretary of the Tokyo embassy from 1921 to 1924. From 1932 to 1935, he served as a consul general in Sydney, Australia. From 1935 to 1941, he served as a consul general in Tientsin, China and maintained his position after the Japanese took control of the city.

== World War I ==
From 1914 to 1920, he served as the consul in Vladivostok, Russia until he was reassigned to Kobe, Japan. During World War I he was tasked with aiding German prisoners of war in Siberia and later wrote a report on the Nikolayevsk incident that occurred during the Japanese intervention in Siberia.

== Narcotics control during the Prohibition era ==
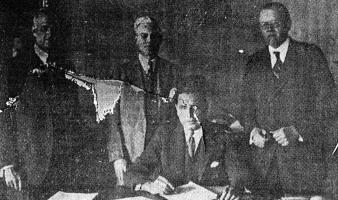
Caldwell and his delegation to the League of Nations in Geneva, 1931. Harry J. Anslinger is seated in the foreground.

For five years during the Prohibition era, Caldwell served on the advisory committee of the Federal Narcotics Control Board (FNCB), as the representative from the Department of State to facilitate the work of the Board, and the Secretary of State, in implementing tariffs on imported opium. The duties of the board were absorbed by the Federal Bureau of Narcotics (FBN) in 1930, and the FNCB was dissolved. Around this time, Caldwell served as US delegate to the League of Nations Opium Advisory Committee. Caldwell was also the US delegate to the Preliminary Conference on the Limitation of the Manufacture of Narcotic Drugs in London.

From March 27 to July 31, 1931, Caldwell served as the Chairman of the US delegation to the Conference on the Limitation of the Manufacture of Narcotic Drugs in Geneva. As Chairman, he was in charge of the delegation that included Narcotics Commissioner Harry J. Anslinger, Dr. Walter L. Treadway of Mental Hygiene, and California State Narcotic Commissioner Sanborn Young.

== Ambassador to Ethiopia ==
On April 14, 1943, he was appointed by President Franklin D. Roosevelt to serve as the ambassador to Ethiopia under the title of consul general and presented his credentials on August 31, 1943. However, his title was later changed to Envoy Extraordinary and Minister Plenipotentiary on October 7, 1943, and he presented his credentials again on December 9, 1943. He would continue to serve as the ambassador to Ethiopia until August 26, 1945.

== Later life ==
In 1948, he moved to Robles del Rio, California and later moved to Carmel, California in 1967. In 1971, his wife Grace died. In 1973, he wrote a memoir, but did not publish it. On June 27, 1982, he died.
