= Federal Narcotics Control Board =

Agency overview
- Formed: 26 May 1922
- Dissolved: 14 June 1930
- Superseding agency: Federal Bureau of Narcotics

The Federal Narcotics Control Board (FNCB) was a Prohibition era senior level law enforcement-related organization established by the United States Congress as part of the Narcotic Drugs Import and Export Act on 26 May 1922. The Board was composed of the Secretaries of State, Treasury, and Commerce.

The duties of the board were;

- To prohibit opium imports for other than medical purposes
- To limit exports to nations with an adequate licensing system

The duties of the board were further amended;

- To outlaw the manufacture of heroin in the U.S.

Congressional leadership in narcotics control was handled by Steven G. Porter, chairman of the House Committee on Foreign Affairs.

The duties of the board were transferred to the Commissioner of the Federal Bureau of Narcotics on 14 June 1930.

== Advisory Committee ==
Each of the three departments appointed a representative to the board's Advisory Committee. This committee had no powers, and functioned solely to facilitate the board.

Department of the Treasury Representative
Portrait	Name	Joined Board	Left Board
	Levi G. Nutt	May 26, 1922	1929
	Harry J. Anslinger	1929	June 14, 1930
Department of Commerce Representative
	Charles C. Concannon	?	December 14, 1929
	James O'Hara	December 14, 1929	?
Department of State Representative
	William B. Norris	?	1925
	John K. Caldwell	1926	June 14, 1930

== Leadership of the Board ==
The leadership of the board was composed of the Secretary of State, the Secretary of the Treasury, and the Secretary of Commerce.

Levi Nutt was appointed by the members to be Secretary of the Board, with the vested powers of conducting correspondence on behalf of the board, and signing permits on behalf of the board. Nutt, in his dual function as Deputy Commissioner of the Narcotics Division of the Prohibition Bureau, was also responsible for issuing all import licenses for opium and other drugs.

When Nutt was removed from his position due to the scandal surrounding his son's association with the gangster Arnold Rothstein, his position and all duties were transferred to the new acting Commissioner of Narcotics, Harry J. Anslinger.

Secretary of the Board
Portrait	Name	Joined Board	Left Board
	Levi G. Nutt	May 26, 1922	1929
	Harry J. Anslinger	1929	June 14, 1930
Assistant Secretary of the Board
	Manford R. Livingston	?	?
Treasury Secretary - Board Member
	Andrew Mellon	May 26, 1922	June 14, 1930
Secretaries of Commerce - Board Members
	Herbert Hoover	May 26, 1922	August 21, 1928
	William F. Whiting	August 22, 1928	March 4, 1929
	Robert P. Lamont	March 5, 1929	14 June 1930
Secretaries of State - Board Members
	Charles Evans Hughes	May 26, 1922	March 4, 1925
	Frank B. Kellogg	March 5, 1925	March 28, 1929
	Henry L. Stimson	March 28, 1929	June 14, 1930

== Dissolution ==
When the Federal Narcotics Control Board was dissolved, and the Federal Bureau of Narcotics was established a month later, all the duties and responsibilities of the Board were passed to the Commissioner of Narcotics, Harry J. Anslinger.
