= Bureau of Prohibition =

US law enforcement agency (1920–1933)

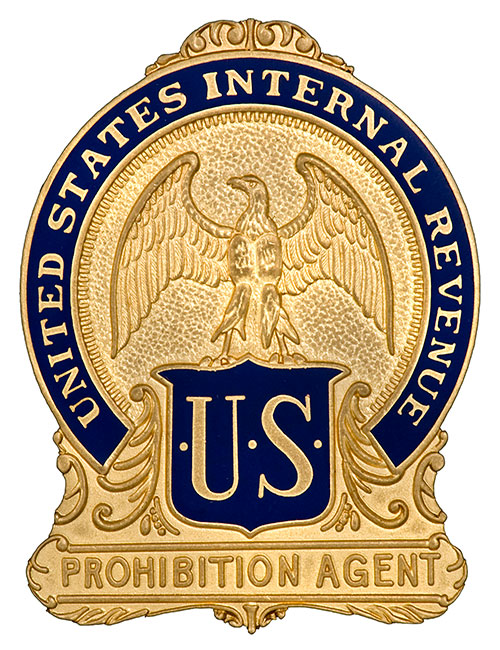

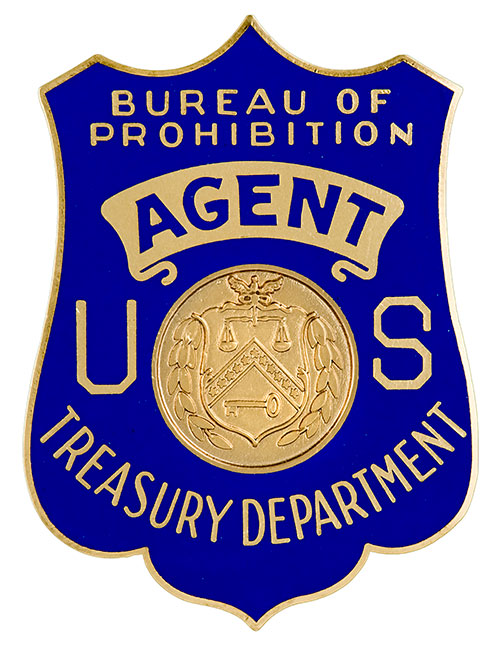

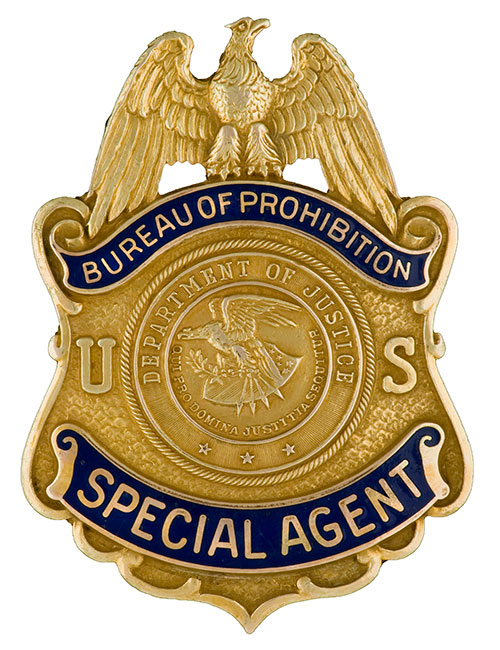

Agency overview
- Formed: January 16, 1920 (Prohibition Unit); 1 July 1930 (Bureau of Prohibition)
- Preceding agency: Agency established
- Dissolved: 1 July 1930 (Prohibition Unit); 2 March 1934 (Bureau of Prohibition)
- Superseding agency: Alcohol Beverage Unit; Alcohol Tax Unit; Bureau of Industrial Alcohol

Jurisdictional structure
- Operations jurisdiction: United States
- Legal jurisdiction: As per operations jurisdiction

Operational structure
- Overseen by: Bureau of Internal Revenue (1920–1929); Department of the Treasury (1929–1933); Bureau of Investigation (1933)
- Headquarters: Washington, D.C.

The Bureau of Prohibition (or Prohibition Unit) was the United States federal law enforcement agency with the responsibility of investigating the possession, distribution, consumption, and trafficking of alcohol and alcoholic beverages in the United States of America during the Prohibition era. The enumerated enforcement powers of this organization were vested in the Volstead Act. Federal prohibition agents of the Bureau were commonly referred to by members of the public and the press of the day as "prohis," or "dry agents." In the sparsely populated areas of the American west, agents were sometimes called "Prohibition Cowboys." At its peak, the bureau employed 2,300 dry agents.

== History ==
=== Volstead Act and formation in the Department of the Treasury ===
==== Prohibition Unit ====
The Prohibition Unit was formed to enforce the National Prohibition Act of 1919 (Volstead Act) which enforced the 18th Amendment to the United States Constitution regarding the prohibition of the manufacture, sale, and transportation of alcoholic beverages. When it was first established in 1920, it was a unit of the Bureau of Internal Revenue. The commissioner of Internal Revenue, Daniel C. Roper, strenuously objected to absorbing the responsibilities of managing a prohibition organization, as he believed they were beyond the scope and mandate of his Bureau which had primarily been responsible for investigating tax violations.

Initially, there were 960 dry agents in the Prohibition Unit.

==== Elevation to Bureau status ====
House Resolution 10729, passed by the 69th Congress, became law on March 3, 1927 and simultaneously created two new bureaus out of Treasury's efforts: the Bureau of Customs and the Bureau of Prohibition. The new bureau would consist of a commissioner of prohibition, an assistant commissioner, two deputy commissioners, a chief clerk, and their staffs. On April 1, 1927, with 10729 becoming effective, the organizational restructuring was officially completed, and prohibition was elevated from Unit status to Bureau status.

=== Transfer to the Department of Justice ===
On July 1, 1930, the Prohibition Bureau was transferred from the Treasury Department to the Department of Justice (DOJ).

=== Mission ===
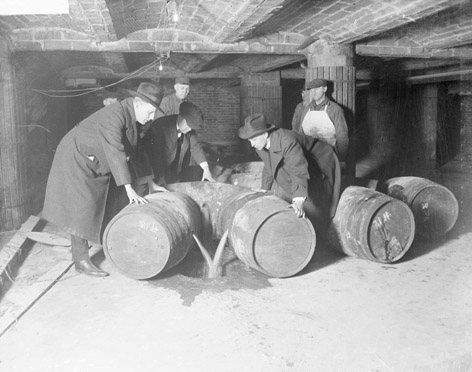
Prohibition agents destroying barrels of alcohol, c. 1921

The Bureau of Prohibition's main function was to stop the sale and consumption of alcohol. Agents would be tasked with eliminating illegal bootlegging rings, and became notorious in cities like New York and Chicago for raiding popular nightclubs.

Agents were often paid low wages, and the Bureau was notorious for allowing many uncertified people to become agents. Doing so strengthened the bureau, as they were able to hire agents in greater numbers.

In 1929, the Increased Penalties Act (Jones Law) increased penalties for violations previously set in the Volstead Act. First time offenders were now expected to serve a maximum of five years and a $10,000 fine as opposed to the previous six months and $1,000 fine. This strengthened animosity toward Prohibition agents, as many of them (such as Major Maurice Campbell, Prohibition administrator of New York City), were already hated for their raids on popular clubs frequented by New York City's elite.

=== Transfer to the Federal Bureau of Investigation ===
Early in 1933, with the repeal of Prohibition imminent, as part of the Omnibus Crime Bill, the Bureau was briefly absorbed into the Bureau of Investigation (BOI). The Prohibition Bureau was demoted from Bureau status to Unit status and became the FBI's Alcohol Beverage Unit (ABU). Though part of the FBI on paper, J. Edgar Hoover, who wanted to avoid liquor enforcement and the taint of corruption that was attached to it, continued to operate it as a separate, autonomous agency in practice.

=== Repeal of Prohibition and dissolution ===
In December 1933, once repeal became a reality and the only federal laws regarding alcoholic beverages were limited to their taxation, the ABU was removed from the FBI and the DOJ and returned to Treasury, where it became the Alcohol Tax Unit, ultimately evolving into the Bureau of Alcohol, Tobacco, and Firearms (ATF).

== Leadership and organization ==
=== Directors of Prohibition, Internal Revenue ===
Prior to the 1st of April 1927, the chief duties for leadership of prohibition enforcement and investigation were vested in the director of the Prohibition Unit.

- James E. Jones
- John H. Kramer

=== Commissioners ===
After April 1927, with the elevation of the Prohibition Unit to the Bureau of Prohibition, the chief administrator of the organization was the commissioner of prohibition.

- Acting Prohibition Commissioner Roy Asa Haynes
- Prohibition Commissioner James M. Doran
- Prohibition Commissioner Henry W. Anderson

=== District headquarters offices ===
In the summer of 1925, the 48 state enforcement districts were abolished and replaced with 22 federal prohibition districts, closely aligned with the federal judicial districts. This number would grow by 1929 to 27 districts.

District Headquarters Offices of the Bureau of Prohibition, circa 1929

Offices not seen above:

- Twenty-Third District, Honolulu, Hawaii
- Twenty-Fourth District, San Juan, Puerto Rico

== Narcotics Division ==
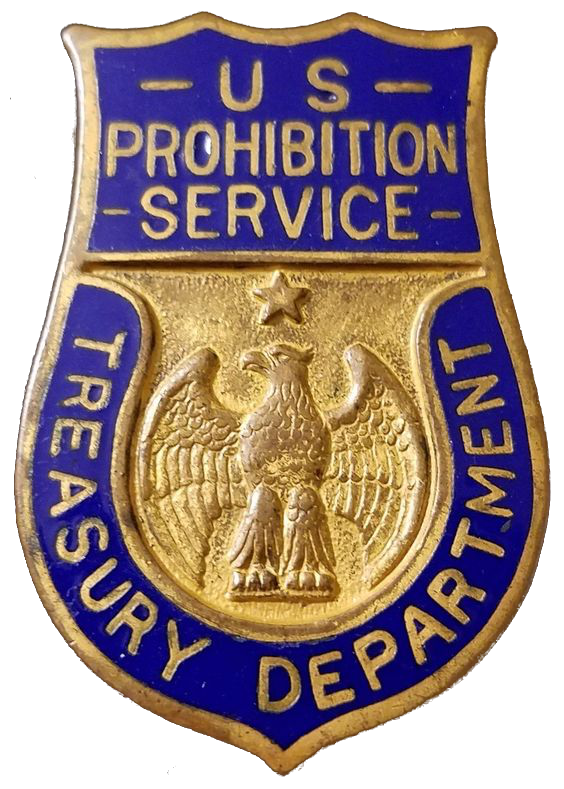
Narcotics agents and inspectors would sometimes be classed as working for the "Prohibition Service"

With the establishment of the Prohibition Unit in 1920, leadership established a Narcotics Division (Note: Not to be confused with the Bureau of Public Health Narcotics Division, whose name was changed to the Division of Mental Hygiene on June 14, 1930, and became the National Institute of Mental Health in 1949. That division primarily focused on addressing addiction for those confined to the "narcotic farms".) with the enumerated powers to investigate all violations of the Harrison Narcotics Tax Act, taking over the duties of investigations and enforcement from the agents of Revenue's Miscellaneous Division. Narcotics Agents and Narcotics Inspectors in these early days primarily were responsible for investigating medical licenses for the distribution of narcotics, but their duties evolved over the course of the decade. Narcotics Agents overall secured more convictions to federal prison for Harrison Act violations than their Dry Agent counterparts did for Volstead Act violations.

In the single fiscal year of 1920, more than half a million dollars were budgeted for narcotics enforcement. The requirements for entry into the Narcotics Division were far more stringent than for their dry agent counterparts; narcotics recruits were required to have an accredited bachelor's degree in pharmacology or medicine.

=== Deputy Commissioner for Narcotics ===
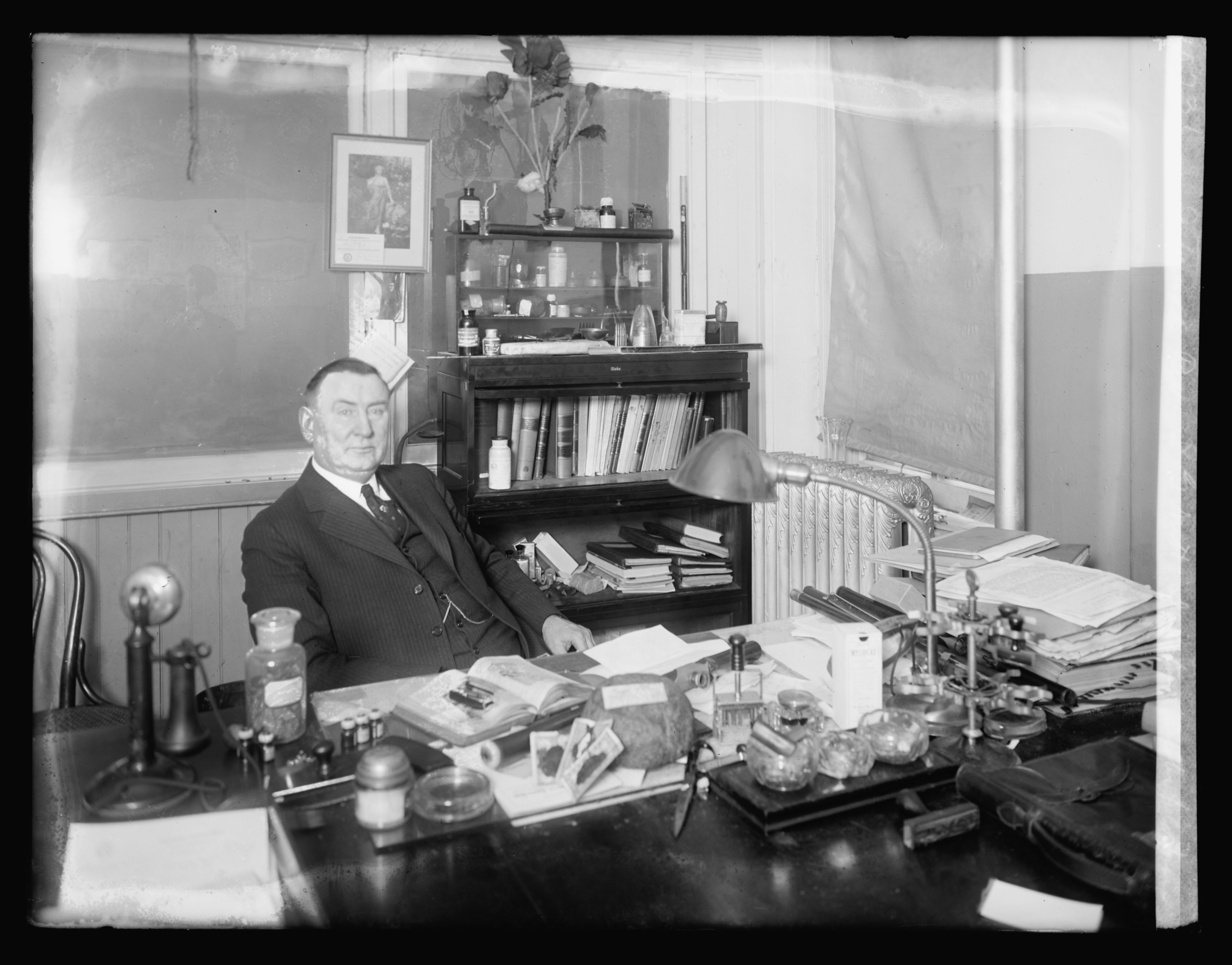
Levi Nutt in his office at the Narcotic Field force at Internal Revenue, around 1920.

Levi Nutt developed the Narcotics Division - sometimes called the Narcotics Field force prior to 1927, and was appointed the position of assistant commissioner for narcotics. His position would absorb the dual capacity as Secretary of the Federal Narcotics Control Board with its establishment in 1922. He was a registered pharmacist, who had worked with Treasury since 1900. He led the division to the arrest of tens of thousands of drug addicts and dealers in the 1920s. After 1927, with the elevation of Prohibition to Bureau status, he was promoted to deputy commissioner for narcotics.

==== Rothstein Scandal ====
Nutt's biological son Rolland Nutt and son-in-law L. P. Mattingly were attorneys for racketeer and gangster Arnold Rothstein in tax matters. After an investigation into the relationship, in 1930 a grand jury found no criminal impairment of Narcotics Division activities, but Nutt lost his position as chief of the Narcotics Division.

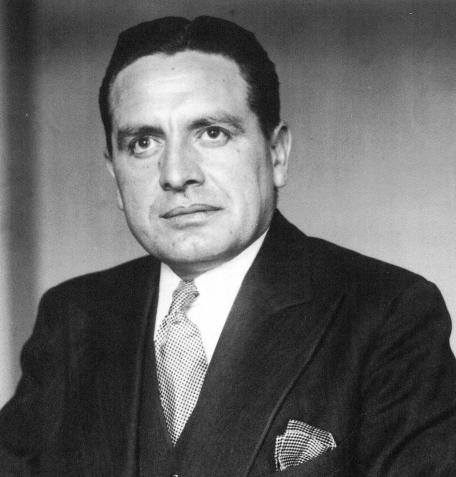
Official Portrait of Harry Anslinger, 1931

==== Anslinger ====
Harry J. Anslinger assumed his duties as the assistant commissioner for narcotics. On July 1, 1930, the Narcotics Division would be merged into the newly established Federal Bureau of Narcotics (FBN) under the leadership of Anslinger, the first United States commissioner of narcotics. Anslinger remained the commissioner of narcotics until his retirement in 1965. The FBN is considered a predecessor to the Drug Enforcement Administration.

=== Prohibition Service fallen officers ===
The first narcotics agent to lose his life in the line of duty was Charles Wood, fatally shot in the back after a two-hour gunfight following a whiskey raid in El Paso, Texas.

Position	Name	Date	Cause of Death
Narcotics Inspector	Charles Archibold "Arch" Wood	March 21, 1921	Gunfire
Narcotics Inspector	Bert S. Gregory	October 25, 1922	Gunfire (Inadvertent)
Narcotics Agent	James T. Williams	October 16, 1924	Gunfire (Inadvertent)
Narcotics Inspector	Louis L. Marks	October 24, 1924	Automobile crash

=== Narcotics Field Divisions ===
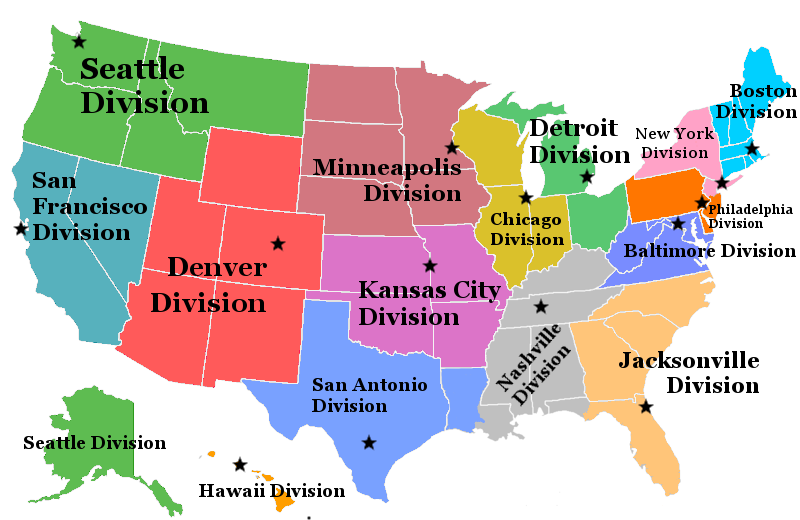
Narcotics Field Divisions and their headquarters, circa 1929.

The Narcotics Division consisted of between 100 - 300 Narcotics Agents and Inspectors based out of 15 Narcotics Field Divisions;

== Industrial Alcohol and Chemical Division ==
In 1925, the Industrial Alcohol and Chemical Division was headed by James M. Doran.

With the Prohibition Reorganization Act of 1930, this division was elevated to bureau status and became the Bureau of Industrial Alcohol.

== Audit Division ==
In 1925, the Audit Division was headed by J.M. Young.

== Famous agents ==
=== The Untouchables ===
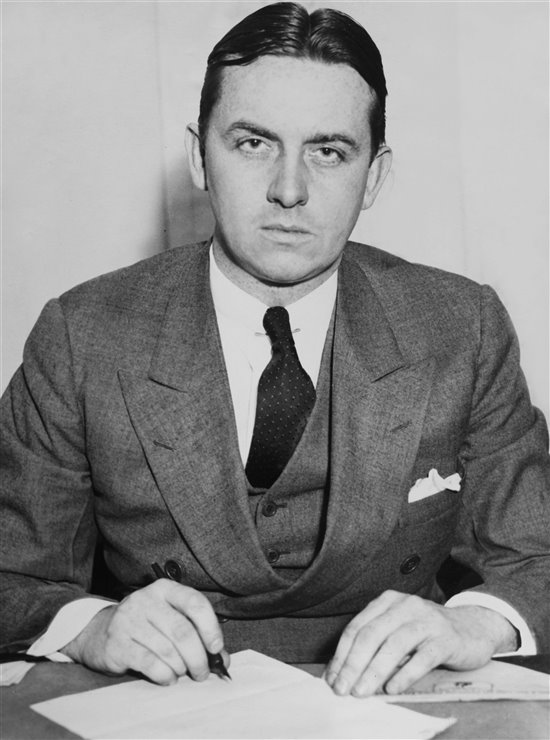
Eliot Ness in 1931

The most famous dry agent of the bureau was undoubtedly the "Untouchable" Eliot Ness. The group of agents that Ness oversaw, "The Untouchables," were by far the most famous group of prohibition agents. Ness was overseen by the northwest district administrator, Malachi Harney, based out of the Chicago Prohibition Office. Their fame resulted from their investigation to capture and arrest the infamous Chicago gangster Al Capone. They earned their nickname after members of the Chicago Outfit repeatedly failed to bribe or intimidate them, proving they were not as easily corrupted as other prohibition agents. Through their efforts, Capone was indicted on 5000 separate counts of conspiracy to violate the National Prohibition Act, though it was ultimately decided not to bring these charges to trial, but rather to concentrate on income tax violations. Nevertheless, the Untouchables gained national acclaim, in particular, Eliot Ness, who ran the group.

=== Georgia Hopley ===
The first female prohibition agent was Georgia Hopley. In early 1922, Hopley was sworn in as a general agent, serving under Federal Prohibition Commissioner Roy A. Haynes. Her appointment made news around the country. Her hiring encouraged local law enforcement agencies to hire more women to investigate women bootleggers.

=== Frank Hamer ===
Frank Hamer was an American lawman and Texas Ranger who led the 1934 posse that tracked down and killed criminals Bonnie Parker and Clyde Barrow. His service in the Bureau of Prohibition was brief but eventful while stationed in El Paso, the scene of countless gunfights during the Prohibition era. He participated in numerous raids and shootouts, and he was involved in a gun battle with smugglers on March 21 which resulted in the death of Prohibition Agent Ernest W. Walker. Hamer transferred to Austin in 1921, where he served as Senior Ranger Captain.

=== Tom Threepersons ===
Tom Threepersons was an American lawman, who claimed to be the son of a Cherokee chief. He is considered to have been one of the last of gunfighters of the Old West. He invented the "Tom Threepersons holster." In 1916, he joined the U.S. Army, and served under General Jack Pershing in pursuit of Pancho Villa in Mexico. He was later assigned to Fort Bliss on the Texas–New Mexico state line. On June 10, 1922, Threepersons was appointed as a Prohibition Agent for El Paso, where he worked for 90 days.

=== Two-Gun Hart ===
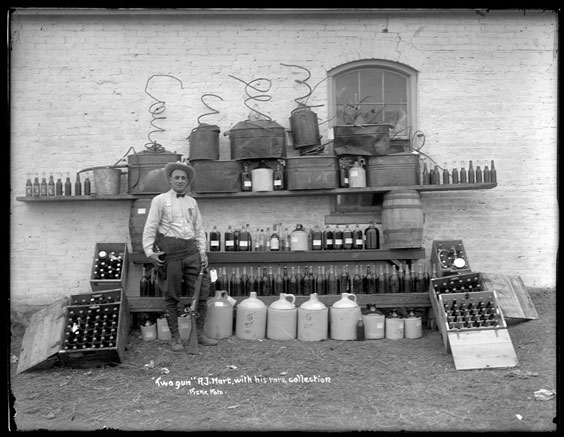
Richard James "Two Gun" Hart (born James Vincenzo Capone) with his collection of confiscated stills, 1926.

Ironically, while Chicago gangster Al Capone was one of the biggest targets of investigation for the dry agents of the Chicago prohibition office and their Untouchables, Capone's eldest biological brother was himself a dry agent, or "prohibition cowboy". Richard James "Two-Gun" Hart, born James Vincenzo Capone, had lost communication with his family at age 16 after fleeing New York City following a gang brawl. Hart kept his familial relationship a secret from most of his coworkers.

=== Izzy and Moe ===
The two-agent team of Isidor "Izzy" Einstein and Moe Smith, working out of the New York City office, compiled the best arrest record in the history of the agency. Izzy and Moe, as they would later be called, had 4,932 arrests while confiscating over five million bottles of alcohol. The duo would disguise themselves as street vendors, fishermen and many other undercover roles. Both investigators were also able to speak multiple languages, and this skill was also helpful when they were working undercover. In late 1925, Izzy and Moe were laid off in a reorganization of the bureau of enforcement. A report in Time magazine suggested they had attracted more publicity than wanted by the new political appointee heading the bureau, although the press and public loved the team.

Other famous lawmen who, at some point, carried a Prohi badge include James L. "Lone Wolf" Asher, Chicagoan Pat Roche, and Hannah Brigham.

== Corruption and public opinion ==
On September 9, 1927, Assistant Treasury Secretary Seymour Lowman issued the following statement to the world's press:

"There are many incompetent, crooked men in the prohibition service. Bribery is rampant, and there are many wolves in sheep's clothing. We are after them. Some days my arm gets tired signing orders of dismissal. I want to say, however, that there are a lot of splendid, fearless men in the service, and, fortunately they greatly outnumber the crooks."

=== Public opinion ===
The major obstacle faced by the Bureau was that the Volstead Act and the Prohibition of alcohol was widely unpopular, controversial, and divisive in American society. In 1929, the number of speakeasies and bars was double the number from before prohibition began.

=== The mob infiltrates the bureau ===
Despite their mandate to stop consumption of alcohol, many prohibition agents reportedly accepted bribes in exchange for ignoring illegal trade in liquor, which has been ascribed, in part, to their relatively low wages. It was rumored that many agents imbibed the alcohol which they were responsible for confiscating. The public perception of Bureau agents was not favorable. Some prohibition agents became notorious for killing innocent civilians and harassing minor bootleggers, while ignoring gangsters and their rich customers.

=== The Ku Klux Klan and Prohibition enforcement ===
Temperance was often used as a smokescreen for many variations of bigotry to include xenophobia, white supremacism, nativism, anti-catholicism, eugenicism, and Manifest destiny. Their perception maintained an observation of the correlation that the target of their bigotry was an alcoholic; that many of the Catholic, Italian, Eastern European, and Irish immigrants to the United States were associated with public drunkenness.

Many of the members of the Anti-Saloon League joined the new Ku Klux Klan with the influx of immigrants to America at the turn of the century, which took a vigilante militia role in prohibition enforcement; they would extrajudicially target those suspected of violating the Volstead Act.

=== Black speakeasies and Prohibition enforcement ===
Certain speakeasies and hooch joints of the prohibition era were owned by black Americans searching for economic stability less than fifty years after the passage of the 15th Amendment, and have been called the birthplace of the jazz age. By the fact of their existence, these speakeasies were defying the law, and formed intimate business relationships with the bootleggers and gangsters that traded in illicit alcohol.

However, many of the leaders of the prohibition movement were also the most prominent voices in black American equality and civil rights. The list of prominent black 'drys' (prohibitionists) includes Frederick Douglass, Martin Delany, Sojourner Truth, F.E.W. Harper, Ida B. Wells, W.E.B. Du Bois, and Booker T. Washington.

This dichotomy created a complex relationship between black Americans and their interpretation of freedom. No matter the relationship between black Americans and prohibition, this complicated the Bureau's ability to enforce the Volstead Act.

== In popular culture ==
- Eliot Ness's memoir, The Untouchables, went on to become a bestseller and was later adapted into two television series (in 1959 and 1993) and a feature film.
- Izzy and Moe, a TV-movie starring Jackie Gleason and Art Carney, was loosely based on the real life Isador Einstein and Moe Smith.
- The Bureau of Prohibition is featured prominently in the HBO period crime series Boardwalk Empire, particularly through the character of Agent Nelson Van Alden.
- Ken Burns and Lynn Novick's documentary "Prohibition - Unintended Consequences" on PBS covers the exploits of the Prohibition Bureau as part of The Prohibition Film Project.

== See also ==
- Drug Enforcement Administration
- Jouett Shouse
- Mabel Walker Willebrandt
- United States House Committee on Alcoholic Liquor Traffic
- William Harvey Thompson
