= Henry Giordano =

American pharmacist, second Commissioner of the Federal Bureau of Narcotics

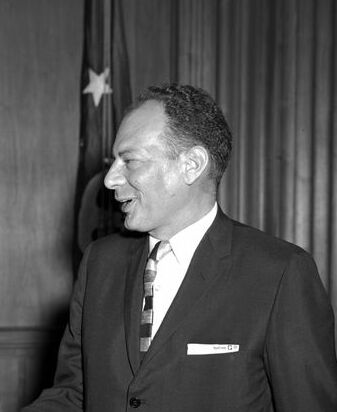
- Giordano in 1962

2nd Commissioner of the Federal Bureau of Narcotics
- In office August 17, 1962 – April 8, 1968
- President: John F. Kennedy; Lyndon B. Johnson
- Preceded by: Harry J. Anslinger
- Succeeded by: John Ingersoll as Director of the Bureau of Narcotics and Dangerous Drugs

Personal details
- Born: June 10, 1914 San Francisco, California, U.S.
- Died: September 19, 2003 (aged 89) Olney, Maryland, U.S.
- Spouse: Elaine Watson
- Children: 2
- Education: University of California, San Francisco

Military service
- Allegiance: United States
- Branch/service: United States Coast Guard
- Years of service: 1943-46
- Rank: Specialist Petty Officer 1st Class
- Unit: Coast Guard Intelligence
- Battles/wars: World War II

Henry Luke Giordano (June 10, 1914 – September 19, 2003) was an American pharmacist and federal agent who served as the second and last Commissioner of the Federal Bureau of Narcotics (FBN), from 1962 to 1968.

== Early life and education ==
Henry Luke Giordano was born on June 10, 1914, in San Francisco. In 1934, he graduated from the UCSF School of Pharmacy with a graduate degree, and then worked as a pharmacist from 1935 to 1941.

== Bureau of Narcotics ==
In 1941, Giordano joined the FBN, where he worked until 1943, at which point he joined the United States Coast Guard.

Released from the Coast Guard in 1946 with a rank of SPX1 (Specialist Petty Officer 1st Class), Giordano returned to the Bureau, where he often worked undercover. He became the deputy commissioner in 1958.

== Commissioner ==
Giordano was sworn in as Commissioner by C. Douglas Dillon, the Secretary of the Treasury, on August 17, 1962, thus officially entering into his duties. He was named as head of the Bureau on July 5, 1962.

Like his predecessor, Harry J. Anslinger, Giordano supported tough penalties for addicts; unlike Anslinger, who led the Bureau for decades, Giordano's term was significantly shorter. In February 1968, President Lyndon B. Johnson requested that the Congress merge the FBN and the Bureau of Drug Abuse Control (BADC).

Both the House and the Senate agreed. The plan took effect in early April, and the Bureau of Narcotics and Dangerous Drugs was thus formed. Giordano was replaced by John Ingersoll, as director of the new bureau, later that year.

Giordano was named Associate Commissioner of the BNDD, until the merger of the BNDD into the new Drug Enforcement Administration (DEA) in 1973.

== Personal life ==
Giordano was married to Elaine Watson, and had two daughters.

== Later life ==
Giordano returned to the pharmaceutical industry; this time working as a consultant in security. He moved to Silver Spring, Maryland; and died in nearby Olney, Maryland in September 2003.

Government offices
Preceded by Harry J. Anslinger	Commissioner of the Federal Bureau of Narcotics; 1962 – 1968	Succeeded by John Ingersoll as Director of BNDD
