= Indian Hemp Drugs Commission =

Indo-British study on cannabis usage

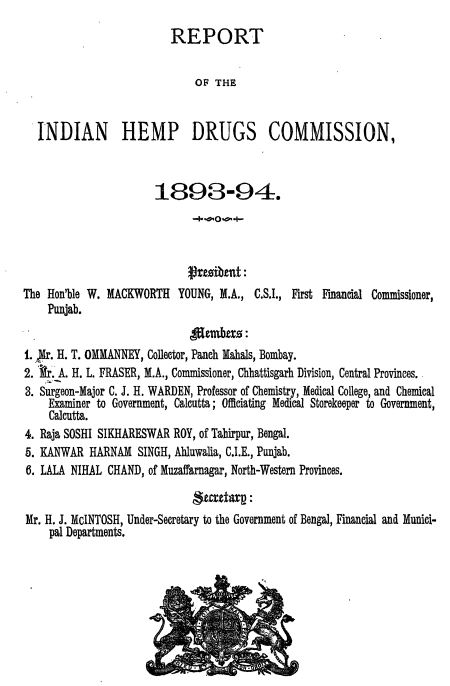

The Indian Hemp Drugs Commission Report, completed in 1894, was an Indo-British study of cannabis usage in British India.

By 2 March 1893, the House of Commons of the United Kingdom was concerned with the effects of hemp drugs in the province of Bengal, India. The Government of India convened a seven-member commission to look into these questions, commencing their study on 3 July 1893. Lord Kimberley suggested modifying the scope of the investigation to be expanded to include all of India.

The report the commission produced was at least 3,281 pages long, with testimony from almost 1,200 "doctors, coolies, yogis, fakirs, heads of lunatic asylums, bhang peasants, tax gatherers, smugglers, army officers, hemp dealers, ganja palace operators and the clergy." A sociological analysis of the report reveals that the commission's visits to asylums all over India helped to undermine the then prevailing belief that consumption of ganja causes insanity.

The president of the commission was Mr. W. Mackworth Young, and other members include H.T. Ommanney, A. H. L. Fraser, Surgeon-Major C.J.H. Warden, Raja Soshi Sikhareshwar Roy, Kanwar Harnam Singh, and Lala Nihal Chand. Serving as secretary was Mr. H.J. McIntosh.

== Conclusions ==
This extensively well-prepared and thorough report summarised the effects (potentially negative) of cannabis in a chapter dedicated to that. Here is the end of that chapter:

The Commission have now examined all the evidence before them regarding the effects attributed to hemp drugs. It will be well to summarize briefly the conclusions to which they come. It has been clearly established that the occasional use of hemp in moderate doses may be beneficial; but this use may be regarded as medicinal in character. It is rather to the popular and common use of the drugs that the Commission will now confine their attention. It is convenient to consider the effects separately as affecting the physical, mental, or moral nature.

=== Physical effects ===
In regard to the physical effects, the Commission have come to the conclusion that the moderate use of hemp drugs is practically attended by no evil results at all. There may be exceptional cases in which, owing to idiosyncrasies of constitution, the drugs in even moderate use may be injurious. There is probably nothing the use of which may not possibly be injurious in cases of exceptional intolerance. There are also many cases where in tracts with a specially malarious climate, or in circumstances of hard work and exposure, the people attribute beneficial effects to the habitual moderate use of these drugs; and there is evidence to show that the popular impression may have some basis in fact. Speaking generally, the Commission are of opinion that the moderate use of hemp drugs appears to cause no appreciable physical injury of any kind. The excessive use does cause injury. As in the case of other intoxicants, excessive use tends to weaken the constitution and to render the consumer more susceptible to disease. In respect to the particular diseases which according to a considerable number of witnesses should be associated directly with hemp drugs, it appears to be reasonably established that the excessive use of these drugs does not cause asthma; that it may indirectly cause dysentery by weakening the constitution as above indicated; and that it may cause bronchitis mainly through the action of the inhaled smoke on the bronchial tubes (1:263-4).

=== Mental effects ===
In respect to the alleged mental effects of the drugs, the Commission have come to the conclusion that the moderate use of hemp drugs produces no injurious effects on the mind. It may indeed be accepted that in the case of specially marked neurotic diathesis, even the moderate use may produce mental injury. For the slightest mental stimulation or excitement may have that effect in such cases. But putting aside these quite exceptional cases, the moderate use of these drugs produces no mental injury. It is otherwise with the excessive use. Excessive use indicates and intensifies mental instability (1:264).

=== Moral effects ===
In regard to the moral effects of the drugs, the Commission are of opinion that their moderate use produces no moral injury whatever. There is no adequate ground for believing that it injuriously affects the character of the consumer. Excessive consumption, on the other hand, both indicates and intensifies moral weakness or depravity (1:264).

=== Discussion ===
Viewing the subject generally, it may be added that the moderate use of these drugs is the rule, and that the excessive use is comparatively exceptional. The moderate use practically produces no ill effects. In all but the most exceptional cases, the injury from habitual moderate use is not appreciable. The excessive use may certainly be accepted as very injurious, though it must be admitted that in many excessive consumers the injury is not clearly marked. The injury done by the excessive use is, however, confined almost exclusively to the consumer himself; the effect on society is rarely appreciable. It has been the most striking feature in this inquiry to find how little the effects of hemp drugs have obtruded themselves on observation. The large number of witnesses of all classes who professed never to have seen these effects, the vague statements made by many who professed to have observed them, the very few witnesses who could so recall a case as to give any definite account of it, and the manner in which a large proportion of these cases broke down on the first attempt to examine them, are facts which combine to show most clearly how little injury society has hitherto sustained from hemp drugs (1:264).

== See also ==
- La Guardia Committee
- National Commission on Marihuana and Drug Abuse
