= John Stearns (physician) =

American physician (1770–1848)

John Stearns (1770 – 1848) was an American medical doctor that served as President of the Medical Society of the State of New York (MSSNY) from 1817 to 1820 and was the founding President of the New York Academy of Medicine (NYAM) in 1847.

== Education and early career ==
John Stearns was born in 1770 to a physician father. He attended Yale College for his undergraduate studies before working as a county doctor's apprentice. He attended the University of Pennsylvania for his medical education. Upon graduating, he moved to the town of Waterford, New York, in 1793, providing rural medicine to Saratoga County's Dutch settlers.

During his early career, he reported on immigrants' usage of ergot fungi to stimulate uterine contractions during childbirth, leading to widespread adoption of the practice. He also provided epidemiological surveillance of croup and influenza in Saratoga County. For this work, he was awarded an honorary Doctor of Medicine by the New York State Board of Regents. His advocacy for the scientific method over empirical evidence led to county-level medical societies for sharing recent medical research and discoveries. When these groups merged into the Medical Society of the State of New York in 1807, Sterns served as its founding secretary until 1814.

After representing the Eastern District in the New York State Senate from 1809 to 1813 as a member of the Federalist Party, Sterns' former patients, prominent New York politicians DeWitt Clinton and Daniel D. Tompkins, convinced him to move his practice from Albany, New York, to New York City.

== Presidencies of MSSNY and NYAM ==
While serving as President of the Medical Society of the State of New York, Stearns made a presentation to the New York State Legislature in 1820 on the mind's effect on bodily diseases. This medical analysis of the mind–body problem recognized that a patient's mental emotions can impact their symptoms after contracting an infectious pathogen, while belief in one's ability to recovery can act as a placebo for faster recovery. In his conclusion, Stearns also reported on the society's support of the US Pharmacopeia, which was founded that year to provide a compendium of all drugs being used in American medicine and standards to confirm their purity.

Stearns' epidemiological studies of 1819-1822 yellow fever epidemic highlighted that New York City's poorest residents were being exposed to unsanitary conditions that allowed the disease to spread, threatening the overall population. This outlook spurred the formation of the New York Academy of Medicine, which continues to focus on public health reform. His 1847 opening address as president of the newly created organization focused on combating quackery in the US healthcare system, such as the increasingly popular pseudoscience of homeopathy, founded by Samuel Hahnemann in 1807. Since 1992, the New York Academy of Medicine has annually awarded the John Stearns Medal for Distinguished Contributions in Clinical Practice in recognition of his service.

== Selected publications ==
- Account of the Pulvis parturiens, a Remedy for Quickening Child-Birth. In: New York Medical Repository, Hexade II, Band V (1808), S. 308–309 (Digitalisat)
- An essay on the bilious epidemic fever, prevailing in the state of New-York : to which are added, a letter from Dr. James Mann, hospital-surgeon; and a dissertation by Dr. John Stearns, delivered before the state medical society, on the same subject; with notes and observations on these productions. H. C. Southwick, Albany 1813 (Digitalisat)
- Philosophy of mind, developing new sources of ideas, designating their distinctive classes, and simplifying the faculties and operations of the whole mind. W. Osborne, New York 1840 (Digitalisat)
