= Levi G. Nutt =

American law enforcement officer

Colonel Levi Nutt
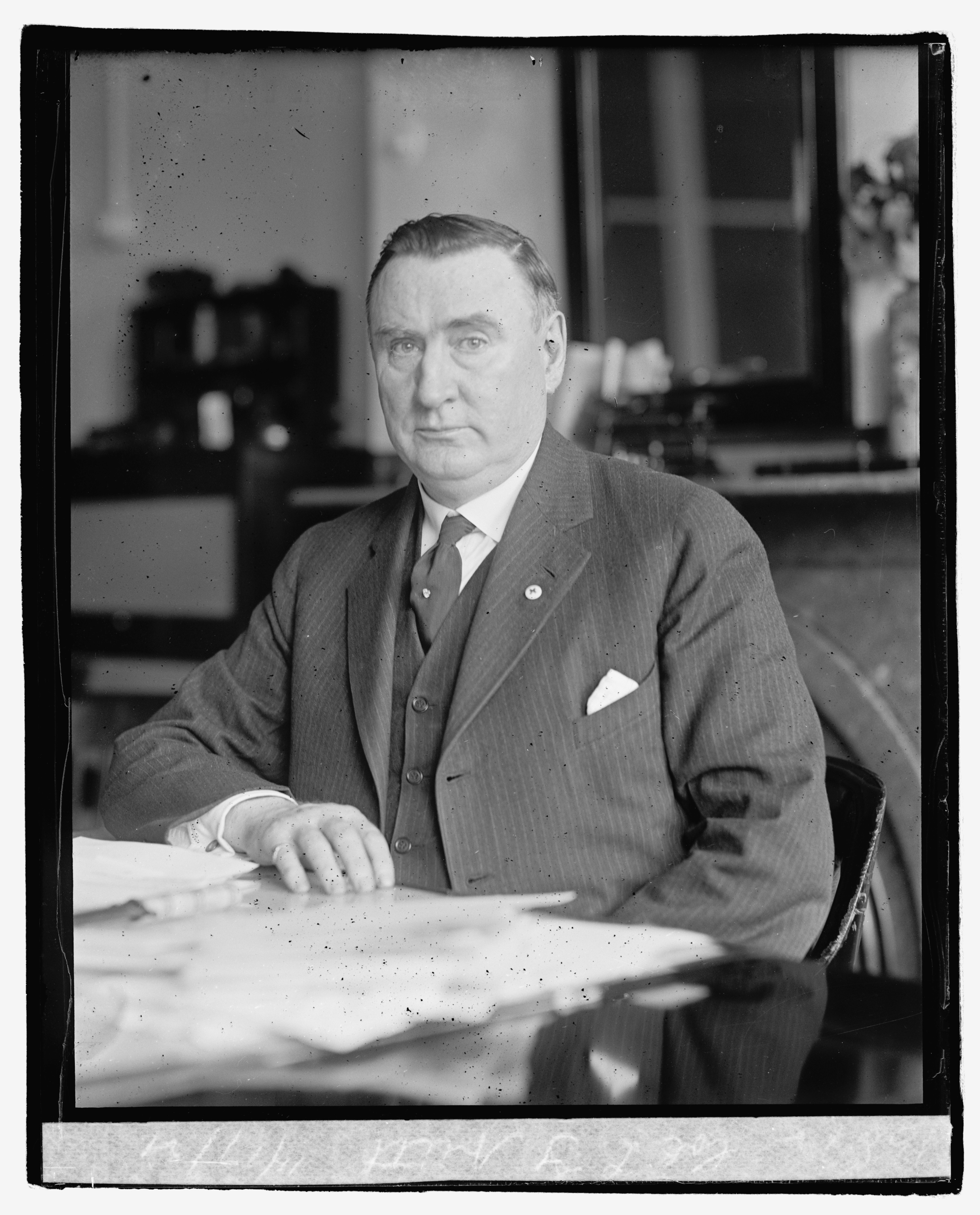

Chief of Internal Revenue Agents
- In office 1917–1920

Deputy Commissioner of Bureau of Prohibition Narcotics Enforcement Division
- In office 1920 – March 1, 1930
- Appointed by: Treasury Secretary Carter Glass
- Preceded by: Hamilton Wright United States Opium Commissioner

Acting Commissioner Federal Bureau of Narcotics
- In office June 14, 1930 – September 1930
- Appointed by: President Herbert Hoover
- Succeeded by: Harry J. Anslinger

Personal details
- Born: December 10, 1865 Buckingham, Illinois
- Died: April 16, 1938 (aged 72) Washington, D.C.
- Resting place: Eldridgeville Cemetery, Illinois
- Spouse: Mary Eulalia (Armitage) Nutt
- Children: Rolland L. Nutt; Edna Lorena Miller; George S. Nutt; Clarence W. Nutt
- Parents: William Nutt; Mary Gamble Nutt
- Nickname: Lefty Nutt

Levi Gamble Nutt was the Chief of the Narcotics Division within the Prohibition Unit of the United States Department of the Treasury from 1919 to 1930, prior to the creation of the Federal Bureau of Narcotics (FBN). He was a registered pharmacist, and led the Division to the arrest of tens of thousands of drug addicts and dealers in the Prohibition era.

== Treasury Agent ==
Nutt joined the Bureau of Internal Revenue in 1900, and rose rapidly through the ranks.

=== The Moonshiner's Skyscraper ===
Prior to popular misconception, moonshining was a crime in many cities of the United States even before the Prohibition Act. The unregulated production of improperly distilled alcohol with too much methanol can cause intense medical problems, blindness, and even death. Moonshiners are also considered in violation of practicing business without a license. The Treasury Department was responsible for ensuring quality control and tax regulation of alcoholic beverages.

In December, 1903, then Revenue Agent Nutt arrived at the location of a skyscraper in the city Chicago, at the corner of State Street and Washington Street. The building was owned by Columbus Laboratories. Nutt, in his official report, noticed "the sign of a distiller and making a mash fit for distillation in a place other than a dully authorized distillery."

On December 23, United States Marshalls arrived at the building, following Nutt's investigation. They arrested five officers and instructors of the Columbus Laboratories, including the prominent United States Commissioner Solomon.

It would later be called "a school wherein pupils were taught to manufacture limitations of various liquors and cocktails."

=== Deputy Commissioner of The Narcotics Division ===
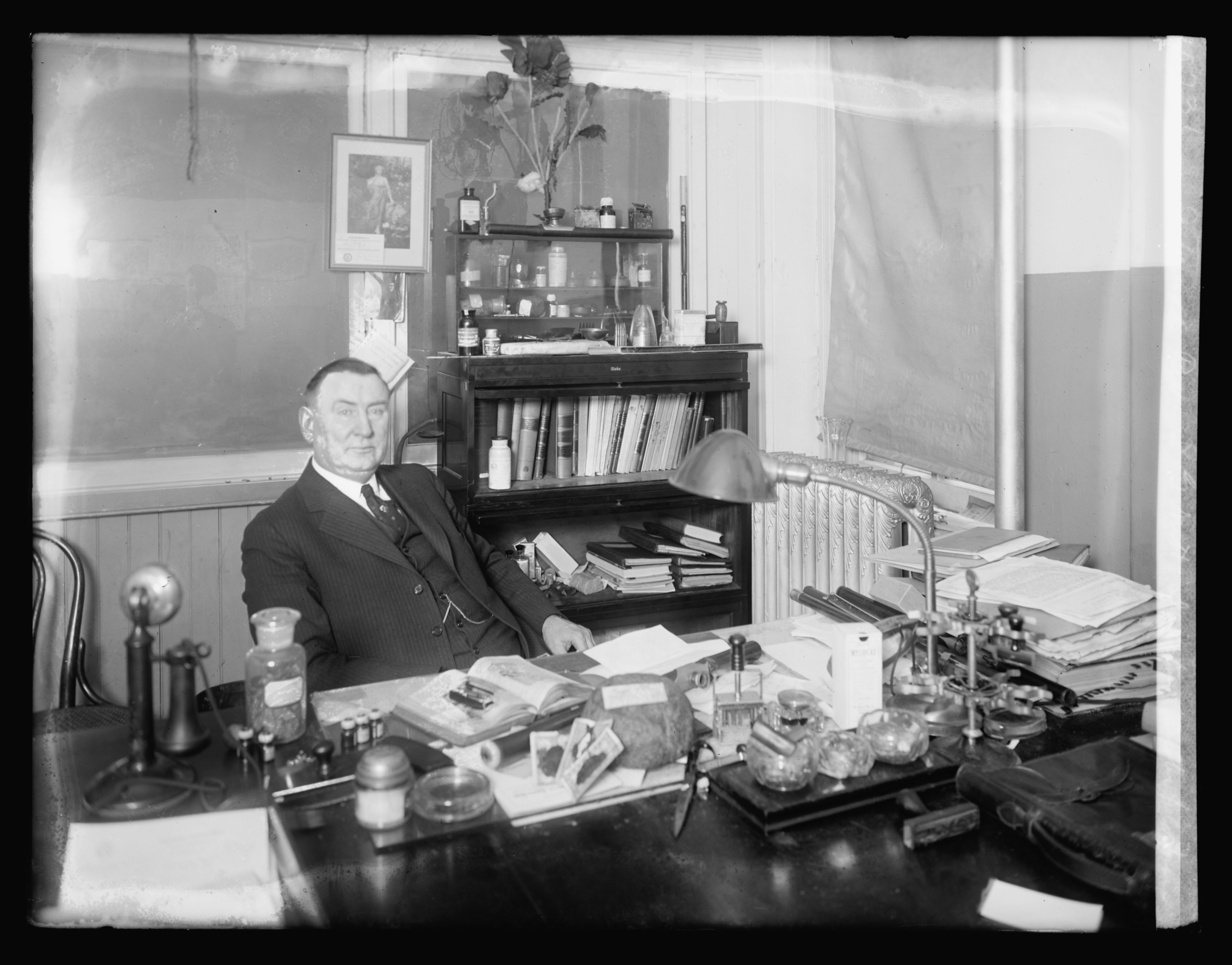
Levi Nutt in his office at the Narcotic Field force at Internal Revenue, around 1920.

With the establishment of the Prohibition Unit in 1920, leadership established a Narcotics Division with the enumerated powers to investigate all violations of the Harrison Narcotics Tax Act, taking over the duties of investigations and enforcement from the narcotics agents of Revenue's Miscellaneous Division. Narcotics Agents and Narcotics Inspectors in these early days primarily were responsible for investigating medical licenses for the distribution of narcotics, but their duties evolved over the course of the decade. Narcotics Agents overall secured more convictions to federal prison for Harrison Act violations than their Dry Agent counterparts did for Volstead Act violations.

Nutt developed this Narcotics Division - sometimes called the Narcotics Field force prior to 1927, and was appointed the position of Assistant Commissioner for Narcotics.

=== The 'Edict of Nutt' ===
Nutt was not known for being friendly to addicts, and refused to differentiate between addicts and any other class of criminal violations of the Harrison Act. Many physicians of the day stressed that he did not understand addiction. These medical assertions are re-stressed by modern historians of medicine. It was and remains the belief of these medically trained doctors that addiction should not be the concern of law enforcement, but for the medical community.

Nutt directed his division to close all addiction clinics they encountered - calling them "dealers" - even though the primary source of all painkilling medication is derived specifically from the opium poppy. The division closed all maintenance clinics except for those administering to the elderly and medically incurable patients near the end of their life. The medical community created the term "The Edict of Nutt," to describe Nutt's notorious practice of closing any medical clinic he deemed to be a dangerous supplier of narcotics.

=== Secretary of Federal Narcotics Control Board ===
His position as the Commissioner of Narcotics would absorb the dual capacity as Secretary of the Federal Narcotics Control Board with its establishment in 1922. Appointed by the members, the Secretary had the vested powers of conducting correspondence on behalf of the board, and signing permits on behalf of the board.

Nutt became the primary federal agent responsible for issuing all import licenses for opium and other drugs in the United States, and controlling the export of the same. At this point, Nutt was the most powerful federal agent responsible for narcotics in the United States.

=== Building the Federal Bureau of Narcotics ===
In June 1930, Nutt was appointed by President Hoover to be the first Commissioner of Narcotics in the newly established Federal Bureau of Narcotics. This organization had been his brainchild alongside Stephen G. Porter.

=== Scandal and removal from office ===
Nutt's son Rolland Nutt and son-in-law Lawrence Mattingly were attorneys for racketeer Arnold Rothstein in tax matters. Mattingly, coincidentally, also interceded with the Treasury on behalf of Al Capone, and the letter that he wrote on Capone's behalf was submitted into evidence during Capone's trial. Another person on Rothstein's payroll was George W. Cunningham, narcotics District Supervisor for New York City.

In 1929, an investigation into the relationship between Nutt and his son's professional work began. In February 1930, after the investigation was concluded, a grand jury found no criminal impairment of Narcotics Division activities, but Nutt lost his position as chief of the Narcotics Division. In March 1930, Nutt was demoted to Field Supervisor. In September, his duties were passed on to Harry J. Anslinger, the future Commissioner of the FBN.

Nutt would assume the leadership of the Alcohol Tax Unit for one year.

Nutt remained in the Department of the Treasury until 1935, when he retired from the federal government.

Nutt died in Washington on 16 April 1938.
