= Miscellaneous Division =

Agency overview
- Formed: 1887

Jurisdictional structure
- Operations jurisdiction: United States

Operational structure
- Parent agency: Department of the Treasury; Bureau of Internal Revenue

The Miscellaneous Division was a division of the Bureau of Internal Revenue, and later the Internal Revenue Service, with the enumerated power to regulate control over all those products of consumption in the United States that were not specifically dedicated to enforcement by any other division or bureau of the United States Department of the Treasury. These miscellaneous products have included; oleomargarine, adulterated butter, filled cheese, mixed flour, cotton futures, playing cards, and narcotics. In internal Treasury documentation, the work of the Miscellaneous Division has often abbreviated as Misc., M. T., or MS.

== First Miscellaneous Division (1887-1906) ==
The first Miscellaneous Division was created in 1887, and it assumed the functions of the Division of Captured Property, Claims, and Lands, and the Mercantile Marine and Internal Revenue Division. In 1906, the Division's main functions were transferred to the Division of Bookkeeping and Warrants, the Office of the Commissioner of Internal Revenue, and the Office of the Chief Clerk.

At some point, the Miscellaneous Division was reestablished within the Bureau of Internal Revenue.

== First narcotics agents in the United States ==
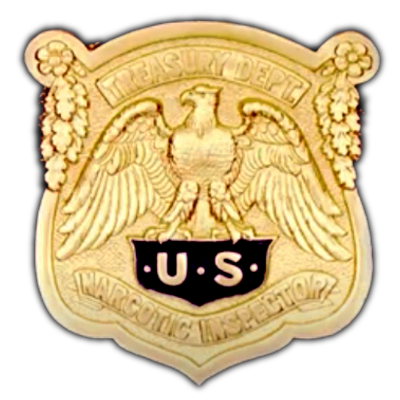
Narcotics Inspector badge, carried by members of the Miscellaneous Division

With the passage of the Harrison Narcotics Tax Act in 1914, the narcotics unit of the Miscellaneous Division became first federal law enforcement agency in the United States dedicated specifically to the investigation of the possession, trafficking, distribution, and consumption of narcotics such as heroin, cocaine and opium.

While the Coast guard and the military were focused specifically on products being introduced into the country from overseas, the narcotics agents of the Miscellaneous Division were vested by the Harrison Act to investigate narcotics within US borders.

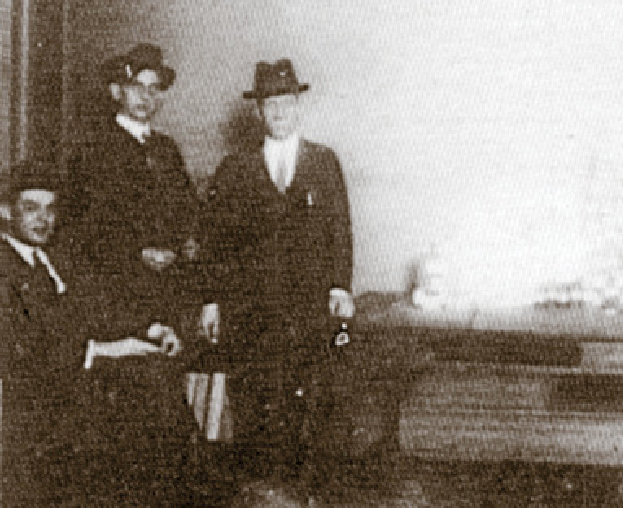
First known photograph of a drug seizure in the United States, featuring three Miscellaneous Division narcotics inspectors and a stash of opium.

The federal "Narcotics Agents" of the Miscellaneous Division, numbering at 160, are considered the first narcotics agents in the United States, and the spiritual fathers of the modern Drug Enforcement Administration.

This division was the primary federal narcotics investigative and enforcement unit in the country until Levi G. Nutt established the Narcotics Division of the Prohibition Unit in 1920, which absorbed these narcotics agents.

== Freed slaves ==
On at least one occasion in 1921, the Miscellaneous Division became the owner of Treasury Department documentation of petitions filed under the Act of April 16, 1862, proving that certain black Americans had petitioned for freedom prior to the 14th Amendment.

== Cold War era ==
By 1947, the Miscellaneous Division was now organized within the Miscellaneous Tax Unit, responsible for the administration of taxes on;

- admissions
- dues
- telephone
- telegraph
- cable facilities
- transportation
- oil pipelines
- safe deposit boxes
- coconut and other vegetable oils
- manufactured sugar
- silver bullion
- hydraulic mining
- coin-operated amusement and gaming devices
- bowling alleys
- billiard and pool tables
- documentary stamp taxes
- oleomargarine
- narcotics
- firearms

And the adjustment of claims for refund of taxes paid under the Agricultural Adjustment Act and related legislation.
