= Federal Bureau of Narcotics =

Defunct agency of the US Department of the Treasury

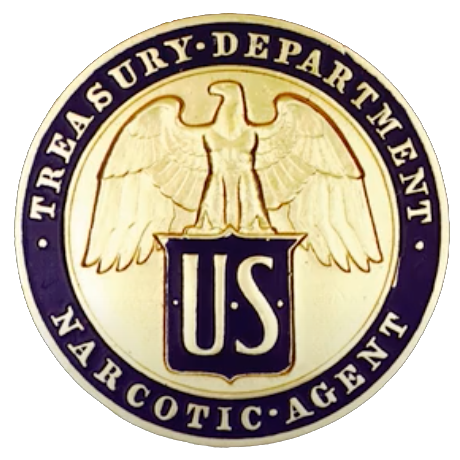
- First metal stamp of the FBN

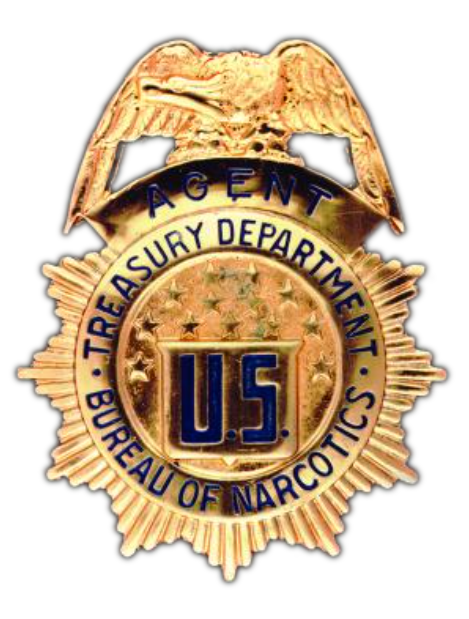
- Badge carried by Special Agents

Agency overview
- Formed: June 14, 1930; 96 years ago
- Preceding agencies: Federal Narcotics Control Board; Narcotics Division
- Dissolved: 1968
- Superseding agencies: Bureau of Narcotics and Dangerous Drugs; Bureau of Alcohol, Tobacco, Firearms and Explosives; Drug Enforcement Administration
- Jurisdiction: U.S. Government
- Headquarters: Washington, D.C.
- Agency executives: Levi G. Nutt, Acting Commissioner, 1930-1930; Harry J. Anslinger, Commissioner, 1930-1962; Henry Giordano, Commissioner, 1962-1968; Malachi Harney, Assistant Commissioner, 1936-1956
- Parent agency: Department of the Treasury

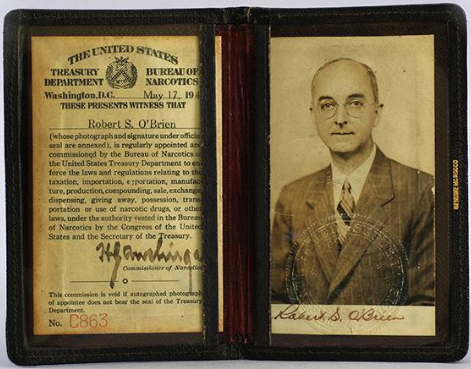
Credential used by FBN special agent Robert S. O'Brien

The Federal Bureau of Narcotics (FBN) was an agency of the United States Department of the Treasury, with the enumerated powers of pursuing crimes related to the possession, distribution, and trafficking of listed narcotics including cannabis, opium, cocaine, and their derivatives. Headquartered in Washington, D.C., the FBN carried out operations and missions around the world. The bureau was in existence from its establishment in 1930 until its dissolution in 1968. FBN is considered a predecessor to the Drug Enforcement Administration.

== History ==
The FBN was established on June 14, 1930, consolidating the functions of the Federal Narcotics Control Board and the Bureau of Prohibition (BOI) Narcotic Division. These preceding bureaus were established to assume enforcement responsibilities assigned to the Harrison Narcotics Tax Act of 1914 and the Jones–Miller Narcotic Drugs Import and Export Act of 1922.

=== Levi Nutt ===
The FBN was the brainchild of Colonel Levi G. Nutt, who had for two decades been the head of the Bureau of Prohibition Narcotics Division. In June 1930, Nutt was appointed by President Hoover to be the first Commissioner of Narcotics. He was a registered pharmacist, and led the Division to the arrest of tens of thousands of drug addicts and dealers in the Prohibition era. However, Nutt was hit with a scandal that rocked him. In February 1930, after the investigation was concluded, a grand jury found no criminal impairment of Narcotics Division activities, but the flak was too much for the government. In March 1930, Nutt was demoted to Field Supervisor. In September, his duties were passed on to Harry J. Anslinger, the future Commissioner of the FBN.

=== Fallen Officers ===
1. Special Agent Mansel Ross Burrell. December 19, 1967. Gunfire.
2. Special Agent Wilson Michael Shee. December 12, 1957. Gunfire
3. District Supervisor Anker Marius Bangs. September 24, 1950. Gunfire.
4. Agent Andrew P. Sanderson. September 23, 1944. Automobile crash.
5. Inspector Spencer Stafford. Thursday, February 7, 1935. Gunfire.
6. Agent John W. Crozier. November 16, 1934. Automobile crash.

=== Harry Anslinger ===
Harry J. Anslinger was the "personification of the antinarcotic regime," and ran the bureau for the majority of its existence. He had been the Assistant Commissioner of the Bureau of Prohibition and took over the Bureau's Narcotic Division in 1929.

With the establishment of the FBN a year later, Anslinger was appointed the first Narcotics Commissioner of the United States by Treasury Secretary Andrew Mellon.

Under Anslinger, the FBN lobbied for harsh penalties for drug usage. He had little regard for addicts, saying once: "The best cure for addiction? Never let it happen." This problematic slogan is similar to the phrase "just say no." He is also quoted as saying: "We intend to get the killer-pushers and their willing customers out of selling and buying drugs... The answer to the problem is simple—get rid of drugs, pushers and users. Period."

This approach treated all users equally, and did not differentiate casual usage from clinically defined addiction. According to Anslinger, all usage of narcotics was a criminal act.

=== The Drug War ===
The FBN is credited for criminalizing drugs such as marijuana with the Marijuana Tax Act of 1937, as well as strengthening the Harrison Narcotics Tax Act of 1914. Even so, the main focus of the FBN was fighting opium and heroin smuggling. One instance against opium was the Opium Poppy Control Act of 1942.

Malachi Harney, Assistant Commissioner of the FBN, wrote in an article for the University of California Press on the enumerated powers of the agency:

"It should be borne in mind that the Bureau are confined to a rather narrow range of specifically enumerated drugs. These are opium... alkaloids and derivatives of opium (including such products as morphine, heroin, codine, dilaudid), and semisynthetic derivatives of opium... wholly synthetic substances... opiates... the coca leaf and its derivatives (cocaine)... marihuana... cannabis... The Federal Bureau of Narcotics does not have responsibilities in connection with many other chemicals generally described as dangerous drugs such as... barbiturates, amphetamines, tranquilizers... hallucinogens..."

In this article, Harney defined marijuana as being the ground substance of the plant called cannabis. Marijuana was not originally intended by the agency as a word to refer to the cannabis plant.

=== Billie Holiday ===
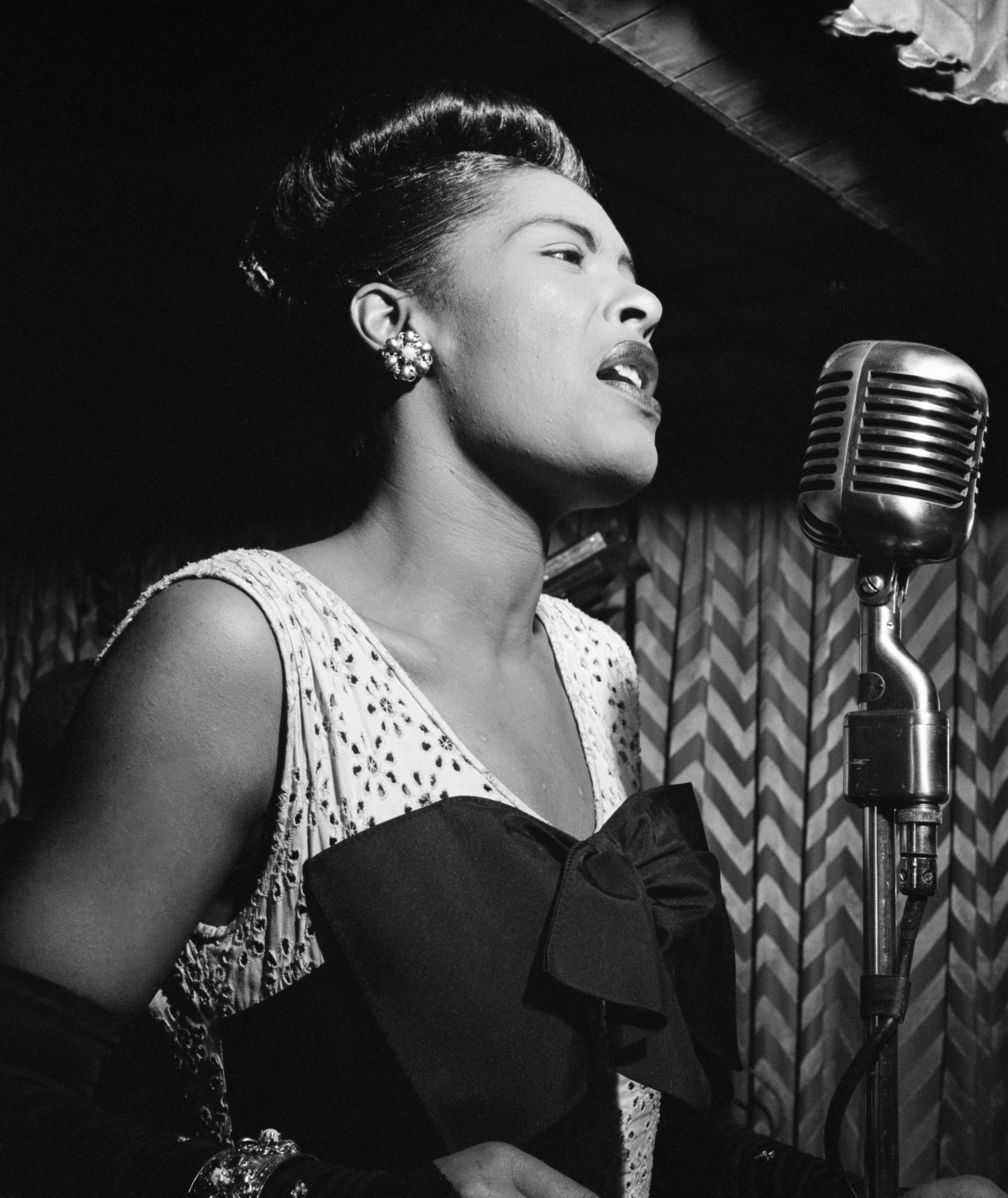
Billie Holiday singing in 1947

FBN Special Agent George Hunter White arrested jazz singer Billie Holiday at the Mark Twin Hotel in San Francisco. At a conference of the DEA in 2014, historian John C. McWilliams presented the evidence that White consumed most of the narcotics he was pursuing. He was most likely high when he arrested Holiday for possession.

Years later, in 1959, Holiday died in police custody, handcuffed to a hospital bed and surrounded by FBN agents. The agents did not allow her to see family or friends, and denied her doctors from administering methodone.

=== World War II and the OSS ===
When World War II broke out in Europe in 1939, William J. Donovan, Millard Preston Goodfellow, and David K. E. Bruce requested a list of names from Commissioner Anslinger to use in the effort against the Axis powers in their new wartime intelligence agency - what was at that time called the Office of the Coordinator of Information (COI), the direct precursor to the Office of Strategic Services (OSS), and what would eventually become the Central Intelligence Agency (CIA).

FBN special agents that were loaned to special duty at COI/OSS include George Hunter White and Garland H. Williams, among others. These men were sent to attend training at a British Special Operations Executive training camp outside of Toronto, Canada, called Camp X. White is quoted as calling this the "school of mayhem and murder."

In the Spring of that year, White became one of the cadre of instructors at the COI schoolhouses in Washington, D.C. under the command of his FBN Supervisor and COI Training Director Garland H. Williams, where he taught counterintelligence to hundreds of would-be and hopeful undercover operatives and guerrilla warfighters. Those operatives and operators who were successful were then deployed all around the world to fight the Axis powers.

Another effort that OSS and the FBN undertook during the war was the pursuit of the Nazi "truth drug," or "T drug," and the two agencies collaborated in experiments on unwitting American citizens to see the effects of certain narcotics. These experiments primarily targeted gangsters, pimps, prostitutes, and other "undesirable" classes of American citizens. FBN agents would dose their targets with narcotics against their knowledge, and document what would happen over the course of several months to years. These experiments would eventually become a part of Operation Midnight Climax, part of the umbrella MKUltra program, managed by FBN special agent George Hunter White and CIA chemist Sidney Gottlieb. These experiments lasted into the 1960s, and are allegedly responsible for the death of Frank Olson.

=== The French Connection ===
In 1934, an FBN field report indicated that heroin in New York was being distributed from Corsica. The "connection" refers to the relationship between the Corsican Brotherhood and the Sicilian Mafia. The FBN was the major American federal law enforcement agency responsible for uncovering the networks of the French Connection.

By the 1950s and 1960s, over 80 percent of all heroin consumed in the United States was originated in Southern France, distributed by the Unione Corse. These drugs were shipped to the USA through Cuba. FBN agents were routinely sent to Cuba during the 50s, and FBN undercover operative Jacques Voignier was stationed in Cuba with the dual assignment to gather information for the CIA on an unknown Cuban operator named Fidel Castro.

=== Lucky Luciano ===
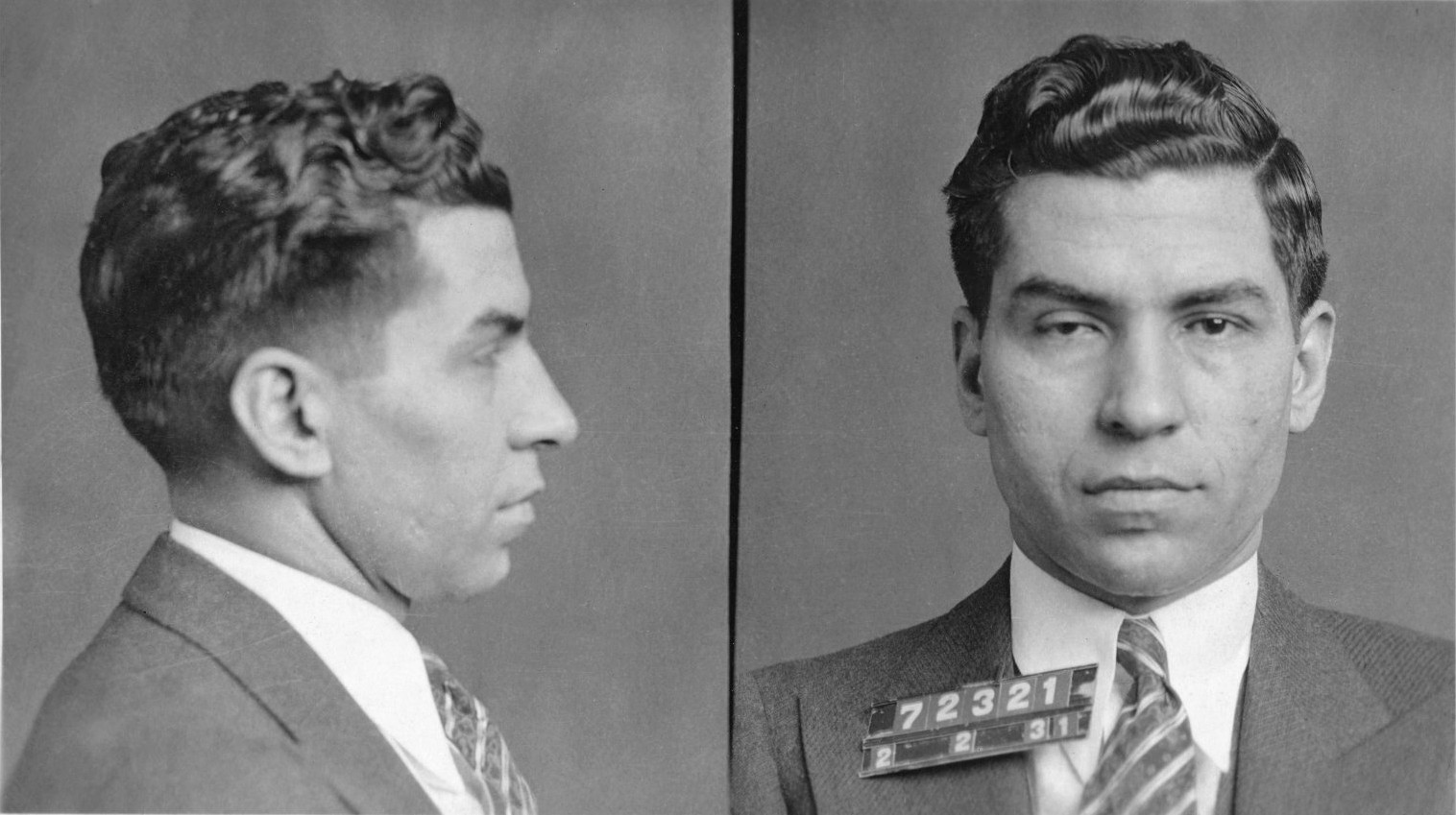
Lucky Luciano mugshot

FBN agents immediately resumed to full-time status at the end of the war, and Anslinger gave Garland H. Williams and George Hunter White the assignment to track down and bring to justice Lucky Luciano - the Italian Chicago mob boss that the OSS and the Office of Naval Intelligence (ONI) had heavily depended on to guarantee safety of shipbuilding in Chicago and New York. ONI and OSS during the war had also used Luciano as an asset to ensure protection of American forces by the Italian criminal underworld as they invaded the country and advanced northward against the Germans.

Lucky Luciano had still been running his mob from behind bars, but the US granted him reduced sentence in 1945 for "wartime services to the country." Williams charged that three months after Luciano's return [to Italy] from Cuba in 1947, the first large shipment of heroin, worth $250,000, was smuggled into the United States. -- The Luciano Story

In 1950, special agent Charles Siragusa was assigned to take over the hunt for Luciano from White and Williams. The hunt for Luciano would dominate the next decade of his life. On one particular occasion, Luciano was asked by a group of reporters what he would like for Christmas. His response was "Siragusa in a ton of cement!" Luciano died in Naples from a heart attack before Siragusa could bring a case against him. Siragusa later starred as himself in the 1973 film Lucky Luciano.

=== Overseas offices ===
The FBN over time established several offices overseas in;

- France
- Italy
- Turkey
- Beirut
- Thailand

Other hotspots of international narcotics smuggling also maintained offices.

These internationally deployed special agents (never totaling more than 17 at one time) cooperated with local drug enforcement agencies in gathering intelligence on smugglers and also made undercover busts locally.

=== Vietnam War ===
The work against heroin and opium was however hamstrung by US foreign policy considerations: during the Vietnam War for instance great importance was placed on investigating minor Vietnamese smugglers that could be connected to the resistance while investigations of large scale smugglers from the US ally Thailand were left unfinished.

=== Dissolution ===
Anslinger retired in 1962 and was succeeded by Henry Giordano, who was the commissioner of the FBN until it was merged in 1968 with the Bureau of Drug Abuse Control, an agency of the Food and Drug Administration (FDA), to form the Bureau of Narcotics and Dangerous Drugs, an agency of the United States Department of Justice and a predecessor agency of the current Drug Enforcement Administration, which was established in 1973.

== Legal disputes ==
In Bivens v. Six Unknown Named Agents, the FBN was sued for violating the 4th Amendment rights of Bivens, through the illegal search and seizure of drugs without a warrant.

== See also ==
- Sherman v. United States: A U.S. Supreme Court case involving the Bureau.
- List of United States federal law enforcement agencies
- Garland H. Williams
- George Hunter White
- Charlie Siragusa
- Jacques Voignier
- Malachi Harney
