= Harry J. Anslinger =

1st Commissioner of the Federal Bureau of Narcotics (1892–1975)

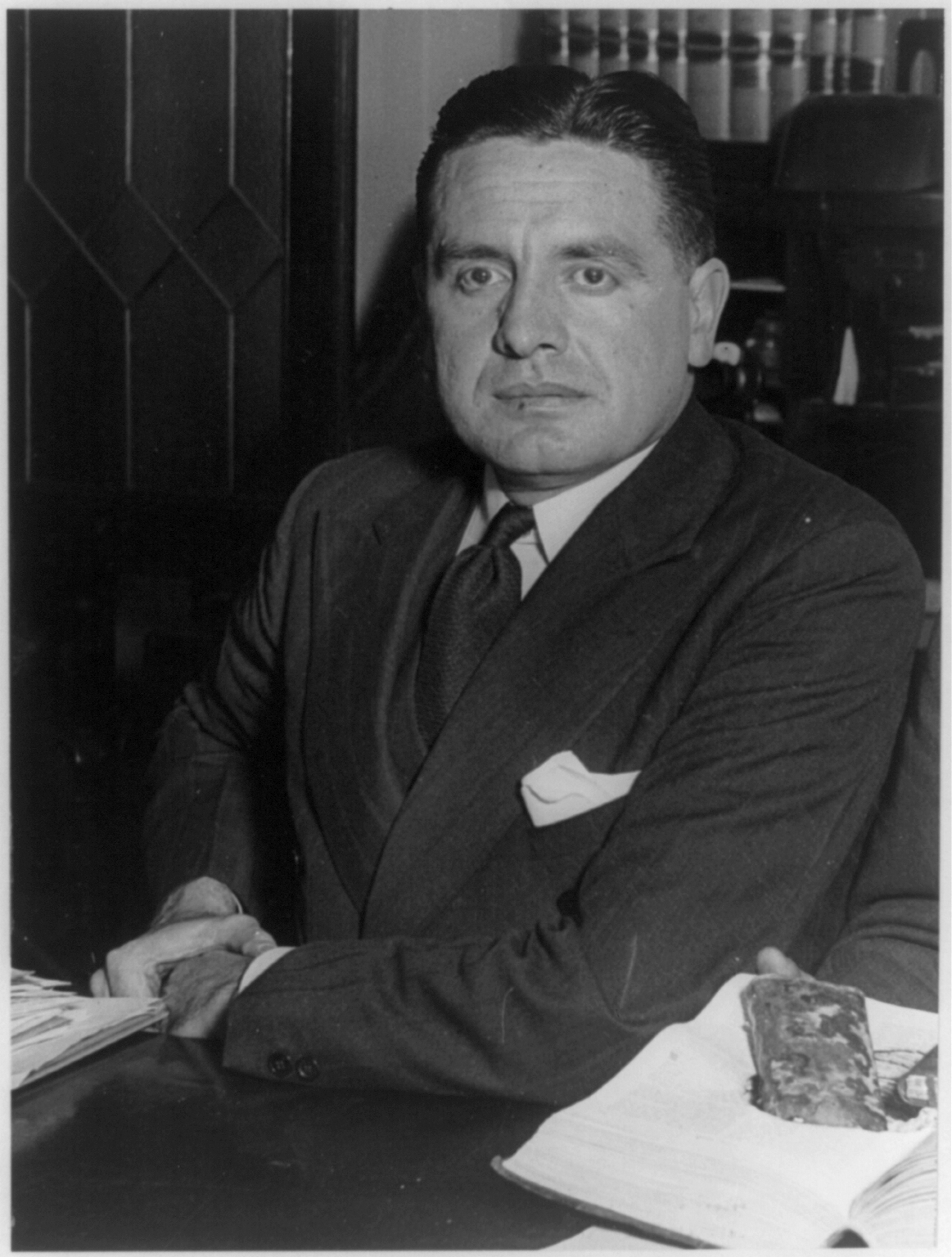
- Anslinger in 1930

1st Commissioner of the Federal Bureau of Narcotics
- In office August 12, 1930 – August 17, 1962
- President: Herbert Hoover; Franklin D. Roosevelt; Harry S. Truman; Dwight D. Eisenhower; John F. Kennedy
- Preceded by: Acting Commissioner Levi G. Nutt
- Succeeded by: Henry Giordano

Personal details
- Born: Harry Jacob Anslinger; May 20, 1892 Altoona, Pennsylvania, U.S.
- Died: November 14, 1975 (aged 83) Altoona, Pennsylvania, U.S.
- Party: Democratic
- Spouse: Martha Kind Denniston
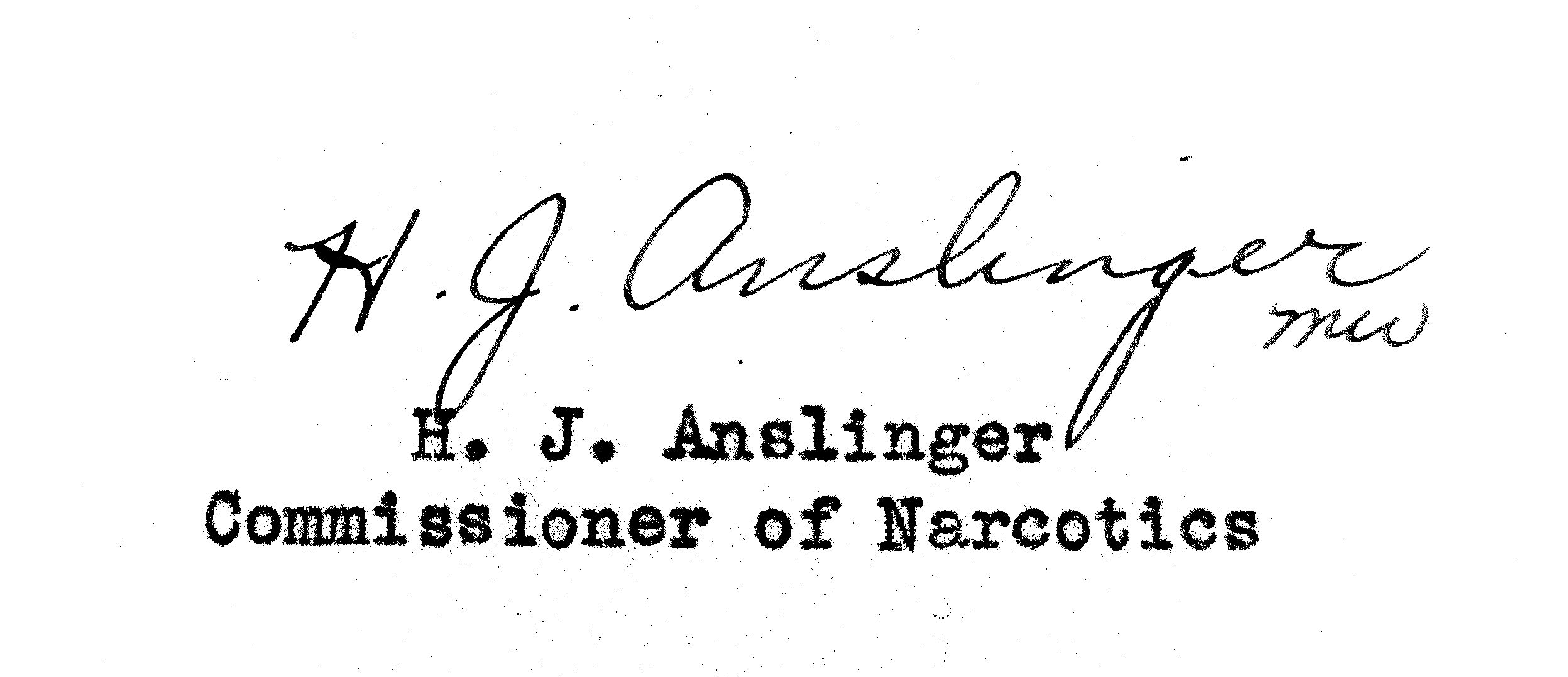
- Signature

Harry Jacob Anslinger (May 20, 1892 – November 14, 1975) was an American government official who served as the first commissioner of the U.S. Treasury Department's Federal Bureau of Narcotics during the presidencies of Herbert Hoover, Franklin D. Roosevelt, Harry S. Truman, Dwight D. Eisenhower, and John F. Kennedy. He was a supporter of Prohibition, and of the criminalization of all drugs except for alcohol, spearheading anti-drug policy campaigns. Anslinger has been characterized as an early proponent of the war on drugs, as he zealously advocated for and pursued harsh drug penalties, cannabis in particular.

Anslinger held office as commissioner for an unprecedented 32 years, until 1962. He then held office for two years as U.S. Representative to the United Nations Narcotics Commission. The responsibilities once held by Anslinger are now largely under the jurisdiction of the U.S. Office of National Drug Control Policy and the agency he ran was a predecessor of the Drug Enforcement Administration (DEA).

== Early life ==
Anslinger was born in Altoona, Pennsylvania, in 1892. His father, of Swiss German origin, was Robert J. Anslinger, a barber by trade, who was born in Bern, Switzerland. His mother, Rosa Christiana Fladt, was born in the Grand Duchy of Baden (today a part of Germany). The family emigrated to the United States in 1881. Robert Anslinger worked in New York for two years, then moved to Altoona, a town founded by the Pennsylvania Railroad. In 1892, the year Harry was born, Robert Anslinger went to work for the Pennsylvania Railroad, seeking more stable employment.

Harry Anslinger followed his father in going to work for the Pennsylvania Railroad. After completing the eighth grade, he began to work with his father at the railroad, while starting with his freshman year. Aged 14, he continued to attend morning sessions in the local high school, working afternoons and evenings for the railroad. Failing to receive a high school diploma, Harry enrolled at Altoona Business College in 1909 at the age of 17, and for the next two years received additional tutoring. In 1912, he was granted a furlough permitting him to enroll at Pennsylvania State College, where he studied in a two-year associate degree program in business and engineering while working during weekends and vacation periods.

== Rise to prominence ==
Anslinger gained attention early in his career. At the age of 23 (in 1915), while working as an investigator for the Pennsylvania Railroad, he performed a detailed investigation that found the $50,000 claim of a widower in a railroad accident to be fraudulent. He saved the company the payout and was promoted to captain of railroad police.

From 1917 to 1928, Anslinger worked for various military and police organizations on stopping international drug trafficking. His duties took him all over the world, from Germany to Venezuela to Japan. He is credited with shaping not only America's domestic and international drug policies but influencing drug policies of other nations, particularly those that had not debated the issues internally.

By 1929, Anslinger returned from his international tour to absorb the duties of Levi G. Nutt as assistant commissioner for the Narcotics Division of the Bureau of Prohibition. At that time, corruption and scandal gripped prohibition and narcotics agencies, and Nutt was caught in the scandal surrounding the business relationship of his son to gangster and bootlegger Arnold Rothstein. The ensuing shake-ups and re-organizations set the stage for Anslinger, perceived as an honest and incorruptible figure, to advance not only in rank but in political stature. Anslinger also assumed all the duties of Nutt's role as Secretary of the Federal Narcotics Control Board, which was dissolved less than a year later in June 1930.

In 1930, at age 38, Anslinger was appointed as the founding commissioner of the Treasury's Federal Bureau of Narcotics. Appointed by department Secretary Andrew W. Mellon, Anslinger was given a budget of $100,000 and wide scope.

== Campaign against cannabis (1930–1937) ==
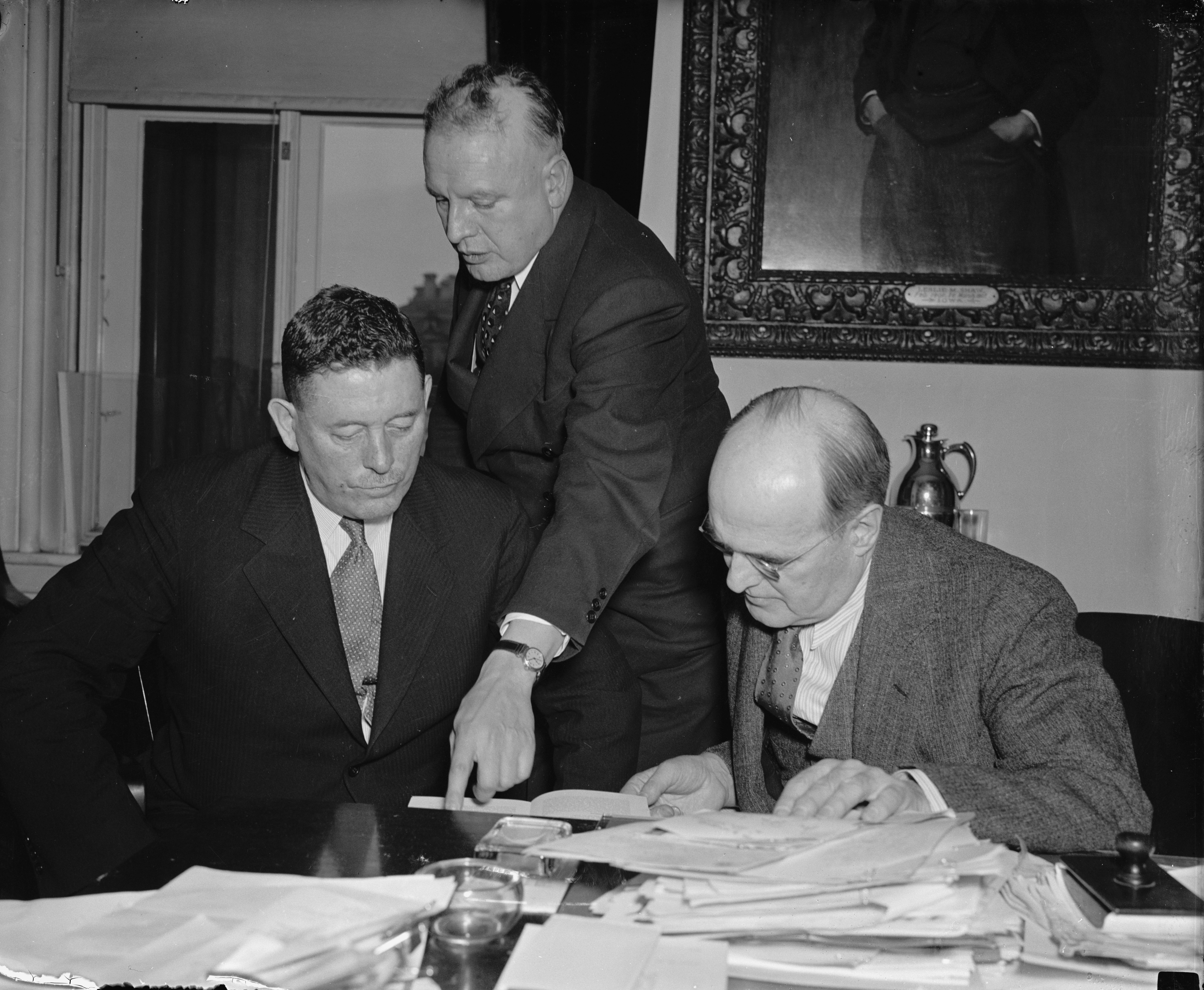
Anslinger (center) discussing cannabis control with Canadian narcotics chief Charles Henry Ludovic Sharman and Assistant Secretary of the Treasury Stephen B. Gibbons (1938)

Restrictions on cannabis (cannabis sativa, often called "Indian Hemp" in documents before the 1940s) as a drug started in local laws in New York in 1860. That was followed by local laws in many other states, and by state laws in the 1910s and 1920s.| The federal Pure Food and Drug Act of 1906 regulated the labeling of patent medicines that contained "cannabis indica". In 1925, in the Second International Opium Convention, the United States supported regulation of "Indian hemp" in its use as a drug. Recommendations from the International Opium Convention inspired the work with the Uniform State Narcotic Act between 1925 and 1932.

Anslinger had not been active in that process until approximately 1930. Anslinger collected stories of cannabis causing crime and violence, and ignored evidence that allowed for other interpretations. Doctor Walter Bromberg pointed out that substance abuse and crime are heavily confounded and that none of a group of 2,216 criminal convictions he had examined was clearly connected to cannabis's influence. He also ignored a discussion forwarded to him by the American Medical Association, in which 29 of 30 pharmacists and drug industry representatives objected to his proposals to ban cannabis. One such statement claimed that the proposal was "Absolute rot. It is not necessary. I have never known of its misuse.". However, only the single dissenter (who noted he had once encountered a doctor who had been addicted to cannabis) was preserved in Bureau files.

As head of the Federal Bureau of Narcotics, Anslinger sought, and ultimately received, an increase of reports about smoking of cannabis in 1936 that continued to spread at an accelerated pace in 1937. Before that, the smoking of cannabis had been relatively slight and confined to the Southwest, particularly along the Mexican border.

=== Promotion of cannabis as public harm ===
The Bureau first prepared a legislative plan to seek a new law from Congress that would place cannabis and its distribution directly under federal control. Second, Anslinger ran a campaign against cannabis on radio and at major forums. His views were zealous and ideological:

By the tons it is coming into this country — the deadly, dreadful poison that racks and tears not only the body, but the very heart and soul of every human being who once becomes a slave to it in any of its cruel and devastating forms. ... Marihuana is a short cut to the insane asylum. Smoke marihuana cigarettes for a month and what was once your brain will be nothing but a storehouse of horrid specters. Hasheesh makes a murderer who kills for the love of killing out of the mildest mannered man who ever laughed at the idea that any habit could ever get him. ...

By using the mass media with support from publisher William Randolph Hearst, Anslinger propelled the anti-cannabis sentiment from state level to a national movement. He used what he called his "Gore Files" - a collection of quotes from police reports - to graphically depict offenses caused by drug users. His most infamous story in The American Magazine concerned Victor Licata, who killed his family:

An entire family was murdered by a youthful addict in Florida. When officers arrived at the home, they found the youth staggering about in a human slaughterhouse. With an axe he had killed his father, mother, two brothers, and a sister. He seemed to be in a daze ... He had no recollection of having committed the multiple crimes. The officers knew him ordinarily as a sane, rather quiet young man; now he was pitifully crazed. They sought the reason. The boy said that he had been in the habit of smoking something which youthful friends called "muggles," a childish name for marijuana.

This story was referenced in the 1937 anti-weed film Reefer Madness. It is one of 200 violent crimes which were documented in Anslinger's "Gore Files" series. It has since been discovered that Licata murdered his family due to severe mental illness, which had been diagnosed early in his youth, and not because of cannabis use. Researchers have since proved that Anslinger wrongly attributed many of the "Gore Files" stories to cannabis usage. During the 1937 Marihuana Tax Act hearings, Anslinger rehashed the 1933 Licata killings while giving testimony to Congress.

=== Racial prejudice ===
In the 1930s, Anslinger's anti-cannabis articles often contained racist themes, for example: "Colored students at the Univ. of Minn. partying with (white) female students, smoking [marijuana] and getting their sympathy with stories of racial persecution. Result: pregnancy." and "Two Negroes took a girl fourteen years old and kept her for two days under the influence of hemp. Upon recovery she was found to be suffering from syphilis."

Though these stories were often true (whatever the role of cannabis in them), Anslinger's basic attitude was shown in remarks not related to any particular story, such as: "Reefer makes darkies think they're as good as white men." This outlook extended to his broader public statements, in which he claimed of the estimated 100,000 cannabis smokers in the United States (1930s), most were, "Negroes, Hispanics, Filipinos, and entertainers." and that their "Satanic" jazz and swing music was itself a product of the drug, which he further alleged drove "White women to seek sexual relations with Negroes, entertainers, and others.” Anslinger also promoted the use of the Spanish derived "marijuana" or "marihuana" rather than "cannabis", a shift long interpreted to have reinforced associations between the drug and Mexican immigration.

==== Billie Holiday ====
There is no record of the Federal Bureau of Narcotics under Anslinger ever targeting Billie Holiday in response to her 1939 song "Strange Fruit," despite what discredited reporter Johann Hari claimed in his 2015 book, Chasing the Scream: The First and Last Days of the War on Drugs. Anslinger assigned an agent to "Holiday not for her politics, but as a “role model” drug case. [The] strategy was to pursue “high profile” users so as to discourage their fans from copying them." Jazz musicologist and historian Lewis Porter noted that "there was no federal objection to the song “Strange Fruit,” nor was there any campaign to suppress it" and Holiday was instead pursued by Bureau of Narcotics mainly for her history of drug use.

In his 1964 book, The Protectors, Anslinger included a chapter called "Jazz and Junk Don't Mix" mentioning Holiday and Charlie Parker, who both died after years of illegal heroin and alcohol abuse. Anslinger described Holiday as “the lady of the white gardenias and boxer pups, of ‘Travelin’ Light’ and half a hundred other heartbreaking songs.”

=== Campaign assessment ===
It was not until 1934, and his fourth year in office, that Anslinger considered cannabis to be a serious threat to American society. This was part of a worldwide trend, unrelated to racial or industrial issues in America. The League of Nations had already implemented restrictions on cannabis in the beginning of the 1930s, and many states in the U.S. had started restricting it in the years before Anslinger was appointed.

In 1935, President Franklin D. Roosevelt and his attorney general publicly supported the campaign. Anslinger's efforts were part of the government's broader push to alert the public about the danger of recreational drugs.

The La Guardia Committee, promoted by New York Mayor Fiorello La Guardia, conducted the first in-depth study of the effects of smoking cannabis, which was published in 1944. It contradicted claims made by the U.S. Treasury Department that smoking cannabis resulted in insanity, and determined that "the practice of smoking marihuana does not lead to addiction in the medical sense of the word." Anslinger condemned the report as unscientific.

== Later years ==
Later in his career, Anslinger was investigated for insubordination for attempting to halt the ABA/AMA Joint Report on Narcotic Addiction, a publication edited by the sociology Professor Alfred R. Lindesmith of Indiana University. Among other works, Lindesmith wrote Opiate Addiction (1947), The Addict and the Law (1965), and a number of articles condemning the criminalization of addiction. Nearly everything Lindesmith did was critical of the war on drugs, and he specifically condemned Anslinger's role. The AMA/ABA controversy is sometimes credited with ending Anslinger's position as Commissioner of the Federal Bureau of Narcotics.

Anslinger was re-appointed by President John F. Kennedy as Federal Bureau of Narcotics Commissioner in February 1961. The new president had a tendency to invigorate the government with more youthful civil servants and, by 1962, Anslinger was 70 years old, the mandatory age for retirement in his position. In addition, during the previous year, he had witnessed his wife Martha's slow and agonizing death due to heart failure. On his 70th birthday, May 20, 1962, Anslinger submitted his resignation to Kennedy. Because Kennedy did not have a successor in place, Anslinger stayed on until he was succeeded by Henry Giordano in August 1962. Following that, he was the United States representative to the United Nations Narcotics Commission for two years, after which he retired.

Anslinger provided morphine to Senator Joseph McCarthy, who was addicted to both alcohol and morphine. When Anslinger tried to persuade McCarthy to quit morphine, McCarthy reminded him of the potential for a public scandal. Anslinger relented and steadily supplied McCarthy with morphine that was paid for by the Bureau and obtained from a local drugstore. This arrangement continued until McCarthy's death in 1957.

By 1973, Anslinger was blind and suffered from angina and suffered from prostate cancer. Prior to his death, Anslinger was treated with morphine.

On November 14, 1975, at 1 p.m. at the age of 83, Anslinger died of heart failure at the former Mercy Hospital (later known as Bon Secours Hospital Campus of the Altoona Regional Health System in Altoona, Pennsylvania. He was buried at the Hollidaysburg Presbyterian Cemetery in Hollidaysburg, Pennsylvania.

He was survived by his son, Joseph Leet Anslinger, and a sister, according to John McWilliams's 1990 book, The Protectors: Harry J. Anslinger and the Federal Bureau of Narcotics (1930–1962).

== In the media ==
- Anslinger appears as himself in the 1948 adventure movie about breaking an international drug ring, To the Ends of the Earth.
- In 1973, Anslinger was portrayed by actor Edmond O'Brien in the film Lucky Luciano by Francesco Rosi, with Gian Maria Volonté.
- Anslinger's targeting of Billie Holiday and his role in the earliest days of the drug war are discussed in Jazz Times in 2021.
- Garrett Hedlund portrays Anslinger in the 2021 docudrama The United States vs. Billie Holiday on Hulu.
- Rainn Wilson portrays Anslinger in the 2021 podcast Toxicomanía: el experimento mexicano.

== Publications ==
- The Traffic in Narcotics, with William Finley Tompkins. Funk & Wagnalls, 1953.
- The Murderers, the story of the narcotic gangs, with Will Oursler. Farrar, Straus and Cudahy, 1961.
- The Protectors: Our battle against the crime gangs, with J. Dennis Gregory. Farrar, Straus and Company, 1964.

== See also ==
- LaGuardia Commission
- Havana Conference
- Legal history of marijuana in the United States
- Legal issues of cannabis
- L. G. Nutt
- Prohibition of drugs

Government offices
New office	Commissioner of the Federal Bureau of Narcotics; 1930 – 1962	Succeeded by Henry Giordano
