= Charlie Siragusa =

American narcotics agent

Charles Siragusa
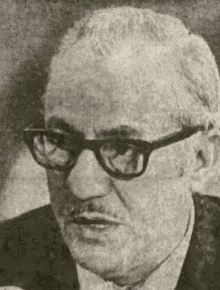
- Nicknames: "Charlie Cigars"; "Carl Salerno"
- Born: 28 October 1913; New York City, US
- Died: 15 April 1982 (aged 68) John F. Kennedy Memorial Hospital, West Palm Beach, Florida
- Buried: Saint Mary's Cemetery Buffalo Grove, Lake County, Illinois
- Allegiance: United States
- Branch: Federal Bureau of Narcotics; Office of Strategic Services; United States Navy; Central Intelligence Agency; Illinois Legislative Investigating Commission
- Rank: Lieutenant Commander; Assistant Commissioner
- Conflicts: World War II
- Awards: Exceptional Civilian Service Medal; Knight of the Ordine al Merito
- Other work: Appeared as self in "Lucky Luciano" movie

Charles Siragusa, also known as "Charlie Cigars", was a lifelong special investigator, undercover operative, spymaster, and federal agent for the Federal Bureau of Narcotics, a precursor to the modern Drug Enforcement Administration. During World War II, he worked in North Africa for the Office of Strategic Services. He is perhaps best known today for his 30-year pursuit of the Italian-American gangster Lucky Luciano, but also pursued other criminal personalities in his career; escaped Nazis in South America, deviant Italian Catholic monks, Soviet Communist cocaine smuggling networks, and many others. In 1973, he played the role of himself in the film Lucky Luciano. He is also remembered today as a facilitator and observer of the MKUltra experiments, managing the New York safehouses, eventually testifying before the United States Congress against members of his own agency and members of the Central Intelligence Agency.

== Early life ==
Siragusa was a second-generation American born in 1913 to Italian parents Giovanni and Rosa Siragusa. One of Siragusa's uncles was killed for refusing to pay a kickback on his wages.

== Federal agent ==
In 1939, Siragusa joined the Federal Bureau of Narcotics (FBN) as a special agent. He was then assigned to the office of Garland H. Williams, who managed the FBN District office of New York

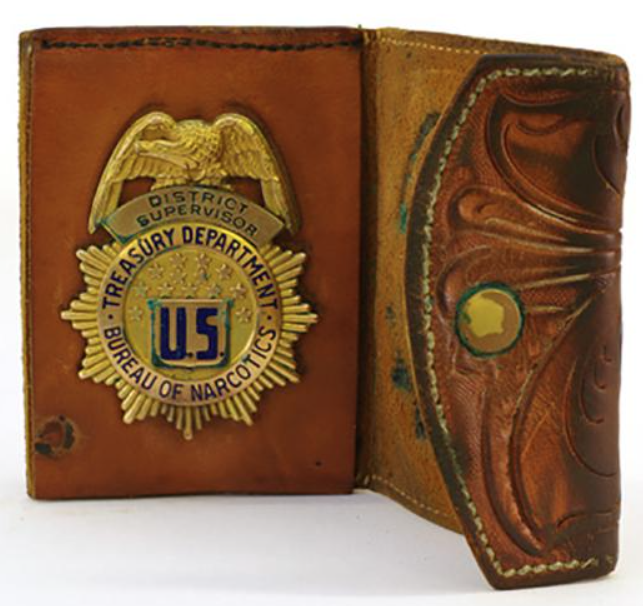
Badge of the Federal Bureau of Narcotics

In 1944, Siragusa attained the rank of Lieutenant Commander in the United States Navy while on assignment for James Angleton in the Office of Strategic Services. He was assigned to North Africa for the OSS.

In 1950, Siragusa was sent back to Europe to take over the hunt for Lucky Luciano from George Hunter White and Garland H. Williams. The hunt for Luciano would dominate the next decade of his life.

Luciano also had Siragusa on his mind. On one particular occasion, Luciano was asked by a group of reporters what he would like for Christmas. His response was "Siragusa in a ton of cement!"

In the summer of that year, Siragusa traveled to Turkey to act as a liaison to Turkish police forces, where he helped establish many federal programs there.

In 1951, Siragusa became the FBN Supervisory Agent (equivalent to an SAC) of an office in the United States Embassy in Rome that would be called "District 17," which covered the areas of Europe and the Middle East. Out of this office, Siragusa traveled to France, Spain, Portugal, Egypt, Iraq, Iran, and other locations to investigate narcotics.

In 1958, Siragusa was reassigned to Washington, and on behalf of Anslinger resumed contact with James Angleton and Counterintelligence at the Central Intelligence Agency, working on a project in New York City for Angleton in partnership with Dr. Ray Treichler.

In 1960, Siragusa was involved in an attempt to rescue CIA personnel imprisoned in Cuba after breaking into the Chinese Communist News Agency there.

In 1962, Siragusa became the Assistant Commissioner of the FBN.

When Luciano died of heart failure, Siragusa resigned from the FBN.

He joined the Illinois Legislative Investigating Commission, an organization established to investigate mob activity in Chicago and other cities in Illinois.

Siragusa claimed that the CIA approached him to coordinate domestic assassinations to be performed by his connections in the Italian Mafia, and he rejected them.

== Cases ==
Cases that Charles Siragusa pursued as a federal agent include;

- The Green Trunk of Alcamo
- The Case of the Lebanese Caramels
- The Schiaparelli Affair
- The Wehrmacht Leak
- Operation Old Goat
- The Queen Mother of Opium
- Just-Call-Me-Danny
- The French Connection
- The hunting of Eugene Dollmann
- The hunting of Fritz Schwend

== MKUltra and Midnight Climax ==
Controversially, Siragusa was also involved in the US government's experiments in finding a truth drug and mind control, to include MKUltra and Operation Midnight Climax. Operatives running the experiments claimed that Siragusa was only a manager during this time, and had little knowledge of what the experiments actually involved. Siragusa later testified before Congress, however, that Ray Treichler "wanted me to deny knowing about the safehouse... He didn't want me to admit that he was the guy. . . . I said there was no way I could do that."

== Authored works ==
- (with Robert Wiedrich) The Trail of the Poppy: Behind the Mask of the Mafia. Prentice-Hall. 1966.
