= Jerry M. Sage =

Canadian-born American soldier (1917-1993)

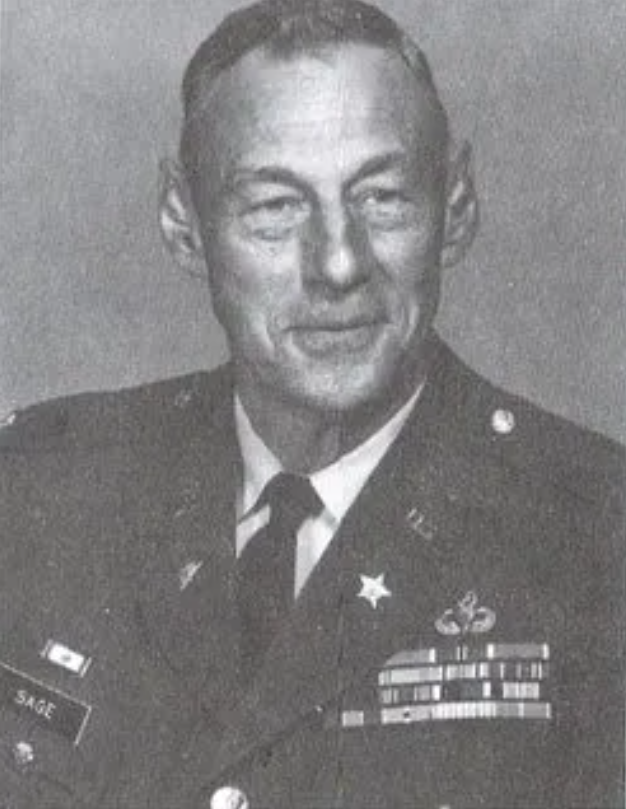
- Nicknames: "Cooler King"; "Dagger"
- Born: 27 May 1917; British Columbia, Canada
- Died: 26 March 1993 (aged 75) Dothan, Alabama, US
- Buried: Meadowlawn Cemetery
- Allegiance: United States
- Branch: United States Army; Office of the Coordinator of Information; Office of Strategic Services
- Rank: Colonel
- Commands: Commander, 10th Special Forces Group; Instructor, West Point Military Academy; Instructor, Reserve Officer Training Corps; Staff Officer, Pentagon
- Conflicts: World War II; Cold War; Korean War; Vietnam War
- Awards: Legion of merit; Distinguished member of the special forces regiment
- Alma mater: State College of Washington, Phi Beta Kappa
- Other work: University of South Carolina; Assistant to the President; High School teacher; Teacher of the year

Jerome Michael Sage, who mostly went by the name Jerry M. Sage, was a Canadian-born American soldier, special forces operator, and spy, prisoner of war during World War II. He was notable for over 15 prison escape attempts leading to 15 sentences in solitary confinement, earning him the name "Cooler King," until his final successful escape. Sage was the inspiration for Steve McQueen's character in The Great Escape. Sage stayed in the Army and also fought in the Korean War and Vietnam War. He is considered one of the fathers of United States Army Special Forces. One of the phases of the schoolhouse for special operators at Fort Bragg, the John F. Kennedy Special Warfare Center and School, is named Robin Sage, partially in his memory.

== Early life ==
Sage was born 1917 in British Columbia and grew up mostly in Indianapolis, Indiana, playing football and going to house parties while he was in high school.

Sage entered the Army in 1938 through the R.O.T.C. program of Washington State University, where he graduated with a Phi Beta Kappa key. He graduated with a commission into the Infantry in the Army Reserves.

After college, he worked for three and a half years at Procter & Gamble Distributing Company. Before entering the Army, he was the senior salesman for the middle Pacific region; Northern California, San Francisco, and Hawaii.

He first reported to active duty with the Army at the Presidio of San Francisco a little before Thanksgiving of 1941. For a few weeks, he worked in the field bakery platoon.

== World War II ==
=== Wild Bill and the 'Glorious Amateurs' ===
In December 1941, with the attack on Pearl Harbor, Sage was transferred to Fort Lewis, Washington, to prepare for deployment to the Pacific against the Japanese. He trained his bakery platoon in fighting infantry tactics, but within a few weeks, he received orders to report to the Q Building at the E Street Complex in Washington, D.C.

Sage was recruited into an organization run by William J. "Wild Bill" Donovan called the Office of the Coordinator of Information, which was the precursor to the Office of Strategic Services. He was one the first men from the Special Operations Branch selected by Millard Preston Goodfellow, David K. E. Bruce, and Garland H. Williams to attend a training camp set up by the British Special Operations Executive outside of Toronto, Canada called Camp X. There, he learned the British methods of sabotage, reconnaissance, guerrilla warfare, underwater and amphibious assault, trailing suspects, and managing networks.

The British gave him the nickname "Dagger," which he carried for the rest of his career.

Sage taught physical training to the new recruits of the Office of the Coordinator of Information, which later became the Office of Strategic Services.

Sage was deployed to colonial North Africa against the Germans and Italians as a member of the OSS, where he was captured by the Germans.

=== Stalag Luft III ===
Sage was taken to the prison camp Stalag Luft III, where he passed himself off as an airborne infantry officer, never revealing his membership in the OSS - had he done so, he would have been executed.

Sage unsuccessfully attempted to escape 15 times, leading to 15 separate incarcerations in solitary confinement in "the cooler," giving him the nickname "Cooler King." His most famous attempt was as a part of the "Great Escape," where he and many others worked for 15 months on the significant three-tunnel project.

Actor Steve McQueen portrayed a character based on Jerry and a mixture of other men in the movie, The Great Escape.

=== Escape from Oflag 64 ===
Sage was eventually transferred to the prison camp called Oflag 64, where he finally managed his escape - through Poland, into Ukraine down to Odessa, and then finally back into the custody of the OSS in Egypt 1945.

== After War II ==
Sage became an instructor at West Point, attended the Command and General Staff College, and the War College.

During the Cuban Missile Crisis, he served as a Staff Officer for the Joint Chiefs of Staff at the Pentagon.

He worked in Laos and trained with Montagnards in the highlands.

As a Colonel, Sage was assigned to Bad Tolz, Germany, where he commanded the 10th Special Forces Group.

Sage outlived both of his children. Sage's son, Terrence F. Sage, died serving the Army as a Captain during the Tet Offensive in Vietnam in 1968. Sage's daughter Barbara Ellen Bussard died in 1975.

Following that, he served with the Third Army in Atlanta and worked with Army ROTC programs at colleges and universities throughout the South. He later became Assistant to the President of the University of South Carolina in Columbia, S.C.

After a few years, he left to teach high school in the public school system and was nominated for and won "Teacher of the Year" for the state of South Carolina in 1979. In Enterprise, Ala., he was nominated for and won Enterprise Man of the Year in 1991.

== Later life ==
Sage retired from the Army on March 1, 1972, after 30 years of service.

He died of cancer at Dothan hospital, in Dothan, Alabama at the age of 75.
