= Operation Midnight Climax =

CIA sub-project of Project MKUltra studying the effects of LSD

Operation Midnight Climax was a Central Intelligence Agency (CIA) sub-project of the illegal Project MKUltra, the CIA mind-control research program that began in the 1950s. It was initially established in 1954 by Sidney Gottlieb and placed under the direction of the Federal Bureau of Narcotics in Boston, Massachusetts with the "Federal Narcotics Agent and CIA consultant" George Hunter White under the pseudonym of Morgan Hall.

Gottlieb was a chemist who was chief of the Chemical Division of the Office of Technical Service of the CIA. He based his plan for MKUltra and Midnight Climax on interrogation method research under Project Artichoke. Unlike Artichoke, Midnight Climax gave Gottlieb permission to test drugs on unknowing citizens, which created the infamous legacy of this operation. Hundreds of federal agents, field operatives, and scientists worked on these programs before they were shut down in the 1960s.

== Results ==
Official results of these experiments were not released, and accounts from supervisors of the experiments give little insight to the findings. George Hunter White, an agent at the Federal Bureau of Narcotics, and Ira "Ike" Feldman, a former military intelligence officer, who oversaw San Francisco experiments, noticed that subjects spoke far more freely when under the influence of a combination of drugs and sex. "No one knows where they [human test subjects] are now, or what effects they may have suffered."

== Background ==
=== History ===
Operation Midnight Climax was launched in 1954 and consisted of a web of CIA-run safehouses in San Francisco at 225c Chestnut Street, San Francisco, CA, in Mill Valley, California, as well as New York City. The safehouses were dramatically scaled back in 1963, following a report by CIA Inspector General John Earman which strongly recommended closing the facility. The San Francisco safehouses were closed in 1965, and the New York City safehouse soon followed in 1966. Operation Midnight Climax and Project MKUltra were considered to be so secretive that few people, even in the highest government positions, knew about Sidney Gottlieb or his connection to the LSD used in the operation.

=== Objectives and methodology ===
Operation Midnight Climax was established in order to study the effects of LSD on non-consenting individuals. Prostitutes on the CIA payroll were instructed to lure clients back to the safehouses, where they were surreptitiously plied with a wide range of substances, including LSD, and monitored behind one-way glass. The prostitutes were instructed in the use of post-coital questioning to investigate whether the victims could be convinced to involuntarily reveal secrets. The victims were sometimes fed subliminal messages in attempts to induce them to involuntary actions, including criminal activity such as robbery, assault, and assassination. Many of the CIA operatives involved in the experiments voluntarily indulged in the drugs and prostitutes for recreational purposes. Additionally, information from Wilmington News Journal on October 15, 1978, reports from a FOIA request that, "the spy agency purchased two pounds of Yohimbine hydrochloride ... by Dr. Robert V. Lashbrook, the chief aide to Dr. Sidney Gottlieb." The role of Dr. Lashbrook was to, "monitor and approve materials for Operation Midnight Climax."

Senate investigators were told that the goals of these experiments were to study mind control and sexual behavior. More specifically, to learn about the secrets of brainwashing to gain control over enemy spies and protect U.S. agents. Other objectives included finding drugs that could incapacitate entire buildings via poisoned food, which would create "confusion-anxiety-fear," and other symptoms such as headaches and earaches. These drugs could also have amnesia effects, which were intended for use on foreign spies following interrogations and retiring CIA agents. Another aspect they tested was the effect of combining LSD and isolation, where the subjects would be dosed and isolated for months at a time with minimal food and water.

== Ethical concerns ==
In 1947, the CIA was prohibited on behalf of President Truman, due to fears of political abuse, from spying against American citizens, but these actions contradict the adherence to this prohibition. These acts were illegal and several significant operational techniques were developed in this theater, including extensive research into sexual blackmail, surveillance technology and the possible use of mind-altering drugs in field operations. Furthermore, the CIA operatives in charge of administering these experiments were told by superiors that the results of the experiments would be beneficial to the country. There is currently a debate over how ethical White's actions were, with some arguing that if his motive was to legally make people suffer, he was unethical, while others argue that if he believed that the experiments would benefit national security, his actions could be justified. The subjects of Gottlieb's experiments also included mentally disabled children. Operation Midnight Climax was soon expanded, and CIA operatives began dosing people in restaurants, bars, and beaches along with signing up to use the drugs themselves. The extent to which this widespread exposure of the public to mind-altering drugs contributed to the rise of the counter-culture movement in the late 1950s and 1960s is unknown, although Ken Kesey has attributed his role in the genesis of the influential San Francisco Bay Area psychedelic social scene that developed in the 1960s to his participation in Project MKUltra LSD experiments at the Menlo Park, California, VA Hospital.

== Public sphere and U.S. government response ==
In 1974, The New York Times journalist Seymour Hersh published a story exposing the CIA's illegal spying on U.S. citizens and how the CIA had conducted non-consensual drug experiments. His report started the lengthy process of bringing long-suppressed details about MKUltra to light. Project MKUltra came to light in the spring of 1977 during a wide-ranging survey of the CIA's Technical Services Division. John K. Vance, a member of the CIA inspector general's staff, discovered that the agency was running a research project that included administering LSD and other drugs to unwilling human subjects. Additionally, several CIA FOIA requests revealed a collection of documents from several news sources in the late 1970s reporting information on Operation Midnight Climax.

There were a handful of newspaper articles released in the 1970s by the San Francisco Examiner, Wilmington News Journal, The Washington Post, and The Washington Star revolving around these revelations and elaborated on what the CIA was doing, but they fail to include much of the motive and explicit details as the CIA never released most of the findings and the information never went public.

In 1975, President Gerald Ford set up the United States President's Commission on CIA Activities. The purpose of this commission, which is commonly referred to as the Rockefeller Commission, was to investigate possible illegal activities being performed by the CIA. Project MKUltra, Operation Midnight Climax, and other similar projects were a part of the investigation. According to the Rockefeller Commission Report, the CIA was charged with various illegal activities such as large-scale spying on American citizens, engaging in illegal wire-taps, and aiming their illegal activities at Americans who openly disagreed with the government. As a result of these findings, Ford signed an Executive Order in 1976 that prohibited "experimentation with drugs on human subjects, except with the informed consent, in writing and witnessed by a disinterested party, of each such human subject." This attempted to prevent unethical projects from occurring in the future.

In 1977, Senator Ted Kennedy conducted congressional hearings investigating MKUltra. Many ex-CIA employees were brought in for questioning; Congress interrogated them about "who oversaw these programs, how participants were identified, and if any of these programs had been continued." After the incident came to light, the United States government was compelled by their constituents to find out the reasoning for these unethical experiments on the United States citizens. As a result, four subpoenas were issued by Senator Kennedy, one by his subcommittee on Health and Scientific Research. A former CIA employee, whose name is known as Walter Pasternak, was noted for "hiding from investigators" stating that he would return after 24 hours. The documents that the senate investigation committee revealed showed receipts signed by the former CIA employee for "$2,000 $100 bills that were distributed to persons involved in "Operation Midnight Climax."" Pasternak, the CIA employee, also provided the subcommittee with an account of how the activities were in relation to the CIA-funded research group that conducted human behavior experiments. Other CIA employees who were subpoenaed were Dr. Sidney Gottlieb and Robert Lashbrook and the consultant who was subpoenaed was a former Georgetown University professor, Dr. Charles Geschickter. When the hearing date came around, "all four of them made the decision independently not to testify". The senate committee continued to investigate the issue and were able to get testimony from Pasternak, yet the information from him and others related to the project wasn't considered the most accurate, resulting in a lack of action taken by the U.S. government against the CIA.

The CIA's LSD experiments continued until 1963 before being shut down. In 1963, John Vance, a member of the CIA Inspector General's staff, learned about the projects "surreptitious administration to unwitting nonvoluntary human subjects." Though the MKUltra directors argued for the continuation, the Inspector General insisted the agency follow ethical research guidelines, which brought the programs testing on non-consenting subjects to an end.

The paper records of the operation were destroyed, and during the trials, many agents claimed they could not remember details about it and there were no records for congress to verify, thus, leading to no noted convictions or justice for the CIA and individuals involved.

== Possible death ==
One possible death associated with Project MKUltra and Operation Midnight Climax was that of Frank Olson, a scientist who worked for the CIA and for the United States Army Biological Warfare Laboratories. Olson allegedly committed suicide in 1953 by jumping out of the window of his hotel room in New York City. This occurred after he drank a cocktail that had been secretly spiked with LSD while on a CIA retreat. The Olson family did not believe it was suicide and after the family announced they planned to sue the Agency over Olson's "wrongful death," the government offered them an out-of-court settlement of $1,250,000, later reduced to $750,000 (about $8.8 million in 2024 value), which they accepted. The family received apologies from President Ford and CIA director William Colby.

In 1994, Eric Olson had his father's body exhumed to be buried with his mother, and the family decided to have a second autopsy performed. The second autopsy revealed injuries that occurred before he fell, causing his death to become a debate between murder and suicide.

== Popular culture ==
The operation inspired Neal Bell's 1981 play Operation Midnight Climax.

== See also ==
- Human experimentation in the United States
- Charlie Siragusa
