= George Hunter White =

American law enforcement officer involved in MKUltra

George H. White
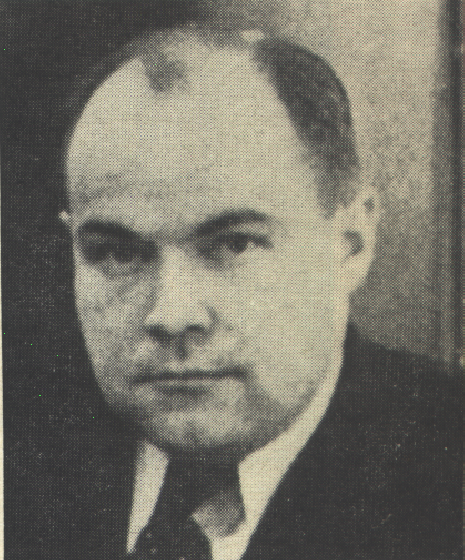

District Supervisor, Federal Bureau of Narcotics
- In office 1937–1952 Serving with Garland H. Williams
- Appointed by: Harry J. Anslinger

Supervisor at Large, Federal Bureau of Narcotics
- In office 1952–1965
- Appointed by: Harry J. Anslinger

Fire Chief, Stinson Beach Fire Department
- In office 1966–1975

Chief of X-2 Counterintelligence Branch
- In office March 1, 1943 – June 15, 1943
- Preceded by: Office Established
- Succeeded by: James R. Murphy

Personal details
- Born: June 22, 1908 Los Angeles, California, U.S.
- Died: October 23, 1975 (aged 67) San Francisco, California, U.S.
- Spouses: Mildred Genevieve Conover; Ruth Emily Miller; Albertina Calef
- Education: Oregon State College
- Height: 5ft 7in
- Aliases: Morgan Hall; John Wilson

Military service
- Allegiance: United States
- Branch/service: United States Army; Office of the Coordinator of Information; Office of Strategic Services
- Years of service: 1941–1945
- Rank: Colonel
- Commands: Commander, OSS Operational Group Calcutta; Chief Instructor, OSS Schoolhouse Area A; Commander, OSS Parachute Training Regiment
- Battles/wars: World War II; Pacific War; India in World War II

George Hunter White (June 22, 1908 – October 23, 1975) was an American federal agent. He was a Federal Bureau of Narcotics (FBN) investigator, undercover Central Intelligence Agency (CIA) operative, World War II veteran, and one of the men responsible for the capture of Lucky Luciano. He remained an FBN special agent throughout his federal service – while he was in the Army, at OSS, and the CIA, he was still operating as an FBN agent, sending regular reports on the worldwide narcotics trade to Anslinger.

While working for the Commissioner of the FBN, Harry J. Anslinger, White travelled around the world in pursuit of narcotics dealers and crime lords. During World War II, he trained undercover Allied operatives for the Office of Strategic Services on the fundamentals of counterespionage before they were deployed on missions in Europe, Asia, and Africa. He was also a federal observer for the controversial narcotics experiments by the Central Intelligence Agency as part of MK-ULTRA and Midnight Climax. During the "scientific experiment" known as Midnight Climax, White was responsible for dosing gangsters, pimps, prostitutes, and other American citizens with a variety of narcotics and drugs without their knowledge, and reporting their behaviors to Dr. Sidney Gottlieb.

Historians today openly acknowledge the problematic nature of White's status as the FBN's only-ever "Supervisor at Large," being granted extreme autonomy by Commissioner Anslinger to travel around the world and pursue narcotics dealers, considering the fact that he is well-known and well-documented to have consumed – at least once – most of the narcotics he was arresting others for possession, and stories told about him through the years by the agents who worked for him, such as Charlie Siragusa and Ira C. Feldman, add complexity. The historian John C. McWilliams, while giving a presentation at the DEA museum, remarked:

"If ever there was a rogue elephant in the FBN, it was White. He was the FBN's most unorthodox agent. He was a loner who did not want to be responsible for a partner. His personality and performance both awed and perplexed Anslinger, who saw White as ubiquitous and always ready to shake hands with trouble... A maverick agent whom even Anslinger sometimes could not control, White was a man of extreme contradictions with an extraordinary propensity to attract controversy."

Notably, White also kept a picture of a Japanese soldier that he had choked to death in a frame, hanging on the wall of his apartment, where he could stare at it from anywhere in the room. However, he would tell friends who visited his apartment that the soldier was watching over him, staring at him from beyond the grave. Some historians suggest this indicates traits of undiagnosed psychopathy. The journalist Johann Hari wrote: "The personality test given to all applicants on Anslinger’s orders found that [White] was a sadist." Stephen Kinzer said:

"George Hunter White, as you say, was a narcotics agent in New York, but he was the kind of narcotics agent who not only lived at the edge of the law. He crossed over a lot. He used all the substances that he confiscated from people. His use of alcohol and narcotics was legendary, but he was also a cop who did pursue jazz figures, including Billie Holiday."

In later life, he served as the chief of the Stinson Beach Fire Department.

== Early life and career as a crime journalist ==
White was born in 1908 in Los Angeles, California. White grew up in Alhambra, California, attending grammar and high schools there from 1912 to 1924. His father, Lafayette Dancy White, was at some point employed as a manager at Bank of America in an official capacity. Then, Lafayette was the City Manager of Alhambra for some time. At some point, Lafayette also served as Secretary of the Chamber, and also the elected Treasurer and Tax Collector for Alhambra. After this, the senior White was elected Mayor of Alhambra, serving as a member of the "Reformists." Lafayette White had a reputation for fighting corruption and crime. George White's mother was Hermina Brunner.

As a child, White had an affinity for the water, for fishing, and especially swimming. When he was a teenager on vacations to visit his relatives in Stinson Beach, California, White would often swim into the waters of the San Francisco Bay – despite the fact that he was constantly warned by his parents that the waters were shark infested. White also did not mind the cold temperature of the bay, evidenced by the fact that he would often swim for several miles at a time. While in school, White won many medals at competitive events for freestyle swimming. Swimming was a habit that stayed with him throughout his life, and by his early twenties, he had developed a swimmer's physique.

From 1924 to 1926, White attended Oregon State College and studied courses in business and sociology, but he dropped from the program in 1926 to join the American Red Cross in Los Angeles, serving as that location's director of First Aid and Life Saving.

In 1928, White moved to San Francisco, where from 1928 to 1929, White worked as a police reporter for the San Francisco Bulletin and the Call-Bulletin.

After moving back to Los Angeles in 1930, White continued as a police reporter until 1932 at the City News Service of Los Angeles. He covered several narcotics trials there. One of the criminal trials that White covered for the paper was that of the notorious mobster Jack Dragna. While working on this assignment, White met a man named John Roselli (whose real name was Filippo Sacco), and formed relationship with him that was both professional and friendly. Roselli had recently arrived from Boston. White used Roselli as a source for several stories, just at the time when Roselli was abandoning his Italian accent and entering into the socialite classes of Hollywood.

While he was working on a story for the City News Service about the owners of Hollywood studios practicing illegal gambling, White started to realize that he didn't want to just write about crime, he wanted to fight crime. White immediately applied to virtually every agency he could find. The first institution he applied for was the world-famous Los Angeles Narcotics Squad of the Los Angeles Police Department. During his interview with the squad's Captain, Edward "Eddie" Chitwood, White said: "Newspapering is all right, but it makes a bystander out of you. I want to get out on the field, where the game is going on."

In 1931, the City News Service was bought out by the Hearst Company, and White officially quit journalism.

White became a private detective and investigator, working for several employers over the next several years simultaneously. From 1932 to 1933, White was enrolled as private investigator for the managing editor of the Los Angeles Evening and Herald Express. His job for them involved investigating libel suits that had been filed against the newspaper.

Around the same time, from 1932 to 1934, White was contracted by the former Justice Department agent Harold Hayden Dolley, and worked multiple cases for Dolley. Dolley served in an official capacity in the California state law enforcement community but also owned his own private detective agency. Dolley was formerly the chief Bureau of Prohibition agent for the state of California, and had formerly been the chief Prohibition agent of Los Angeles and Southern California. During his tenure as a Dry Chief in California, Dolley had once been accused of framing an Italian steamship agent named Morris Orsatti, but was subsequently cleared of charges. Later in his career, Dolley was accused of illegal wire tapping, but on the day he was to be suspended from federal service, the Dry Commissioner David H. Blair sent a telegram to Prohibition Director Samuel F. Rutter, demanding his suspension to be lifted. After his retirement from the Bureau, and entry into private detective work, Dolley was then accused of witness tampering in the trial of Alexander Pages. When White went to work for him, Dolley decided to hire the professional swindler, West Coast rope Iris Ford to privately tutor White about crime.

On Jan 6, 1935, Dolley died suddenly in San Diego.

On November 12, 1933, while working as a private detective, White married his first wife, Mildred Genevieve Conover. The wedding was held in Los Angeles. They separated only after one year. In 1936, White was officially divorced from Mildred, with the charge brought against him, as indicated in his FBI file being "desertion and mental cruelty."

== Federal agent ==
=== Border Patrol (1934–1936) ===
On August 30, 1934, White joined the United States Border Patrol along the US-Mexico border, his first assignment as a federal officer of the law. White described the Border Patrol as: "a herding, harassing and alien-ejecting police force whose well-meaning but often short-tempered officers found it difficult to remember that their border-jumping subjects were human beings whose defections were not exactly heinous or vicious in nature."

White was employed at the Border Patrol as a frontier patrol agent, checking in on ranches near the border, tracking down fence-hoppers and chasing down people trying to dodge the roadblocks set up at border crossings. He would also check out freight trains for illicit goods and undocumented migrants, as well as homeless encampments in the towns on the US side of the border. There were many of these homeless encampments in the United States and Mexico at that time, being the height of the Great Depression.

However, after seven months on the border, White was assigned to the Border Patrol's Intelligence Unit, located in Calexico, California. White had by then a mastery of the Spanish language, and he was at this time given his first assignments as an undercover agent. As an undercover agent, White worked for eighteen months on an assignment in several border towns. While working on this assignment, White met several agents from the Federal Bureau of Narcotics (FBN). One of these agents was Spencer Stafford, who greatly encouraged White to join the FBN as a dopebuster.

=== Early career at the Federal Bureau of Narcotics (1936) ===
In late 1935, White took the entrance exam for the FBN. This entrance exam was not promising, as on his official entrance paperwork, White was noted by his interviewers as having displayed all of the hallmarks of a sadist. The Commissioner of Narcotics, Harry J. Anslinger, was extremely reluctant to hire him. Anslinger was also aware by this point that White had also failed his application, twice, with the Federal Bureau of Investigation (FBI) once before applying to the FBN, and the second time in 1936. According to the official FBI account of White's application process, White's "personality, approach, and appearance were not up to Bureau standards." Anslinger had formed a similar opinion regarding White and the FBN. However, the former Secretary of the Treasury, U.S. Senator William Gibbs McAdoo was a close family friend, and interceded on White's behalf above Anslinger in the chain of command at the Treasury Department. White was hired by the FBN in 1936.

Anslinger didn't know what to do with White, placing the rookie agent initially for several months in the Midwestern United States, in cities like Saint Paul and Minneapolis, where White's performance was sub-par and less than desired by Anslinger. White also hated the midwest, considering these cities to be slow and unsophisticated compared to the cities he had formerly lived in on the West Coast. White also found that the solo nature he had developed in his former professions clashed greatly with the teamwork atmosphere at the FBN, and he hated the bureaucratic rules that came with the organization. Anslinger said of White at the time that: "I was at first inclined to fire White for not displaying enough get-up-and-go."

At the end of these several months, White was then sent to San Francisco. A week into his first undercover assignment in the Tenderloin, White lost all of his "buy money" (pocket money used for undercover exchanges) to two local con artists who had offered to sell him opium. The pair took the cash and vanished. White later tracked them down at a waterfront gin mil on the wharf. When he attempted to arrest them using his badge and service weapon, but the situation escalated, one man seized his primary service weapon while the other knocked him to the ground. In response, White drew a concealed derringer and fired, but the bullet deflected off his target’s skull.

=== Infiltrating the Hip Sing Tong (1936) ===
Anslinger was furious at White over the incident, especially the fact that it had garnished so much attention in the San Francisco press. White was immediately sent to Seattle, which Anslinger thought was a fitting punishment. During the Great Depression, Seattle had developed the largest Hooverville in the entire USA (among the several Hoovervilles that existed in that city) and was also the home to the first-ever Skid Row in the USA. Seattle had proven exceptionally difficult for the FBN to operate within. Anslinger considered the city out-of-the-way and not worth his time, and thought that placing White here would encourage the agent to "get up and go."

In December, 1936, White arrived in Seattle. He immediately headed to Skid Row, scooping around several locations on Yesler Way. On the 12th of December, White spotted a man distributing opium out of the hollow of his walking crutches. White arrested him, and the man identified his source as Lum Soon Git (Charlie Lum), an alleged enforcer associated with the criminal faction of the Hip Sing Tong. Although Git had an extensive record, White discovered he was merely a minor intermediary in the larger drug trade.

When White attempted to apprehend Git, the gangster responded with a proposal: he would work as a confidential informant (CI) in return for his freedom and occasional financial compensation. White was initially skeptical, but after extensive questioning, he concluded that Git might serve as a valuable asset to the FBN. White brought the proposal to his superior, District Supervisor J.B. Greeson, highlighting Git’s claim that he could introduce them to a major narcotics trafficker. White and Git had devised a plan to infiltrate the dealer’s network. Greeson, after consulting with Commissioner Anslinger in Washington, D.C., gave cautious approval to the plan. Both Green and Anslinger recognized that the plan was highly risky, and that no federal agent in history had yet penetrated the closely guarded Chinese narcotics networks, let alone a white man.

To become fully prepared for the operation, White began learning Mandarin Chinese, the primary language spoken by members of the Tong.

Git’s target was Chin Joo Hip, a figure known by aliases such as the “King of Montana” and the “Old Man of Butte.” Hip ran an extensive narcotics, gambling, and prostitution ring out of Butte, Montana, with connections to organized crime in major cities including Los Angeles, Chicago, Kansas City, Pittsburgh, and New York. According to Git, Hip’s operation trafficked several hundred pounds of opium each month across the country.

In early February 1937, under the alias John Wilson, White boarded a train to Montana with Lum Git to begin the infiltration.

Chin Jo Hip presented a strikingly theatrical appearance, reminiscent of characters from early Hollywood films. Dressed in a traditional hanfu and sporting a long, drooping Fu Manchu moustache, the elderly figure welcomed White and Git into his Butte residence above his storefront. During their meeting, White introduced himself as an intermediary representing a wealthy relative on the West Coast who was seeking to purchase large quantities of opium and morphine. Git, anticipating skepticism, emphasized the importance of adapting to a changing world, noting that rejecting a business opportunity based solely on race would mean ignoring access to significant untapped markets. Despite this appeal, Jo Hip remained cautious. He stated that he did not handle direct transactions himself; instead, his narcotics supply came from a contact in New York City who received coded messages and shipped the drugs via air mail under the cover of a legitimate mail order operation. Jo Hip used the term “sugar” as a coded reference for morphine (a euphemism White would later repurpose in the 1950s for LSD).

White and his informant Git then traveled by train to New York to locate and investigate Jo Hip’s supplier, a figure known as Jimmy Wong. In his life, White had never before traveled East of the Mississippi River. The busy city of New York mesmerized him.

Working from a suite in the Times Square Hotel, one room used for meetings and an adjacent one outfitted with surveillance equipment operated by two Federal Bureau technical agents, White arranged a meeting with Jimmy Wong using a letter of introduction provided by Chin Jo Hip. The meeting gave White direct access to Wong, and he soon discovered that Wong’s narcotics network was far more extensive than anticipated, with distribution links in nearly every major East Coast city.

Impressed by the progress of the operation, Harry Anslinger assigned a team of experienced agents to support White in building a case against Wong. After several months of undercover work and travel across the country, the FBN launched a coordinated crackdown on November 19, 1937. The operation resulted in over fifty arrests nationwide and the seizure of hundreds of pounds of illegal drugs. White received widespread recognition in the press for his role in the case, and Anslinger personally commended him, promoting him to a position in the Bureau’s prestigious Manhattan office. There, White would serve under the legendary senior field officer Garland Williams. In 1938, 30 members of the Hip Sing Tong organization were convicted and sent to federal prison.

=== The French Connection ===
Garland Williams had been promoted to District Supervisor of the FBN's New York field office in the mid 1930's. Around this time, the FBN became aware of the French Connection. In the 1930's, 1 in every 18 persons living in the United States lived in one of the five burroughs of New York City. The connection between the Mafia and the French Connection emerged as a notable focus for the FBN. The first known FBN report indicating that members of the New York Mafia were sourcing heroin from Corsican suppliers dates back to 1934. Corsica, a large Mediterranean island officially part of France, has long had a distinct cultural and linguistic identity, with many Corsicans historically advocating for independence from French rule. According to the 1934 report, heroin entering New York was being routed through Corsica and distributed under the control of the Unione Corse, a powerful criminal organization often described as the Corsican counterpart to the Sicilian Mafia. Geographic and linguistic proximity between Corsica and Sicily facilitated cooperation. Corsican shares similarities with Sicilian, making communication and coordination between the two groups relatively easy.

White’s assignment to New York came at a pivotal moment in American criminal history: the height of organized crime. Shortly after his arrival, White began working alongside Garland Williams in dismantling the numerous international narcotics networks operating in the city. Together, White and Williams carried out a series of successful investigations and arrests, generating favorable media coverage and reinforcing the public profile of the FBN, much to the satisfaction of Commissioner Anslinger.

Describing New York City during this time, White wrote: "The period is that of Luciano and Anastasia, Lepke and Costello and cement-garnished Hudson River interments for the abruptly deceased..."

In 1938, he shot New York City drug dealer Albert "Tuffy" Jackson in the head and abdomen while working undercover.

Around 1939 or 1940 during an FBN investigation in New York, White first encountered a gangster named August "Little Augie" Del Gracio, who was a mob lieutenant for the notorious gangster Lucky Luciano. Although Del Grazio was apprehended for opium possession, he was released due to insufficient evidence.

On June 27, 1939, White remarried to Ruth Emily Miller. The marriage was officiated in the town of Manassas in Prince William County, Virginia. They remained married throughout the war, but Ruth soon began to despise White.

== World War II ==
=== Camp X ===
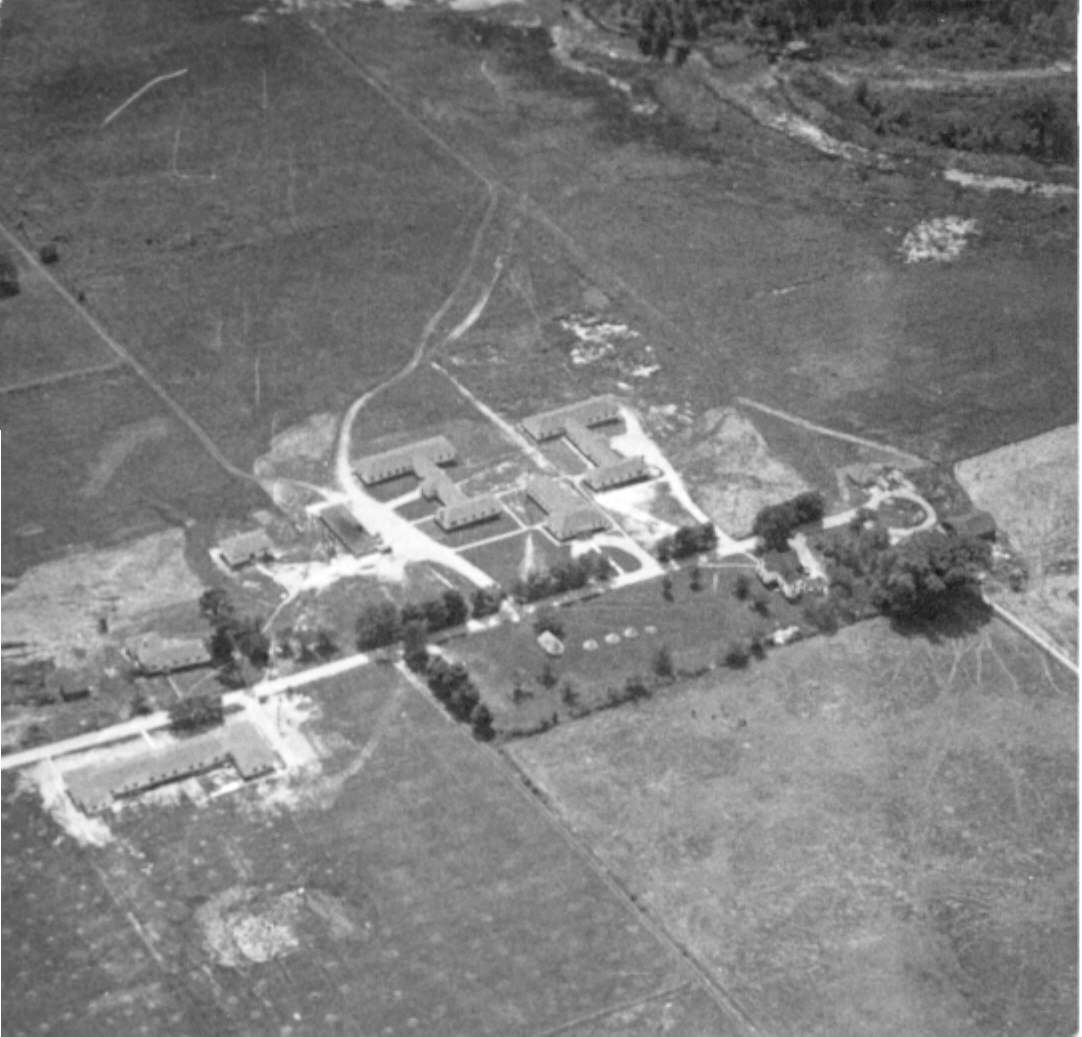
Sky view of Camp X

When the United States declared war on Germany in World War II, White was one person on a list of names that Anslinger sent to William J. Donovan, Millard Preston Goodfellow, and David K. E. Bruce to use in the effort against the Axis powers in their new intelligence agency - what was at that time called the Office of the Coordinator of Information (COI), the direct precursor to the Office of Strategic Services (OSS), and what would eventually become the Central Intelligence Agency (CIA).

In January 1942, at the rank of Captain, White was selected as one of a dozen COI men of the Special Operations Branch (SO) to attend training at a British Special Operations Executive (SOE) training camp outside of Toronto, Canada, called Camp X. There, he was trained in British methods of sabotage, reconnaissance, guerrilla warfare, underwater and amphibious assault, trailing suspects, and managing networks. One of his training instructors was Richard Melville Brooker, who became the Commandant of Camp X. White is quoted as calling this the "school of mayhem and murder." Other COI men sent to Camp X at this time included Louis D. Cohen, Philip Strong, and Kenneth Downs. Early in February, the OSS men arrived in Canada by train, and were whisked into an awaiting car which transported them to the camp somewhere near Oshawa.

=== OSS training instructor and X-2 Commander ===
In the spring of that year, White became one of the cadre of instructors at the COI schoolhouses in Washington, D.C. under the command of his FBN Supervisor and COI Training Director Garland H. Williams, where he taught counterintelligence to hundreds of would-be and hopeful undercover operatives and guerrilla warfighters. Those operatives and operators who were successful were then deployed around the world to fight the Axis powers. Additionally, around this time the COI was making its full transition into the OSS; normal training activities weren't interrupted for White, but the letterheads on the documents sent from headquarters did change their logo.

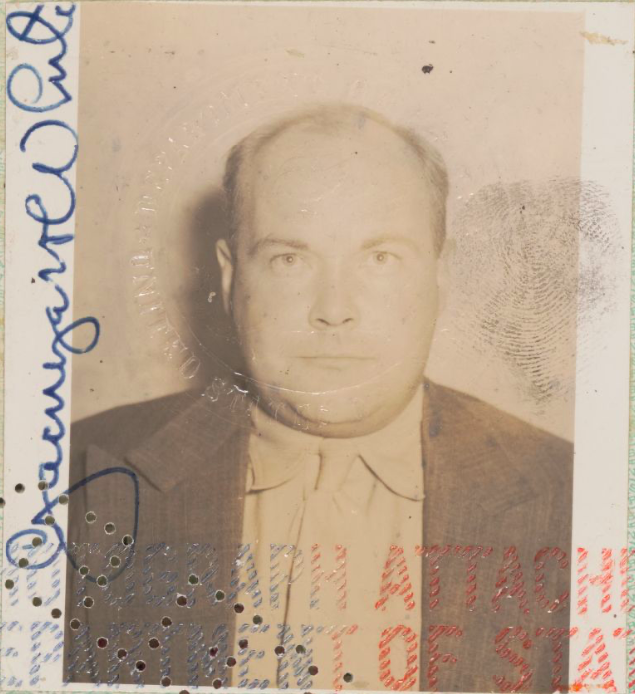
In 1942, White was issued a "special passport" for government travel during the war.

White, Strong, and Cohen played large roles in shaping the training protocols of the OSS. White served as chief instructor at Area A, a 5,000-acre wooded training site located approximately five miles west of Quantico, Virginia. In August 1942, Strong was appointed head of Special Operations, while Cohen later assumed leadership roles at Areas B and E, both located near Washington, D.C.

In May 1942, White took charge of the camp’s parachute training program and, by the end of the summer, became director of X-2, the OSS branch responsible for counterespionage and its training. His personal diary notes frequent interactions during this period with his trainee James Angleton, who would later head counterintelligence at the CIA. Other OSS members that White trained around this time included; Richard Helms, William Colby, Gregory Bateson, Carleton S. Coon, Michael Burke, Alfred M. Hubbard, James A. Hamilton, Lyman B. Kirkpatrick, Jr., Thomas Karmessines, and Frank Wisner. White also trained another OSS officer who would become a future FBN agent: Howard Chappel, who had just gotten out of federal prison.

Given that X-2 personnel were expected to carry out covert investigations abroad, their preparation required rigorous instruction in espionage techniques. As part of this training, White and Williams had the students assigned to the FBN New York office, where they developed hands-on experience in surveillance, interrogations, searches, wiretapping, covert entry, and other essential methods used in clandestine operations. White was also allowed to continue certain investigations for the FBN during this time in New York, provided that they assisted the war effort.

A young trainee under White's tutelage in both the FBN and the OSS at the time, Charlie Siragusa, describing White's training methods said:

"George had no patience with theory or textbook techniques. Everything he taught were things that he himself had actually performed in real situations. Sometimes the stuff he came up with was pretty damn scary."

White became known for his creative and rigorous instructional methods. He developed a series of field exercises in which trainees were required to construct convincing cover identities, obtain supporting documentation, and then attempt to infiltrate secure industrial facilities in one of four selected cities; Chicago, Baltimore, Pittsburgh, or Philadelphia. These exercises were not only valuable for training purposes but also helped expose vulnerabilities in the security protocols of American defense plants.

=== Deployment to India ===
The special passport issued to White in 1942 includes the following stamped visas during the war: Egypt, Syria, Iran, Iraq, Palestine, Trinidad and Tobago, France and French North Africa, Brazil, Turkey, the United Kingdom, India, Ceylon, and China. It is likely that he traveled to other locations during the war.

In late 1943, the OSS faced a serious intelligence breach in Calcutta, India, where Allied shipping operations in the region were centered. Air raids by Japanese forces were suspiciously timed to coincide with peak port activity, suggesting the presence of an informant within the shipyards. Despite efforts, OSS personnel were unable to identify the source of the leak. In response, Donovan sent White to investigate. Operating undercover as a longshoreman during the day, White systematically observed the port’s activity and mingled with its nightlife, including visits to local bars and brothels, in order to gather intelligence.

According to The Washington Post, one night, while he was in Calcutta, White was hiding in the closet of a hotel room where he was observing a clandestine meeting between a Japanese soldier and a US Army soldier. Reportedly, the Japanese soldier was the head of a clandestine Japanese intelligence unit based in Calcutta. The US soldier was suspected of selling secrets to the Japanese, and White was sent to observe the transaction. However, the US soldier had gotten cold feet, deciding not to sell state secrets, and attempted to abandon the sale of information. The Japanese soldier pulled a knife on the American soldier, and White popped out of the closet and shot the Japanese soldier dead with his personal .38 caliber nickel-plated revolver. White would keep that revolver for the rest of his career.

However, H.P. Aberelli writes:

The cinematic-like account of White's violent dispatch of the spy has been repeated often in words and print, never losing its shock value. However, the actual event itself strays some distance away from the widely spread legend and the truth. Make no mistake, White was reasonably certain that he had identifiedthe spy, and the man was a Chinese resident of Calcutta, but the disguise and crutch were pure invention, and the setting of the event mostly fiction. The more accurate version is that after weeks of investigation, White had become fairly certain that the spy was a Chinese bootmaker who operated a small shop in the city's commerce center. After days and nights of steadfast surveillance, White secreted himself in the man's shop early one morning, having prearranged for his subordinate on the assignment, Army Sergeant Frank Welch, to enter the shop shortly after it opened. The plan was that Welch would attempt "to skillfully extract information" from the man while White observed from his hiding place. But the plan failed to come off as expected. The shopkeeper, while "undergoing" what White later termed "some sensitive interchange" with Welch, apparently felt threatened and pulled a "long and very sharp knife." Thinking Welch was about to be stabbed, White, again in his own terms, "interfered terminally" with his revolver.

In another incident, White strangled a Japanese man with his bare hands. Several journalists, and even one of White's former underlings, have said that they do not know if the man was actually a soldier, or if he was a civilian.

== Search for The T-Drug ==
In September 1942, during the height of the US involvement in World War II, White became a key figure in a secret joint FBN-OSS series of experiments in which the United States Government desired to create a "Truth Drug," or "T-Drug," for short. The T-Drug experiments were "a search for a drug or narcotic capable of forcing the subject to tell the truth." On the OSS side, his commanding officer was the renowned biochemist, Dr. Stanley Platt Lovell, the head of the OSS Research and Development Branch (also known as the "Dirty Trucks Department"), who oversaw the T-Drug experiments for Donovan. White's job here was to dose US citizens with marijuana and other drugs and narcotics without their knowledge, and observe their behaviors afterwards.

John C. McWilliams writes:

Since the beginning of World War II, the possibility of finding a truth drug that would induce enemy prisoners to reveal secret information had intrigued Donovan. White's background in narcotics enforcement and his flair for the unorthodox made him the ideal candidate to collaborate with Stanley Lovell, the OSS director of Research and Development, in the search for such a drug.

He recorded all of his findings and delivered them to Lovell, with additional copies being delivered to Anslinger. White's experimental targets during this time included members of the Manhattan Project, suspected Communists, and Lucky Luciano's mafia lieutenant August "Little Augie" Del Gracio.

After the team's initial experiments with scopolamine and morphine, researchers shifted focus to mescaline and tetrahydrocannabinol acetate (a synthetic derivative of cannabis). In January 1943, U.S. Army Intelligence established a committee to evaluate the potential of such substances, particularly for use on captured German naval personnel. One of the committee’s members was Harry Anslinger. However, after approximately six weeks of testing, no substance demonstrated consistent results as a so-called "truth drug."

At the same time, White traveled across Palestine and Egypt for consultations with local OSS officers. He returned to the U.S. in March 1943 and spent several weeks in meetings between Washington and New York, conferring with intelligence officials, including Anslinger, on the development of interrogation-enhancing drugs.

In an effort to better understand the effects of THC acetate, White chose to ingest the substance himself on May 24, 1943. According to personal records, the result was simply a state of unconsciousness, suggesting the dosage was ineffective for interrogation purposes.

In the summer of 1943, White continued to be involved with the experiments and meetings with fellow intelligence figures such as James Angleton, Dr. Winfred Overholser, and Dr. Harold A. Abramson. During this time, he also began testing the compounds on civilians. Additional testing of the cannabis-derived substance focused on methods of covert administration, including mixing it into cigarettes, candy, carbon dioxide vapor, and even facial tissues treated with the extract.

In August 1943, a batch of the extract, produced under strict secrecy in Washington, D.C., was transported by Colonel White to New York City. The transport was closely guarded by armed counterintelligence personnel throughout the train journey.

Once in New York, the T-Drug was tested on seven military personnel, both officers and enlisted men, in rooms leased by the OSS at the Belmont Plaza Hotel. Colonel White’s records do not clarify whether the test subjects were informed of the nature of the experiments.

=== Practical T-Drug experimentation backfires (1943) ===
Late in 1943, a larger test was conducted on 30 American citizens suspected of having Communist affiliations. Results appeared promising, with five individuals reportedly acknowledging Communist sympathies under the influence of the substance. However, when the OSS attempted to apply the drug in an actual intelligence scenario, the effort backfired. The interrogator unintentionally inhaled the drug-laced cigarettes himself, resulting in an emotional outburst in which he accused his superior of making advances toward his wife. Meanwhile, the German U-boat officer being interrogated provided little of value.

These experiments were mostly wrapped up at the end of the war. Donovan showed no interest, and neither did the new President. White and another counterintelligence agent secured files from the FBI and continued their experiments at the FBN for several months after the OSS committee had dissolved. However, after several experiments, White eventually concluded that the search would go nowhere.

The New York Times wrote:

The marijuana derivative, according to a 1943 O.S.S. report in Colonel White's files, was “not a perfect ‘truth drug’ in the sense that its administration was followed immediately and automatically by the revelation of all the secrets which the subject wishes to keep to himself.” “Indeed,” it added, “a careful evaluation of the psychological mechanisms involved leads to the conclusion that such a goal is beyond reasonable expectation from any drug.”

== White inadvertently launches Operation Underworld (1942) ==
One of the men that White targeted with the T-Drug experiment at this time was the renowned criminal underworld figure August "Little Augie" Del Grazio, an international narcotics trafficker linked to organized crime figures and a mob lieutenant of Charles "Lucky" Luciano. Their relationship had resumed in 1942, when Del Grazio approached White with an offer to provide information in exchange for relief from harassment by other narcotics agents, unaware that White and the agent in question, Charles Siragusa, were coordinating efforts. Although Del Grazio’s intelligence had limited immediate value to the FBN or the OSS, White resumed contact with him in late 1942 after a temporary overseas assignment for Donovan. In early 1943, Del Grazio claimed he could offer information beneficial to U.S. military operations in Sicily. According to later testimony, this information was tied to a proposal originating from Luciano, who sought early release from prison in exchange for cooperation.

White reported the matter to Donovan. While both men expressed skepticism about working directly with Luciano, discussions involving his legal representatives continued. White later remarked that entertaining such proposals was inappropriate, even within the OSS's flexible wartime framework.

Despite initial resistance, the Office of Naval Intelligence ultimately pursued Luciano's cooperation as part of Operation Underworld, a secret initiative to secure U.S. ports against Axis sabotage. Due to the program's classified nature and the deaths of key participants, the full extent of Luciano's contribution remains uncertain. However, in recognition of his assistance, the governor of New York commuted Luciano's sentence.

Throughout these developments, Del Grazio continued participating in experimental trials. In one instance, he was given two cigarettes laced with measured doses of THC acetate. While under the influence, he spoke extensively and made several notable claims: that a senior law enforcement official had accepted bribes over a prolonged period and that control of the American underworld had consolidated under a criminal syndicate led by Meyer Lansky, Frank Costello, Benjamin "Bugsy" Siegel, Abner "Longie" Zwillman, and Willie Moretti. At another session, Del Grazio reportedly offered to arrange the assassination of labor leader John L. Lewis if it would aid the war effort. He also disclosed other information that remained classified as late as 1967, when partial OSS files were declassified by the CIA.

White regarded the initial phase of the experiment as a success, although a follow-up encounter proved less effective. On that occasion, Del Gracio reportedly became overly intoxicated, experienced tingling sensations in his limbs, and was forced to lie down and rest.

== After the war ==
In 1945, White's second wife, Ruth Emily Miller, divorced him. According to the investigative author Douglas Valentine:

"Although George White had notoriety and powerful friends, and existed above the law as one of Espionage Establishment's "protected few," he was a deeply conflicted man. His [second] wife, Ruth, deserted him in 1945, calling him "a fat slob," and according to psychological reports compiled while he was applying for employment with the CIA, White compensated for that humiliation by seeking attention, and by hurting people."

On July 12, 1945, following the conclusion of World War II in Europe, Colonel George White returned from overseas and spent several days in New York City before traveling to Washington, D.C., to meet with Harry Anslinger to discuss White's transition back into full time FBN status. Soon after, White was discharged from both the OSS and the US Army, and was appointed branch chief of the Narcotics Bureau in Chicago. White was District Supervisor of the Chicago office between 1945 and 1947, but was hardly ever in the office for longer then a few weeks at a time. While he was in Chicago, White cultivated a confidential informant for the FBN named Jack Ruby, who was picked up and arrested after a major opium bust. In the interrogation room, Ruby agreed to White's terms, and was set free.

By early September 1945, White resumed his field activities and traveled to Miami, where he met with Santo Trafficante, Sr., a prominent figure in organized crime. Trafficante controlled a network of gambling establishments, narcotics trafficking routes, and prostitution operations based in Havana, and was closely linked to well-known underworld figure Meyer Lansky. From his base in Tampa, Florida, Trafficante Sr. coordinated criminal enterprises in both the United States and Cuba, with the assistance of his son, Santo Trafficante, Jr. (who would later be involved in covert operations with the CIA, including plots to assassinate Cuban leader Fidel Castro using toxins developed at Fort Detrick, where Frank Olson had formerly worked as a biochemist).

The Miami meeting was reportedly the first of several interactions between White and the Trafficante family over the following decade. During this same period, White is believed to have contacted various other organized crime leaders, although the specific purposes of these visits remain unclear. Notably, several of the individuals he met would later appear as confidential CIA assets involved in intelligence operations and assassination plans.

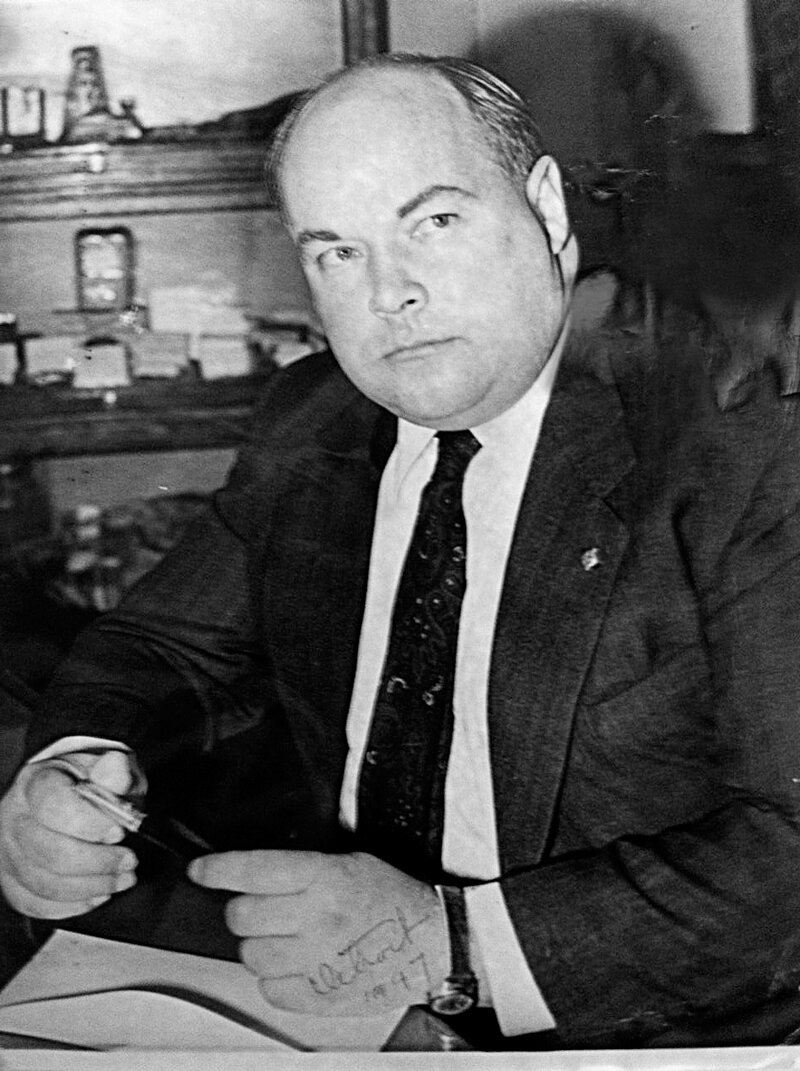
George Hunter White, posing for a photograph at his office as District Supervisor for FBN Chicago in 1947.

In 1946, White was responsible for apprehending and shutting down the criminal organization of Arthur Zweier in Mexico.

=== Hunting Lucky Luciano ===
In 1946, Lucky Luciano was granted parole, a decision reportedly linked to services rendered during World War II during Operation Underworld. White would later claim that Luciano had bribed the New York State Governor Thomas Dewey with major campaign contributions.

Luciano later told a reporter:

"You know how I got out? This is the truth. I told my lawyers to get everything they could on a certain man. They had a book full of stuff. Then my lawyer walked in and threw it on his desk, and told him if I wasn’t deported, anything to get out of prison, this would be made public information. They think I was bad, they should’ve seen what we had on him, this honorable public servant.”

According to Luciano, the deal was that Luciano would be a free man, as long as he stayed in Europe and kept his mouth shut, but Luciano didn't stay in Europe. Luciano did initially return to Italy, and from Italy, he became increasingly involved in expanding organized crime’s role in the international narcotics trade. According to Garland Williams, a significant shipment of heroin valued at $250,000 was smuggled into the United States within three months of Luciano’s return to Europe in 1947. Personnel from the FBN, along with the American consulate and Italian police authorities (the Questura), had been tasked with observing various figures, including fugitive Nicola Gentile. Internal communications among these agencies referenced broader efforts against individuals implicated in narcotics violations. One memorandum, dated July 31, 1946, specifically named “Charles Lucania” in this context.

However, in October of that year, Luciano traveled to Cuba, by way of South America. At the time, FBN agents stationed in Italy were already monitoring Luciano’s activities. Luciano immediately resumed directing elements of the American criminal syndicate, and began to secure the island of Cuba in the interests of the mob. While based on the island, Luciano reportedly authorized the killing of Benjamin “Bugsy” Siegel, allegedly due to financial irregularities during the construction of the Flamingo Hotel in Las Vegas.

Harry Anslinger then launched an all-out enforcement campaign on Luciano and his mob. Anslinger, and his trusted FBN agents pursued Luciano with determination until the mobster’s death. White and Garland Williams were two of the first agents tasked with hunting him down, but they never did manage to send him to prison again. Their pursuit was eventually taken over by Charles Siragusa.

In 1947, White followed Luciano to Havana, where he reported on Luciano's movements. FBN agents, already stationed in Cuba, received information from informants on their payroll, including a hotel elevator operator and a telephone operator at the Hotel Nacional. These sources provided surveillance on activity in Luciano’s suite on the eighth floor and in the adjacent room occupied by Frank Sinatra on the floor below. In a report to Anslinger, White noted that during Luciano’s stay in Havana, he hosted several prominent organized crime figures and entertainers. Guests reportedly included Frank Costello, Meyer Lansky, Ralph Capone, Rocco and Charlie Fischetti, and actors Frank Sinatra and Bruce Cabot. Another associate, Willie Moretti, was also said to be in Cuba at the time.

Due to concerns about legal repercussions from Frank Sinatra’s legal team, the New York World-Telegram required their journalist Robert Ruark to submit an internal memorandum outlining the basis of his reporting. Ruark stated that the general manager of the Hotel Nacional, Larry Larrea, had informed him that Sinatra was spending much of his time in the company of Luciano and a group of individuals known for their criminal associations. Larrea, reportedly disturbed by the company Sinatra was keeping, told Ruark that he avoided the hotel lobby altogether to prevent encountering the group.

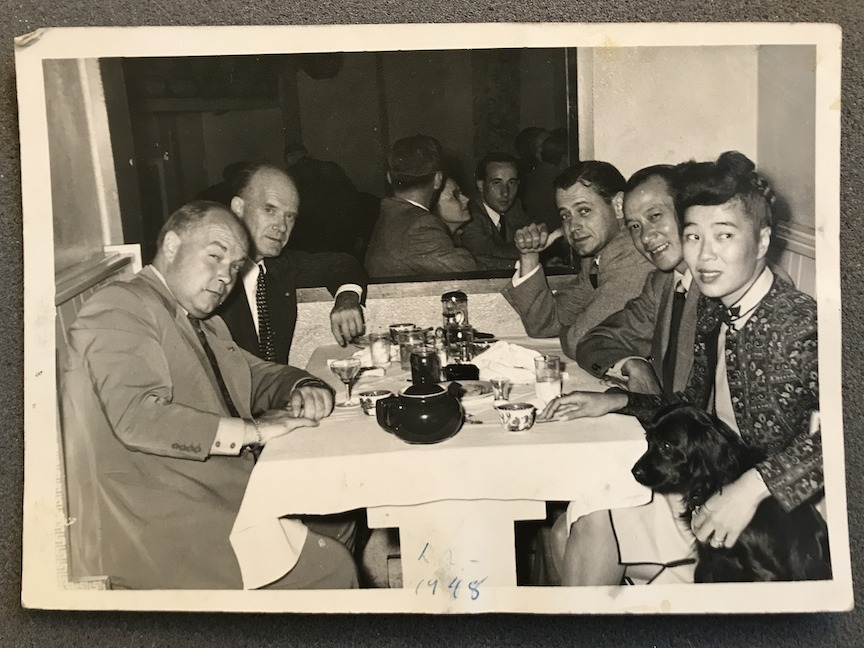
White (left) with a group of friends at dinner in California in 1948. White was at this time the FBN District Supervisor of the San Francisco office. Lana Wong, a famous SF celebrity, most likely taken at the Forbidden City.

White also investigated other branches of the Italian Mafia, Iranian and Middle Eastern crime families, the French Connection in Marseilles, and other European drug smuggling networks.

When the District Supervisor of Detroit, Ralph Oyer, died suddenly, White was sent there to take over the office. White was also around this time made responsible for managing the FBN districts of Illinois, Wisconsin, Indiana, Michigan, and Ohio.

In 1948, White was made the District Supervisor of the San Francisco FBN office. He worked in this capacity until 1950.

=== The Turkish Trap ===
On May 1, 1948, White began a tour through the Middle East and Europe, visiting Iran, Iraq, Lebanon, Turkey, France, and Italy. His primary objective was to reconnect with former OSS contacts and lay the groundwork for future FBN operations in the region. In France, White helped local police capture a narcotics trafficker, Lucien Santoni. In Rome, he compiled evidence against the heroin ring of Marcello Enzi.

However, White focused particular attention on Turkey and Iran, which he identified as the two principal sources of opium in the area.

When White arrived in Iran, he was travelling with Garland H. Williams. Both men reported back what they called grave conditions from Tehran. They observed that opium addiction was widespread, affecting an estimated 10 percent of the city's population, and spanning a broad cross-section of Iranian society regardless of age or class. Opium was widely consumed, particularly through smoking, and there was minimal regulation of its production or export. The agents noted significant quantities being transported across Iran’s western border with Turkey and through ports along the Persian Gulf.

White and Williams also reported the involvement of elite circles in the trade, with reports indicating that even members of the royal family, including relatives of the Shah, benefited financially from the opium economy. While Iranian officials assured White and Williams that public opium consumption had been banned and that poppy cultivation had previously been prohibited due to U.S. pressure, enforcement remained inconsistent. In 1949, the Iranian government reversed its prohibition on opium cultivation, citing the fiscal importance of taxing the trade. This decision strained relations with both the United States and international drug control bodies, prompting more robust diplomatic engagement. Eventually, following the political upheaval that led to the overthrow of Prime Minister Mohammed Mossadegh and a renegotiation of oil revenues in favor of the Iranian state, the government reinstated a nationwide ban on poppy cultivation.

While most of Iran's opium production was consumed domestically, White described Istanbul as the key transit hub for both opium and heroin, calling it potentially the “hot spot of the world” for drug trafficking.

Turkey had emerged as a key strategic partner for the United States in the early Cold War era. The Truman Doctrine, which pledged American support to countries facing authoritarian threats, was initially directed toward supporting Greece and Turkey against Soviet influence. Inspired by the modernizing vision of Mustafa Kemal Atatürk, Turkey actively pursued closer ties with the West and became a significant beneficiary of Marshall Plan assistance. Efforts by the Turkish government to regulate opium production faced significant challenges. Although cultivation was officially licensed and intended to be conducted through state-sanctioned channels, enforcement was largely ineffective. Istanbul had already emerged as a hub for illicit heroin production by the 1930s. According to later U.S. accounts, Turkish leader Mustafa Kemal Atatürk reportedly intervened directly to shut down illegal processing facilities after pressure from American officials, including, and most especially Harry Anslinger. In 1933, in response to international pressure from the United States and the League of Nations, Turkey established a state-controlled opium monopoly under the Toprak Mahsulleri Ofisi (Soil Products Office), which was tasked with purchasing the national opium harvest for legal export. However, government purchase prices remained low compared to those offered by the black market. As a result, many farmers chose to sell their crops to local dealers or traffickers instead. These local networks, particularly those based in Istanbul, were well-positioned to tap into regional smuggling routes and connect with the broader Atlantic heroin trade.

During his time in Istanbul, White adopted a covert persona, posing as a criminal along the city’s waterfront in an attempt to gather intelligence. His physical appearance, described by one associate as resembling a “beer keg,” contributed to his undercover role. White believed that his unpolished, foreign demeanor would make him less likely to be seen as a law enforcement figure, noting that he appeared too wealthy, too unfamiliar with the language, and generally unfit for a police role. When this independent approach yielded no useful information, he enlisted an interpreter from the U.S. consulate and began collaborating with the local police, who allowed him to participate in ongoing investigations.

White was advised by Turkish police to locate Vasil Arcan, a local figure listed in FBN files as the owner of a bar frequented by merchant seamen known to procure small amounts of narcotics. Although Arcan’s establishment, The Piccadilly, was temporarily shuttered, White eventually found him and persuaded him to assist in arranging a large heroin purchase.

The next day, Arcan introduced White to two traffickers, Iradodos Terapyanos and Yasef Kariyo, who led him via a deliberately convoluted route meant to avoid detection to a stash house. After receiving a sample and discussing prices, White and the traffickers agreed to meet again that afternoon to finalize the deal. Before leaving, White discreetly recorded the serial number from a gas meter at the location. He then returned with Istanbul detective Namik Karayel to organize a raid. To maintain cover, Turkish police disguised themselves as sailors, soldiers, postal workers, and laborers. In an elaborate ruse, some officers even began digging up the street outside the house.

At the appointed time, White rejoined the suspects and entered the building armed with a borrowed revolver and a blackjack. He was instructed to signal the police by breaking a window once the heroin and money were visible. After revealing his identity and attempting to break the window, the noise failed to draw attention due to the surrounding commotion. In frustration, White hurled a chair through the window to alert the waiting officers. The signal worked, the disguised police force stormed the house and apprehended the suspects. The operation resulted in the seizure of three kilograms of heroin valued at $6,000, with additional quantities bringing the total haul to roughly fifteen kilograms. The incident received significant media attention both in Turkey and the United States. White’s estimate of the seizure's street value at one million dollars helped generate the headlines the FBN was seeking.

Matthew R. Pembleton writes:

The story quickly became part of FBN lore and was retold (with dramatic embellishment) in a variety of radio programs, dime-store novels, and true-crime magazines. White’s globetrotting escapades even inspired the movie To the Ends of the Earth (1948), starring Dick Powell and featuring a cameo from Anslinger. One of the central themes in the film was that drug control trumped national sovereignty, an idea nicely illustrated by the image of White brandishing his U.S. badge at Turkish citizens. Turkish accounts, however, portrayed the case in a rather different light. Most noted that Arcan was already under investigation and that two heroin laboratories were uncovered prior to the agent’s arrival. The Son Telegraph gave full credit to the Turkish police and cast White in a supportive role. The Yeni Sabah was indignant that Western accounts “made a hero of the American detective,” something the Son Posta chalked up to chauvinism on the part of the Associated Press.

Due to the negative press they had received inside of Turkey, the FBN was not allowed to return an agent to Turkey for a full year, until they finally granted access to Garland Williams.

During his short visit to Istanbul, White had also worked to establish connections with local figures. Among those he encountered was Rıza Çandır, a journalist with prior experience as an informant for the OSS and known to have links to criminal networks in Turkey. While White did not mention this meeting in his official report to Commissioner Harry Anslinger, other sources suggest that he also met with Kemal Aygün, who would later become the head of the Istanbul branch of the Genel Emmiyet Müdürlüğü.

=== The death of Abraham Davidan (1950) ===
On March 3, 1950, White was interviewed by the FBI during their investigation into the death of Abraham Davidian. White stated that several months earlier, Davidian had approached his office in San Francisco, offering to provide information about a large narcotics ring. Davidian also sought assistance from the Federal Bureau of Narcotics in relation to an arrest made by state authorities in March 1949. White reported that he had attempted to delay the California prosecution of Davidian in order to use him as an informant in an investigation targeting Joseph Sica. At the time of his death, Davidian was considered a key witness in a federal narcotics case. The interview suggested White was cooperating with federal authorities. However, FBI files indicated friction between federal and state narcotics agencies, stemming from White’s request to the chief of the California Division of Narcotic Enforcement to postpone the state case against Davidian. The request was denied, and White reportedly viewed the response from the state Attorney General's office as entirely uncooperative.

A redacted source speculated that Davidian's death may have been linked to political tensions in California, particularly a dispute over procedure between George White and the head of the State Narcotics Bureau. The individual suggested that the California Attorney General’s office might have been compromised and that the State Narcotics Bureau feared possible repercussions if Davidian were to provide information to federal authorities that implicated certain state officials.

Another FBI source suggested that White had killed Davidan himself. On October 10, 1951, [redacted], located in Fresno, California, informed FBI agents that he believed Colonel George White was responsible for the death of Davidian. He stated this belief was based on his personal experience, alleging that White had attempted to negotiate a deal with him at the time of his own arrest. According to [redacted], White sought his cooperation to testify against other narcotics traffickers in exchange for a reduced sentence. However, further questioning revealed that [redacted] had no concrete evidence to support his claim. He acknowledged that his allegation was based solely on personal suspicion rather than verifiable information.

=== The Kefavauer Committee ===
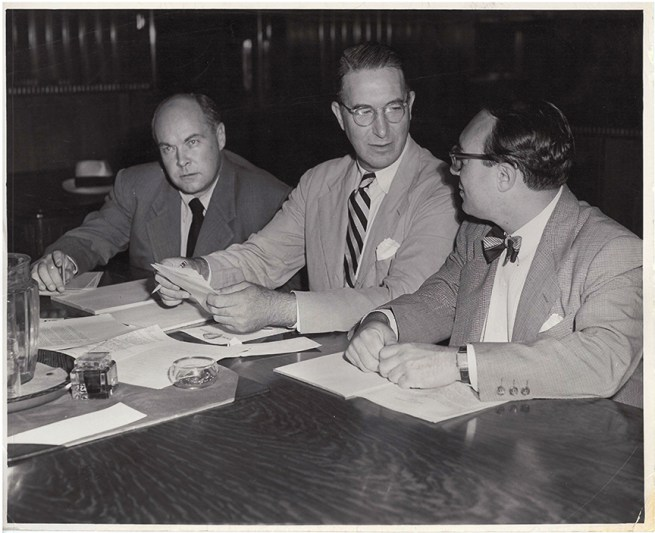
In 1950, White was employed by the Kefauver Committee to investigate organized crime. Estes Kefauver (center) confers with chief counsel Rudolph Halley (right) during Senate crime committee hearings in the city of St. Louis.

In the year 1949, the only major federal law enforcement official who even believed in the idea of an internationally coordinated and interwoven mafia present in the United States was Harry Anslinger. The Director of the FBI, J. Edgar Hoover, did not even believe that such a coordinated mafia existed. Hoover thought that these were merely individual gangs and hoodlums who might know each other, but were certainly not all members of the same secret families or had taken the same blood oaths. To the majority of the law enforcement community, Ansliger was thought of as crazy for believing in this theory of a mafia. When the "Kefauver Committee" asked for special investigators, Anslinger sent two of his best men to the committee: George White and Charlie Siragusa.

In 1950, White was brought in to work for U.S. Senators Estes Kefauver and Herbert O'Conor, and the United States Senate Special Committee to Investigate Crime in Interstate Commerce to investigate organized crime in the United States and corruption in the government. However, according to the FBI, who also had men serving as special investigators for the committee, White proved remarkably ineffective here, and the members questioned his status as an investigator. They had assumed him to be a competent man, but his erratic behavior caused great confusion at the committee.

During the course of the Committee's work, the Republican New Hampshire Senator Charles W. Tobey was issued a death threat over the telephone. White was made Tobey's bodyguard for a large duration of the investigations, driving the Senator in an unmarked police car between New York and New Hampshire.

It was not until the committee deposed White himself on March 15, 1951, that they fully understood why he was ineffective in his investigations: he was too closely connected to them. During the session held in New York City, White described his extensive background in criminal investigations related to narcotics, both domestically and internationally. He explained that during the war, he held the rank of Lieutenant Colonel and was assigned to the OSS, where he was responsible for counterespionage training and later for operational assignments in India and select regions of the United States. He also recounted in vivid detail his associations with August Del Gracio, and his part in securing Lucky Luciano his ability to walk out of prison. Among his postwar assignments, White recounted his mission to Turkey, where he worked with local authorities to suppress the production and distribution of narcotics at their source. His testimony also included detailed commentary on the trafficking and use of narcotics, informed by his firsthand interactions with individuals involved in the illicit drug trade.

An FBI agent later wrote in an official memorandum to the Director of the FBI, D.M. Ladd:

On March 25, 1952, former Special Agent Robert Collier, Chief Investigator for the House Judiciary Subcommittee, confidentially advised the Bureau that White had been found very unsatisfactory by the Kefauver Committee, and that they had used him for only a couple of months. The Committee, according to Collier, said that White's services had been so unsatisfactory and caused so much confusion, they released him and sent him back to the Narcotics Bureau.

The cited reason for his dismissal was the disclosure of classified information, that White had leaked to the press. He also encountered the spurn of President Truman, after White insinuated that the President had corrupt ties during White's investigation in Kansas City. White also made enemies of New York Governor Thomas Dewey, when he alleged that the governor had released Lucky Luciano from prison in exchange for a major campaign contribution.

However, the primary reason for White's removal from the committee was his inability to work with others – primarily the head of the Buffalo city investigation, a career federal prosecutor named Robinson. Robinson had expressed discontent in the funds that had been allocated to him for his investigations, and at his lack of manpower. After having organized the Kansas City commission, White was sent to aid Robinson as manpower per the request. Almost as soon as White arrived in Buffalo, the two men went at loggerheads. White began making public press statements without clearing them through Robinson, and conducting investigations on his own. Robinson's vision for the commission also clashed greatly with White.

=== Newbold Morris investigation (1952) ===
In April 1952, White was then again reassigned to work with Newbold Morris, a presidentially appointed special counsel investigating corruption within the U.S. government. White’s transfer reportedly required direct intervention from President Harry S. Truman, as the Treasury Department was initially reluctant to release him. His appointment was specifically requested by Morris, who had received recommendations from New York associates familiar with White’s prior work in dismantling organized crime operations.

As part of Morris’s investigation, White was expected to examine connections between criminal enterprises and public officials. He was provided office space within a 20,000-square-foot government facility and had access to a $550,000 allocation from the President’s executive fund. Plans called for a staff of up to 200 administrative and investigative personnel to support the effort. White’s reputation for independence and thoroughness generated concern in some government circles, where officials reportedly feared exposure of corrupt ties. Labor organizations, particularly the Congress of Industrial Organizations (CIO), viewed the probe as an opportunity to address long-standing concerns about organized crime’s influence over unions and local politics.

In New Jersey, where labor leaders had previously supported local initiatives modeled on the Kefauver hearings, the Essex–West Hudson CIO Council announced a series of proposals aimed at increasing government transparency. These included measures requiring municipal officials to publicly disclose their income, sources of funding, and total assets. The council also urged state CIO leadership to advocate for similar legislation on a statewide level, with the expectation that these efforts would expand nationally.

According to Joel Jacobson, executive secretary of the local CIO council, the initiative aimed to complicate the ability of organized crime to infiltrate public institutions. “We know it’s practically impossible to stop all corruption,” he stated, “but we want to make it difficult for the racketeers to influence local government. Then, if it can be stopped nationally, swell — we’ve won a little in this fight to keep the syndicates from dominating business and labor in this land of ours.”

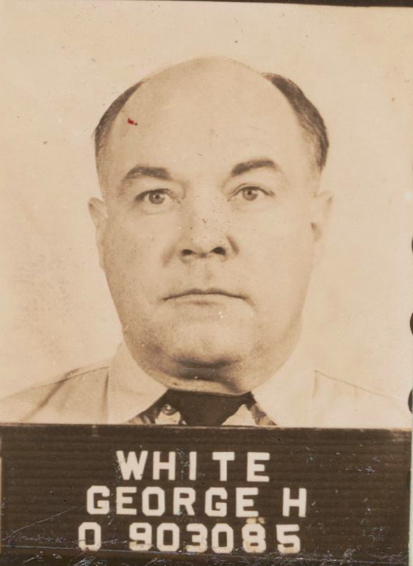
In 1952, White was arrested and jailed for two hours on a contempt of court charge after he refused to reveal the identity of his confidential informant in the criminal prosecution of Tommy Lucchese.

On December 5, 1952, White was held in contempt of court by the United States District Court judge David N. Eddlestein, for refusing to release the name of his confidential informant in the criminal prosecution case of Tommy Lucchese. He was arrested and jailed for two hours. On December 8, White managed to purge himself of the contempt charge after a jury found that his answers had been satisfactory.

=== Houston Police Department (1954) ===
In 1954, White was summoned to investigate corruption within the Houston Police Department. During a conversation with a detective of this department, White shot and killed the detective. White initiated drug-related charges against nearly the entire Houston Police Department. Another officer, Martin Albert Billnitzer, died on June 3, 1954, the morning after an interrogation by White and fellow agent Henry Giordano. Officially ruled a suicide, Bilnitzer had reportedly confessed on tape to mishandling confiscated narcotics and implicated other officers. However, White privately suspected foul play. Most people did: Bilitzner had two gunshots to the heart and one in the head, which was noted as suspicious during government investigations in the 1970's.

After the incident, the Chief of Police, Lawrence Donald "L.D." Morrison, relieved police Captain Foy Melton of duty and fired police Detective Sidney Smith.

The incident led to considerable controversy. Chief Morrison was also officially discovered and charged to be addicted to cocaine, and the resulting scandal reached as high as the Secretary of the Treasury, the Attorney General, and FBI Director J. Edgar Hoover. Morrison resigned his post and took up duties as a demoted Inspector. The Federal Bureau of Narcotics’ senior officer in Houston, who had publicly defended the local police and criticized White's tactics, was recalled and later reassigned to the New York office before retirement. According to a CIA interview with FBN agent George Gaffney, he had long harbored doubts about the suicide ruling, and also believed the death may have resulted from psychological pressure and intimidation during the interrogation, especially by White.

=== Ludwig Braumoeller (1955-1957) ===
In 1955, in San Francisco, White conducted a major sting operation against the California Bureau of Narcotics that exposed state narcotics agent Ludwig "Frank" Braumoeller for selling drugs seized in raids to known criminals, leading to Braumoeller's arrest.

This caused an increasing and escalating discord between the two agencies. After several weeks, Ben Swig, foreman of the San Francisco Grand Jury, publicly urged the state's Attorney General to take decisive action. In October 1957, California Attorney General Edmund G. Brown announced a new policy aimed at resolving ongoing tensions between state and federal narcotics enforcement agencies. Under the new plan, state narcotics officers would be assigned to assist on certain federal investigations, while federal agents were to be integrated into selected state-level cases. The arrangement was reached through cooperation among Brown, Walter Creighton (head of the California Narcotics Bureau), and George White.

When he was first arrested, Braumoeller told reporters that he had been set-up and framed by the FBN. He also claimed that his arrest was spurned on by White's involvement in the death of a man named Abraham Davidan. Braumoeller eventually did plead guilty, however, to selling heroin to a known drug addict. Ludwig Frederick Braumoeller was officially pardoned by President John F. Kennedy in 1963.

In 1956, White championed the cause of convicted school teacher Robert Enzensperger, who had been falsely accused of transporting marijuana. His investigation resulted in the teacher's release and exoneration.

That same year, he led a heroin seizure operation in San Francisco, which resulted in the imprisonment of Rinaldo (Red) Ferrari for narcotics trafficking.

In 1959, White was detained by the United States Coast Guard near Alcatraz Island for allegedly shooting a pistol in a restricted area while he was aboard his fishing vessel, the "Little Giant." The Coast Guard towed his boat to shore and kept it impounded, writing a sternly worded letter of complaint to Commissioner Anslinger.

White continued to voice his opposition to marijuana use. Testifying before a Senate subcommittee in 1959, he advocated for greater cooperation with Mexican authorities and harsher penalties for drug offenders.

=== Death of Billie Holiday ===
In 1949, White was informed that the famous jazz singer Billie Holiday was staying at the Mark Twain Hotel in San Francisco. Arriving without a search warrant on a rainy day, White and his team claimed to have discovered opium in a wastepaper basket and drug paraphernalia in her hotel room. Holiday, dressed in white silk pajamas, strongly denied the accusations, insisting she had been drug-free for over a year. Doubts about the arrest emerged soon after. The placement of the alleged narcotics in a wastebasket raised suspicion, and the heroin kit cited by the agents was never formally entered into evidence, but they later claimed it had been left at the scene. When asked by reporters about the inconsistencies, White's response was reportedly evasive and defensive.

Despite the arrest, White attended Holiday’s performance that evening at Café Society Uptown and requested his preferred songs. Holiday, committed to her music and public integrity, expressed confidence that her artistry would endure beyond the persecution she faced. She is reported to have said, “They’ll remember me when all this is gone.” Holiday maintained that the drugs had been planted by White’s team and immediately volunteered to enter a clinic to prove her sobriety. According to Lady Day’s Diary by Ken Vail, she admitted herself at personal expense and exhibited no withdrawal symptoms during observation, which she presented as evidence of her innocence.

Holiday represented herself in her criminal trial, "The United States of America versus Billie Holiday."

In 1959, when Holiday collapsed and was rushed to the hospital, doctors informed her that her continued use of heroin was causing her health to decline. The FBN arrived and claimed they found more narcotics in her possession. Doctors attempted to detox her with methadone, but the FBN interrupted the process; they also refused to let her see a lawyer. She died on the hospital bed that she was handcuffed to.

== MK Ultra and the Manhattan experiments ==
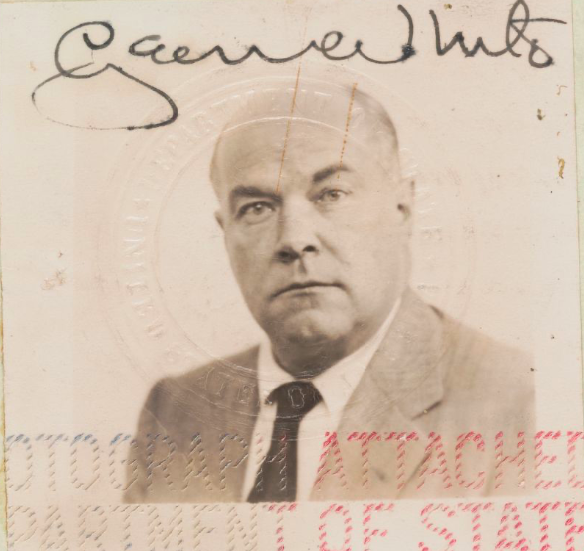
George Hunter White's official passport photo from his renewed 1952 "special passport," issued November 12, 1952

White's other activities have been overshadowed by his involvement in the United States government's second official effort at creating a mind control drug, which was called MKUltra. The OSS had abandoned its research during WW2, and White had also seemingly ended his own experiments after the war. However, with the rise of the Cold War and into the 1950s, the United States and the Soviet Union became locked in a global struggle for intelligence dominance. The two sides were in an arms race, each developing sinister plots and devices to be used for espionage and warfare.

In 1951, Allen Dulles received incorrect intelligence that the Soviet Union had purchased 50 million doses of a new drug from the Swiss pharmaceutical company Sandoz Pharmaceuticals, called LSD. In reality, Sandoz had produced only about 40 grams of LSD since Albert Hofmann first discovered its psychoactive properties in the 1940s. The U.S. military attaché in Switzerland had confused milligrams with kilograms, overestimating the available supply by a factor of one million. Due to this error, Dulles became convinced that the USSR was incredibly close at developing a mind control drug.

Dulles assembled a top-level group of intelligence and military officials to address growing concerns that the Soviet Union might gain access to LSD. The committee concluded that the CIA should secure the entire known supply of the drug to prevent it from falling into Soviet hands. Two officers were sent to Switzerland with a briefcase containing $240,000 to negotiate the purchase. The CIA proceeded with an agreement to obtain all of Sandoz’s future LSD production. Later, when the Eli Lilly Company in the United States developed a method to synthesize LSD independently, the agency arranged a similar exclusive agreement. An internal CIA memorandum to Dulles optimistically reported that the agency would soon have access to "tonnage quantities" of the substance. With the supply secured, officials were left to determine how best to use it in ongoing research and covert operations.

Early research was conducted under the MK-Ultra program, much of it taking place within academic institutions. Eventually, the testing expanded beyond university settings into covert, urban operations. According to an agency memo, the CIA feared KGB agents might use psychedelics “to produce anxiety or terror in medically unsophisticated subjects unable to distinguish drug-induced psychosis from actual insanity."

White was contacted by the CIA chemist Dr. Sidney Gottlieb who was working at the CIA's Office of Technical Service, at that time not yet elevated to Office status, it was known as the Technical Services Section (TSS). Gottlieb was the director of the TSS's Chemical Division (CD). The TSS was the successor to Stan Lovell's old R&A branch at OSS, and therefore Gottlieb had access to all of Lovell's old notes and experiments from the T-drug experiments during the war. White's name came up in these notes, and Gottlieb had decided to recruit White back into the mind control search. In this operation, Gottlieb and White gave experimental drugs such as LSD to unknowing American citizens in New York and San Francisco to observe their behavior.

The operation was given the name Operation Midnight Climax, whose mission intention was more or less what its name implies: observing people high on LSD while they performed sexual activities. (It is still unknown the extent to which White was involved in several other MK Ultra and MK Search operations like Project Artichoke and Project Bluebird.)

In 1953, the CIA rented an apartment at 81 Bedford Street in New York City's Greenwich Village, which was known as a "swinging" part of town at the time. The lease was under the name Morgan Hall, which was a cover identity for White. White outfitted the apartment as a surveillance site, installing two-way mirrors and audio recording devices. Disguised as an artist and sailor, he invited individuals back to the apartment where they were given LSD, sometimes knowingly, sometimes without their consent, while their reactions were secretly observed and documented. Individuals were lured into the apartment under the pretense of social gatherings or parties, and were then surreptitiously administered drugs.

Richard Statton writes:

In an effort to school “enlightened operatives" for that eventuality, Dulles and Gottlieb instructed high-ranking agency personnel, including Gottlieb’s entire staff at TSS, to take LSD themselves and administer it to their colleagues.

“There was an extensive amount of self-experimentation for the reason that we felt that a firsthand knowledge of the subjective effects of these drugs [was] important to those of us who were involved in the program," Gottlieb explained at a Senate Subcommittee hearing years later. In truth, CIA spooks and scientists were tripping their brains out. “I didn’t want to leave it," one CIA agent said of his first LSD trip. “I felt I would be going back to a place where I wouldn’t be able to hold on to this kind of beauty."

But as covert LSD experiments proliferated, things down at CIA headquarters began to get out of hand.

Regarding his own experiments with consuming drugs and narcotics, White wrote:

"I was used as a guinea pig many times. My personal observation was that the effect of all of these drugs was essentially the same, except for the degree or extent of the effect. THCA was more potent than marihuana [sic] and LSD more potent than THCA. So far as I was concerned, 'clear thinking' was non-existent while under the influence of any of these drugs. I did feel at times I was having a 'mind-expanding' experience but this vanished like a dream immediately after the session.”

To carry out these activities, White immersed himself in the city’s underground social scene, associating with writers, sex workers, and individuals on the fringes of society. Prostitutes were reportedly employed to discreetly introduce drug-laced beverages to test subjects, though White himself was also known to administer the substances directly. The soft core erotica fiction writer Gill Fox said:

"I knew George well. Extremely well, in a strange way. George was into high heels. That was his major fetish, and we met through John Willie. Willie was putting out a little magazine called Bizarre that featured women in high heels, and White liked it. He liked my books too, and he asked me to write about high heels. Later I did a semi-analysis of him. As a child, White had been infatuated with an aunt who wore high heels. He was an interesting guy with a sensitive side. He loved to hold and pet little birds, like canaries. But he was a gin drunk. He drank morning noon and night. At parties he would prepare two pitchers of martinis, one for everyone else, and one for himself. He was playing out his sexual fantasies too. One time Pat and I went with him to see his hooker girlfriend at a hotel. She tied him up and strapped him to the bed and whipped his ass. She had on high heels."

Numerous individuals, including friends, colleagues, and even other government personnel, were exposed to these drug trials. White was known to have administered LSD to acquaintances ranging from civilians to fellow agents. One incident involved a woman named Linda King, who was allegedly dosed by White in September 1953 and subsequently required hospitalization. In another reported case from the same period, CIA personnel claimed that White drugged an agency office worker, causing an acute psychological reaction.

In the late 1970's, the CIA established a Victims Task Force for those people unknowingly given LSD during these experiments, managed by CIA officer Frank Laubinger. Laubinger did not have any direct evidence for most of the victims, as Gottlieb had burned most of his files. But he reached out to dozens of victims, telling them that it was "highly likely" that they had been victims of George Hunter White. After the task force was established, these victims described their events in letters sent to the CIA. One of them was a woman named Clarice Stein, a co-worker of White's wife at Abraham & Strauss.

== Albertine "Tine" Calef ==
While his first two marriages had ended in disaster, White eventually met Albertine Calef, or Tine for short. Tine was a department store clothing buyer from Brooklyn, who was born in New York to Egyptian Jewish parents and was widely described as sociable and spirited. In interviews conducted later in her life, she recalled White with fondness, praising his punctuality, storytelling abilities, passion for nonfiction reading, and writing skills. She portrayed him as a principled liberal Democrat who avoided confrontation and physical intimidation.

They were married on August 18, 1951.

Tine was a social climber, knowing that White was her ticket into many of the important backrooms of Manhattan's social circle. Some accounts suggest that Tine may have overlooked or dismissed aspects of White's more controversial conduct. The couple lived together in a Greenwich Village apartment at 59 West 12th Street and maintained social connections with a wide range of prominent individuals, including public officials and artists. According to the investigative author Douglas Valentine, Tine appeared emotionally invested in her husband's memory and lifestyle, and reacted strongly, using profane language, when asked about an incident involving a woman named Barbara Smithe and the use of LSD on January 11, 1953. The interviewer noted that Tine's reaction raised the possibility that she may have been aware of or complicit in some of White's more questionable activities, though no direct evidence was provided.

It was often at social functions with Tine that White would dose his houseguests, as was noted in White's FBI investigation files.

== The death of Frank Olson (1953) ==
In 1953, as the FBN field director of Midnight Climax, White was assigned custodianship of U.S. government employee Frank Olson at the Statler Hotel in New York City, who was a subject of the experiments. However, White's mother started getting sick and was hospitalized at the time, so White had to immediately fly back to California to care for her. During his absence from Manhattan, White entrusted supervision of Olson to his trusted aide and former confidential informant, Jacques Voignier, a high ranking member in Union Corse and white collar criminal who often did contract work for the US government. Voignier was under his favorite assumed alias as "Jean Pierre Lafitte," which was a name he had chosen to honor two French pirates, and was officially employed at the hotel as a bellhop under this alias. Another alias the CIA knew him as was "The Pirate."

Voignier, acting as Jean Pierre Lafitte, had used his extensive criminal networks to help White secure the money needed to rent out the Bedford Street apartment.

White did not know that Voignier had invited his childhood friend, a man named Frank Spirito, the head of the Union Corse crime family and the French Connection, to the room that night. Spirito had just been released from a two year stint in federal prison. White did not know that Spirito had entered the room, nor did he know that Spirito and Voignier got into a fist fight that night, while Olson was passed-out on the mattress from a cocktail of narcotics and drugs.

After Olson woke up from his drugged stupor, Olson fell from a window and died. To this day, it is unknown if Olson was accidentally elbowed during the fight between the two men, if he was pushed, or if he was so high that he thought he could fly. During Senate testimony in 1977, the CIA claimed the latter, that Olson had been driven to suicidal ideation by the narcotics and drugs he had been exposed to. To their credit, in the 10 days since Olson had first been dosed with LSD, his mood had increasingly soured and he had become increasingly paranoid. Whatever the reason for Olson's fall from the window, he was under the care of the US government at the time. One man who was not with Olson when he died was Robert Lashbrook, although his name was on the hotel bill, and he did identify the body for the police when they arrived. Lashbrook was one of Gottlieb's deputies at CIA, and only occasionally visited White's experimental subjects. Olson's death began to open public scrutiny into the MKUltra program, but it was not until 1977 that the program became fully known to the public or lawmakers. However, a few reporters and elected representatives were asking questions about Olson's death, and the CIA feared where they would lead.

Jacques Voignier was immediately relocated to Tampa Bay, Florida, before being sent to Cuba to investigate the French Connection and the rise of communism in Cuba. Spirito was immediately deported back to France, on the charge that he had entered the country illegally, where he continued to be involved in the illegal narcotics trade.

In 1953, the FBI began investigating White's activities in New York. They managed to infiltrate one of their own informants into the White's operation, who managed to smuggle out two samples of drugs that the CIA were using in New York. FBI headquarters had the samples analyzed, and noted that the first sample "was found to contain a fairly concentrated solution of chloral hydrate, which is a sedative and hypnotic." The second sample "was found to contain a very small amount of an organic material in a dilute solution of sodium chloride or ordinary table salt. This preparation was most probably prepared for injection by the use of a syringe and hypodermic needle." The FBI informant reported White's codename as Morgan Hall, noted how much he had spent on the apartment, noted that the CIA was experimenting with truth drugs and knock-out drugs, and was attempting to find a method for mind control. The FBI was fully aware of these activities by the end of 1953, and they knew exactly what was in the drugs, but White was allowed to continue. The Director of the FBI merely stated that he wanted to be kept apprised of any new developments.

White requested to return to San Francisco so he could take charge of his mother's estate. Gottlieb and Anslinger agreed to the move.

The apartment complex at Bedford Street was also immediately sold to two unassuming women, but the CIA did not end their experiments in New York. While White was moving to San Francisco, the CIA rented-out another apartment at 105 West 13th Street. Similar to earlier safe houses established in New York and later in San Francisco, the apartment on 13th Street served multiple purposes for White and his associates. Although primarily used for CIA-linked drug experiments, it also functioned as a venue for gatherings, including celebrations, such as one for the FBN's successful dismantling of the French Connection. Officially, the apartment was said to belong to a man involved in the import-export business. According to narcotics agents who visited the site, it was carefully staged to resemble the residence of a well-traveled international businessman. Declassified CIA records indicate that the 13th Street apartment remained active until 1966.

== Midnight Climax and relocation to San Francisco ==
In March 1955, White was officially reassigned to the FBN San Francisco office, and brought Operation Midnight Climax with him. One of White's initial actions was to establish a $3,000 personal bank account under the alias Morgan Hall. He used the money to set up a covert safe house at 225 Chestnut Street on Telegraph Hill, where he resumed his involvement in drug-related experiments linked to earlier CIA operations.

The building's landlord at the time was Godfrey K. Walters. His nephew, Sandy Walters, had once been informed that the apartment was being used for undercover work by the government. As a child, Sandy was upset that there weren't any shootouts or big arrests that happened in the building.

By June 1955, White had outfitted the apartment with surveillance equipment, including two-way mirrors, microphones, and other electronic monitoring devices, some cleverly concealed within the electrical outlets. The interior décor was deliberately provocative, featuring images of women in bondage and erotic prints by French artist Henri de Toulouse-Lautrec, intended to encourage sexual activity. The walls also featured animal skins, and the furniture was draped with black velveteen. The bay windows were covered with yellow draperies.

The apartment, shaped in an L and offering expansive views of the San Francisco waterfront, was located just uphill from the lively saloons and bars of North Beach. It served as a covert operations site where sex workers, compensated through government funds, were tasked with bringing clients to the location. Once inside, the individuals were unknowingly given drinks laced with LSD, while undercover agents observed their behavior through a two-way mirror. The layout of the apartment allowed for close, concealed observation, especially via a two-way mirror positioned in the bedroom.

White also made a deal with the San Francisco Police Department: if they arrested or apprehended any prostitute, that person would be released if White asked. The police didn't ask any questions. These sex workers were known to the SFPD as "George's Girls."

White also enlisted another FBN agent to pose as a pimp and recruit sex workers who were struggling with addiction for use in the experiments. This agent, reportedly fluent in multiple languages, including Chinese, Russian, French, German, and Italian, was able to move easily among San Francisco's diverse communities. The name of this agent was Ira “Ike” C. Feldman. One of Feldman's codenames at the time was in honor of the French artist whose paintings hung on the walls of the apartment: Toulouse Lautrec. However, on the street his alias was Joe Capone.

Richard Stratton wrote:

Posing as Joe Capone, junk dealer and pimp, Feldman infiltrated the seamy North Beach criminal demimonde. “I always wanted to be a gangster," Feldman told me. “So I was good at it. Before long, I had half a dozen girls working for me. One day, White calls me into his office. ‘Ike,’ he says, ‘you’ve been doing one hell of a job as an undercover man. Now I’m gonna give you another assignment. We want you to test these mind-bending drugs.’ I said, ‘Why the hell do you want to test mind-bending drugs?’ He said, ‘Have you ever heard of The Manchurian Candidate?’ I know about The Manchurian Candidate. In fact, I read the book. ‘Well,’ White said, ‘that’s why we have to test these drugs, to find out if they can be used to brainwash people.’ He says, ‘If we can find out just how good this stuff works, you’ll be doing a great deal for your country.’"

Feldman's story about this conversation does not match the series of events, however, since the novel was released in 1959, and Feldman was hired by white in the mid-1950's.

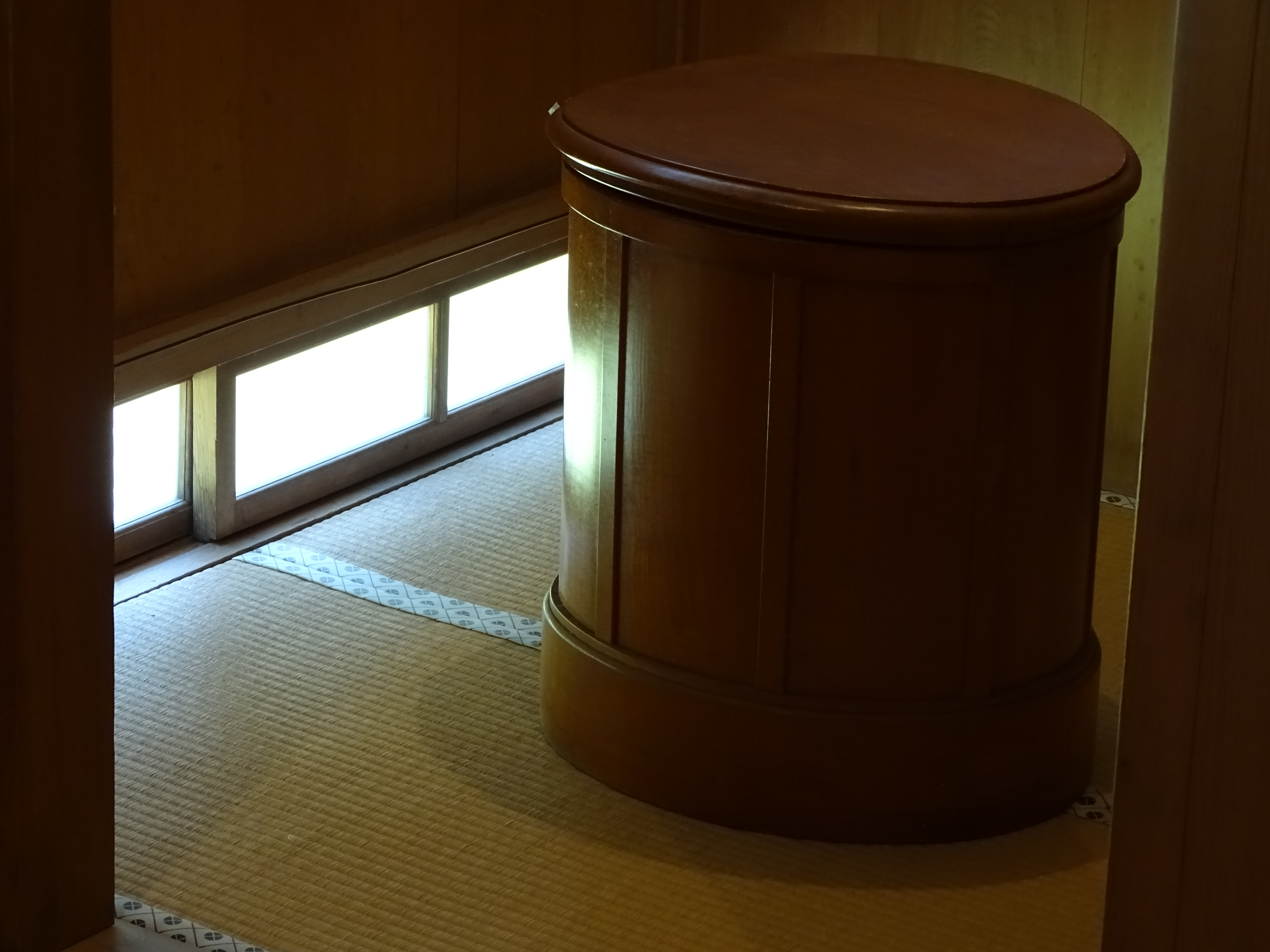
This wooden portable toilet is similar to the plastic one used by George Hunter White while observing subjects in the San Francisco apartment on Telegraph Hill. White referred to his portable toilet as his "observation post."

The apartment soon took on an atmosphere more reminiscent of a fraternity house than a formal research facility. According to White’s own journal entries, agents frequently indulged in “eight-martini lunches,” blending leisure with surveillance activities. On occasion, White even observed the ongoing experiments while seated on a portable toilet gifted to him by a friend, which he humorously referred to as his “observation post.”

The San Francisco Weekly writes: "What happened at the pad, stayed at the pad.

Ruth Kelley, a singer performing at a San Francisco nightclub called The Black Sheep, reportedly became an unwitting subject in an LSD experiment while on stage. According to a later deposition by Frank Laubinger, (a CIA official involved in outreach to MK-ULTRA victims during the 1980s), Kelley, who had caught George White’s attention but declined his advances, was given LSD without her knowledge shortly before performing. The drug reportedly affected her during the act, and she was later hospitalized. She recovered fully once the effects wore off, though she had been unaware that she had been drugged.

In other cases, White and his wife hosted social gatherings where guests were allegedly given hallucinogenic substances without their knowledge. White also recorded in his diary instances where he surreptitiously administered LSD to individuals at public places; beaches, bars, and restaurants in San Francisco. Many of these subjects were targeted arbitrarily, simply because they happened to cross paths with White or his team.

The New York Times writes:

One longtime friend, who asked that he not be identified, recalled that while the C.I.A. experiments were under way Mr. White once showed him some glass ampules filled with a clear liquid that had come from a Swiss pharmaceutical concern. Mr. White, the friend said, told him that he had slipped some of the liquid into cocktails at a drinking session with two men of his acquaintance, but that it was “a minimal dose — he wouldn't try to poison his friends.”

The Telegraph Hill location was not the only "pad" that White and the FBN had purchased for their operation in San Francisco. There were at least two other pads located in the Bay Area. The first of these was at 261 Green Street in Mill Valley, and the other was in Room 49 of the Plantation Inn at the corner Lombard and Webster Street.

In 1956, Feldman used the Telegraph Hill apartment as a front for a major narcotics case. As a result, the CIA had determined that the location was burned, and no longer secure for ongoing drug experimentation, prompting the agency to relocate its operations to a more discreet site, a private residence in Mill Valley, California. The Mill Valley property was owned by Page Secor, a merchant marine officer with top-secret clearance who was under contract with the U.S. Navy. Secor later stated that he had no involvement with U.S. intelligence operations and that the house had been rented out in 1959 through a local real estate agent to George White, whom he claimed never to have met.

Upon returning from sea about a year later, Secor reported that neighbors described a series of raucous gatherings at the house, often involving men wearing shoulder holsters moving in and out of the property. Secor assumed the home had served as a recreational retreat for federal agents. His only personal grievance, he noted, was that White had left with some of his furniture when vacating the premises.

Following concerns about the remote location of the Mill Valley site, the CIA relocated its drug testing operations to the Plantation Inn, a modest motel situated in San Francisco’s Marina District, near the entrance to the Golden Gate Bridge. The agency had reportedly found the Mill Valley house too difficult to access for their purposes.

During this period, the Plantation Inn was owned by John E. Milonas, a well-known attorney in San Francisco. Milonas later stated that George White had rented rooms at the motel for several years, but that he had never questioned how they were being used. “He paid his rent,” Milonas recalled, offering no explanation for a cryptic entry in White’s personal diary dated October 19, 1961, which referenced a meeting of what White called the “civil liberties and rubber hose society” at the Plantation Inn.

Operation Midnight Climax remained active until 1965, when it was shut down amid growing concerns over its ethical and legal implications. The following year, in 1966, LSD was officially classified as an illegal substance in the United States.

=== Known Midnight Climax victims ===
- Barbara Smithe
- Valerie Smithe
- Clarice Stein Smithline
- Francine Kramer
- Gil and Pat Fox
- Kai Jurgenson
- Jo Jurgenson
- Linda King
- Herman Ginsberg and his wife Bobbie
- Ruth Kelly

== Retirement and later life ==
In 1966, White retired from the FBN. He wrote an autobiography entitled A Diet of Danger. The book was rejected by publishers. He became the chief of the Stinson Beach fire department, in Stinson Beach, California; nine years later, he died at age 67 from heart problems.

A few notable incidents occurred while White was living in retirement. Once, after inviting his elderly father to live with him, his house caught fire. White saved his father, but was unable to rescue his parrot. In another incident, four pot smokers sat down in front of his home and lit up in what he called a "pot party" – White called the SFPD and had them arrested. He kept tabs on them when they appeared in the news, cutting out their news articles and stashing them in his diaries. At the same time, he was still, as the author Douglas Valentine writes, "surrounded by deviants" until his death.

When he died, his wife donated all of his written material to Foothill College, when the CIA came in and classified many of the documents. The "George White Papers" were then used as evidence in subsequent Senate Intelligence committee hearings, and his diaries were used by the Victims Task Force to find names in order to settle with the victims of Midnight Climax. Foothill College later donated their boxes to the Perham Foundation. Eventually, the boxes wound up at Stanford University Libraries. At least ten boxes still remain at Stanford and the Hoover library, along with a rough copy of A Diet of Danger.

Frank Olson's family then sued the federal government.
