= Garland H. Williams =

American espionage agent

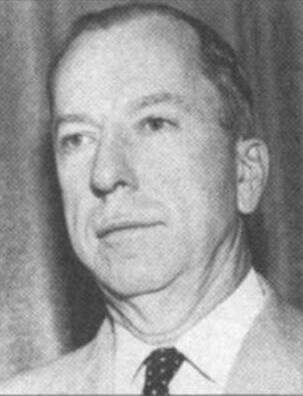

Chief, IRS Criminal Investigation
- In office January 1, 1953 – August 31, 1953
- Preceded by: Frank W. Lohn
- Succeeded by: A. Walter Fleming

Deputy Director of Training and Facilities of OSS
- In office 1942–1945
- Preceded by: Himself
- Succeeded by: Office Abolished

Director of Training of COI
- In office 1941–1942
- Preceded by: Office Established
- Succeeded by: Office Abolished

Chief of the Counterintelligence Corps
- In office 1 January 1942 – June 1942
- Preceded by: Himself
- Succeeded by: Henry G. Sheen

Chief of the Corps of Intelligence Police
- In office December 13, 1941 – January 1, 1942
- Preceded by: Office Established
- Succeeded by: Office Abolished

District Supervisor, Federal Bureau of Narcotics
- In office 1937–1952

Personal details
- Born: 5 January 1903 Prentiss, Mississippi U.S.
- Died: 1994 (aged 90–91) Memphis, Tennessee U.S.
- Education: University of Mississippi
- Nickname: Father of modern Army Counterintelligence

Military service
- Allegiance: United States
- Branch/service: United States Army; Military Intelligence Division; Office of the Coordinator of Information; Office of Strategic Services
- Years of service: 1941–1945 (active); 1945–1950 (reserve); 1950–1953 (active)
- Rank: Colonel
- Unit: OSS Detachment 101
- Commands: 1173rd Military Intelligence Group; 525th Interrogation Team
- Battles/wars: World War II; Operation Torch; Operation Market Garden; Operation Jedburgh; Korean War
- Police career
- Department: Customs Burea; Federal Bureau of Narcotics
- Service years: 1929–1941; 1945–1953
- Rank: District Supervisor

Garland H. Williams (1903–1993) was an American pioneer of covert investigations, military counterintelligence, white collar investigations, espionage, training and planning, and a lifelong law enforcement officer. He is a veteran of World War II and the Korean War. During World War II, Williams was integral in the training of thousands of American hopeful would-be undercover operatives and guerrilla fighters in both the Military Intelligence Division and the Office of Strategic Services.

== Early life ==
Williams graduated from the University of Mississippi with a degree in engineering.

== Career as a Government agent ==
=== Federal Agent (1929 to 1941) ===
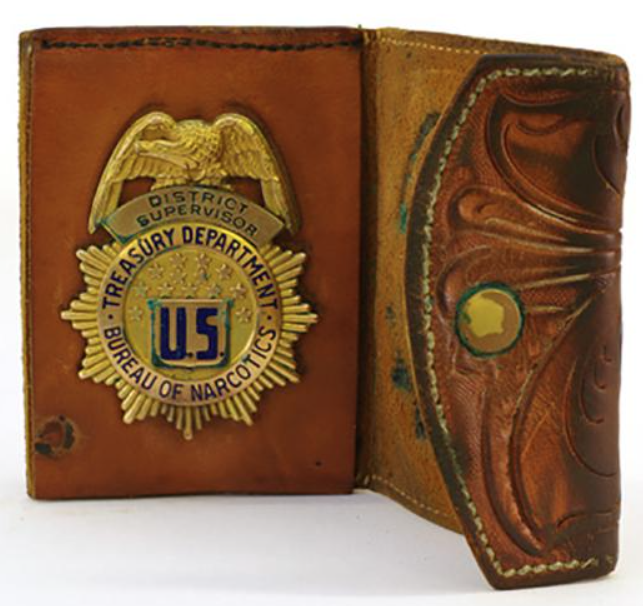
Federal Bureau Of Narcotics Badge

In 1929, Williams became an agent in the Bureau of Customs. However, a new opportunity took shape for Williams only one year later. In 1930, Williams was one of the first agents to join the newly established Federal Bureau of Narcotics (FBN), a predecessor agency of the Drug Enforcement Administration (DEA), where he became a life-long devotee.

While at the Bureau of Narcotics, Williams worked with men like "Charlie Cigars" and George Hunter White under the famous FBN Commissioner Harry J. Anslinger to take down massive criminal networks.

Historian John C. McWilliams said "He was likely the first FBN agent to use dogs - German shepherds and fox terriers to sniff out contraband drugs."

During the majority of his 24 years at the Bureau, Williams was a District Supervisor (DS), equivalent to what today would be called a Special Agent in Charge (SAC) in the DEA.

Williams was in charge of the New York field office of the FBN.

Williams worked for this organization for the next 24 years, only interrupted in his service by World War II and the Korean War, when he was encouraged by Anslinger to assume additional wartime duties, never relinquishing the title of Special Agent through the whole of the war.

=== Intelligence work (1941 to 1945) ===
==== Military Intelligence Division ====
In January 1941, prior to the US entry into the war, Williams was assigned to the Military Intelligence Division of the United States Army. On 13 December 1941, Williams reported for duty as Chief of the US Army's Corps of Intelligence Police (CIP), and became the first Commandant of the CIP Investigators Training School in Washington DC, located in a single room at the Army War College at Fort McNair.

The recruits that Williams taught here were between 22 and 33, had at least a high school diploma, had completed basic military training, and usually were affiliated with law enforcement in some form. Additionally, the Army attempted to recruit African-American and Asian-American agents for the first time in the organization's history.

The first class of students under Williams were taught a curriculum of study totaling of 61 separate courses and practical problems, primarily to include the principles of;

- observation and description
- espionage and counterespionage
- bombs and "infernal machines"
- undercover work
- immigrant registration laws
- methods of surveillance
- interrogation tactics
- fingerprinting
- codes and ciphers
- various laws of search and seizure, arrest, evidence gathering, and court procedures
- motives and methods of arsonists, burglars, saboteurs, espionage, and extremist organizations

Federal Bureau of Investigation (FBI) agents also occasionally helped instruct the new school on its methods of investigation, due to its intentional proximity to the FBI Headquarters. Thirty-nine men completed the first course; nine failed. On 7 October 1941, the school moved to Chicago. CIP became the Counter Intelligence Corps (CIC) in January 1942. The school changed its name to the CIC Investigators Training School.

Disputes arose over the centralization of recruitment, assignment, and promotion of CIC agents. Corps G-2s had performed this duty in World War I. Williams, now the inaugural Chief of the new CIC, wanted a centralized organization similar to the FBI, reporting directly to the Secretary of War. He thought that decentralization made organizations weak and unable to respond and adapt quickly to changing situations. The commanders in the field held their ground. Williams protested; "14 different policies, 14 different practices, 14 different methods of work, and, in general, 14 separate and distinct units." Williams requested reassignment to the Infantry School.

==== Office of Strategic Services ====
Williams was recruited into the Office of the Coordinator of Information (COI) by Millard Preston Goodfellow and William J. Donovan. Acquiring Williams' name from the top of a list of recommendations they requested from Anslinger, both men had become infinitely familiar with Williams' work at the CIC School, and they agreed with his notion of centralization. He would at be allowed to teach men the way that he felt they deserved, but first, he was ordered to learn some things from the British.

In January 1942, Williams was one of a dozen COI men of the Special Operations Branch to attend training at a British Special Operations Executive training camp outside of Toronto, Canada, called Camp X. There, he learned the British methods of sabotage, reconnaissance, guerrilla warfare, underwater and amphibious assault, trailing suspects, and managing networks. Many of these methods had American variants, and he had applied them well during his time at FNB and CIC, but the British SOE had at this point been engaged in full war in Europe for several years, America had only been "officially" engaged for a year.

On 23 February 1942, Goodfellow placed Williams in charge of Training Command, which was a section of Goodfellow's COI Service Command.

In April 1942, Goodfellow and his staff, including Williams, began planning for and recruiting guerrilla fighters into COI. Based on Williams' suggestions for the type of facility COI would need, Goodfellow secured three tracts of land from the National Park Service that would replicate Camp X on American soil, all within 50 miles of Washington, D.C.

These facilities were;

Prince William Forest Park, Catoctin Mountain Park, now the location of Camp David, and the Congressional Country Club in Bethesda, Maryland. The Facilities of the Catalina Island Marine Institute at Toyon Bay on Santa Catalina Island, Calif., are composed (in part) of a former OSS survival training camp.

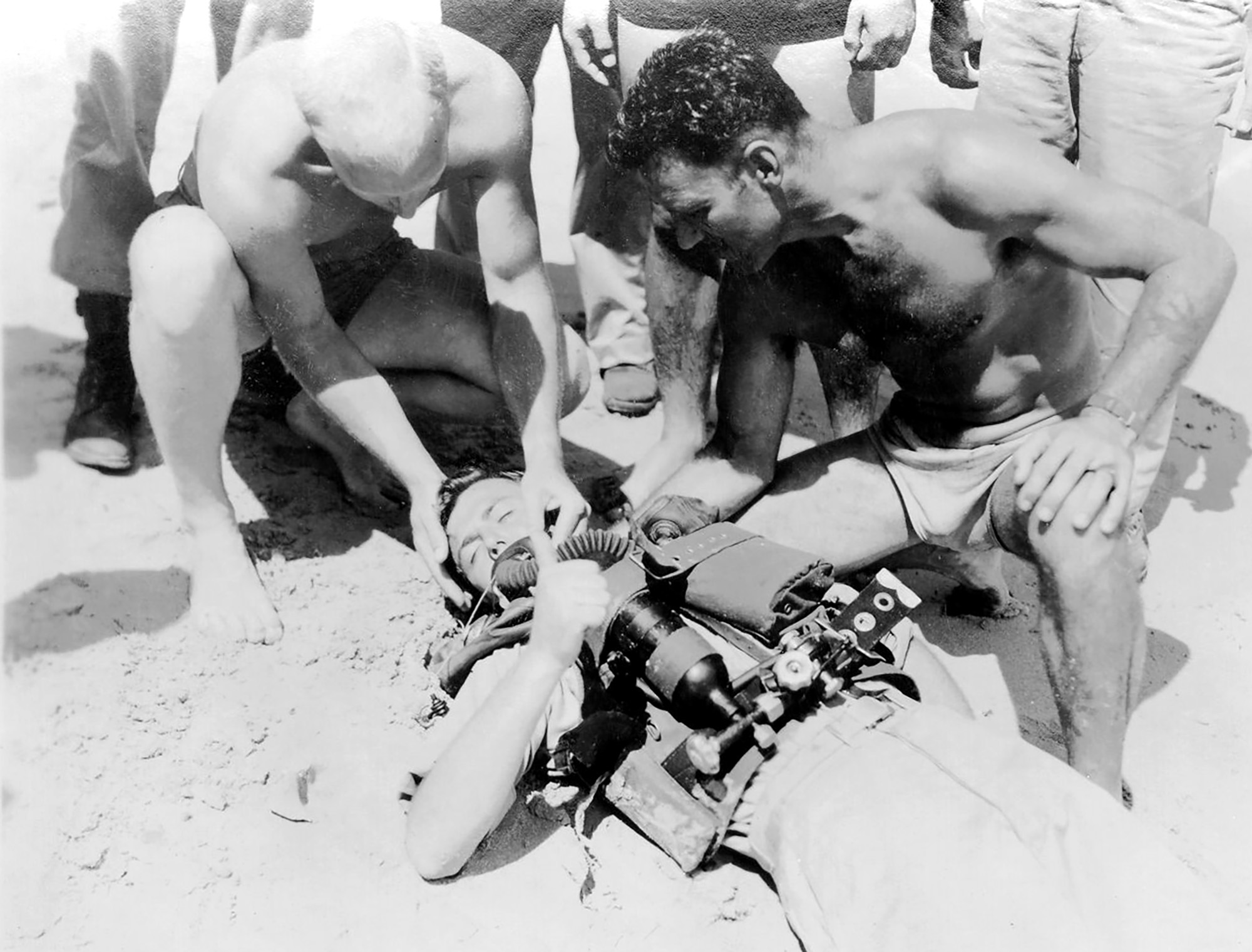
Underwater combat swimmer of the Office of Strategic Services Detachment 404 Maritime Unit

As Director of Training, Williams became the de facto director of these facilities, and eventually the training facilities that would appear around the world. He used his SOE training experience at Camp X as the model for his curriculum, based on the directions he received from Goodfellow, Donovan and David K. E. Bruce.

COI Recruits at this time were trained in small groups. The curriculum that Williams' settled on was this:

- Preliminary School – 2 weeks in demolitions, weapons, close combat;
- Basic School – 2 weeks in raids, attack, sabotage;
- Advanced Training School – 2 weeks in advanced work in security, instruction in undercover work in a foreign country with particular reference to cover, organizing natives, and the conduct of passive resistance and sabotage of enemy activities;
- Parachute School – 1 week;
- Maritime School – 1 week in landings from vessels and completing contact;
- Industrial Sabotage School – 3 weeks in industrial sabotage;
- Localized Social School – 2 weeks in "social circulation work," meaning sabotage and guerrilla warfare being only possible with the active cooperation or at least the tacit approval of the nearby populace, agents were instructed in elementary principles of social control and their applicability to control the local population.

Williams' cadre included;

- Lieutenant Rex Applegate, who taught combat pistol shooting
- Captain George Hunter White, his partner at FBN, who taught counterespionage.
- First Lieutenant Jerry M. Sage, (inspiration for Steve McQueen's character in the Great Escape) was physical conditioning trainer
- Marine Corps Lieutenant Elmer Harris, who taught fieldcraft and camouflage to prospective saboteurs.
- 1st Lt. Charles M. Parkin, who taught demolitions
- 2nd Lt. Frank A. Gleason, who taught demolitions, at age 21 SO's youngest cadre.
- British Army Major William E. Fairbairn, "Dangerous Dan," who taught what was called "gutter-fighting."
- British Colonel R.M. Brooker, who was Fairbairn's superior, and acted as SOE advisor to the whole training program
- British Navy Commander N.G.A. Woolley was loaned to COI and helped Donovan and Goodfellow organize underwater training and craft landing.

Williams was also integral in the creation of Detachment 101.

The OSS would soon enough expand their schoolhouses around the globe, and Williams monitored all training and doctrine, communicating with, and often going on missions with the other divisions of the OSS, to make sure that all new recruits were properly trained and capable.

In addition to his duties running the schoolhouses, Williams also reported on narcotics activities to Anslinger throughout the war. From the European theatre to the Far East, from India to Japan. Wherever Williams went, he was never far away from a telegraph or an envelope to send to Anslinger.

=== Return as Federal Agent (1945 to 1953) ===
==== Hunting Lucky Luciano ====
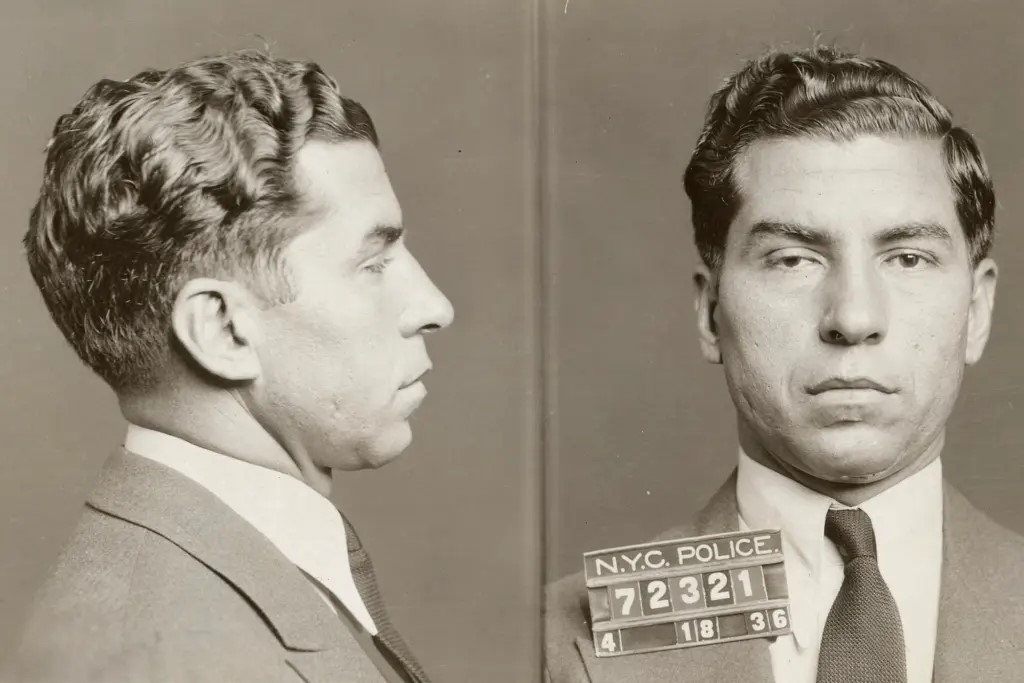
Charles "Lucky" Luciano mugshot

When World War II ended, the OSS was shuttered and restructured into the Central Intelligence Group in 1946, which only twenty months later would become the Central Intelligence Agency.

Williams' work with the FBN immediately resumed to full-time status when the OSS was shuttered, and Anslinger gave him and George Hunter White the assignment to track down and bring to justice Lucky Luciano - the Italian Chicago mob boss that the OSS and the Office of Naval Intelligence (ONI) had heavily depended on to guarantee safety of shipbuilding in Chicago and New York. ONI and OSS during the war had also used Luciano as an asset to ensure protection of American forces by the Italian criminal underworld as they invaded the country and advanced northward against the Germans.

Lucky Luciano had still been running his mob from behind bars, but the US granted him reduced sentence in 1945 for "wartime services to the country."

Williams charged that three months after Luciano's return [to Italy] from Cuba in 1947, the first large shipment of heroin, worth $250,000, was smuggled into the United States. -- The Luciano Story

Williams and White chased down the mob all around the world for Anslinger, sending reports from London, Paris, Iran, Ankara, Tehran, Athens, Baghdad, Beijing, and many more. The key difference between Williams and White in this time is that White shot quite a lot of people in the course of his investigations, for a lot of different reasons, and Williams didn't.

==== Korean War and the CIA ====
In the late 1940s, Williams was a Colonel in the US Army Reserves, and Commander of the 1173rd Military Intelligence Group, "the control group for New York City Reserve activities." Williams created an ad hoc section called GE-1 in the 1173 rd for "military intelligence personnel interested in Psychological Warfare." He formed a relationship with Colonel Ellsworth H. Gruber, arranging for Ellsworth to be a key player in the limited reserve Psywar activity in the New York Military District.

In May 1950, Williams was placed in charge of first existing Military Intelligence service group of Army Military Intelligence, the 525th Interrogation Team. They operated from secret bases to lay the groundwork for the US-UN advance. While working under the direction of the Central Intelligence Agency and General MacArthur, Williams and other CIA field men allegedly issued orders to their soldiers to "prove victory by turning in the enemy's ear."

One of the men that Williams worked with in the field was named Anthony Poshepny, who became the prototype for Lt. Kurtz in Apocalypse Now, a rogue CIA agent who embraced the dark side.

== Internal Revenue Service (1953 to retirement) ==
On January 1, 1953, he became Director of the IRS Intelligence Division. He served in the position until August 1953, for a total of 242 days – notable for the fact that he served the shortest term of anyone in that position to this point.His IRS personnel file is still pending FOIA request. In 1954, Williams tendered his resignation to the FBN.

== Post-retirement Government work ==
It is highly suspected that Williams was a key player in organizing regime change in Iran, but this is unconfirmed. It is however accurate that Williams was setting up an FBN network in Iran at around the same time that Mosidueq was overthrown and the Shah was reinstalled.

From 1952 to 1974, Williams also worked for an organization of the United States Department of State called the Office of Public Safety, under cover of the United States Agency for International Development (USAID) which trained foreign police departments in Latin America, South America, Africa, and Southeast Asia.
