= Helen Howell Moorhead =

American anti-opium advocate

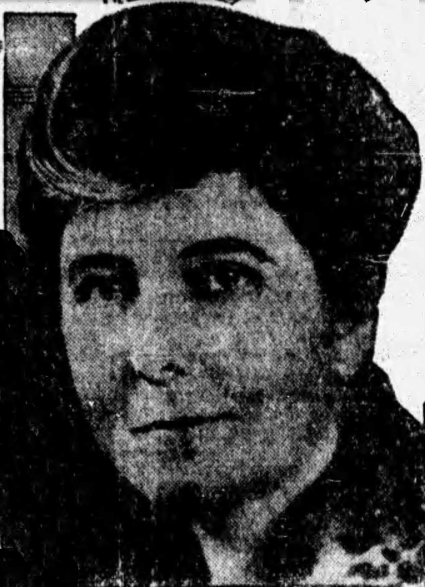
- Moorhead in 1929

Personal details
- Born: August 14, 1883 New Brunswick, New Jersey
- Died: March 6, 1950 (aged 66) Flagler Hospital, Florida, Florida
- Education: Bryn Mawr College; University of Grenoble

Helen Armstrong Howell Moorhead was an American Anti-opium advocate who was for many years the Chair of the Opium Research Committee of the Foreign Policy Association (FPA), emerging as what historians say to be "perhaps the most important non-state actor in the formation of international drug control." She was deeply entrenched in what historians call the "technical league" of policy professionals that shaped the League of Nations, and was a key figure in creating the Opium Advisory Committee. She was the first American woman to address an international opium conference at Geneva, and attended the three of these international opium conferences under the auspices of the League of Nations. She was present at the Second International Opium Convention and became heavily involved with the Permanent Central Opium Board. She was also present for the creation of the United Nations and the United Nations Office on Drugs and Crime.

From the early days of the League of Nations, the FPA had functioned as an unofficial surrogate for the U.S. government on opium issues: conducting public relations, lobbying elite opinion, and generating policy ideas. For more than twenty-five years, according to the historian William McAllister, she “provided social lubrication, acted as a go-between among governmental representatives, floated policy options, and served as a backchannel communications conduit.” With her counterparts in the international community, Dame Rachel Crowdy and Elizabeth Washburn Wright, she is considered an "honorary gentleman" of what had been dubbed the "Gentlemen's Club" of the international narcotics control regime.

The historian William McAllister writes of Moorhead that she was the:

"Driving force behind the FPA’s Opium Research Committee and hostess with the mostest. A woman of strong but closely held opinions. Master of private negotiations. Less well known than her contemporary, E.W. Wright, but more effective in international negotiations. Her behind-the-scenes style matched both the sensibilities of drug diplomats and the gender expectations of the age. She enjoyed the confidence of her fellow-travellers in narcotics circles more than the company of her own family."

Some historians suggest that Moorhead, like the members of the Inner Circle she directed, were creating moral panic in the United States to achieve political objectives.

== Biography ==
=== Early life ===
Helen Howell Moorhead was born in New Brunswick, New Jersey, into a prosperous family. She studied at Bryn Mawr College and later at the University of Grenoble in France. She married Dr. John Joseph Moorhead in 1907. They settled in New York City, where census records show that she and her husband lived comfortably with domestic staff and an adopted daughter, Anne. In her personal letters, Moorhead occasionally mentioned family life; one note from a 1930 voyage to Egypt referred humorously to her daughter's growth and the need for “a new set of clothes” to be purchased in Paris.

Before entering international work, Moorhead was active in civic and charitable projects. She volunteered with the New York State Charities Aid Association, where she encountered the growing problem of drug addiction among the city's poor. Her work on Blackwell's Island, an area housing hospitals, prisons, and almshouses, introduced her to early efforts at combining incarceration with medical treatment for addiction. These experiences influenced her later interest in narcotics reform. Around the same period, philanthropists such as John D. Rockefeller Jr. and Alva Belmont supported similar initiatives for medical treatment of drug users on Rikers Island.

=== World War I ===
During World War I, Moorhead was the national superintendent of surgical dressings for the American Red Cross.

Her husband, John J. Moorhead, was deployed to France, where he earned the Gold Medal of Honor, the Croix de Guerre, the Distinguished Service Cross, and the New York Distinguished Service Medal. Their relationship began to sour after the war.

=== Foreign Policy Association ===
After the war she joined the newly created Foreign Policy Association (FPA) in 1923. The FPA sought to encourage public understanding of international affairs and to promote cooperation among nations. Its activities, research publications, public lectures, and early radio broadcasts, helped popularize foreign policy discussion in the United States during the Interwar period.

Moorhead's earlier experience with addiction issues and social work suited her new responsibilities within the Association. She became involved in its Opium Research Committee, which studied international narcotics control and advised on policy at a time when the League of Nations was organizing conferences on the subject. By the mid-1920s she had risen to chair the committee, directing research and public education campaigns. A 1927 report described the committee as having played “a vigorous and effective role” in nearly every major opium debate of the decade.

Her colleagues regarded Moorhead as an able organizer and communicator. She was one of several women who gained visibility in international drug control during this period, alongside Elizabeth Wright, Sarah Graham-Mulhall, and Elizabeth Bass. Moorhead frequently traveled abroad on behalf of the FPA, attending meetings and conducting interviews with officials. In one 1930 letter written while abroad, she remarked that she “really liked politics,” a comment that reflected her growing interest in policy work beyond education and research.

Moorhead was also active in American political life. She supported the New Deal and worked with officials such as M. L. Wilson, Assistant Secretary of Agriculture. Wilson described her as an energetic but practical reformer rather than an idealistic crusader. In her public statements, Moorhead often linked domestic drug regulation with international agreements, arguing that the United States could not uphold its treaty obligations if physicians failed to follow national restrictions on narcotic prescriptions. Through her work at the FPA, she helped connect international narcotics policy to broader discussions of public health and law enforcement at home.

=== The Inner Circle ===
During World War II, her role in opium control positioned her as the de facto leader of Harry Anslinger's wartime Inner Circle, a network of Washington-based narcotics prohibition advocates and international collaborators who coordinated narcotics policy. While others, such as Herbert May and Joseph P. Chamberlain, also played prominent roles within the FPA, Moorhead's combination of diplomatic skill and informal influence allowed her to link-up government officials, international delegates, and civil society in shaping global narcotics control policy. Other members of the Inner Circle included Breckinridge Long, Victor Hoo, Clem Sharman, George Morlock, Arthur Elliott Felkin, and Leon Steinig.

By 1942, the Inner Circle began discussing principles for the postwar regulation of narcotics and the abolition of colonial opium monopolies, such as the French Opium Regie and the Dutch Opiumregie. Opposing them was what Colonel Sharman later characterized as the Wait-and-See faction, led by Malcolm Delevingne and Bertil Renborg of the League of Nations Secretariat. The Wait-and-See faction adopted a more cautious stance, proposing that attention be directed toward consolidating the existing drug control treaties into a single comprehensive convention, while also preparing for the re-establishment of international supervisory mechanisms once the war had ended.

Moorhead despised the Wait-and-See faction. When Bertil Renborg fled Europe for Washington, she personally described him as "stupid" and was part of the effort to push him out of Washington, believing his formal, diplomatic style was ill-suited to the pragmatic and ambitious post-war planning they were undertaking.

Moorhead was an active participant in a series of crucial, choreographed meetings held between December 1942 and March 1943, which were designed to suggest U.S. government backing and build a Pacific consensus to isolate the British and Dutch. She was part of a sophisticated diplomatic effort to pressure the British government. In one instance, she was involved in an overture through the FPA to the British Council of Churches, fishing for intelligence on Whitehall's discussions.

Moorhead specifically wanted any British policy change to appear as "the result of British opinion, not American pressure," aiming to help the British "save their face."

=== United Nations ===
By 1944, the U.S. State Department directly tasked her with drafting the "very best plan" for a future international drug control apparatus. In her proposal, she forcefully argued that narcotics control should be treated as an independent subject under the United Nations Economic and Social Council (ECOSOC). She contended that the problem was fundamentally a "restrictive economic and policing problem" and warned that associating it with social welfare or public health agencies would strip it of its effectiveness. This memo ultimately became the de facto, though unofficial, U.S. framework for the post-war system. Moorhead also played a key role in ensuring the old League system was not revived, expressing her strong regret at the idea of calling a meeting of the "pretty completely dead" Opium Advisory Committee, which she believed should be wiped out in favor of a new setup.

Her activism extended to direct diplomatic lobbying. She traveled to London for the United Nations Preparatory Commission to unofficially influence proceedings, vowing to Anslinger that she would "try to think each time what you would have done." There, she gained irregular access to important, closed-door meetings and worked closely with the Chinese delegation, advising them on drafting the resolution that would create the new Commission on Narcotic Drugs (CND). Despite these efforts, she grew frustrated, feeling the inner circle was being sidelined by the official U.S. delegation, a situation she lamented was a repeat of the San Francisco Conference.

Reflecting on the process, she astutely concluded that the inner circle's difficulties were due to not having a high-ranking official within the State Department to support Anslinger. While she was "very satisfied" with the outcome of the CND's creation, she presciently warned that the U.S. had "won a battle, but not the war," and strongly advocated for Anslinger's direct involvement in future delegations to act as a guardian for their "new born child."

== Death ==
Moorhead died suddenly at the age of 66 on March 6, 1950. Upon the occasion of her death, the Foreign Policy Bulletin drafted the following to be read aloud by the members of the UNODC:

"Mrs. Moorhead was one of the few persons in the world with a thorough knowledge of the international control of narcotic drugs. Her penetrating studies in this field commanded the respect of technical experts, and she never flagged in her endeavours to bring about understanding between nations with respect to drug control."

== Written works ==
- International administration of narcotic drugs 1828-1934
- Narcotics Control under the UN
- International Narcotics Control: 1939-1946
