= Henri Brenier =

French explorer and colonial government administrator (1867–1962)

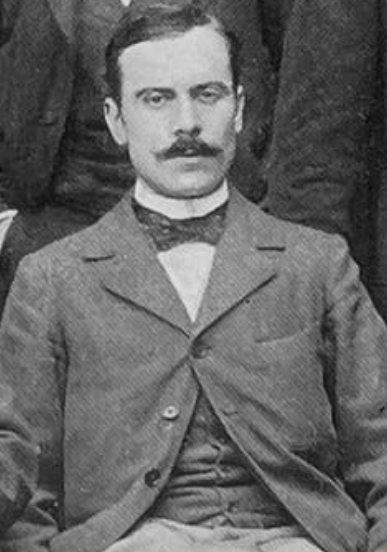
- Brenier in Paris, 1899

League of Nations Assessor to the Opium Advisory Committee
- In office 1920–1928 Serving with Elizabeth Washburn Wright; John Jordan

Director General of the Marseille Chamber of Commerce
- In office 1914–1934
- Chamber Presidents: Adrien Artaud; Hubert Giraud; Emile Rastoin; Edgar David; George Brenier; Maurice Hubert; Felix Prax

Secretary General of the 11th Economic Region, Government of France
- In office 1914–1934

Chief of the Department of Economic Affairs, General Government of Indochina
- In office 1898–1914

Deputy Director of Agriculture, Forestry and Trade, General Government of Indochina
- In office 1898

Director of the Lyon Expedition
- In office 1895–1897

Foreign Policy Editor at the Journal des débats
- In office 1892–1895

Personal details
- Born: August 16, 1867 Shanghai French Concession, Shanghai
- Died: February 18, 1962 (aged 94) Marseille, France
- Spouse: Blanche de Revilliod
- Parents: Georges-Albert Brenier; Antoinette "Isabelle" Brenier de Montmorand
- Education: Ecole des Sciences Politiques
- Awards: Officer of the Legion of Honour
- Member: Académie des sciences d'outre-mer; Académie des sciences coloniales; Académie des Sciences Morales et Politiques; Académie de Marseille

Henri-Antoine-Marie-Joseph-Anatole Brenier was a colonial-born French journalist, who became an explorer and geographer, and later became a government official for the French colonial empire.

He was also an economist, a merchant, and a book publisher who led several studies on the economy of French Indochina, and analyzed its economic index against the surrounding Asian colonies and independent states.

Brenier is perhaps most well known for his leadership of the Lyon Expedition (also later known as the Brenier Mission), an expedition into China for the Lyon Chamber of Commerce that covered over 20,000 kilometers and took several years to accomplish. At the turn of the century, Brenier entered into the colonial government of French Indochina for over a decade, working in economics and agriculture.

While serving in the colonial government, Brenier developed a keen interest in the economics of the opium trade. His position was intimately involved with the management of the Opium Regie. At the beginning of World War I, Brenier was made director general of the Marseille Chamber of Commerce, where he hosted "events" and "social occasions" for many of Europe's top arms dealers.

Concurrently to that post, he was also assigned to the Government of France. Infamously, during the war, he was co-author of the Brenier-Artaud Memorandum, which urged the creation of a French colony in the Middle East called "Greater Syria." At the end of the war, and the founding of the League of Nations, Brenier's experience in the opium trade encouraged his placement as an Assessor to the Opium Advisory Committee (OAC), the League's effort to create a system of international laws and control in narcotics. He sat on the OAC in Geneva for nearly a full decade, having attended its very first meeting.

== Early life and career as journalist ==
Brenier was born into the height of the French colonial empire in Asia, when France still possessed a territory in the city of Shanghai called the French Concession of Shanghai, a district which was entirely colonized and Europeanized by the European empire. The French Concession was only one of many Foreign concessions in China. Brenier grew up around the shipping industry: his father, Georges-Albert Brenier, was the director of the Shanghai branch of Messageries Maritimes, the French merchant shipping company. His mother was Antoinette “Isabelle” Brenier de Montmorand.

Brenier's parents sent him to study in Paris at the École libre des Sciences Politiques, where he graduated with a diploma in 1892.

After graduation, Brenier became the foreign policy editor of the Journal des débats. At some point, he was made the editor in chief of the newspaper's periodical.

== The Lyon Expedition (1895–1897) ==
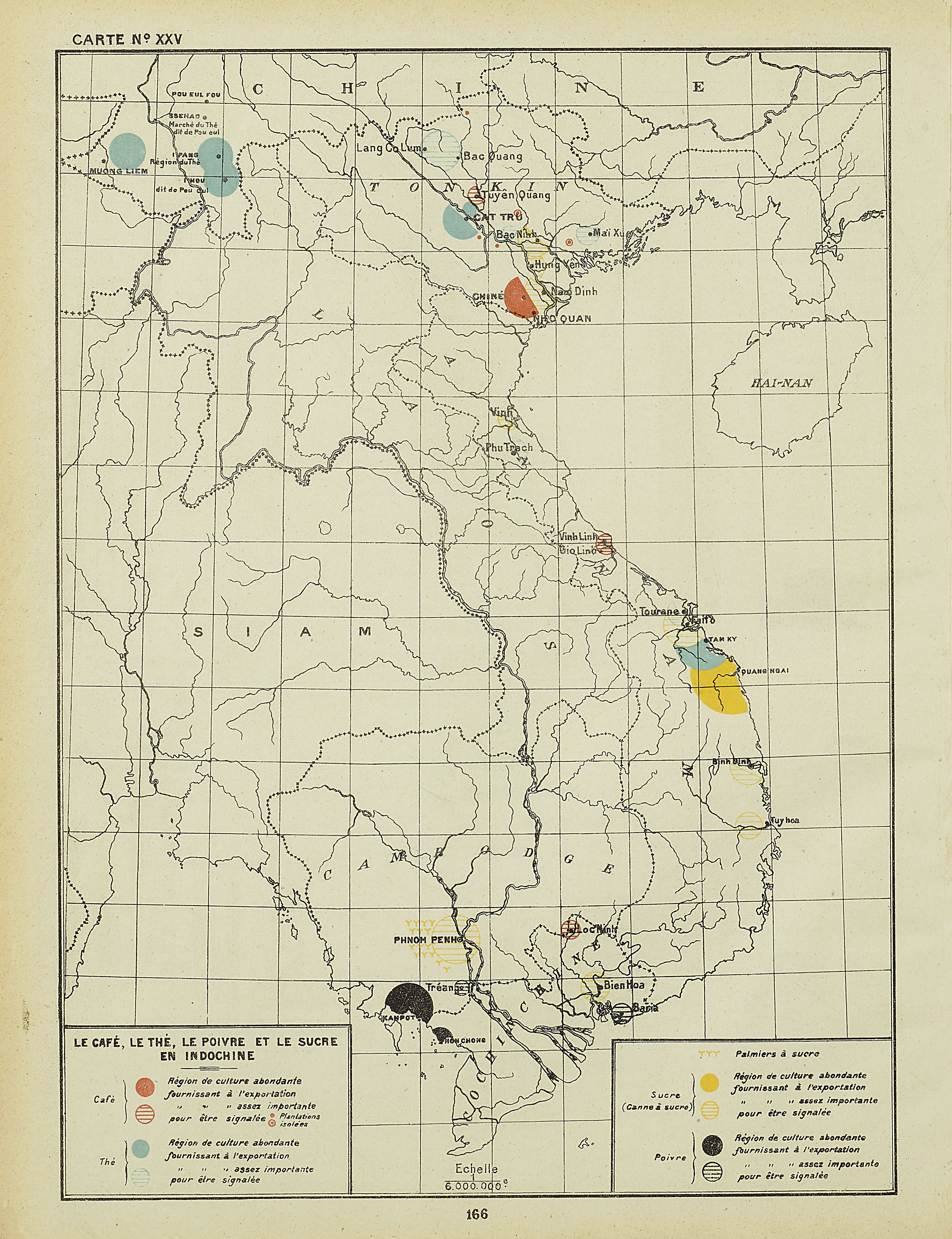
Brenier's expedition through Asia produced many maps and charts, such as this one of the Indochinese Peninsula

While he was still working at the newspaper, he was selected to become a part of a multi-year economic discovery mission into the heart of China. This was the Lyon Expedition (French: Mission lyonnaise d’exploration commerciale en Chine), sponsored by the Lyon Chamber of Commerce, known at that time as vying to become the second city of France. Another organizer of the expedition was Ulysse Pila, president of the Compagnie lyonnaise d'Indochine. After the team was selected and fully funded, Brenier left his position at the paper and set off, now assigned as the Secretary General for the expedition.

However, shortly after the team set off, the original mission leader, Consul Émile Rocher, got sick. Brenier took over the mission. He covered over 20,000 kilometers with his team into the interior and across China. The expedition especially analyzed economic trade routes between port cities, along rivers, and along the ancient rural interior walking paths which were quickly globalizing with the arrival of roads and trains. The trip explored Yunnan and Tonkin, traveled up to Sichuan, Lanzhou and Tatsien-Lou, then back to Hainan and Tonkin. In 1897, after the expedition concluded, Brenier returned to Paris where he spent about a year collating all of the data that the expedition had gathered, in order to produce the written work La Mission lyonnaise d’exploration commerciale de la Chine. He presented his findings to the Lyon Chamber of Commerce and the Geographic Society of Lyon (French: Société de Géographie de Lyon), among other institutions across France.

Brenier's findings stressed that there was a relatively small amount of trade occurring at the time between Yunnan and Tonkin. He also mapped the importance of the Chinese mines of Mongzi. Unfortunately, the expedition did not take any photographs of the interior of those mines.

== Career in the colonial government (1898–1914) ==
In 1898, Brenier joined the General Government of Indochina, briefly serving as the deputy director for the colony's Directorate of Agriculture, Forestry, and Trade. Later in 1898, he was made the Chief of the Department of Economics. In this posting, Brenier developed an interest in the opium trade, both academically and professionally. His position in the colonial government was intricately linked to the Opium Regie, which was a government monopoly in the colony that was mandated to manufacture and sell "legal" opium. In documents of the First International Opium Convention, held in 1912, his occupation was listed as "Advisory Inspector of the Agricultural and Commercial Service of Indochina."

The French historian Thomas Claire writes:

"Henri Brenier, head of the Economic Affairs Department at the General Government, played a central role in the development of a systematic statistical practice in Indochina. His Essai d'atlas statistique de l'Indochine française, published in 1914, offered a numerical overview of Indochina, embellished with numerous infographics, taking into account, among other things, the geographical, demographic, financial, agricultural, commercial and industrial dimensions... Henri Brenier was also the specialist assigned to Indochina on the issue of opium, and appointed negotiator at the international conferences (Shanghai and The Hague)"

In 1901, he married Blanche de Revilliod in Saigon.

== Marseille Chamber of Commerce and service in the French government (1914–1934) ==
=== World War I ===
Around the commencement of World War I in 1914, Brenier became the director general of the Marseille Chamber of Commerce, the oldest Chamber of Commerce in the world. During his time at the Chamber, he hosted Joseph G. Butler Jr. for several dinners during Butler's tour of France. He worked on the extension of the Port of Marseille, and also established trade relationships between Marseille and Asia. He published a written work related to the shipping business of Marseille entitled Le canal de Marseille au Rhône et l'avenir du premier port de France. Marseille at this time was France's primary port on the Mediterranean Sea. Everything for the war effort went through Marseille, which made the port and its surrounding waters a primary hunting ground for early German submarines. One important economic activity at the Port of Marseille during the war was in the arms industry, especially in securing shipments from Yugoslavia and also for several decades before, into North Africa. It was around this time that these merchants in Marseille acquired the moniker as merchants of death. According to Joseph Butler, Brenier hosted several "dinners" and "social occasions" at the Chamber, where arms dealers attended.

He was also assigned at this time as the Secretary General of the 11th Economic Region of the Government of France. This economic region consisted of; Alpes-Maritimes, Basses-Alpes, Bouches-du-Rhöne, Corse, Gard, Hautes-Alpes, Var, Vaucluse, and Marseille. The economic regions of France are the predecessors of the Regions of France, which were established in 1989.

=== The question of Syria ===
In early 1916, Brenier joined with the President of the Marseille Chamber of Commerce, Adrien Artaud, in writing the Brenier-Artaud Memorandum, in which they argued for the creation of a French colony in the Middle East. This colony would be on lands at that time occupied by the Ottoman Empire, and it would not be for another two years that the British capture of Damascus took place. The map of the Arab Kingdom of Syria in 1918 corresponded almost exactly to the map of the projected French colony that Brenier and Artaud drew up, except that colony was now shared among the other colonial powers of the Occupied Enemy Territory Administration (OETA).

In 1921, in a volume he wrote in English addressed to the people of the United Kingdom, Bernier wrote the following concerning French Syria:

"In truth, the continuation of our traditional influence in Syria, which dates back 900 years, with the consent of the Syrians and in order to lead them progressively to self-government, is an inheritance we cannot, in honour and, as we have just said, in justice, be called upon to give up. We think we can say that we are locked up with the Syrians principally by the benefits we have conferred on them; and to be set aside from such a ground of hereditary work would be tantamount to suffering a defeat in our costly victory."

=== League of Nations ===
At the end of the war, and the founding of the League of Nations, Brenier's experience in the opium trade encouraged his placement as an Assessor to the Opium Advisory Committee (OAC), the League's effort to create a system of international laws and control in narcotics. He sat on the OAC in Geneva for nearly a full decade, having attended its very first meeting.

In 1928, the Committee had a difficult time deciding if they wanted to assign a replacement Assessor for Brenier. They debated on who his replacement should be for several years, as is shown in correspondences throughout 1930 and 1931.

== World War II ==
During World War II, some Frenchmen suggested selling colonial Indochina to the Empire of Japan to avoid extensive losses. Brenier, along with Auguste Isaac, the former President of the Lyon Chamber of Commerce, was firmly opposed to this idea.

In 1942, when the Japanese approached the city of Singapore, Brenier wrote in the Journal des débats: "It is truly not only from the economic, but also from the cultural and political viewpoints, a crossroads in world history."

== Written works ==
=== Nonfiction and survey work ===
- “Du Tonkin considéré comme voie de pénétration vers le Sze-Tchouan”, Bulletin de la Société de géographie commerciale de Paris (BSGCP), 1896.
- “Le Tonkin, principales cultures, richesses du sol, industries, commerce”, BSGCP, 1896.
- “La Mission Brenier”, Dépêche coloniale, Sept. 1897.
- La Mission lyonnaise d’exploration commerciale de la Chine, Lyon, A. Rey et Cie, 1898, 531 p.
- “Le bananier sauvage en Indochine, son utilisation possible comme textile”, Bulletin économique de l’Indochine (BECI), vol IV, 1901.
- Note sur le développement commercial de l’Indochine de 1897 a 1901 comparé avec la période quinquennale de 1892 à 1895, Hanoi, 1902.
- Le marché du sucre en Extreme-Orient, Hanoi, Schneider, 1903.
- “Répartition saisonnière des récoltes et pluviometrie en Indochine”, BECI, Nov-Dec 1908.
- [with Henri Russier, head of the Education Department in Cambodia], Géographie élémentaire de l’Indochine [with maps and diagrams by Lt. H. Bancel], Hanoi-Haiphong, 1909.
- Un livre anglais sur le Yun-nan [extract from BEFEO Jan. 1910], Hanoi-Haïphong, Imprimerie d’Extreme-Orient, in‑8, 1910.
- [with H. Russier] L’Indochine française, avec 56 gravures dans le texte et 4 cartes hors texte en couleur, Paris, Librairie Armand Colin, 1911.
- [map 1/2500.000 in] A.C. Baudenne, “A travers le Laos (Guide à l’usage des voyageurs)”, BECI, 1911.
- Essai d’atlas statistique de l’Indochine française, Hanoi-Haiphong, Gouvernement Général de l’Indochine, 1914.
- “Où en est la question de l’opium?”, BECI, n 106, 1914.
- Les ressources de l’Indochine et leur mise en valeur après la guerre, 1917.
- French Points of View, being letters to the British Press and others, Paris, 1921; facsimile Gyan Books, 2017, 67p.
- Le traité de Versailles et le problème des réparations: le point de vue français, 1921.
- Congrès de l’organisation coloniale: Présentation, 1922.
- Essai d’atlas statistique de la IXe Région économique: Basses-Alpes, Hautes-Alpes, Alpes-Maritimes, Bouches du-Rhône, Var, Vaucluse, Gard, Corse, 1927.

=== Poetry ===
- Laques et cloisonnés: Sonnets, Paris, Éditions de la Revue des Poètes, 1931
