= Hampden Coit DuBose =

Hampden Coit DuBose (30 September 1845 in Darlington, South Carolina – 22 March 1910 in Suzhou) was a missionary in China with the American Presbyterian Mission (South) and founder of the Anti-Opium League in China. DuBose was the son of Julius Jesse DuBose, a minister, and Margaret Eliza Thompson. He married Pauline McAlpine and had seven children with her.

== Career ==
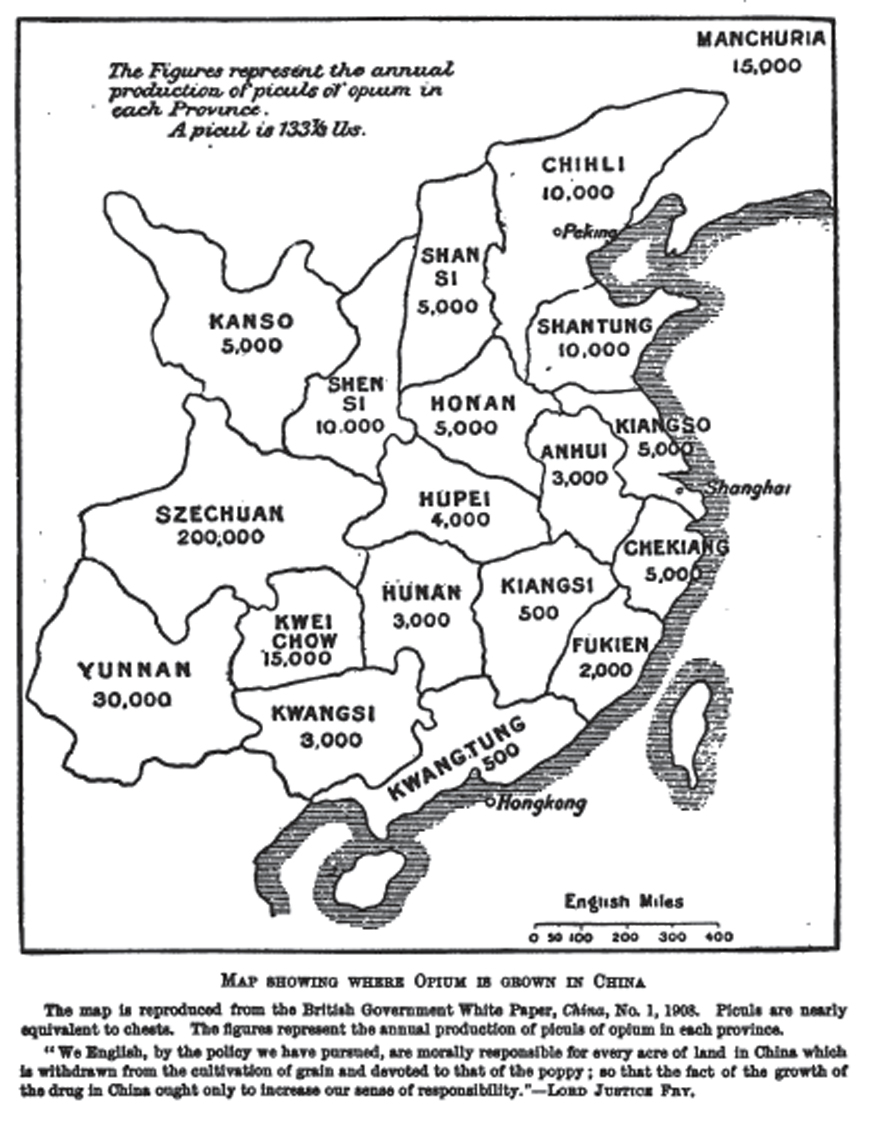
Map showing the amount of Opium produced in China in 1908

DuBose was born in South Carolina and a graduated from Columbia Theological Seminary. He and his wife Pauline went to China as missionaries with the Southern Presbyterian Church in 1872 and settled in Suzhou along the Grand Canal of China. His Chinese name is Du Buxi 杜步西.

As a witness of the destructive problems of opium addiction in China, he was moved to join with other likeminded missionaries and Christian medical workers to form the Anti-Opium League in China. DuBose was its first president. In 1899 the League published a seminal book called Opinions of Over 100 Physicians on the Use of Opium in China. The book illustrated the purpose of the league and published facts about the opium abuse crisis that ultimately influenced public opinion against the trade. DuBose eventually gained the support of U.S. President Theodore Roosevelt, the U.S. Congress, and the International Opium Commission. In 1906 the League achieved success when the British Parliament declared that the trade was "morally indefensible." DuBose circulated a petition signed by over a thousand missionaries in China and it was presented to the Guangxu Emperor. In turn the Emperor issued an imperial edict, following verbatim the petition Dubose had drafted, which prohibited the trade and abuse of opium.

In a letter to U.S. Senator John L. McLaurin he called upon the U.S. to own its responsibility for the opium trade, in that, along with Great Britain it had profited at the expense of the Chinese. He asserted:

…opium has no judicious use…save as administered by a physician

DuBose was memorialized in Suzhou by a stone tablet and in the United States by being elected moderator of the General Assembly of the Southern Presbyterian Church in 1891. DuBose's missionary career in Suzhou lasted 38 years until his death in 1910.

== Works authored ==
- Hampden Coit DuBose, Preaching in Sinim: The Gospel to the Gentiles, with Hints and Helps for Addressing a Heathen Audience (1873)
- Hampden Coit DuBose, The Dragon, the Image, and the Demon: Or the Three Religions of China Confucianism, Buddhism and Taoism (1887)
- Hampden Coit DuBose, Memoirs of Dr. J. Leighton Wilson (1895)
- Hampdon Coit DuBose, Beautiful Soo, the Capital of Kiangsu (1899)
- Hampden Coit DuBose, sermons (Chinese language)
- Hampden Coit DuBose, Bible study aids (Chinese language)
- Hampden Coit DuBose, 三教問答 = A catechism of the three religions of China (Shanghai, 1888).

== See also ==
- Benjamin Broomhall Anti-opium activist in England
