= Opium Advisory Committee =

Body of the League of Nations (1920-1940)

- Advisory Committee on the Traffic in Opium and other Dangerous Drugs
- Abbreviation: OAC
- Successor: Commission on Narcotic Drugs
- Formation: Established 15 December 1920; First meeting 2–5 May 1921
- Founded at: Geneva
- Dissolved: 1940
- Legal status: Defunct
- Headquarters: Geneva
- Origins: Hague Opium Convention
- Secretary General: 1920–1933 Sir Eric Drummond; 1933–1940 Joseph Avenol
- Parent organization: League of Nations: Opium and Social Questions Section

The Opium Advisory Committee (OAC), more formally entitled the Advisory Committee on the Traffic in Opium and other Dangerous Drugs, was a body of the League of Nations as according to the Organization of the League of Nations being responsible for international cooperation in the areas related to opium, narcotic drugs and those other drugs classified as "dangerous."

== History ==
The first meeting of the OAC lasted for 3 days, from the 2nd to the 5th of May, 1921.

The founding members of the Committee consisted of the following:

China	Tang Tsai-Fou
France	Gaston Kahn
Great Britain	Malcolm Delevingne
Netherlands	Willem Gideon van Wettum (Opiumregie)
India	John Campbell
Japan	Akira Ariyoshi
Portugal	Bartolomeu Ferreira
Siam	(Prince) Charoonsakdi Kritakara
Assessors	Henri Brenier (Opium Regie)
Assessors	John Jordan
Assessors	Elizabeth Washburn Wright

The main differences in the approaches to opium control and enforcement among the delegations stemmed from the fact that in North America, there was a well established Temperance movement, whereas the European colonial powers were making millions in their opium monopolies.

In the United States, the Harrison Narcotics Tax Act was passed in 1918, effectively banning opium outright without a medical license to supply its derivatives as painkillers. For several years, the United States maintained narcotics control through its Miscellaneous Division, but the Narcotics Division of the Bureau of Prohibition was established in the same year of 1920 as the League of Nations. In the following decade, Narcotics Agents would make more arrests overall than their Dry Agent counterparts. Also in 1920, the Canadians had passed the Opium and Narcotic Drug Act. Shortly afterward, in 1921, the Canadian Narcotics Division was established under the ownership of the Royal Canadian Mounted Police and the Minister of Health.

Meanwhile, the three main European delegations had by this point effectively monopolized the drug trade in their Asian colonies. The British were committed to a policy of Opium farming in their colonial possessions at this point, and the French managed an Opium Regie in their colony of French Indochina. However, by far the most successful colonial monopoly over opium and its derivatives was the Netherlands' Opiumregie, which held a vice-grip over the colony of the Dutch East Indies, being modeled as it were after several successive state monopolies on opium that the Dutch had held in these islands since the early 1700's.

Another point of contention was the fear that the European colonial powers held over the rise of communism in Asia, and specifically in China. Where the Japanese and Chinese ministers had been old friends, and would often support one another's decisions – John Chambers, the delegate representing India, had previously laid heavy claims at the International Opium Convention that the majority of opium coming into his country was being produced in India.

When the League of Nations was created in 1920, a schism formed within the leadership as to the approach of global enforcement – those who were, as the saying goes, "tough on crime," felt that the mechanisms outlined in the framework of the OAC were not strong enough to effectuate adequate drug controls. Since the Congress of the United States had not at this point ratified its membership in the League, the US Commissioner for Narcotics at the time, Levi G. Nutt, was not able to fully influence global policy to reflect his hard domestic sentencing for addicts. He did, however, find an ally in Elizabeth Wright, who served as the first American Assessor of the OAC, and was the widow of the former United States Opium Commissioner. Other allies of the former Commissioner, including Charles Brent, took the opportunity to speak ad naseum on the American view.

In the 1920's, the mantle of enforcement interpretation was largely held by the British Empire and their representative Malcolm Delevingne. His French counterpart, Gaston Kahn, was present at the first meeting, but Khan's political power stature as Frenchman at the League was largely overshadowed by Léon Bourgeois, who served as the first President of the Council of the League of Nations at the time.

Beginning in 1930, especially after the creation of the Federal Bureau of Narcotics (FBN), and the rise of the prominence and profile of Harry J. Anslinger on the world stage, the politics of international drug enforcement cooperation shifted significantly, and the United States began to take more of a leadership role in global enforcement. His Canadian counterpart, Charles Henry Ludovic Sharman, shared many of Anslinger's views and was eager to implement a more American optic of enforcement. Russell Pasha, their Egyptian counterpart, while holding a very different outlook on marijuana than did Sharman and Anslinger, felt that opium was the most deadly narcotic on the planet, and shared his vast global intelligence network with Anslinger and the FBN.

As World War II rapidly approached in the second half of the 30's, the global mechanisms of the OAC began to fail. Initially, the Nazis did not hold much influence over the OAC, but increasingly their antisemitic views began to influence the drug enforcement mechanisms of other European states. Towards the end of the decade, and especially in cables from the German delegation, opium traffickers highlighted in documents were nearly all of Jewish origin; Joseph Raskin, Sami Bernstein, Herman Blauaug, Gabriel Munk, Moses (or Leib) Weidler, Thomas Petrou Zacharian, the Polish brothers Zahnwel and Ajzyk Zellinger, Simon Lamm, Nathan Altmann, and Traian Schor. While these persons were indeed members of a small network of Jewish drug dealers in Vienna at the time, the Nazis consistently published documents that stated that the majority of drug dealing in Europe was done by Jews.

As the members of the final session of the OAC were leaving Geneva in 1940, the war in Europe had already begun.
