= National Day (Thailand) =

Public holiday in Thailand

- Thai national flag
- Observed by: Thailand
- Type: National day, public holiday
- Significance: Bhumibol Adulyadej's birthday
- Begins: 6 February 2017
- Date: 5 December
- Frequency: Annual

The National Day (Thai: วันชาติ) is a public holiday in Thailand (formerly Siam). Presently, it is observed on 5 December, the birthday of King Bhumibol Adulyadej. Historically, the National Day was observed on 6 April (since 1920 at least), which corresponded to the Chakri Day, the day commemorating the Chakri dynasty, and on 24 June (since 1938), which corresponded to the day of the Siamese revolution, before it was replaced in 1960 by the National Celebrations Day (Thai: วันเฉลิมฉลองของชาติ), observed on 5 December, and was revived in 2017, also observed on 5 December.

== History ==
=== 6 April ===
In 1920, Prince Charunsak Kridakon, Siamese diplomatic minister in Paris, informed the Siamese foreign ministry through a telegram dated 2 July that the Spanish government inquired him about any national day of Siam in order to list it on diplomatic documents and he was unsure about it because the Siamese legation in Paris used to hold national celebrations on three days, namely, the king's birthday, the New Year's Day, and the king's enthronement day. Prince Devawongse Varoprakar, Siamese foreign minister, then requested an opinion from King Vajiravudh, and the king's secretary, Prince Dhani Nivat, replied that the king said "tell them that it is 6 April, the day we call Chakri Day".

=== 24 June ===
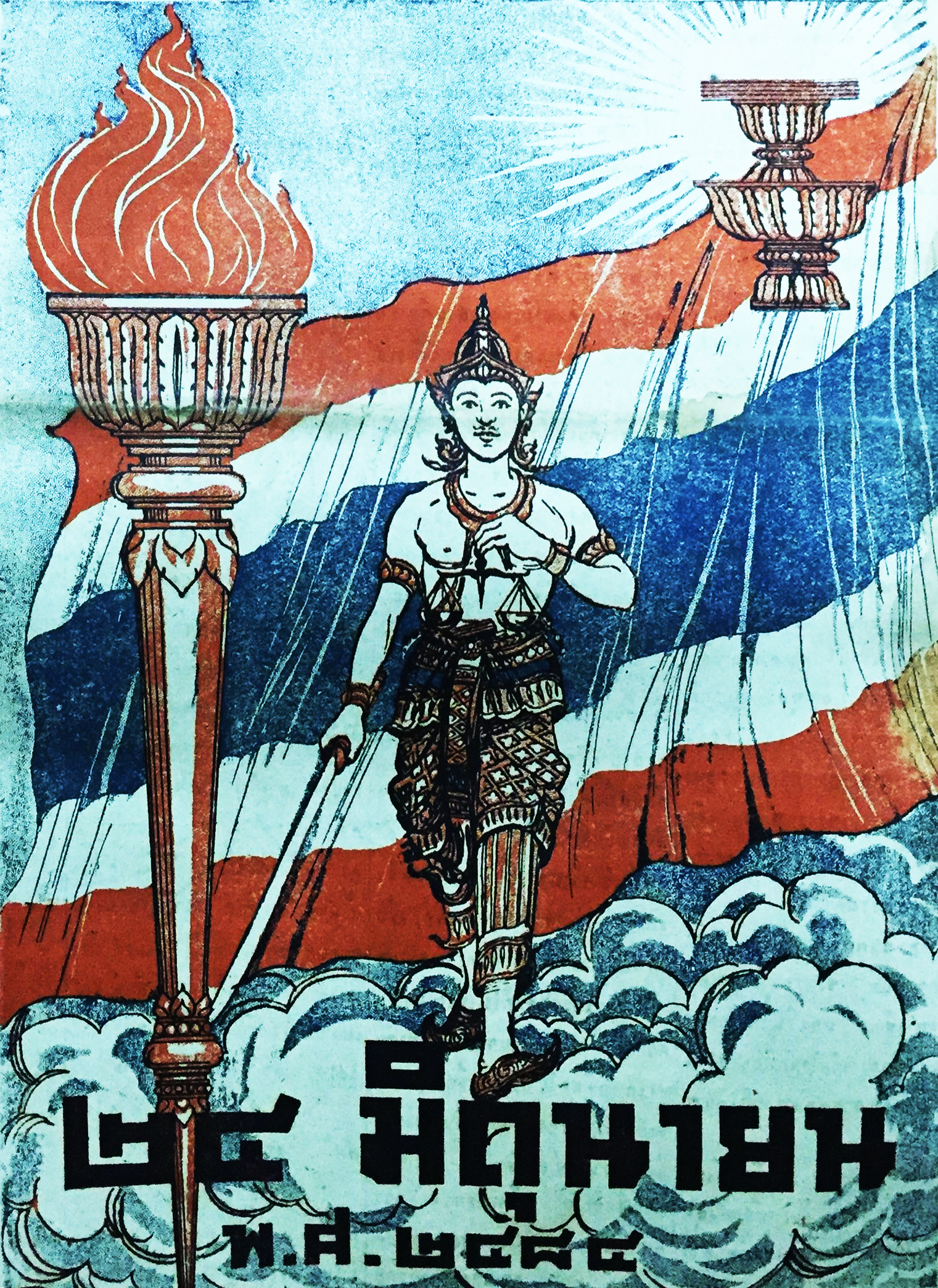
National Day of Thailand artwork by Srikrung 1941

In 1932, the People's Party carried out the Siamese revolution on 24 June, in which they successfully replaced the country's absolute monarchy with a constitutional one. The government of the People's Party supported the recognition of 24 June as a "day of national importance". On 18 July 1938, Phraya Phahonphonphayuhasena, head of the People's Party who was the then prime minister, announced that 24 June be observed as the National Day.

At a meeting of the House of Representatives on 25 March 1939, Waelae Ben-a-bat, member of the House from Yala province, requested the House to fix the date of commencement of a legislative session, and it was proposed that the date should be 24 June in commemoration of the said revolution. The proposal was opposed by In Singhanet, member of the House from Chiang Mai province, who said that the revolution was a treason against the monarchy, not something to be commemorated, and he proposed that the session should instead commence on 27 June, the date the first constitution was granted by King Prajadhipok. This led to heated arguments at the meeting, prompting In to withdraw his own proposal. But the House proceeded to remove him from membership with a vote of 113 to 15, stating that his speech "was made with an ill intention to cause the public to despise the constitutional government and shows that the speaker does not actually believe in the democratic administration, despite having affirmed to do so before taking office."

In 1939, the 24 June National Day was nationally celebrated for the first time with great pomp and circumstance under the government of Field Marshal Plaek Phibunsongkhram. On the same day, the Phibunsongkhram government also announced renaming the country from Siam to Thailand and premiered the "National Day's Song" (Thai: เพลงวันชาติ), which was composed by Montri Tramote and won a government-organised competition.

On 28 February 1940, the Phibunsongkhram administration announced 23, 24, and 25 June to be consecutive public holidays every year to commemorate the National Day. On 6 August 1948, these holidays were announced to be reduced to one day, 24 June.

=== 5 December ===
On 21 May 1960, Field Marshal Sarit Thanarat, junta leader and prime minister, announced replacing the National Day with the National Celebrations Day observed on 5 December, the birthday of King Bhumibol Adulyadej. His announcement merely stated that the National Day observed on 24 June "was inappropriate in various respects" and a committee, headed by Prince Wan Waithayakon, had been appointed to consider changing it to another day and the committee came to a conclusion that there should be a National Celebrations Day observed on 5 December instead "so that it be in line with the tradition of monarchical countries".

On 8 June 1960, the field marshal announced removing the National Day from the list of public holidays.

Later on 7 February 2017, junta leader and prime minister General Prayut Chan-o-cha announced that he had been commanded by King Vajiralongkorn to set 5 December, the birthday of Bhumibol Adulyadej, Vajiralongkorn's father, as the country's National Day, Father's Day, and Day Commemorating the Birth of King Bhumibol Adulyadej. The general's announcement gave the following as the reasons for revival of the National Day: "so that the great kindness of the king and the importance of his birthday, 5 December, would be recognised".

On 9 February 2017, Prayut announced 5 December to be a public holiday from that year on.

On 21 May 2019, King Vajiralongkorn issued a royal proclamation, without a countersignature, to repeat Prayut's 2017 announcement, ordering the nation to observe 5 December as the National Day, the Father's Day, and the Day Commemorating the Birth of King Bhumibol Adulyadej, his own father.

== Activities ==
On the 24 June National Day, grand spectacles and celebrations used to be held across the country day and night, including parades, cannon salutes on land and sea, firework displays, khon performances, religious rites, issuance of commemorative stamps, songwriting and poetry competitions, organised sounding of car horns, amongst other activities.

On the 5 December National Day, there are only activities to pay homage to King Bhumibol Adulyadej, as by laying trays of flowers and making obeisance before his portrait. During the COVID-19 pandemic, these activities were mainly held online.

Groups of people still organise public activities on 24 June every year so as to preserve the memories about the 24 June National Day and call it the "People's National Day" (Thai: วันชาติราษฎร).

== In popular culture ==
Pricha Intharapalit's novel Phon, Nikon, and Kim-nguan (Thai: พล นิกร กิมหงวน) was set during the first celebration of the 24 June National Day in 1939.

== Memorial architecture ==
- The bridge Saphan Wan Chat, Bangkok, was erected in 1940 by the government of Field Marshal Plaek Phibunsongkhram to commemorate the National Day.
- The Democracy Monument, Bangkok, was opened by Field Marshal Plaek Phibunsongkhram on the National Day in 1940.
- The Victory Monument, Bangkok, was opened by Field Marshal Plaek Phibunsongkhram on the National Day in 1942.
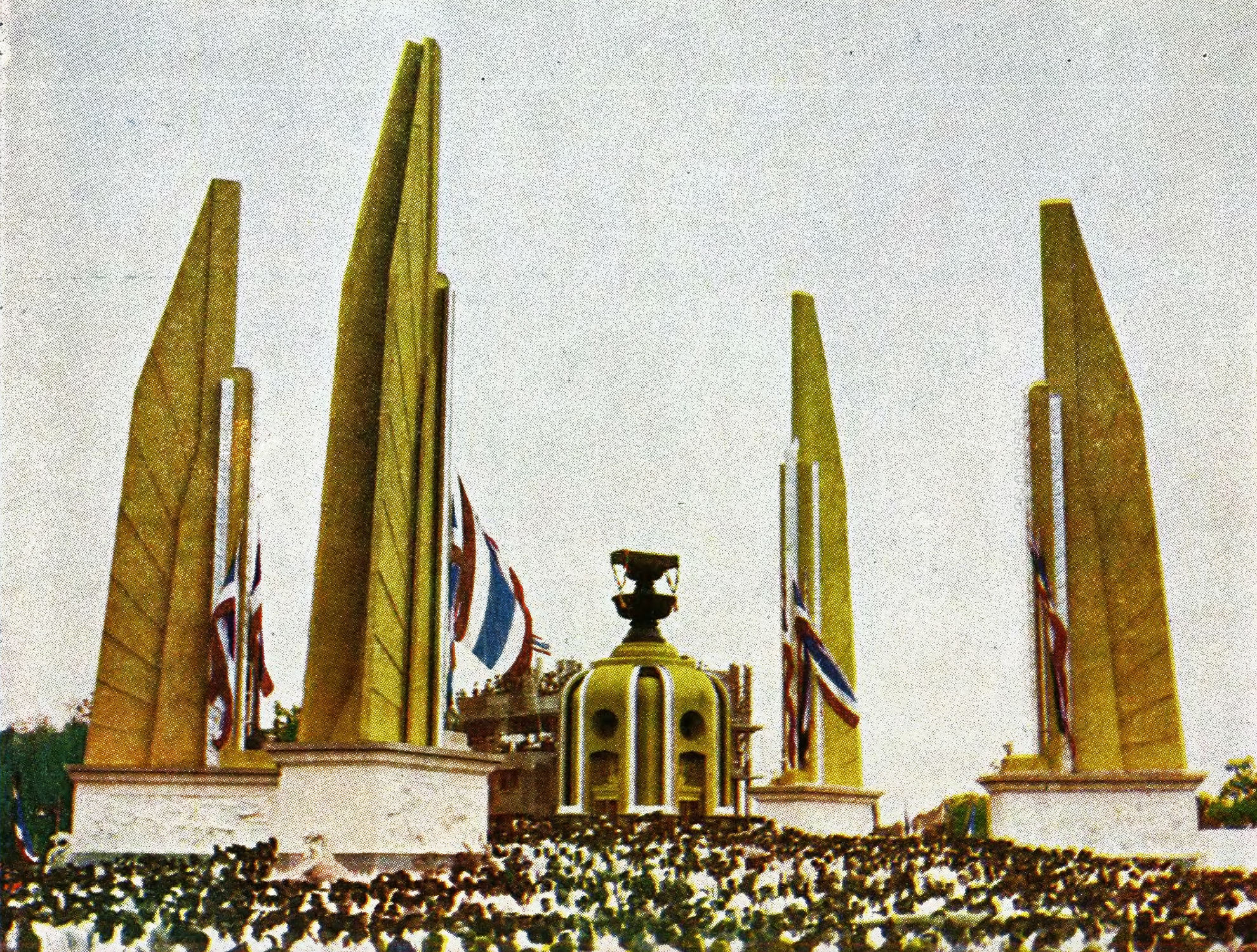
Opening of the Democracy Monument on the National Day in 1940

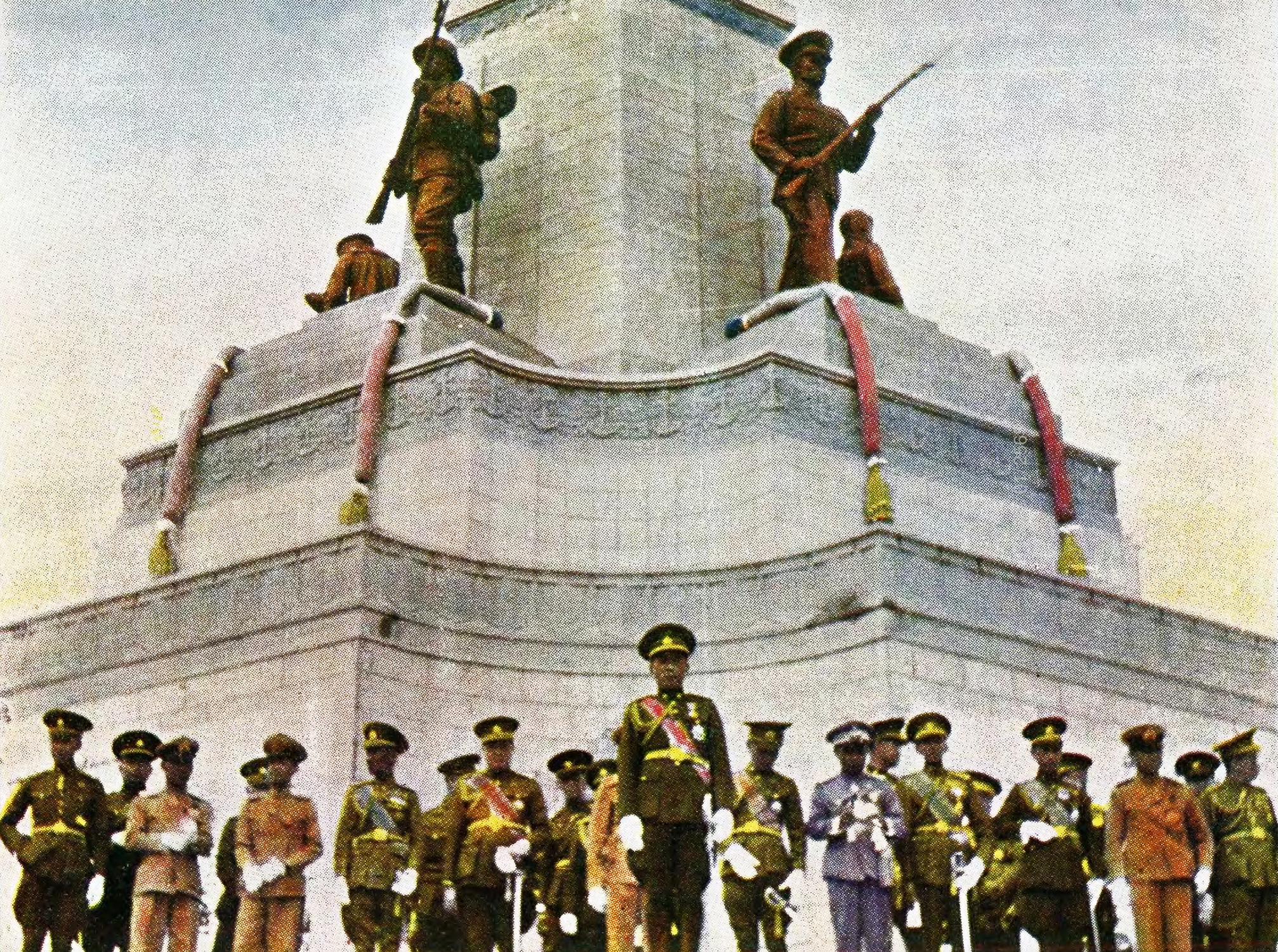
Opening of the Victory Monument on the National Day in 1942
