= Hamilton Wright =

American physician and pathologist (1867–1917)

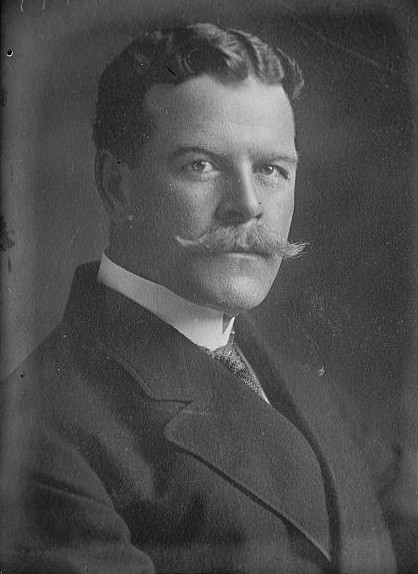
- Wright in 1909

United States Opium Commissioner
- In office July 1, 1908 – January 9, 1917
- President: Theodore Roosevelt; William Howard Taft; Woodrow Wilson
- Succeeded by: Levi G. Nutt Commissioner of Narcotics; Harry J. Anslinger Commissioner of Narcotics

Personal details
- Born: August 2, 1867 Cleveland, Ohio, U.S.
- Died: January 9, 1917 (aged 49) Washington, DC, U.S.
- Spouse: Elizabeth Washburn Wright
- Education: McGill University

Hamilton Kemp Wright (2 August 1867 – 9 January 1917) was an American physician and pathologist who served as the United States Opium Commissioner.

== Biography ==
=== Early life ===
Hamilton Wright was born in Cleveland, Ohio, on August 2, 1867. He graduated with a degree in medicine (MD CM) from McGill University in Montreal, in 1895. He served at a McGill-affiliated hospital in Montreal for one year, then spent two years in China and Japan, studying scientific, social, and economic conditions. In 1897, he received the British Medical Association Studentship for research on the nervous system. In 1900–1903, he served upon a special mission in India, studying tropical diseases. In 1900 he was appointed as the first director of the Pathological Institute located in Kuala Lumpur in the Federated Malay States (now the Institute for Medical Research). He returned to the United States in 1903.

=== Career ===
He made his name by supposedly finding a pathogen that "caused" beri-beri (before it was discovered to be a vitamin deficiency). He authored many articles and monographs on the nervous system, as well as on the social and economic problems in the tropics.

He was appointed by U.S. President Theodore Roosevelt as United States Opium Commissioner on July 1, 1908. In February 1909, he served as U.S. delegate to the International Opium Commission in Shanghai, China. He served at the follow-on conference at The Hague in 1911. He was accompanied by Charles Henry Brent, an Episcopal bishop. On March 12, 1911, Wright was quoted in an article in The New York Times: "Of all the nations of the world, the United States consumes most habit-forming drugs per capita. Opium, the most pernicious drug known to humanity, is surrounded, in this country, with far fewer safeguards than any other nation in Europe fences it with."

William Howard Taft saw that the U.S. could capitalize on the Chinese market if it would join forces with them in combating their opium problem. The problem was, the U.S. didn't have its own house in order. As a result, Wright became the first of many U.S. anti-drug crusaders. "Of all the nations of the world, the United States consumes most habit-forming drugs per capita," Wright said in 1911, calling opium "the most pernicious drug known to humanity."

In 1910, Wright sought out Vermont representative David Foster, a chairman of the House Committee on Foreign Affairs, to sponsor a bill controlling opiates, cocaine, chloral, and cannabis. The bill failed in 1911.

Wright's peers would note that his powers of persuasion were often seen as refractory and impudent, as though he was the specialist entrusted with "the interests of humanity at large".

His reputation notwithstanding, however, Wright would gain favor with the New York Democrat Francis Burton Harrison in revising the failed Foster Bill.

This bill would pass in December 1914 and came into effect on 1 March 1915 as the Harrison Act. Historians credit the passing of the bill to limited public discussion by virtue of minimal press coverage.

His wife, Elizabeth Washburne (1875-1952), continued Wright's work after his death in 1917 as an assessor to the League of Nations Opium Advisory Committee until 1920s; although, the British Foreign Office called her "incompetent, prejudiced, ignorant, and so constituted temperamentally as to afford a ready means of mischief-making."
