= Akira Ariyoshi =

Japanese diplomat (1876–1937)

Senior Third Rank Akira Ariyoshi
- 有吉 明
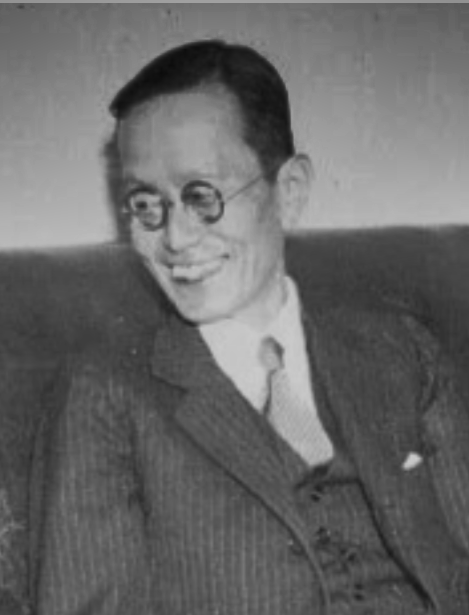

Ambassador Extraordinary and Plenipotentiary to the Republic of China
- In office May 1935 – 6 March 1936

Special and Plenipotentiary Minister to the Republic of China
- In office July 1932 – May 1935

Ambassador Extraordinary and Plenipotentiary to Brazil
- In office November 1926 – July 1930

Head Delegate to the League of Nations for Japan
- In office 2nd Session – 4th Session

Special and Foreign Minister to Switzerland
- In office April 1920 – November 1926

Consul General to Shanghai International Settlement
- In office November 1909 – September 1919

Second Secretary of the Embassy in France
- In office April 1908 – November 1909

Consular officer in Busan
- In office February 1904 – April 1908

Personal details
- Born: April 15, 1876 Tokyo, Japan
- Died: June 25, 1937 (aged 61) Tokyo, Japan
- Resting place: Yanaka Cemetery
- Relations: Chūichi Ariyoshi (brother); Minoru Ariyoshi (brother); Iwao Yamazaki (nephew)
- Education: Kyoto Prefectural Commercial School
- Alma mater: Tokyo Higher School of Commerce
- Awards: Grand Cordon of the Order of the Rising Sun; Order of the Sacred Treasure; Order of Brilliant Jade

Akira Ariyoshi (有吉 明, Ariyoshi Akira; 15 April 1876 – 25 June 1937) was a Japanese diplomat during the Shōwa era. He was the first ever diplomat from Japan to China to hold the rank of Ambassador Plenipotentiary.

== Biography ==
He is one of the foundational figures of the League of Nations, being assigned as Japan's Head Delegate to its 2nd session. He was Japan's representative at many committees of the League, including being present for the creation of the Opium Advisory Committee (OAC). During his time spent as the Japanese plenipotentiary in Brazil, Ariyoshi argued fervently against expansion into the Amazon rainforest, which he considered a sacred place, and advocated for a policy of what he called concretization: building where you already exist. Aryioshi also came into a contentious relationship with the Kaigai Kogyo Kaisha (Overseas Emigration Institute), the Japanese organization dedicated to Japanese settlements in Brazil, informing the Brazilian government and his own that this type of mass settlement would create great anti-Japanese sentiments in Brazilian society.

While in China, Ariyoshi preferred soft power over military action, forming a friendship with the General Zhang Xueliang and other Chinese Generals sympathetic to the Japanese, but Ariyoshi also served here at the pleasure of Minister Hirosi Saito, which was a complex and contentious relationship. He had also formed friendships with Chiang Kai-shek and Wang Jingwei. Especially in the years leading up to the Second Sino-Japanese War, Ariyoshi was opposed Japanese military action in China, and retired in 1936 out of protest. However, he died less than a year later.

== See also ==
- Paek Chŏnggi, the leader of an attempted assassination targeting Ariyoshi
