= Opiumregie =

State monopoly over Opium in the Dutch East Indies (1898–1942)

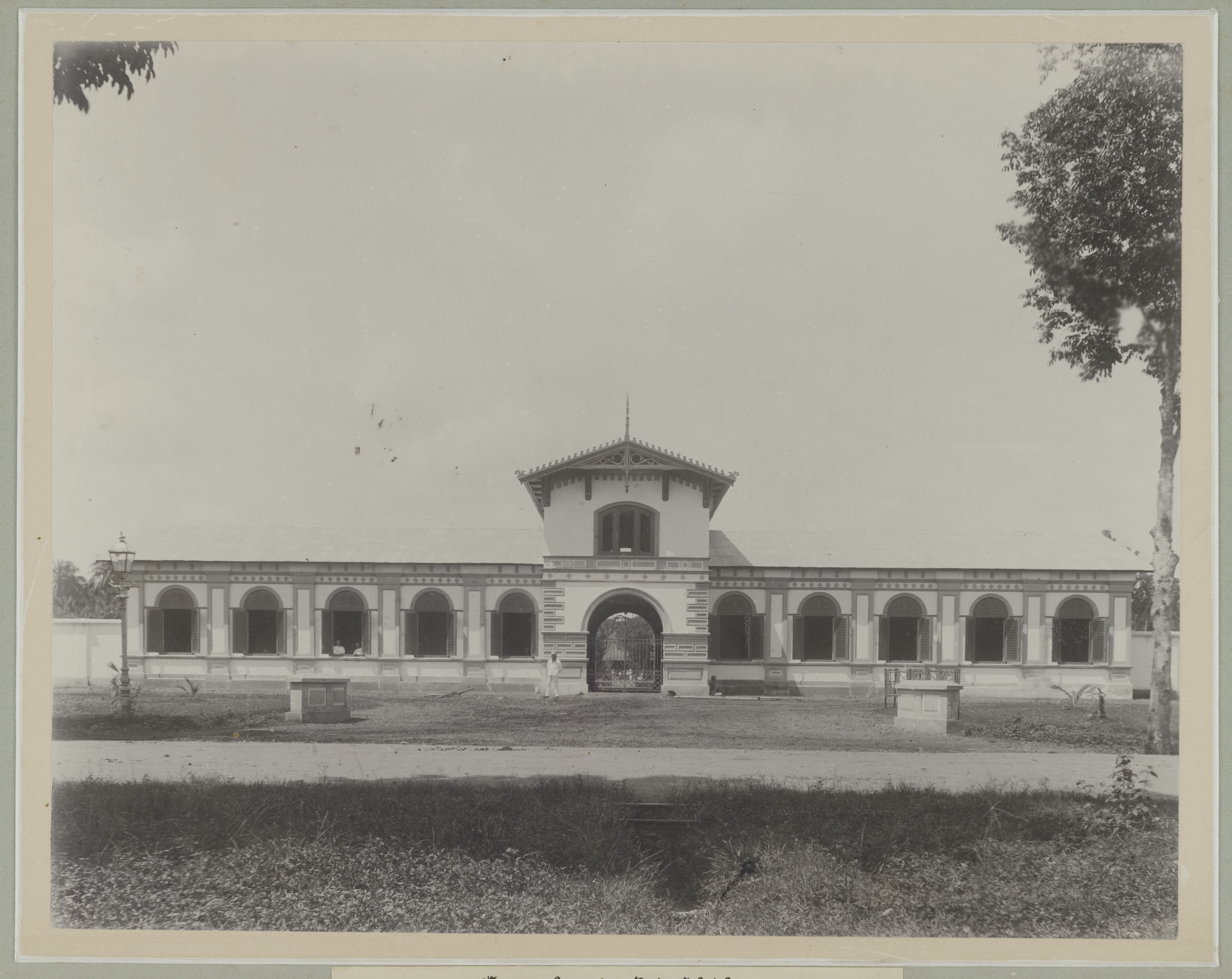
- Central Opium processing factory, c. 1935. There are Media related to Batavia Opium Factory at Wikimedia Commons.

Agency overview
- Formed: 1893
- Preceding agencies: • Amfioensocietëit; • Amfioen Directie; • Opiumpacht
- Dissolved: 1942 (Japanese invasion)
- Jurisdiction: Dutch East Indies
- Headquarters: Batavia, Java
- Minister responsible: Netherlands Minister of Finance (after 1934)
- Agency executives: Hendrik Johannes Hooghwinkel, Chief of the Opiumregie; Arie Arend de Jongh, Chief of the Opiumregie; Willem Gideon van Wettum, Chief Inspector of the Opiumregie; Dr. C. Ph. C.E. Steinmetz, Chief of the Opiumregie; P. de Booy, Chief of the Opium-en-zoutregie
- Parent department: Office for Opium Affairs (dienst der opium aangelegenheden); Netherlands Colonies Office
- Child agencies: Opium police force; Opium naval police

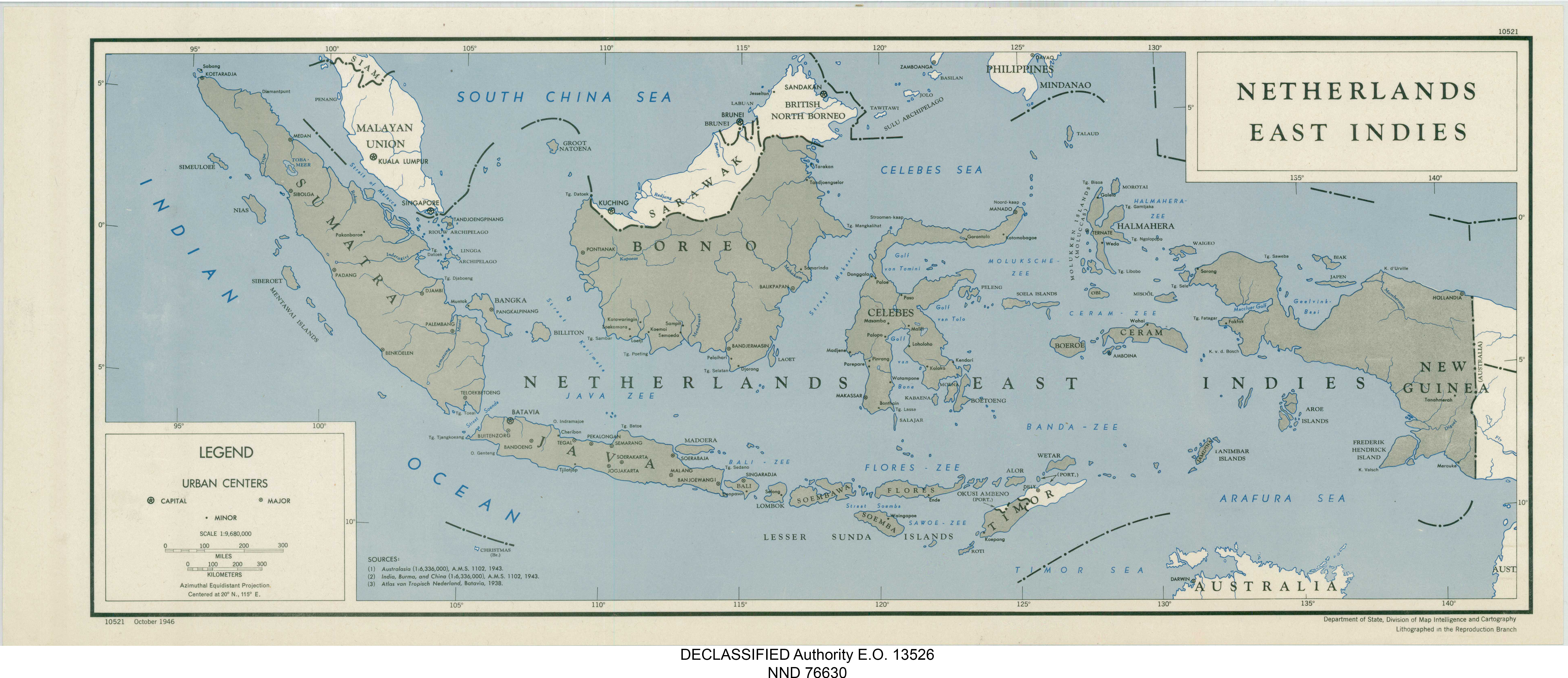
Map of the Dutch East Indies

The Opiumregie (incorrectly translated as the Opium Regime), also known in some official international documentation as the Opium Monopoly of the Dutch East Indies, was a colonial state government agency of market intervention responsible for the management, distribution, importation, and production of opium, and the enforcement of laws related to opium, in the Dutch East Indies. In simplest terms, as a monopoly, the Opiumregie made and sold opium, but also made sure that no one else could sell opium in the Dutch East Indies. The Opiumregie was one of three government monopolies the Dutch government of the Netherlands held in the Dutch East Indies at this time, the other two being in the areas of salt and pawnbrokerage.

== History ==
The concept of moving the islands from the era of Opiumpacht (the Cultivation System opium monopoly) into Opiumregie was the brainchild of Willem Pieter Groeneveldt.

The laws establishing the Opiumregie were passed in 1893, and their implementation was overseen largely by the administration of Colonial Governor-General Aart van der Wijck, but its organizational development occurred over several distinct phases. The first experimental Opiumregie started in 1898 in a singular district on the island of Madura. In 1902, the Opiumregie established a processing factory in Batavia, and from there, they established distribution centers wherein they sold the drugs. By 1903, the government had implemented an Opiumregie in all of the districts of Java and Madura. The Netherlands weren't in control of the southern portion of Bali until 1906, when they launched the Dutch intervention in Bali to conquer the island, specifically because it was exporting opium into Java without registering with the Opiumregie. It wasn't until 1914 that the Outer Islands of the Dutch East Indies fully came under the jurisdiction of the Opiumregie. At its height, the Opiumregie was distributing from its central production factories to 1110 distribution centers across the archipelago.

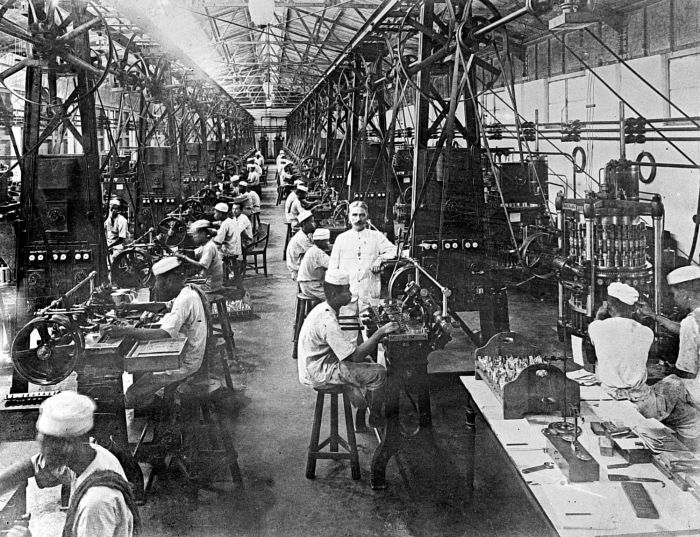
Central Opiumregie processing factory in Batavia, at Weltevreden, c. 1935. The former building is now part of the campus of the University of Indonesia Institute of Economic Management.

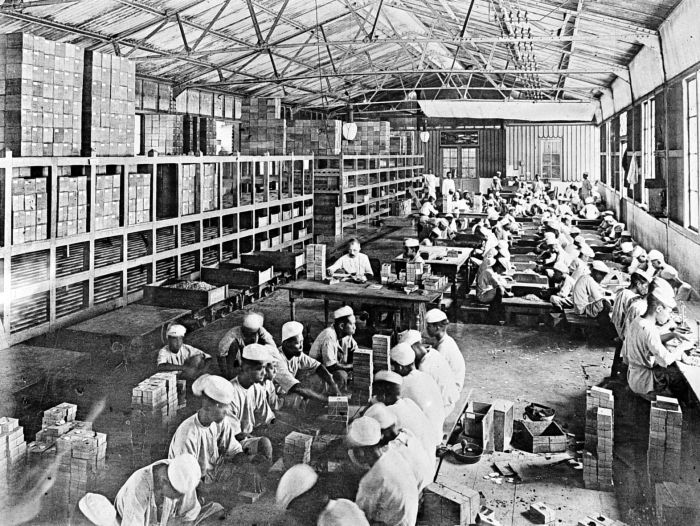
Central Opiumregie processing factory in Batavia, c. 1935.

Initially, the Opiumregie sold four types of opium: raw opium, opium pills, tikee (opium mixed with ficus septica), and tjandoe (smoking opium). However, after 1917, the government was worried that locals were mixing opium with "dangerous psychotropic drugs" called marijuana and tobacco, and in an effort to curtail the consumption of cannabis, primarily sold mostly tjandoe in the Dutch East Indies after that point. In effect, because the Dutch controlled the supply and consumption of opium in the Dutch East Indies, the Opiumregie has been called "the largest opium cartel in the world." The historian Hans Derks argues that the Opiumregie, being directly responsible for a series of military conquest campaigns across the islands, was also worse than its predecessors in the VOC or the NHM, especially given the fact that the Europeans were mostly under the assumption during this era that smoking opium was morally wrong.

Despite the fact the Netherlands passed the Opium Act in 1919, the language of this law only prohibited the consumption of opium "in the Kingdom of the Netherlands in Europe." Elsewhere in the Kingdom, and primarily the colony of the Dutch East Indies, the Kingdom desired an increase in profit.

In 1934, the Saltregie (the salt monopoly, also known as the "zoutregie") became a collaborative partner of the Opiumregie, because in the Dutch East Indies, the definition of "salt" from that date included "salts and other derivatives from morphine, diacetylmorphine, and cocaine." The name of the newly combined monopoly effort was the Opium-en-zoutregie.

On paper, despite the fact that the Opiumregie was selling opium, they were also officially responsible by law to reduce consumption in the colony. Therefore, the Opiumregie also managed a force of Narcotics Inspectors, acting as federal law enforcement agents across the islands. Their responsibilities were also to ensure that there weren't any private vendors of opium in the islands, and that those who did consume the products did so in the appropriate locations, and with the appropriate licenses. On certain islands – especially those populated primarily by Muslims – the consumption of opium was banned outright, but on other islands the consumption of opium was allowed, and could be legally purchased from the Opiumregie. The Chief of the Opiumregie, Arie Arend de Jongh, was sent to attend the first International Opium Commission. His successor at the League of Nations was the Chief Inspector W.G. van Wettum (brother of the sinologist B.A.J. van Wettum), who was present at the establishment of the Opium Advisory Committee (OAC).

The Opiumregie also created a strong naval police force, with the mandated powers to seize vessels at sea and search them for opium.

The Opiumregie collapsed during the Japanese invasion of the Dutch East Indies.
