= Charoonsakdi Kritakara =

Diplomat for the King of Siam (now called Thailand)

HRH Prince Charoonsakdi Kritakara
- พระองค์เจ้าจรูญศักดิ์กฤดากร
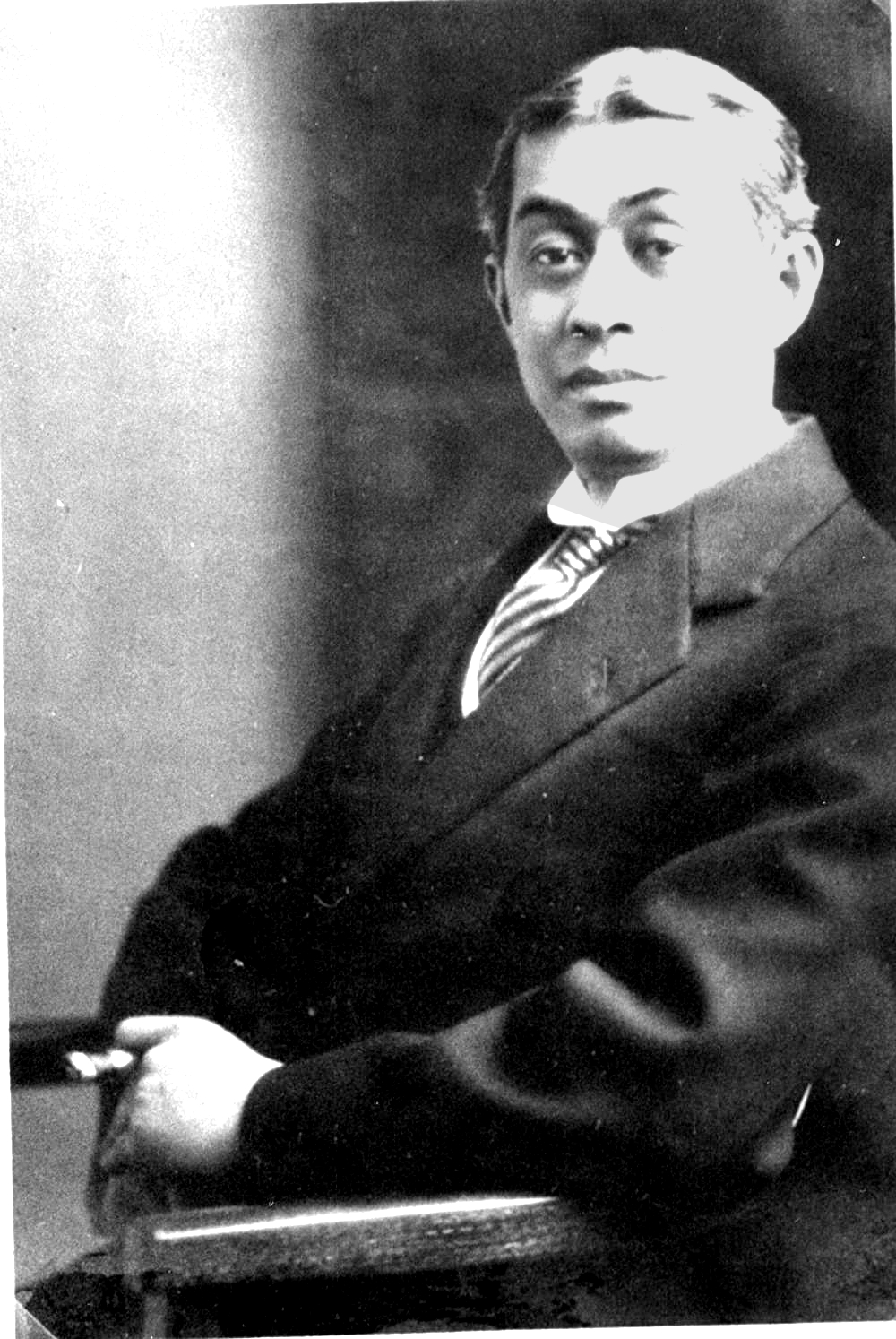

Head Delegate to the League of Nations
- In office January 10, 1920 – October 5, 1928
- Monarchs: Vajiravudh; Prajadhipok
- Delegation: Kingdom of Siam
- Succeeded by: Prince Wan Waithayakorn

Ambassador Plenipotentiary
- In office June 28, 1912 – October 5, 1928
- Monarchs: Vajiravudh; Prajadhipok
- Embassy: Paris

Kingdom of Siam Minister of Justice
- In office January 27, 1910 – 1912
- Monarchs: Chulalongkorn; Vajiravudh
- Preceded by: Raphi Phatthanasak
- Succeeded by: Chao Phraya Abhairaja Maha Yuttithammathorn (Lop Suthat)

Kingdom of Siam Deputy Minister of Justice
- In office July 14, 1909 – January 27, 1910
- Monarch: Chulalongkorn

Ambassador and Chargé d'affaires
- In office September 7, 1906 – July 12, 1909
- Monarch: Chulalongkorn
- Embassies: Paris, Rome, Madrid, Lisbon

Governor of Songkhla
- In office ?–?

Personal details
- Born: July 2, 1875 Phra Nakhon Province, Siam
- Died: October 5, 1928 (aged 53) Geneva, Switzerland
- Parent: Father: Nares Varariddhi
- Education: Harrow School
- Alma mater: University of Cambridge
- Awards: Ratana Varabhorn Order of Merit; Order of Chula Chom Klao; Order of the White Elephant; Order of the Crown of Thailand; Vallabhabhorn Order; Dushdi Mala Medal; เหรียญรัตนาภรณ์
- Known as: Prince Charoon; Charunsak Kridakon; Charoensak Kridakon; Charunsakdi Kridakorn

Military service
- Branch/service: Wild Tiger Corps
- Rank: Sergeant Major

Prince Charoonsakdi Kritakara, (several Romanized spellings exist), more commonly known in English as Prince Charoon, was the Kingdom of Siam delegate to the League of Nations, being present at its inception in 1920 for a duration of eight years until he died in 1928. Prior to the creation of the League, Prince Charoon was also a delegate to the Paris Peace Conference following World War I. This was as a result of the fact that Siam had contributed an expeditionary force to the European continent to fight in the war for the Allies. Charoon, incidentally, alongside Prince Chakrabongs, was primarily responsible for Siam's contribution to the war: the two convinced the King to contribute forces, and to "make a show of it." In an interview with The Christian Science Journal in 1917, Charoon said: "By joining the Allies, Siam is adding very little, but still it is adding a little, to the allied forces." Charoon was a signatory to the Treaty of Versailles. As the grandson of Mongkut (who had 39 sons), he was born a Prince, but the title of His Royal Highness wasn't bestowed upon him until 1912, over a decade after he entered public service. Charoon was a graduate of the University of Cambridge, much to the dismay of his uncle, Svatsi, who had been the first Thai to ever attend the University of Oxford. Charoon has been called one of the "Makers of the modern world." Charoon was also a delegate to the Opium Advisory Committee, being present at its very first meeting, and contributing to the global effort against opium consumption. In 1906, Charoon was also an attendee at the First Geneva Convention, while serving as the Kingdom's Chargé d'affaires in Paris. In 1925, Charoon signed a peace treaty with the French. Charoon's signature can be found on many other League of Nations documents, as he took leadership roles in many committees during his time there. Charoon is also indirectly responsible for the creation of Chakri Day. At age 53, Prince Charoon died on the job of heart disease in Geneva.
