= Gaston Kahn =

French diplomat in and near China (1864–1928)

- Kahn in the French Consulate of Shanghai in 1905

Delegate to the Opium Advisory Committee
- In office 1921 – May 22, 1928

Inspector General of Diplomatic and Consular Posts
- In office post-1918

Minister Plenipotentiary for Bangkok
- In office 1918

Consul General for London
- In office November, 1916 – 1918

Consul General for the French Concession of Shanghai
- In office 10 December 1912 – 1915
- Preceded by: Dejean de la Batie

Consul General for the French Concession of Tianjin
- In office 1909–1912
- Preceded by: Dejean de la Bâtie

Consul General for the French Concession of Canton
- In office 1904–1906

Consul for the French Embassy at Hoihow
- In office ?–?

Personal details
- Born: September 29, 1864 3rd arrondissement, Paris
- Died: May 22, 1928 (aged 63) 15th arrondissement, Paris
- Education: Institut national des langues et civilisations orientales
- Awards: Legion of Honour

Camille Gaston Kahn was a French diplomat and colonial administrator for the French Colonial Empire in Southeast Asia and China. He settled several major diplomatic disputes between China and the French Empire, increased the size of the French Concession of Shanghai, medeatied the peace between warring parties after several revolutions, and improved the living conditions of the Colonial residents in the areas under his control. Several streets were named after him in the French Concessions of Tianjin, Shanghai, and elsewhere.

== History ==
Kahn was brought up in what was called, in French, a "petty middle-class Jewish family." He was educated in several Eastern languages at the National Institute of Oriental Languages and Cultures. In 1886, shortly after the French conquest of Tonkin, and the creation of the Protectorate of Tonkin, Kahn was posted to his first overseas assignment there as the assistant and interpreter to the Inspector of Franco-Annamite Schools. By January 1897, records place him as the French Consul of Hoihow, in the island province of Hainan. While he was here in Hainan, Kahn was the co-chair of the Sino-French Commission alongside Véran Dejoux, the Consul of Pakhoi. This commission was set up to negotiate with the Chinese to settle the terms they had laid against Auguste Raphael Marty and the Tonkin Shipping Company.

In 1898, Kahn was present for the French takeover and raising of the flag of the fort at Xiying.

In 1904, Kahn took up his first responsibilities as a Consul General in his first French Concession, that of the French Concession of Canton. While the name "Consul General" is shared among many diplomatic posts around the world, at this time the French Consul Generals of the Concessions had powers akin to those of Territorial Governors: they had the authority to write and impose laws, were the highest ranking French officials in the Concession, and oftentimes were even in charge of the police forces or militias. When he arrived at Canton, he came into a heated argument with the French contracting company that had been assigned to build a railroad in the area. He ridiculed their efforts, wondering aloud and on paper why they were more concerned with the race of their employees than the outcome of the project. Kahn nearly was able to force the railroad company to upkeep with modern labor practices to have them improve labor conditions, and begin drafting contracts for employees to review, but the company outmaneuvered him.

There is presently a gap in the records between 1906 and 1909.

In 1909, Kahn was appointed Consul General of the French Concession of Tianjin. The 1911 Revolution occurred while he was in this post. In Tianjin, he drafted the Recueil des Reglements Municipaur 1912, which was especially concerned with implementing a system for permitting building applications with regards to safety in construction. He ensured that all new buildings in the Concession were kept up to this code, which included regulations on eaves, protrusions, smoke ducts, firewalls, and other measures against fire.

At the end of 1912 (not in 1913, as some sources claim), Kahn was assigned the responsibility as the Consul General for the French Concession of Shanghai. This is perhaps his most notable experience as Consul General. Immediately upon entering Shanghai, Kahn ensured the removal of the municipal Chief of Police Mallet after a disagreement with the man in Kahn's office. He set about towards improving relationships with the Municipal Council, and also repaired his predecessor's damaged relationship with the police force itself. He brought with him those same fire protection measures he had overseen in Tianjin, and also brought buildings up to code.

However, perhaps is most notable act during his time here was his conducting of the negotiations that would lead to a vast increase in the size of the territory of the concession. Concurrently with developments in the building codes, the French Concession of Shanghai was in the process of laying out roads and putting down tram lines. The French settlers in the Concession were expanding westward into some of the International Settlement, and in 1913, Kahn decided to enter into negotiations with the Chinese about acquiring new territory. On April 8, 1914, Kahn signed a treaty with the Chinese Foreign Affairs Minister Yang Sheng to increase the size of the French Concession of Shanghai by 15 times its land area. From that point, the French portion of Shanghai was no longer a small neighborhood, it would become an even more dominant hub of economic activity in China, and one of France's "pearls of the Orient."

In November 1916, it was announced that Kahn would become the Consul General of the French Embassy in London. While this was a downgrade in the power and force that the position held, it was also an elevation in status for him, as it meant visibility among the Western European elite classes.

Shortly afterward, in 1918, he was appointed minister plenipotentiary in Bangkok, in the Kingdom of Siam.

At some point, he was brought back to Paris, and made the inspector general of diplomatic and consular posts, head of the inspection service of all French works abroad, reporting directly to the Foreign Minister.

He also represented France at the League of Nations, and especially was present for the creation of the Opium Advisory Committee (OAC). He was assigned to be the French representative on the OAC in 1921.
