= International Opium Commission =

1909 international meeting in Shanghai to regulate the global drug trade

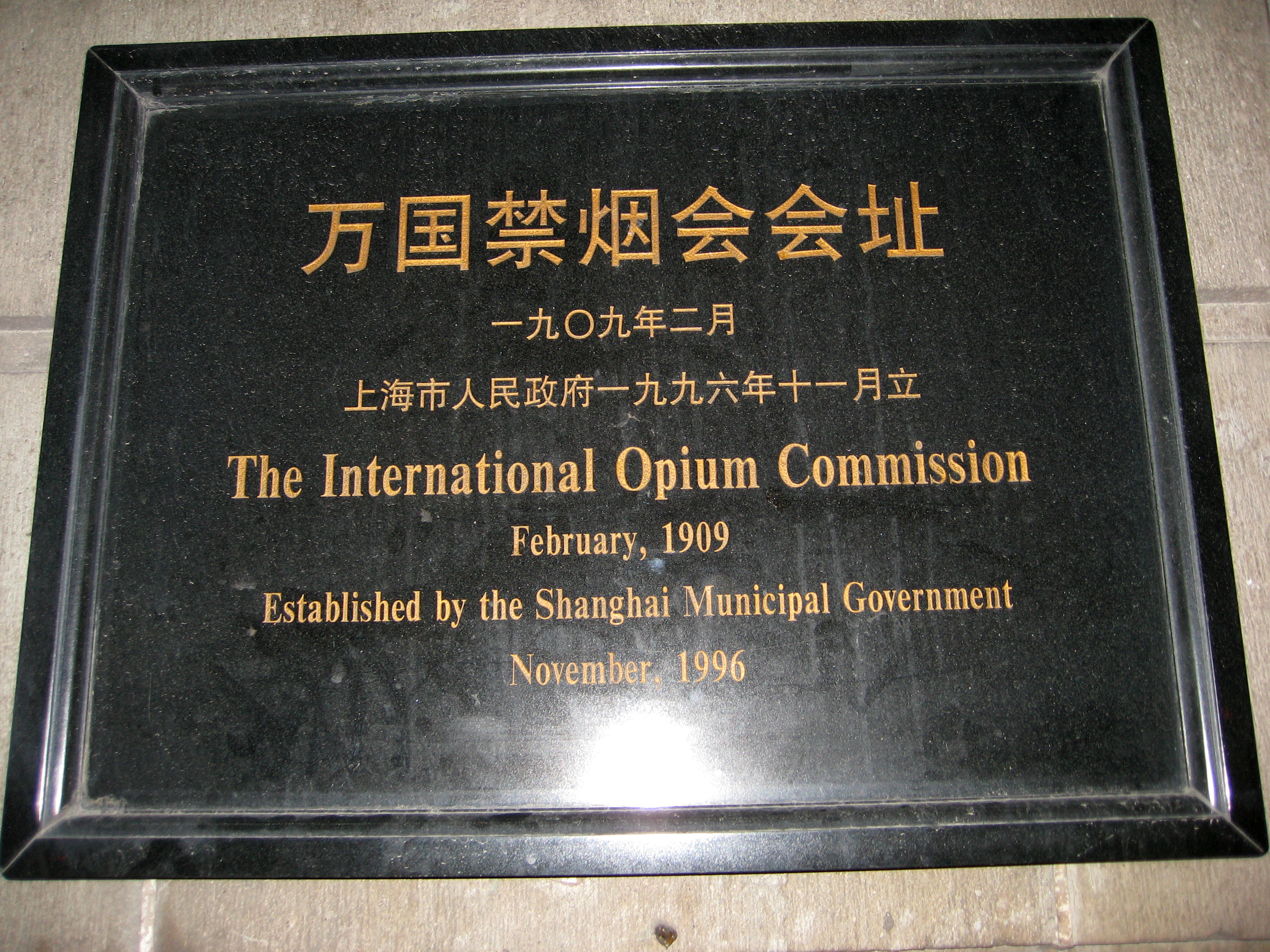
A plaque outside the Peace Hotel which commemorates the meeting.

The International Opium Commission was a meeting convened on February 1 to February 26, 1909, in Shanghai that was one of the first steps toward international drug prohibition.

== History ==
Hamilton Wright and Charles Henry Brent headed the U.S. delegation. Brent was elected president of the commission.

The meeting was designated a 'commission' rather a conference, although this was the preference of the United States. Having the status of a conference would have given it the power to draft regulations to which signatory states would be bound by international law". The commission was only authorized to make recommendations.

According to Paul S. Reinsch, the commission made these suggestions in its final resolution:

It is the duty of all countries to adopt reasonable measures to prevent the departure of shipments of opium to any country which prohibits its entry; that drastic measures should be taken by each government in its own territories to control the manufacture, sale, and distribution of the drug; that all governments possessing settlements in China shall take effective action toward the closing of opium divans in the said settlements.

The meeting united the attending nations behind the cause of opium prohibition, leading to the First International Opium Convention held in 1912.

== See also ==
- Hampden Coit DuBose, American missionary
