= Opium Regie =

Colonial state opium monopoly in French Indochina (1881–1945)

- Régie de l'opium
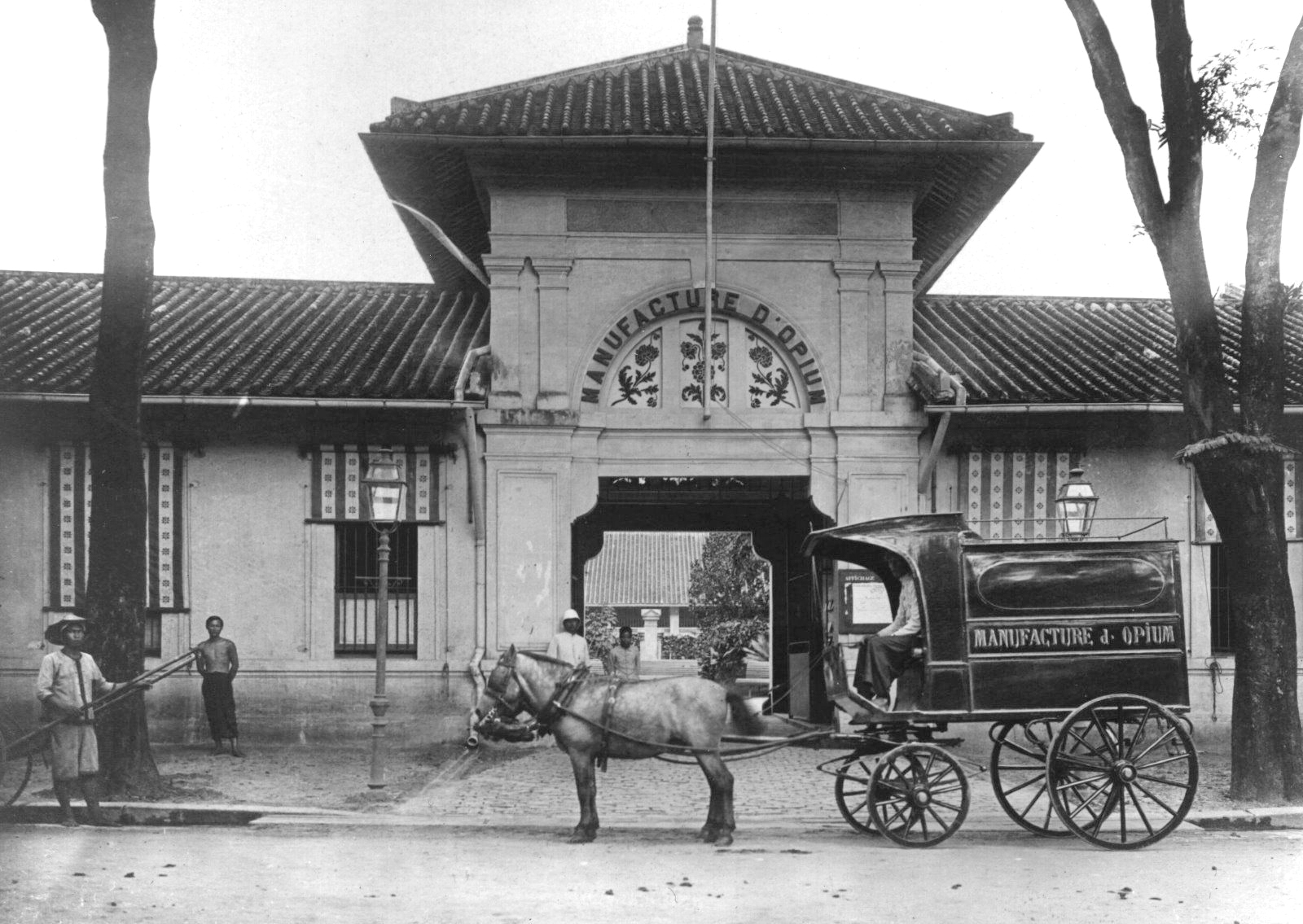
- The Opium Manufacturing Factory of Saigon was constructed in 1881.

Agency overview
- Formed: Cochinchina: February 20, 1881; French Indochina: October 6, 1897
- Preceding agency: Second Opium War
- Dissolved: 1945
- Jurisdiction: French Indochina
- Minister responsible: Director of Customs and Revenue

Map
- French Indochina
- Founded by: Charles Le Myre de Vilers Expanded by: Paul Doumer

The Opium Regie (incorrectly translated as the Opium Regime) was the French colonial state government monopoly over opium, first developed as the Régie de l'opium in the colony of French Cochinchina, and later as the Régie General de l'opium in the whole of French Indochina. Opium, alongside salt and alcohol, was used as a tool of financial debt and asset management by the French, in order to subjugate and pacify the region's economies and bring the local monarchs under the umbrella of the French Empire, and those that weren't, as trading partners. After several decades of establishing a market for the product using third party entrepreneurs, in 1897, the Opium Regie was mandated to control the import, export, and sales of all opium in the colony. Throughout the colony, the Opium Regie managed state-owned distribution centers, warehouses, opium dens, and processing factories. Opium was also publicly available for purchase in bistros, restaurants, coffeehouses, and other establishments, all legally supplied by the Opium Regie. All other sources of opium in the colony were considered illegal contraband, and those selling that contraband were legally defined as smugglers. Later, in 1908, when Western European attitudes regarding opium consumption shifted, and laws were passed prohibiting its consumption there, those smugglers who had established networks into Europe would be labeled "drug dealers," giving rise to the notion of a global French Connection, but at the same time, the colony did not cease its sales or production of opium, much the opposite. By 1914, opium sales made up 40% of the colony's revenue. The Regie's primary competition in the region was with the Chinese opium farmers of Yunnan, without whom their new monopoly would not have been possible to develop, and of whom the French colonists despised.

In 1925, upon a visit to an opium manufacturing facility owned by the Opium Regie, the famous American screenwriter Harry Hervey wrote the following:

"It is, perhaps, impertinent for a visitor to criticize a country, particularly when his sojourn there was a matter of months instead of years. But this is not intended entirely as a criticism of France’s policy in this Asiatic colony. It is broader than that. It is giving a specific example to illustrate the policies of all nations who maintain colonial possessions. France is no worse than the other countries who control foreign territory, and she is better than most. But her principle, as proved by the Régie d’Opium if nothing else, is the principle of one who offers protection and substitutes exploitation. We of the West are humanitarians outside theory until the skin changes color, then we are altruistic; and our weapon is conversion through acquisition."

== History ==
=== Expansion of French opium production ===
It was around the height of the Conquest of Cochinchina in 1861, shortly after the conclusion of the Second Opium War, that the French Empire began to implement a system of opium farming and trade leasing into French Cochinchina, the colony that would eventually become the southernmost colony of French Colonial Indochina. The Opium farming system, as it was known in this colony (the British and Dutch colonies also had farming systems), heavily integrated subcontractors on a temporary basis, who would hold the Colonial warrant for opium. The Empire leased a farm tract, and therein the monopoly for the opium trade in the colony, for an annual fee of 92,000 piastres to two French colonial farmers. However, in an act of rebellion, the indigenous population of the colony raided the farm and killed their employees. Opium trading posts were also raided and their storekeepers were killed. Within a year, the colonial government, unsatisfied with the earnings from the farm, repossessed the land and arrested the two farmers on the suspicion of defrauding the state. Meanwhile, the "illicit" opium coming in from Yunnan (which the French had ensured would be legalized within China during the Opium Wars), the Golden Triangle, and India was being sold at a cheaper market rate than government-sponsored opium.

In 1864, the government moved away from the farm leasing system, and into an auction-bid system for opium farms and factories, where the government would award outright the winner of an auction, and in exchange, would collect taxes on that business. This system was known as Régie intérèse. Also in 1864, a Chinese company, Wang Tay, won the contract to construct the peninsula's first opium manufacturer in a place called Cholon. Following Wang Tay, the Chinese company of Fockien also developed an opium farm on the peninsula.

For nearly two decades under this system, Chinese and French entrepreneurs were forced to outbid each other for the rights to opium monopolies in various districts of Cochinchina. Most often, Chinese bidders would outmaneuver the French at auction, and their trading empire grew into the dominant one on the peninsula. Over time, the Colonial government granted these companies the rights to establish vast trade networks across their colony, to sell and distribute opium, and to set up trading posts – as long as the Colonial government maintained an ultimate fiscal and market control over the revenues and taxations. These Chinese entrepreneurs, based out of Cholon, formed their networks through familial associations that stretched along the coast and ancient walking trails that meandered through the highlands. Through this, the Chinese immigrants eventually became the dominant merchant class of the colony, and also obtained the majority of guild and tradecraft jobs in their network, from Cholon to the interior. The Chinese also became the dominant practitioners of the rice industry and the tobacco industry in the region.

Despite the fact that they had invested more into the opium venture than any other crop in Cochinchina at this point, the admiral-governors of Cochinchina were not satisfied with their earnings from opium in these years, and often the production of hops and their distillation yielded far greater returns on investment. However, because alcohol was more ubiquitous than opium, it would be much more difficult to create a true monopoly over the trade and consumption of it in the colony. The management of the alcohol monopolies in the region by the French for the next seventy years was eventually considered to be even more damaging to the local psyche than the opium trade, because, as the colonial and local thinking went: only the Chinese consumed opium, but everyone in the peninsula consumed alcohol. This line of thought was later proved to be incorrect, and based more in the racialized impetus of the colonial system – neither system was incredibly profitable, but they were supremely effective methods of creating subservient debt economies.

=== The Opium Regie of French Cochinchina ===
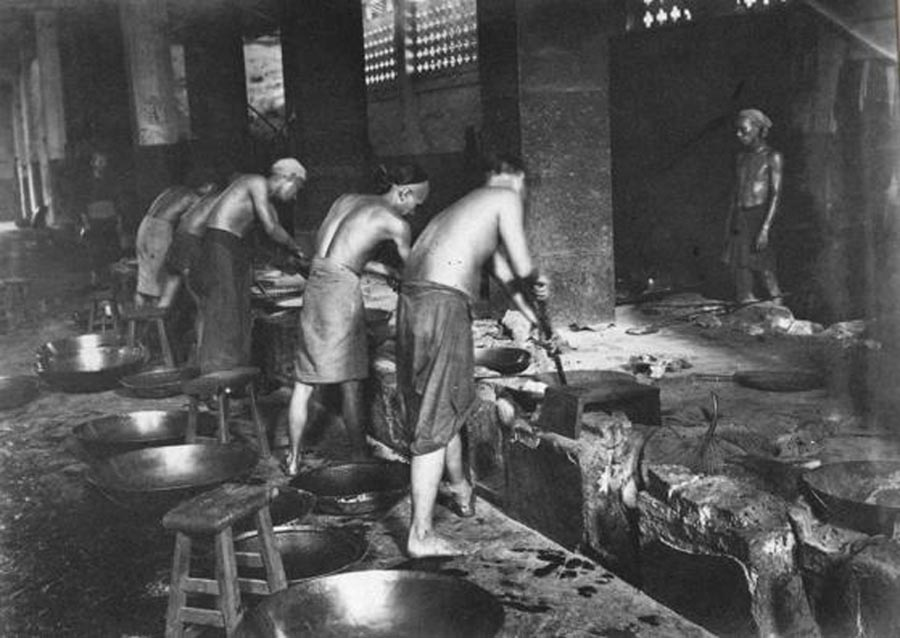
Interior of the Opium Manufacturer of Saigon (Manufacture d'Opium), owned and operated by the Régie de l'opium.

In 1881, Charles Le Myre de Vilers called a meeting of the Colonial Council of Cochinchina, in which they concocted new ideas for the management and taxation of various crops, but especially opium. The Council, composed of mostly Frenchmen, and some "assimilated" local aristocracy, debated heavily between one of two options going forward: the first option being to revamp the farming system with the aid of the dominant Chinese merchanters, and the second being to completely abolish the private enterprise system and build a state-owned opium monopoly. The Council chose the later option. This new monopoly would be called the Régie de l'opium.

These ideas of monopoly were also forming alongside a new conception of colonial management in the area. Especially of interest to the local assimilated aristocracy were an abundance of ideas about how to wrestle away control over the trade networks that had been established by the Chinese, and place them firmly into the grips of a new colonial Viet merchant class, raising their stature and status significantly. Furthermore, the ethnic Vietnamese on the Council parlayed a heavy accusation against the practices of the Chinese rice and opium trade associations: that they were almost like Triads, using the tactics of debt to force their product into rural villages in the highlands and addicting their populations in order to create a permanent demand, replicating what they had learned from the British and the French during the Opium Wars. The French were also keen on asserting once-and-for-all, their dominance over the trade.

Also in 1881, the government constructed the Opium Manufacturer of Saigon (French: La Manufacture d'Opium de Saigon), which would remain in existence until 1945. From this factory, opium was centrally processed to be prepared for sale throughout the colony, primarily targeted at the transient ethnic Chinese of the peninsula who had only shortly before been addicted to opium during the Opium Wars.

The complete transfer from the Chinese system took three years, however. In 1883, the Colonial Administration dispossessed the Chinese of their opium farms, implementing a system of Régie directe. With the stroke of a pen, the Chinese networks were made illegal – if only on paper. In reality, the Chinese businessmen that had established their networks simply were absorbed into the government, but now with the status as government employees. The Colonial government now held the exclusive right to import raw opium, which was then sold by licensed French agents – but all of those "French" agents were still primarily Chinese businessmen.

==== Expansion into other colonies ====
In 1880, the Colonial government of Cambodia had formed an agreement with the Norodom of Cambodia to grant the French company Vandelet and Dussutour the rights to grow opium in that colony. However, by 1883, the Colonial government of Cochinchina desired to completely dispossess the Monarchy of Cambodia from any revenues they generated from the sales of opium and alcohol in what was at the time only considered a French Protectorate, which still maintained relative degrees of autonomy. The French formed a plan to persuade the King to grant the Cochinchinese authorities the Cambodian royal warrant for opium production in Cambodia. This was the first step in the newly revamped French conquest of Cambodia, as it allowed the French Empire to almost completely absorb Cambodia's financial system.

Following the conquest of Cochinchina, in 1883, the French expanded into Annam and Tonkin. However, these new expansionist campaigns were even more costly, and the initial Residents-General of Annam and Tonkin experimented with new forms of opium cultivation. Especially the Resident-General Paul Bert, who failed drastically in Tonkin, and ultimately created a system of import duty collection. However, by 1888, the first French opium farms were established in Tonkin. The first 5-year management contract for this farm was awarded to a company headed by a Frenchman named René Saint-Mathurin. This farm proved to be, finally, a source of great income for the Protectorate of Tonkin (and Saint-Mathurin).

Between 1884 and 1889, however, the Emperor of Annam had managed to regain control of the opium trade in Annam, and managed to holdout against the French. However, the French eventually re-secured their monopoly in Annam.Harry Hervey writes: "And that King of Annam who, surrounded by yellow foes, appealed to France for succor, simply changed the color of his masters."

In 1887, the French conquest of Southeast Asia was mostly complete, and the protectorates combined into the newly created colony of French Indochina. Tonkin's opium production was absorbed into the Regie in 1893, organized by the Protectorate Customs Director Coqui. Two years later, the sale of opium accounted for 15% of Tonkin's revenue.

=== General Opium Regie of French Indochina ===
The critical figure in the history of the Opium Regie as we know it is the Governor-General of Indochina, Paul Doumer, who entered into office on February 13, 1897. His first general budget of 1897 completely changed French administration in Indochina forever, creating with it three new monopolies regarding the revenue sources of alcohol, salt, and opium. These monopolies would be the Régie de l'alcohol (Alcohol Regie), the Régie du sel (Salt Regie), and the Régie Géneral de l'opium. The three Regies would come to be known as "The Three Beasts of Burden," by the Colonial government. It was from that point onward that the Regie was streamlined, and was the iteration of the Regie that most would think back upon being the height of the Regie.

In 1899, he introduced a decree with 95 articles that introduced new severe punishments for smuggling. Two main private opium manufacturers were shuttered by the government; Luang Prabang in Laos and that of Haiphong in Tonkin.

== See also ==
- The Golden Triangle
- Albert Londres
