= Gunblade =

Gunblade may refer to:

- A fictional weapon in the Final Fantasy franchise
- A fictional weapon in the video game Warframe
- Pistol sword, a sword with a pistol or revolver attached
- Gunblade NY, a 1995 video game

== See also ==
- Gunsword (disambiguation)
