= Fraser Smith =

Fraser Smith or Fraser-Smith may refer to:

- Fraser T. Smith (born 1971), English record producer, songwriter and musician
- Charles Fraser-Smith (1904–1992), English author and missionary
