= Gunsword =

Gunsword may refer to:

- Gun Sword, a Japanese anime television series
- Gunblade, a fictional weapon in the Final Fantasy franchise
- Pistol sword, a sword with a pistol or revolver attached

== See also ==
- Gunblade (disambiguation)
