= Research and Development Branch =

OSS branch responsible for inventing spy gadgets

Agency overview
- Formed: October 19, 1942
- Dissolved: October 1, 1945
- Superseding agencies: SSU Office of Research and Development; CIA Office of Technical Services
- Headquarters: Clubhouse, basement floor, Congressional Country Club
- Agency executive: Stanley Platt Lovell
- Parent agency: Office of Strategic Services; National Defense Research Committee
- Child agency: NDRC Division 19

In the United States, the Research and Development Branch (abbreviated as R&D; informally referred to as the Department of Dirty Tricks) was a branch of the Office of Strategic Services (OSS), whose mission was to research and develop new technologies to aide Allied missions against the Axis powers during World War II. Operating in conjunction with the National Defense Research Committee to fulfill the special requests by OSS Headquarters, R&D was responsible for designing, testing, and procuring specialized equipment to support covert and clandestine operations, improve intelligence collection, and enable sabotage activities. R&D adapted and refined many clandestine issue items and supplied equipment primarily to the Secret Intelligence (SI) and Special Operations (SO) branches of OSS. The inventions of R&D were originated both by members of the US government, and by average US citizens who would submit their ideas – by the thousands – to the National Inventors Council. Most of these publicly originated ideas were nonsensical, and R&D would occasionally be forced to entertain them, especially if they were generated by high-ranking government officials, such as the infamous bat bomb and cat bomb experiments.

R&D produced suppressed and flashless pistols, deployable crossbows, assorted explosive devices, concealed cameras, and invisible inks and also worked with contractors to produce the low-cost single-shot 45-caliber “Liberator” pistol. R&D created forged documents, such as passports, currency, and postage stamps, and the methods to create forged documents in the field. It produced escape-and-evasion aids and covert tools, such as a cyanide “L” capsule intended to prevent forced disclosure, compact photographic gear disguised as commonplace objects, and folding lock-picking sets. R&D also experimented with brainwashing and devices to aid in psychological operations.

In order to effectively distribute items to US commanders, the OSS produced a mail order catalogue entitled OSS Weapons. The catalogue was distributed to all major US commands during the war for their respective commanders to select and field certain items. OSS Weapons also included inventions from the other US branches, to include the Air Force and the Navy. Throughout the war, OSS had a shared agreement with the British Special Operations Executive (SOE) that all gadgets, gear, and devices produced by either government should be cross-compatible between Allied forces, and therefore the OSS Weapons catalogue contained many SOE devices.

== History ==
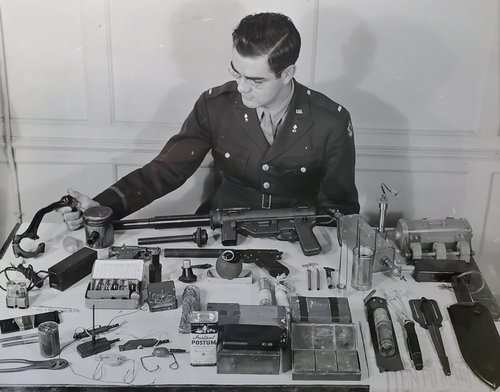
MIT graduate and chemical engineer Ernest Crocker, known as the man with the "million dollar nose," seen with a display of R&D weapons and devices. Crocker's most famous invention during the war was called Who, Me?

=== Technical services at the Office of the Coordinator of Information ===
R&D began as the Technical Services Section (TSS) within the Special Activities/Goodfellow (SA/G) Branch of the Office of the Coordinator of Information (COI). The Chief of SA/G, Millard Preston Goodfellow, was a journalist and publisher by trade, and did not have the training required to manage a weapons section.

Goodfellow often submitted requests to the NDRC for unconventional weapons without providing sufficient operational details, making it difficult for scientists at the National Defense Research Committee (NDRC) to design effective devices. The resulting confusion led researchers to appeal directly to William J. Donovan, urging clearer requirements before further developments could continue. This early phase of the Technical Services was disordered and limited progress was made in experimental weapons design. Around this time, Goodfellow began holding conversations Vannevar Bush, the founder of the NDRC and the Office of Scientific Research and Development (OSRD). Bush was effectively the leader of US scientific development during the war, and acted throughout the war as President Roosevelt's unofficial science advisor. Donovan and Bush would not personally meet until roughly a year into the creation of the OSS.

=== Creation of the Office of Strategic Services and establishment of R&D Branch ===
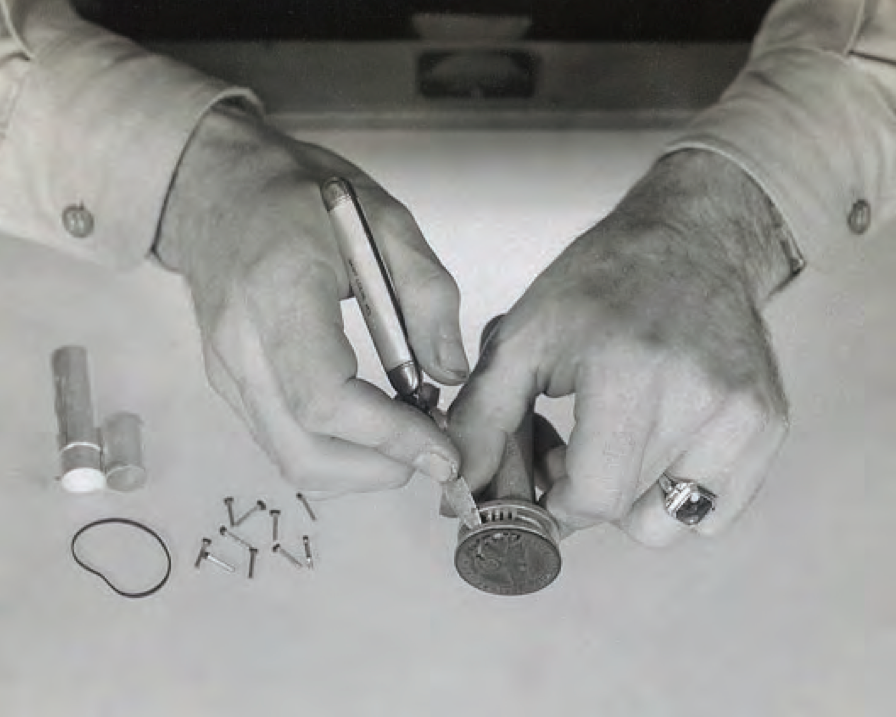
An R&D officer prepares a document forgery device for use.

On June 13, 1942, COI was reorganized and expanded as the Office of Strategic Services (OSS), and Goodfellow's unit was renamed the Special Operations Branch (SO). It was within the OSS which systematic research and development finally began.

Earlier in the year of 1942, after being recruited into NDRC while lecturing at Harvard, Stan Lovell arrived in Washington, assigned to the Quartermaster Corps. Vannevar Bush quickly brought Lovell under his tutelage, and began grooming him for the command of a major wartime office. In the Summer of 1942, around the time that the OSS was being established out of COI, Bush administered a thought experiment to all of his aides which posed a hypothetical problem requiring creativity and problem solving abilities. Lovell, an inventor and biochemical engineer from Massachusetts, scored the highest on the test. Lovell was ordered to report to a mysterious location, and when he arrived, Donovan opened the door and interviewed Lovell on the spot. It was in this interview that Lovell gained the nickname "Professor Moriarty," after the famous antagonist from the Sherlock Holmes series. Donovan told Lovell that he would have to invent "every subtle device and every underhanded trick to use against the Germans and the Japanese..."

Between October 17 and 19, 1942, R&D was elevated to Branch status within the OSS, with Lovell acting as Director. In the initial branch development process, the branch had few experienced personnel. To gain a more sophisticated approach, Lovell and three of his colleagues travelled to England to monitor and observe operations at the Special Operations Executive (SOE). They visited SOE laboratories and training camps, and formed a professional working relationship with SOE section chiefs, such as Charles Fraser-Smith and Malcolm Muggeridge.

=== End of World War II ===
Following the end of the war, on October 1, 1945, R&D was transferred to the Strategic Services Unit (SSU). Here, it became known as the SSU Office of Research and Development (OR&D).

R&D created plethora devices and gadgets, and only a small proportion were actually used on the battlefield during the war. However, many of the inventions created by OSS were later used by the Central Intelligence Agency in both clandestine and covert operations throughout the Cold War.

== Organizational structure ==
=== NDRC Special Weapons, Division 19, the Sandeman Club ===
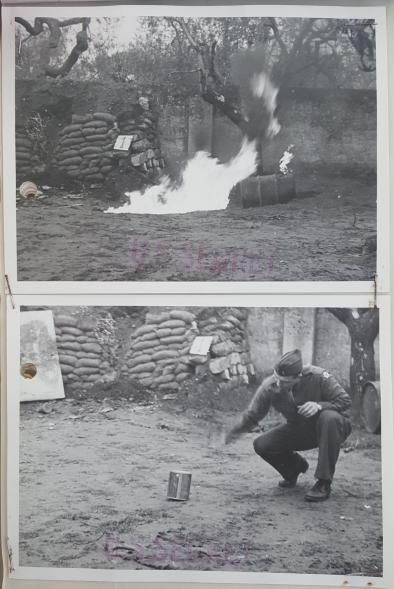
An R&D special weapons demonstration.

In late 1942, an agreement was arranged under which the NDRC provided laboratory facilities dedicated to OSS requirements. Division 19, or more commonly referred to as the Sandeman Club, focused exclusively on developing weapons and devices for OSS use.

While Division 19 fell under the command structure of the NDRC and the Office of Scientific Research and Development (OSRD), it was strictly under the direct command of Stan Lovell and R&D, and its devices were created to the direct specifications required by the OSS. Lovell, therefore, maintained his office and government rank at NDRC throughout the war. Vannevar Bush, upon granting the request for NDRC scientists to be absconded to the OSS, told Lovell: "If they want to make a fountain pen that does things no self-respecting fountain pen would ever do, we will make one." Indeed, R&D later created several forms of exploding fountain pens, and several forms of fountain pens with concealed recording devices.

To carry out the laboratory work, the Maryland Research Laboratory (MRL) was established as a principal facility, which was located in the basement floor of the four-storey clubhouse of the Congressional Country Club. When demands exceeded MRL's capacity, selected universities and independent laboratories were assigned additional projects.

Lovell appointed Harris Chadwell, a chemistry professor at Tufts University, to become the Chief of the Sandeman Club for most of the war. Chadwell's former roommate at Harvard, Louis Fieser (the man who had already invented Napalm), was recruited to run the Incendiary Devices Section of the Sandeman Club. Famously, only shortly after joining the Sandeman Club, Fieser nearly accidentally burned down a train station in Boston, after improperly packaging pocket incendiary devices bound for Europe.

One particular weapon produced at the Sandeman Club was a flashless, noiseless .22 caliber pistol. When Lovell gave the prototype pistol to Donovan, the OSS director brought it to the White House for a special demonstration. Donovan brought the pistol and a sandbag into the Oval Office while President Roosevelt was dictating a letter at the Resolute desk. President Roosevelt, focused on his work, did not notice Donovan place the sandbag on the floor and shoot ten rounds into the sandbag. The President only noticed the weapon when he smelled gunpowder in the room. Famously, after this moment, Roosevelt said that Donovan was "the only Republican" to ever be allowed into the Oval Office with a gun.

=== Technical Division ===
Division 19 of the NDRC conducted fundamental research and development, while the OSS Technical Division was responsible for ensuring that scientific work remained practicable for field use. The Technical Division assigned a project engineer to monitor NDRC progress and to coordinate final trials of new devices before a User Trial Committee. That committee included representatives from the NDRC, the Maryland Research Laboratory, the British Liaison Mission, and the OSS Procurement and Supply Branch. Devices intended for special operations were developed and evaluated in close consultation with Britain's Special Operations Executive (SOE), the result of a joint OSS-SOE agreement that equipment for clandestine missions should be largely interchangeable in the field.

=== Documentation Division ===
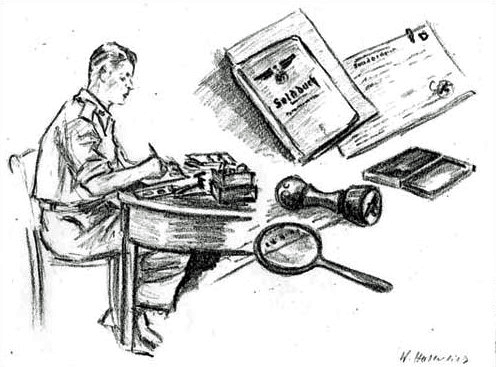
Eddie Lindner, of the Documents Division, is depicted forging Nazi documents.

In 1942, during an OSS staff meeting, Lovell learned that an American agent operating in France had been captured and executed after being unable to produce convincing identity papers. Lovell noted then a need for a reliable document-forgery capability within the organization. Lovell initially approached the problem through the study of paper and ink production. Donovan, a lawyer by training, was hesitant to authorize such work because of its potentially illegal nature. However, after reviewing Lovell's proposals, Donovan approved the establishment of a documentation program on December 8, 1942.

The Documentation Division was created to fabricate the range of identity and travel papers required to establish and sustain undercover identities in hostile and occupied areas; passports, identity cards, driver's licenses, ration books, work permits, and other official-looking records used to verify an operative's assumed status.

Lovell recruited Army officer Willis Reddick to head the new documentation unit and secured support from senior officials. With the assistance of Treasury Secretary Henry Morgenthau Jr., the project obtained White House authorization, cooperation from the U.S. Secret Service, and access to the Bureau of Engraving and Printing. The technical operations of the workshop were centered around Charlie Kelly, a veteran lithographer recruited from the American Banknote Company in New York City, despite that firm's objections. The original plan envisioned setting up document-production facilities in overseas theaters of operation, but this approach was soon revised. A central capability was instead established at OSS Headquarters, from which production methods and expertise could later be expanded to field locations.

=== Camouflage Division ===
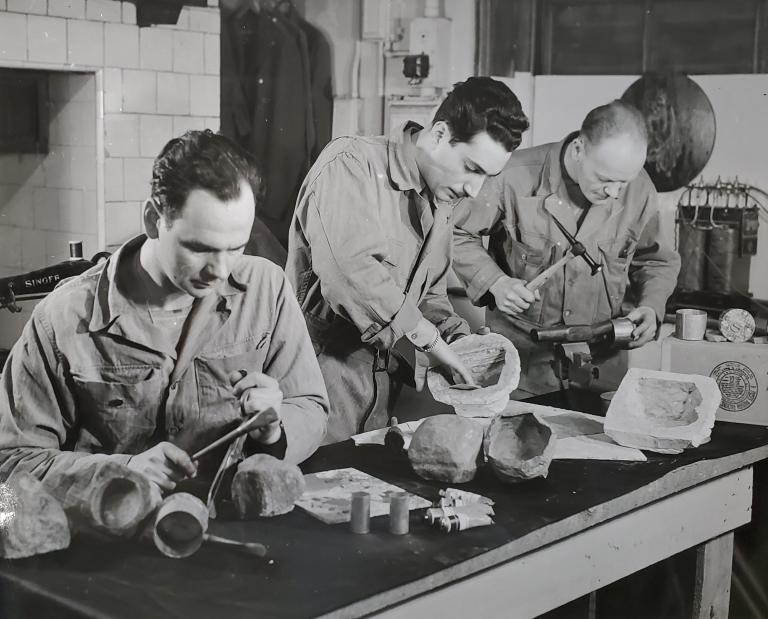
Officers from the Camouflage Division creating camouflaged message drops.

The Camouflage Division was responsible for disguising and concealing personal effects, devices, and operational equipment used in special operations. Its work focused on making tools and gear appear innocuous or blend into their surroundings, through concealment, deceptive housings or markings, false compartments, and surface treatments, so that items could be carried, deployed, or used without attracting attention.

=== Special Assistants Division ===
The Special Assistants Division was established to supply specialized equipment and materials for officers and agents that lay outside the technical or functional responsibilities of the other divisions. It handled unique or irregular requests requiring custom solutions or rapid adaptation for specific operational needs.

== Inventions and devices ==
R&D is most well known for developing offensive devices, being firearms, weapons, explosives and incendiary devices, but they also developed many other forms of devices and gadgets to facilitate the wide array of OSS and allied activities against the Axis powers. Inventories ranged from limpet-style naval mines to small, concealable charges and novel devices; among them an edible explosive compound developed for emergency use. The branch also created a variety of trigger mechanisms, including chemical and pressure-activated fuzes and clockwork timers that permitted agents to arm charges and depart before detonation.

A related group in the Communications Branch supplied technical support with wiretap equipment, electronic beacons, and compact, field-portable radio sets.

R&D also investigated underwater techniques and devices for use by military frogmen, until those responsibilities were transferred to the Maritime Unit in 1943.

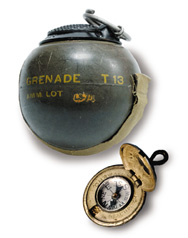
The T13 Beano Grenade (above) was inspired by the shape and throwing effectiveness of a baseball. Compasses hidden inside of buttons (below) were supplied to Army officers in secret, and even lower-ranking enlisted soldiers were unaware of these secret compasses.

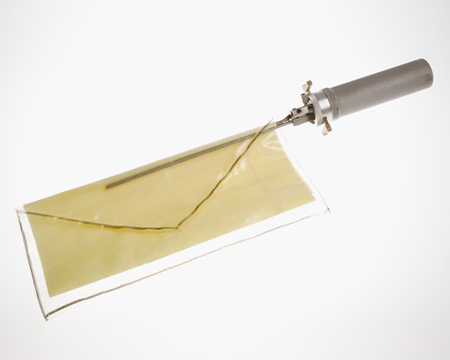
This letter removal device was a form of letter opener designed to open a letter without the enemy knowing that it had been opened.

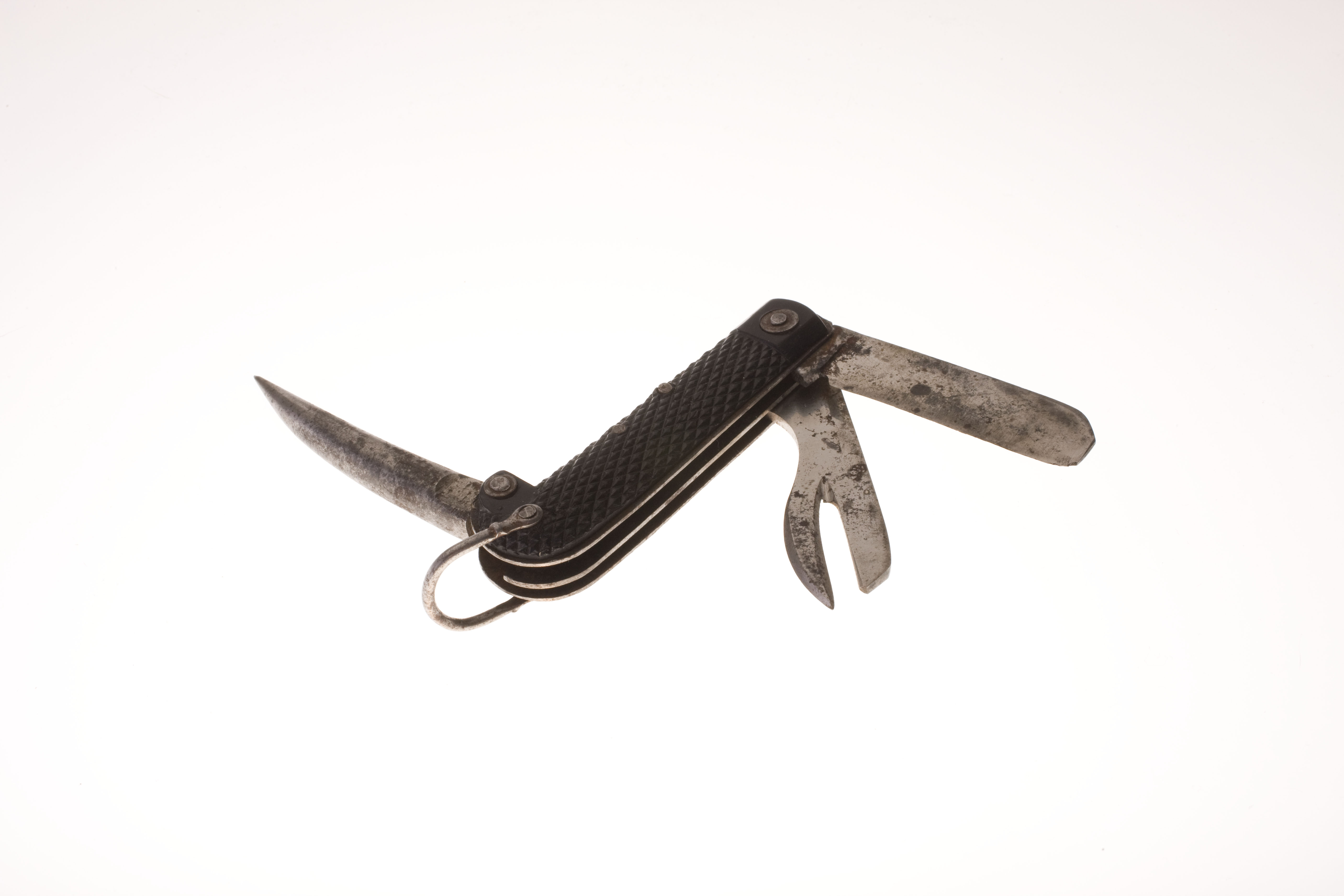
R&D developed many different types of specialized and mission-specific knives, including this demolitionist's evasion knife.

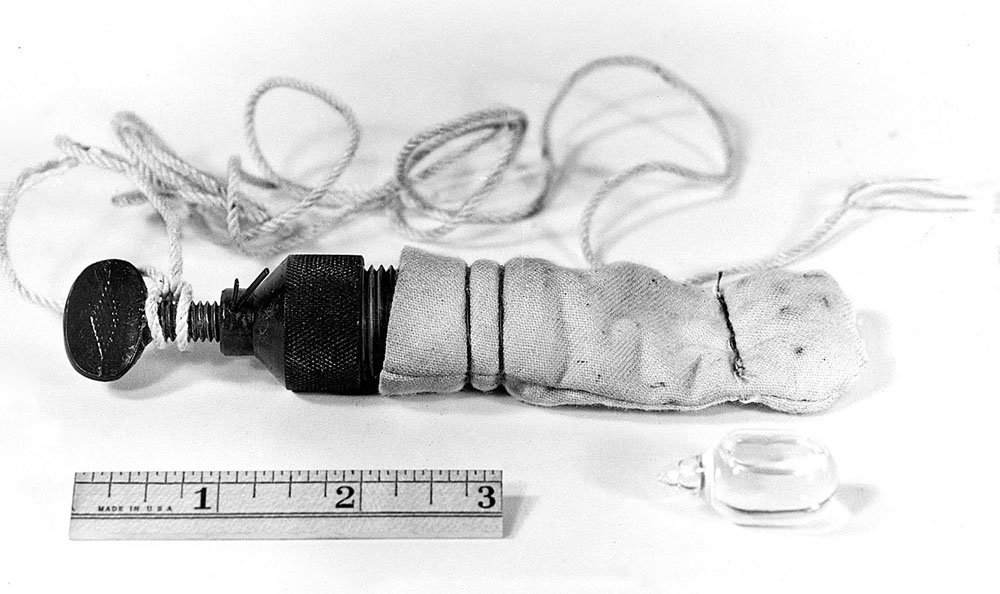
The Dog Drag was designed to confuse tracking dogs. When crushed, the glass vial emitted a noxious odor and caused the dogs to retreat.

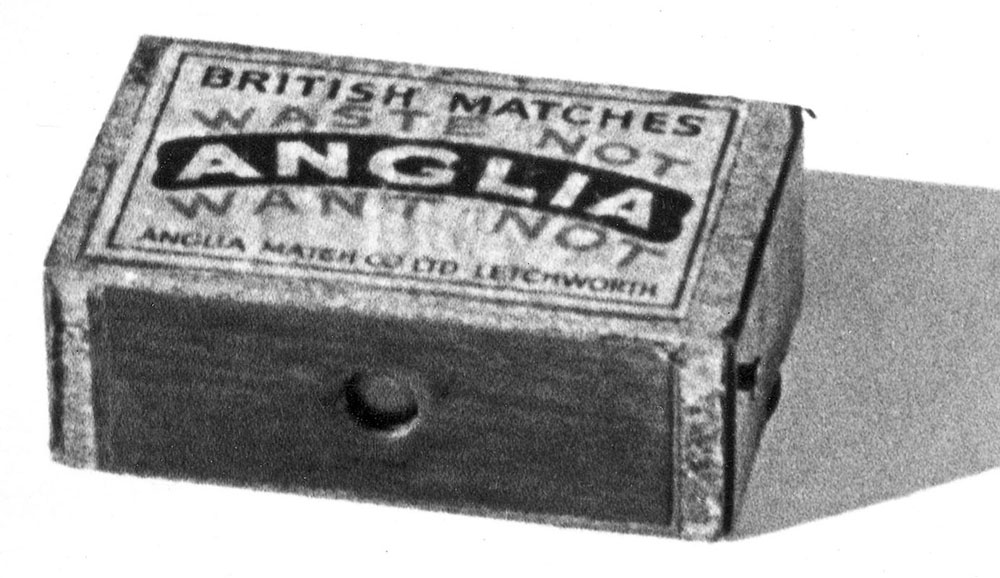
Designed to resemble a common box of matches, the OSS Matchbox Camera was developed alongside the Eastman Kodak Co. and supplied to operatives working behind enemy lines.

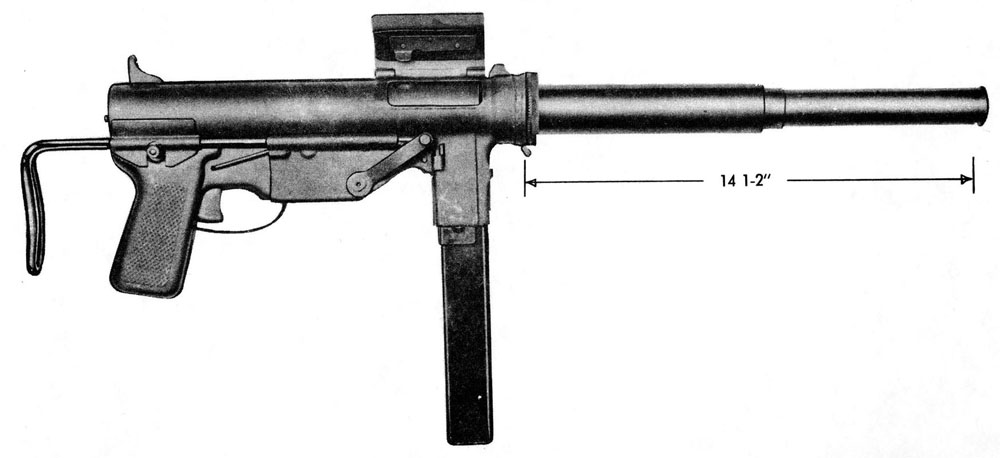
The M3 submachine “Grease” gun was fitted with a custom silenced barrel by R&D and used primarily in the Far East.

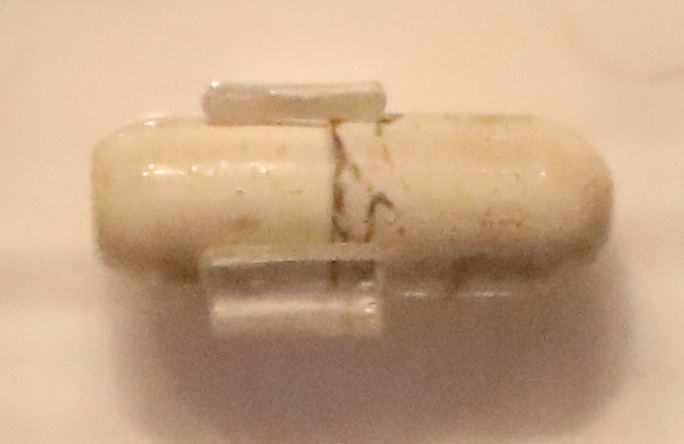
The "L Pill," or suicide pill, was developed in collaboration with the Special Operations Executive. Many other pills were developed by R&A, including the "A Pill," the "B Bill," and so on, which accomplished different tasks.

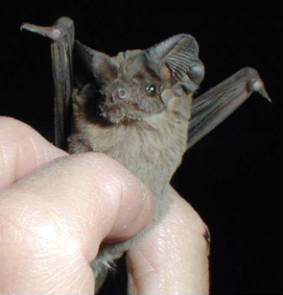
R&D was the first government office to work on the bat bomb experiments, in which bats were strapped with incendiary explosives and "trained" to nest in wooden Japanese targets.

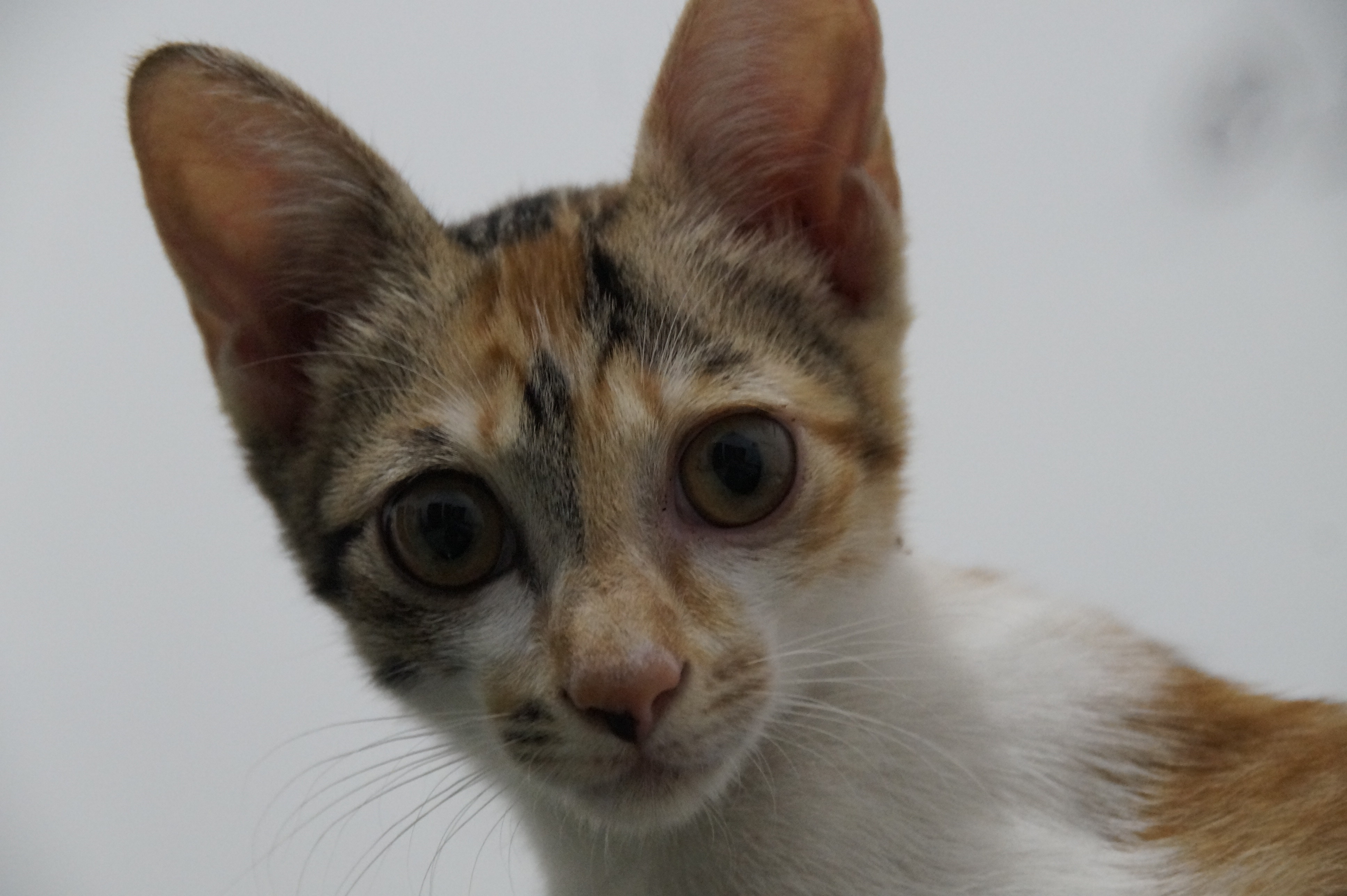
The cat bomb experiments were a series of experiments performed using the common domesticated housecat as a form of self-guided-missile, because a member of Congress believed that "cats always land on their feet," and would guide themselves onto the decks of ships at sea.

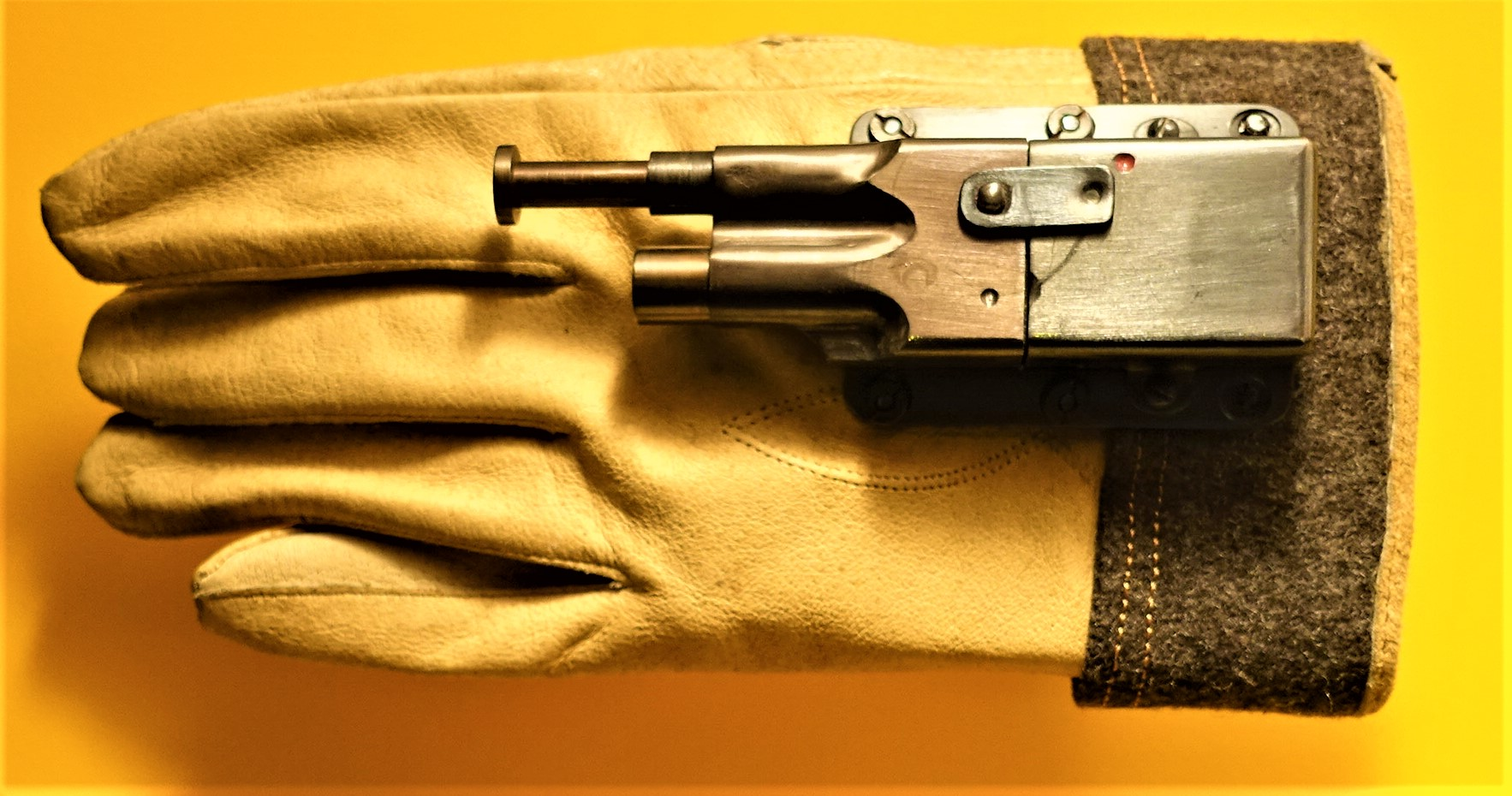
The Sedgley OSS .38 "Glove pistol." This was a pistol strapped to a glove developed primarily by the Office of Naval Intelligence and distributed in OSS Weapons.

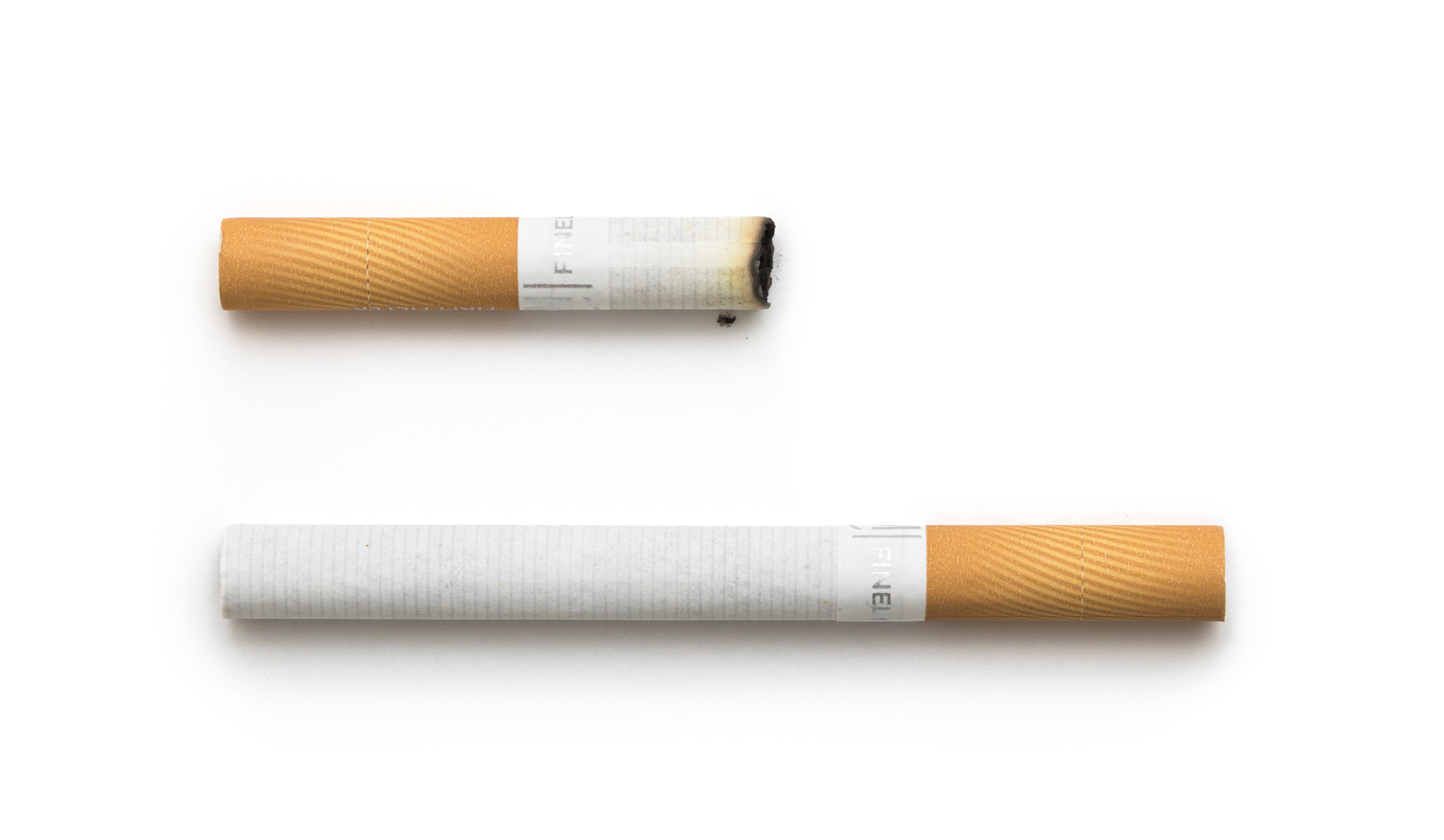
In the search for a functioning truth serum and effective mind control, cigarettes laced with tetrahydrocannabinol acetate and psychoactive chemicals were tested by George Hunter White on Americans without their knowledge. This was the foundation of the later MKUltra experiments carried out by the CIA.

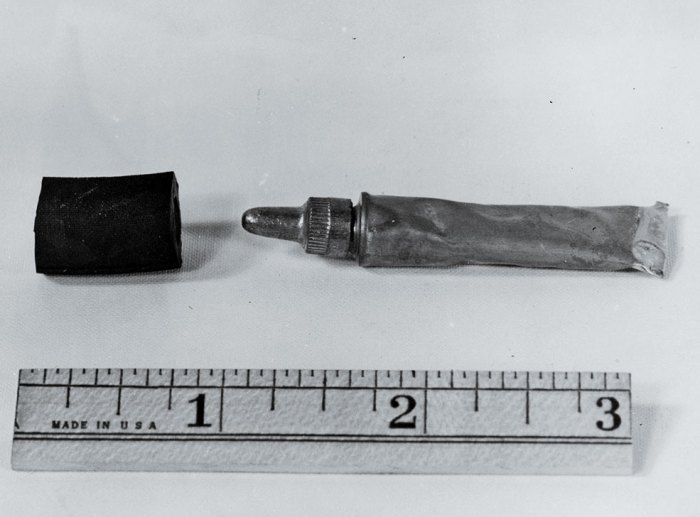
Who, Me? was a tube of rancid-smelling odorant created by R&A officer Ernest Crocker, designed to simulate the smell of a human fart. They were intended to be placed on the enemy to lower their morale.

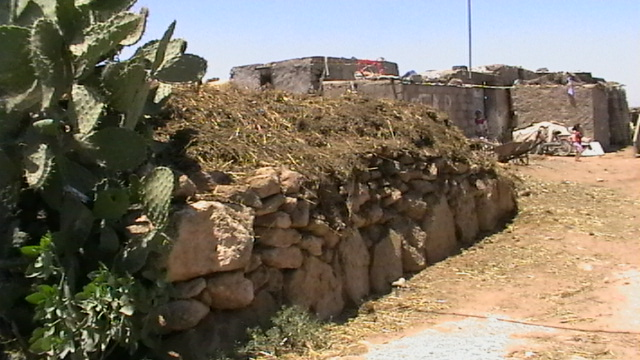
R&D experimented with the placement of piles of manure with infected disease-carrying flies along the coasts of North Africa prior to the Allied landings there.

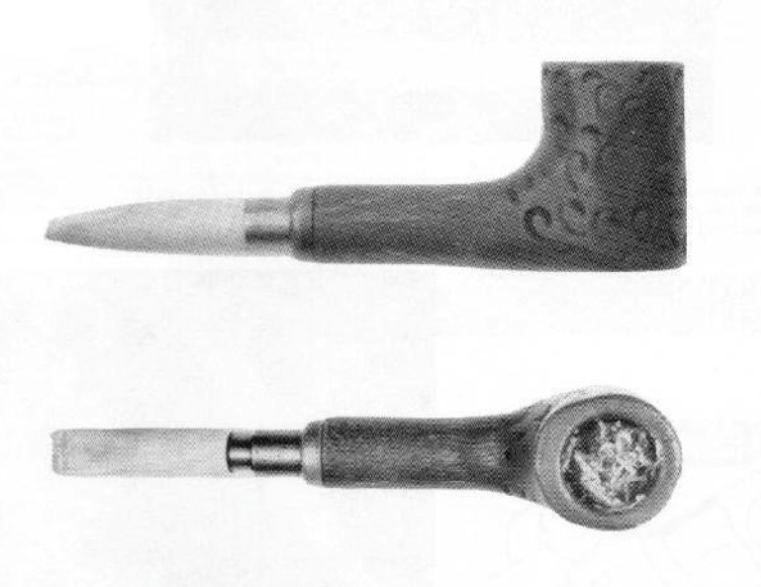
The Pipe pistol was an emergency weapon that looked like an ordinary pipe, but carried a .22 caliber firing mechanism.

== See also ==
- Q (James Bond)
- DARPA
- Intelligence Advanced Research Projects Activity
- Combat Capabilities Development Command Soldier Center
