= Apache revolver =

Apache Revolver
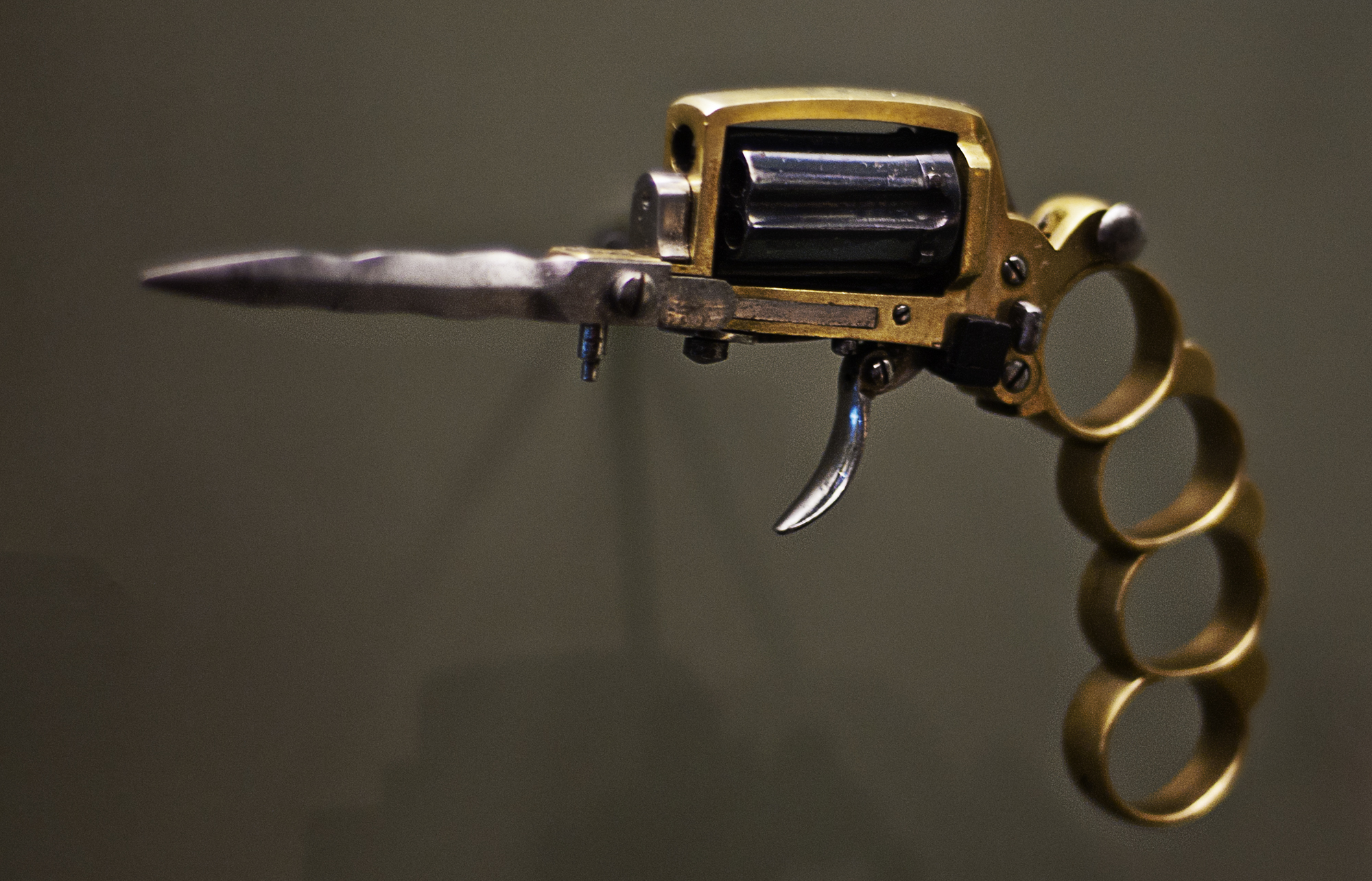
- Apache Revolver
- Type: Multi-purpose pinfire revolver
- Place of origin: Belgium

Production history
- Designer: Louis Dolne
- Designed: 1860
- Manufacturer: L. Dolne à Liege
- Produced: 1869
- Variants: 9×19mm Parabellum unofficial WWII British

Specifications
- Mass: 0.8lbs (385g)
- Length: Folded, 4.3" (105mm); Unfolded, 7.8" (200mm); Bayonet, 1.15" (29.21mm)
- Cartridge: 7 mm Lefaucheux
- Caliber: 7mm, .27cal.
- Action: Double action only
- Feed system: 6-round detaching cylinder
- Sights: None

An Apache revolver is a handgun which incorporates multiple other weapons, made notorious by the French underworld figures of the early 1900s known as Les Apaches.

== History ==
The design dates from the 1860s, and is attributed to Louis Dolne. The gun was manufactured until the end of the 1870s.

== Description ==
Drawing of an Apache revolver

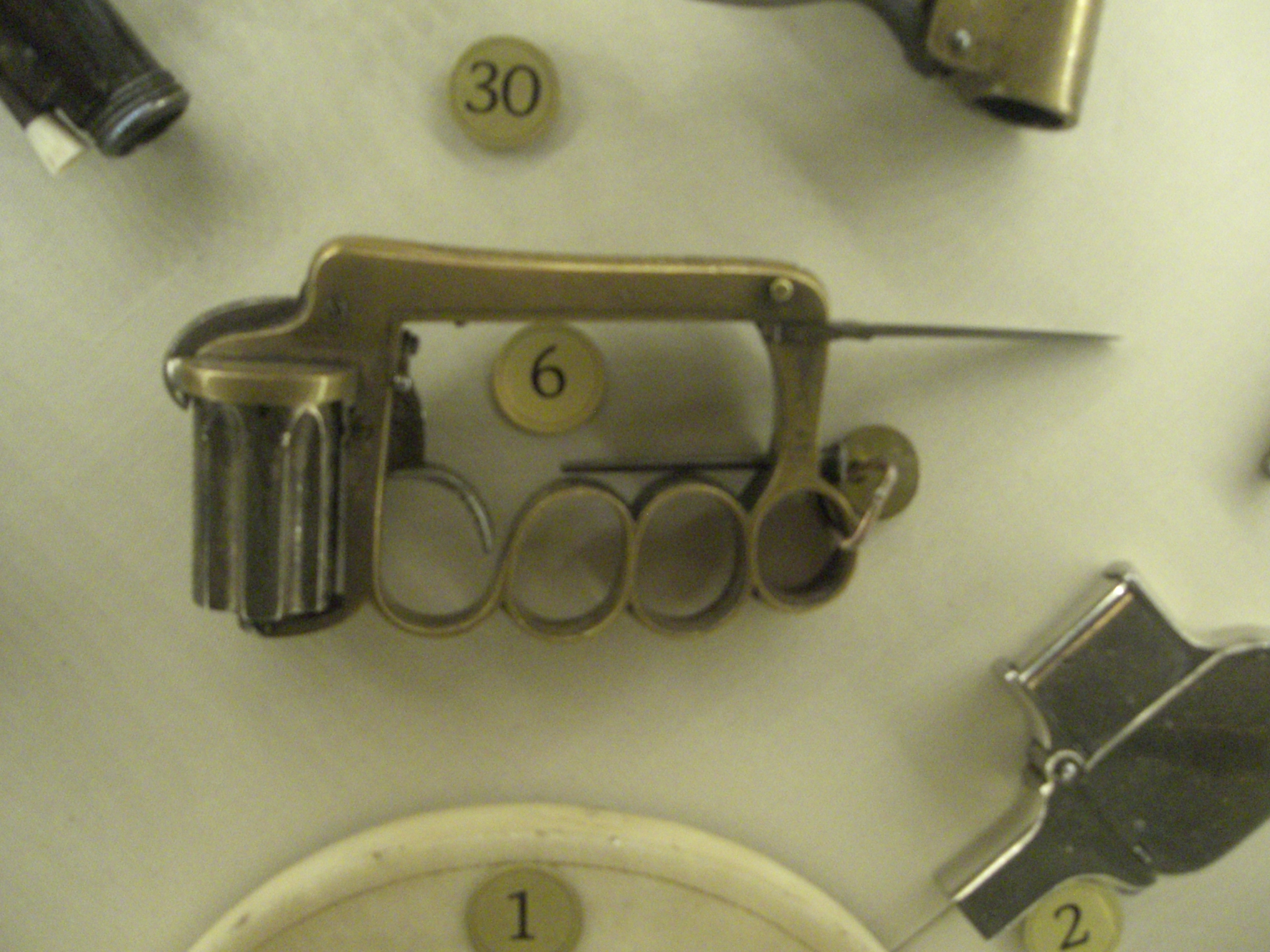
Deleaxhe Apache pistol 7mm

The Apache operates on the principle of a pepperbox revolver using a pinfire cartridge and incorporates a fold-over knuckle duster forming the grip and a rudimentary foldout dual-edged knife.

Due to the lack of a barrel, the revolver's effective range is very limited. Since its component parts can be folded inward towards the cylinder, it is easily concealable inside a pocket. It was common to leave an empty chamber with no cartridge under the hammer, as the weapon has no trigger guard or safety catch. The weapon cannot be aimed accurately because of its lack of front or rear sights and uses only the short space in the cylinder as a barrel. Despite its limited potential, the revolver was effective at extremely close range. For reloading, the cartridge cylinder must be removed, refilled, and replaced.

The revolver also has a design constraint when opening the barrel: by default the barrel points back toward the knuckles of the user. Thus, the user has to remove the knuckles, rotate the gun to point forward to the target, and then shoot. Certain defense scenarios might not accord the liberty of time to perform such an involved maneuver.

A 9×19mm Parabellum revolver of similar design (designation: Enfield project D.D.(E) 3313) was allegedly used by British Commandos during World War II, though exact statistics about production numbers and technical details have as yet remained undisclosed to the public.

== See also ==
- Sedgley OSS .38 Glove Pistol
- Pistol sword
