= Stanley Platt Lovell =

American intelligence officer and industrial biochemist

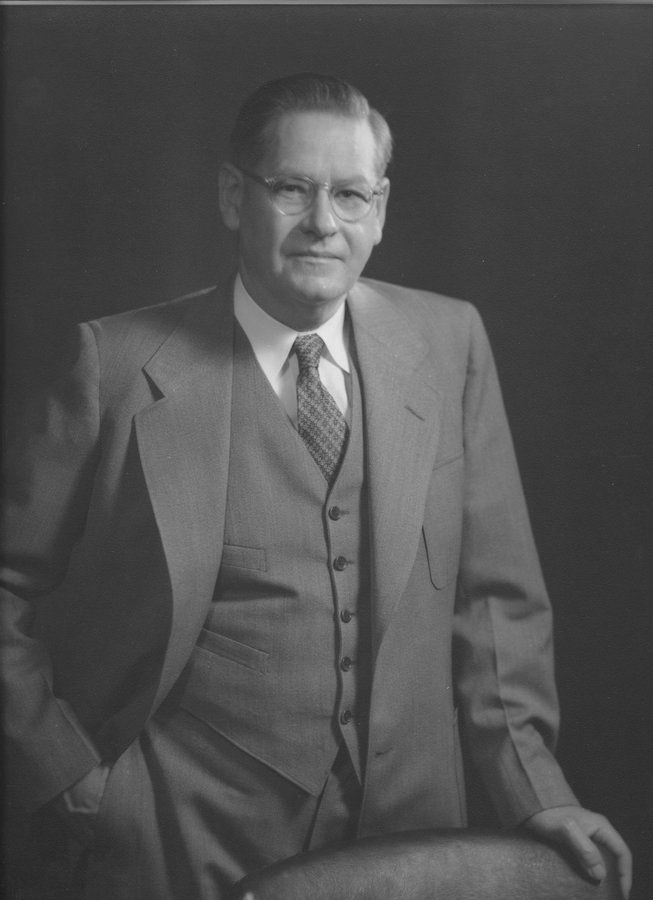

Chief of the Research and Development Branch
- In office October 17, 1942 – 1945
- Appointed by: William J. Donovan
- Counterparts: Christopher Hutton; Charles Fraser-Smith; Jasper Maskelyne
- Succeeded by: Sidney Gottlieb

Liaison Officer of the National Defense Research Committee to the Office of Strategic Services
- In office June 13, 1942 – 1945
- Supervisors: Vannevar Bush; William J. Donovan

Liaison Officer of the National Defense Research Committee to the Office of the Coordinator of Information SA/G
- In office 1942
- Supervisors: Millard Preston Goodfellow; Vannevar Bush; David K. E. Bruce

Personal details
- Born: August 29, 1890 Brockton, Massachusetts
- Died: January 4, 1976 (aged 85) Newtonville, Massachusetts
- Resting place: Hillside Cemetery, Osterville, Barnstable County, Massachusetts
- Education: Cornell University
- Awards: Presidential Medal for Merit

Stanley Platt Lovell, who went by the nickname Professor Moriarty, was an American industrial biochemist and intelligence officer who headed the Research and Development Branch (R&D) of the Office of Strategic Services (OSS) during World War II, commonly referred to as the "Department of Dirty Tricks."

Before the war began, Lovell already held over 70 patents. At the onset of World War 2, Lovell moved to Washington, D.C. to work underneath Vannevar Bush at the National Defense Research Committee (NRDC). In 1942, he acted as Bush's Liaison Officer to the Special Activities/Goodfellow (SA/G) unit within the Office of the Coordinator of Information, and SA/G Chief Millard Preston Goodfellow.

In the summer of 1942, he was tapped by William J. Donovan to head the newly established R&D Branch of the OSS. As head of R&D, he was in charge of many innovations developed by OSS, leading a team of scientists to create some of the most sensational inventions during the war. Lovell is thought to be an inspiration for the fictional character Q from the James Bond series, sharing this title with Charles Fraser-Smith from the British Special Operations Executive. Smith and Lovell collaborated on the development of several devices. In 1943, Lovell was appointed as the lead scientist in charge of the US government's search for the "T-Drug," the first truth serum experiments undertaken by the US Intelligence Community. He trained George Hunter White, who later collaborated extensively with Sidney Gottlieb in the 1950s and 1960s, dosing Americans with LSD without their knowledge and observing their behaviors.

Lovell and his team experimented with a way to liberate North Africa from the Nazis (occupying Axis powers) using mounds of manure and infected flies placed in rural villages. The Hollywood actress Hedy Lamarr worked with Lovell for a time, inventing a distraction device that came to be known as "The Hedy." Lovell demonstrated The Hedy for the Joint Chiefs of Staff without advanced warning, and they never invited him back. Lovell is credited with the discovery that the Nazis were using heavy water in the process to construct a nuclear bomb. He was one of the primary OSS chiefs responsible for the bat bomb experiments. In 1944, Lovell approved the use of Nerve gas to be deployed on Iwo Jima, but the President vetoed this operation. Lovell invented several devices for the potential assassination of Adolf Hitler, including a crushable tablet containing odorless mustard gas. Lovell and his team invented the time pencil and the limpet mine.

After World War 2, Lovell became President of the Lovell Chemical Company.

In November 2022, the Office of Strategic Services Society presented the inaugural Stanley Lovell Award at its annual William J. Donovan Award Dinner.

== Written works ==
- Of Spies and Stratagems (1964)
