= Bat bomb =

Experimental WWII U.S. incendiary weapon

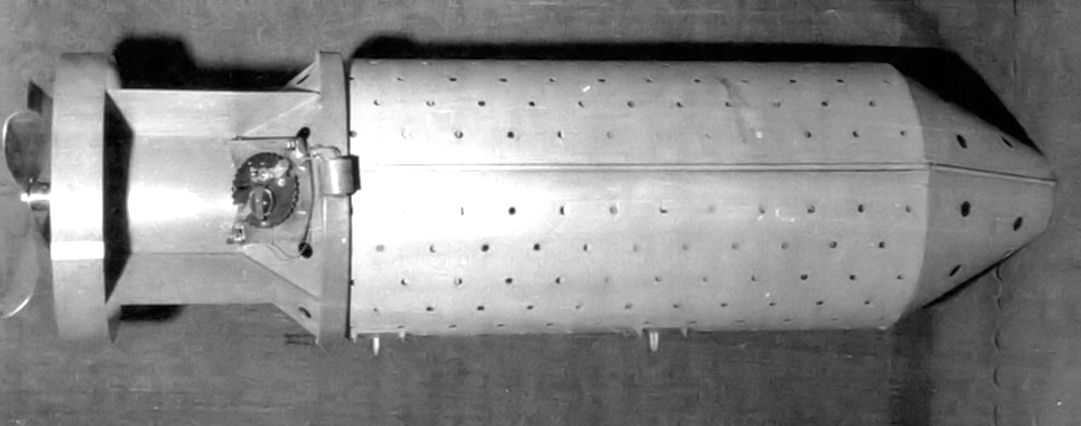
- Bat bomb canister later used to hold the hibernating bats.
- Type: Bomb
- Place of origin: US

Service history
- In service: Never used
- Used by: United States of America
- Wars: World War II

Production history
- Designer: Lytle Adams
- Designed: January 1942

Specifications
- Mass: 123 kg (271 lb)
- Length: 123 cm (48 in)

Bat bombs were an experimental World War II weapon developed by the United States. The bomb consisted of a bomb-shaped casing with over a thousand compartments, each containing a hibernating Mexican free-tailed bat with a small, timed incendiary bomb attached. Dropped from a bomber at dawn, the casings would deploy a parachute in mid-flight and open to release the bats, which would then disperse and roost in eaves and attics in a 20–40-mile radius (32–64 km). The incendiaries, which were set on timers, would then ignite and start fires in inaccessible places in the largely wood and paper constructions of the Japanese cities that were the weapon's intended target. The United States Navy took control in August 1943, using the code name Project X-Ray.

== Conception ==
The bat bomb was conceived by Lytle S. Adams (1881–1970), a dental surgeon from Irwin, Pennsylvania, who was an acquaintance of First Lady Eleanor Roosevelt. The inspiration for Adams' suggestion was a trip he took to Carlsbad Caverns National Park, which is home to many bats. Adams wrote about his idea of incendiary bats in a letter to the White House in January 1942 – little more than a month after the attack on Pearl Harbor. Adams was intrigued by the strength of bats and knew that they roosted before dawn. He also knew that most of the buildings in Tokyo were constructed of wood instead of concrete. He believed that if time-release incendiaries could be attached to bats, some kind of container holding them could be dropped over the city after dark and the bats would simply roost and burn Tokyo to the ground.

In his letter, Adams stated that the bat was the "lowest form of animal life", and that, until now, "reasons for its creation have remained unexplained". He went on to espouse that bats were created "by God to await this hour to play their part in the scheme of free human existence, and to frustrate any attempt of those who dare desecrate our way of life."

President Roosevelt passed the letter to William J. Donovan, the director of the Office of Strategic Services (OSS), in which he attached a cover letter, which read: "This man is not a nut. It sounds like a perfectly wild idea but is worth your time looking into." Donovan was enthused by the idea, and instructed Stanley Platt Lovell to use the Research and Development Branch (R&D) to pursue the initial designs and development. Lovell, a close aide of Vannevar Bush, assigned the project to Division 19 of the National Defense Research Committee (NDRC), also known as the "Sandeman Club," of which OSS R&D had command authority. Harris Chadwell, Lovell's subordinate and the chief of Division 19, recruited the Harvard zoology professor Donald Griffin onto the project (Chadwell and Lovell were both affiliated with Harvard).

The plan was subsequently approved by President Roosevelt on Griffin's advice.

== After government approval ==
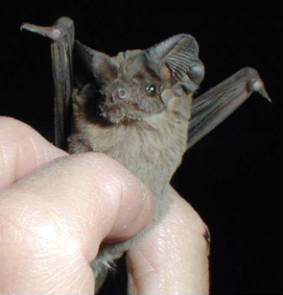
Tadarida brasiliensis, Mexican free-tailed bat

After Roosevelt gave the project his approval, it was relegated to the authority of the United States Army Air Force. Adams assembled the workers for the project, including the mammalogist Jack von Bloeker, actor Tim Holt, a former gangster, and a former hotel manager, among others. Von Bloeker, his assistant, Jack Couffer, and Ozro Wiswell, a scientist, self-described "bat lovers", noted that it did not occur to them to question the "morality or the ecological consequences of sacrificing a few million bats". For the duration of the project, many members enlisted in the Air Force, where Adams quickly promoted them to "acting" non-commissioned officers.

The team had to determine several variables to make the project feasible, including what kind of incendiaries could be attached to the bats, as well as the temperatures at which to store and transport them. The bats had to be kept in hibernation while they were shipped. To accomplish this, they were stuck in ice cube trays and cooled. They also had to decide what species of bat to use for the bombs. After testing several species, the Mexican free-tailed bat was selected. Adams had to ask for permission from the National Park Service for Griffin to harvest large numbers of Mexican free-tailed bats from caves on government property. While the original plan was to arm the bats with white phosphorus, American chemist Louis Fieser, Griffin's former roommate at Harvard, joined the team and white phosphorus was replaced with his invention, napalm.

Tests were used to determine how much napalm an individual bat could carry, determining that a 14 g (0.5 oz) bat could carry a payload of 15–18 g (0.53–0.63 oz). The napalm was stored in small cellulose containers dubbed "H-2 units". After trying several attachment methods, they decided to attach the H-2 unit to the bats using an adhesive, gluing them to the front of the bats.

The bomb carrier was a sheet metal tube approximately 1.5 m (5 ft) in length. The inside of the tube was fitted with twenty-six circular trays, each of which was 76 cm (30 in) in diameter. In total, each bomb carrier could hold 1,040 bats. It was planned that the carrier would be deployed from an airplane, descending to an altitude of 1,200 m (4,000 ft) before deploying parachutes. The sides of the bomb carrier would then fall away, allowing the bats to disperse.

== Setbacks and transfer to US Navy ==
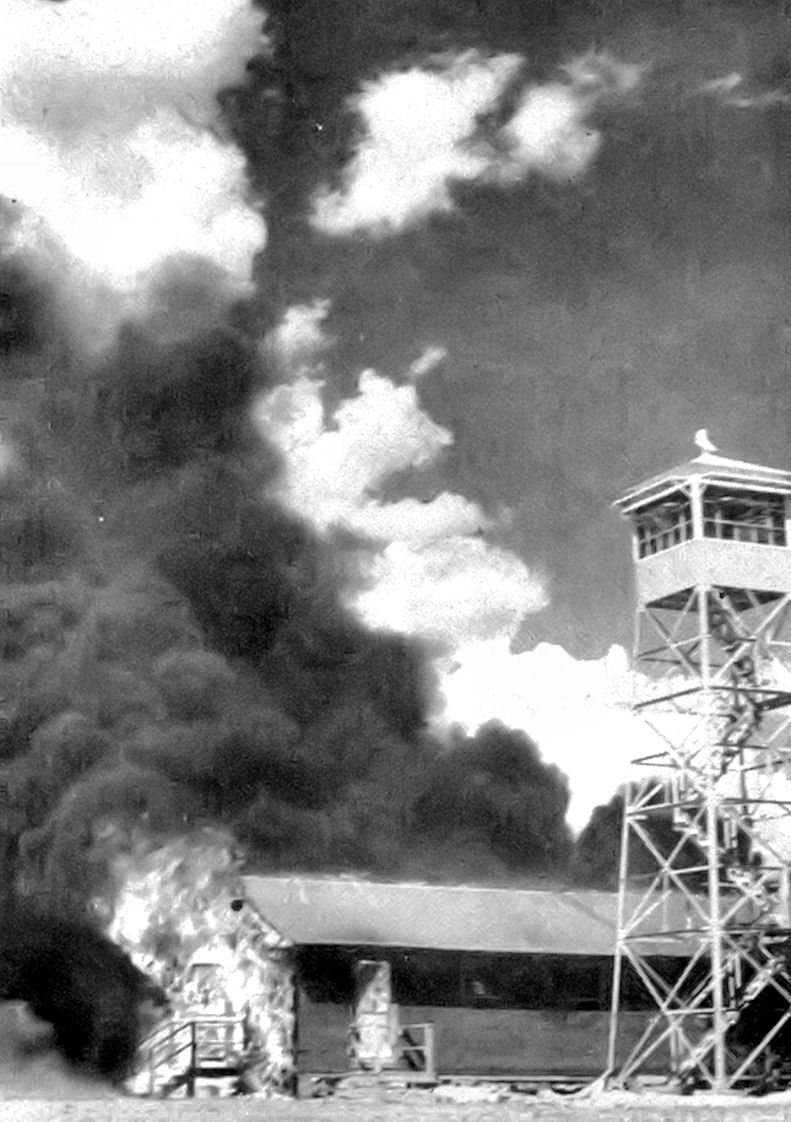
Errant bats from the experimental bat bomb set fire to the Carlsbad Army Airfield Auxiliary Air Base in New Mexico.

A series of tests to answer various operational questions were conducted. In one incident, the Carlsbad Army Airfield Auxiliary Air Base (32°15′39″N 104°13′45″W) near Carlsbad, New Mexico, was set on fire on 15 May 1943, when armed bats were accidentally released. The bats roosted under a fuel tank and incinerated the test range.

Following this setback, the project was relegated to the Navy in August 1943, who renamed it Project X-Ray, and then passed it to the Marine Corps that December. The Marine Corps moved operations to the Marine Corps Air Station at El Centro, California. After several experiments and operational adjustments, the definitive test was carried out on the "Japanese Village", a mockup of a Japanese city built by the Chemical Warfare Service at their Dugway Proving Ground test site in Utah.

Observers at this test offered optimistic accounts. The chief of incendiary testing at Dugway wrote:

A reasonable number of destructive fires can be started in spite of the extremely small size of the units. The main advantage of the units would seem to be their placement within the enemy structures without the knowledge of the householder or fire watchers, thus allowing the fire to establish itself before being discovered.

The National Defense Research Committee observer stated: "It was concluded that X-Ray is an effective weapon." The chief chemist's report stated that, on a weight basis, X-Ray was more effective than the standard incendiary bombs in use at the time: "Expressed in another way, the regular bombs would give probably 167 to 400 fires per bomb load where X-Ray would give 3,625 to 4,748 fires."

More tests were scheduled for mid-1944, but the program was canceled by Fleet Admiral Ernest J. King when he heard that it would likely not be combat ready until mid-1945. By that time, it was estimated that $2 million (equivalent to $35.8 million in 2025) had been spent on the project. It is thought that development of the bat bomb was moving too slowly, and was overtaken in the race for a quick end to the war by the atomic bomb project. Adams maintained that the bat bombs would have been effective without the devastating effects of the atomic bomb: "Think of thousands of fires breaking out simultaneously over a circle of forty miles [64 km] in diameter for every bomb dropped. Japan could have been devastated, yet with small loss of lives."

The infamous "Invasion by Bats" project was afterwards referred to by Stanley P. Lovell, director of research and development for Office of Strategic Services, whom General William J. Donovan ordered to review the idea, as "Die Fledermaus Farce".

Lovell had also mentioned bats, during testing, were dropping to the ground like stones.

== See also ==
- Animal-borne bomb attacks
- Anti-tank dog
- Explosive rat
- Harald Hardrada (using birds in a similar way to set fire to a besieged castle in Sicily)
- Japanese Balloon Bombs
- Military animals
- Olga of Kiev (using "pigeons or sparrows" as offensive weapons in the 900s AD)
- Project Pigeon

=== Bibliography ===
- Couffer, Jack (1992). Bat Bomb World War II's Secret Weapon. Austin Texas: University of Texas Press. ISBN 0-292-70790-8.
