= Christopher Hutton =

British soldier, airman, journalist and inventor

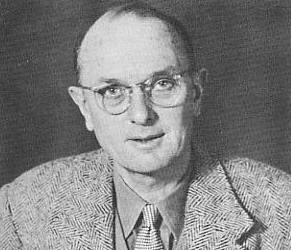
- Hutton in 1940

Q-Gadgets Technical Officer, MI9
- In office 1940–1943
- Appointed by: Norman Crockatt
- Counterparts: Charles Fraser-Smith; Stanley Platt Lovell; Jasper Maskelyne

Personal details
- Born: 16 November 1893 Birmingham, England
- Died: 3 September 1965 (aged 71) Exeter, England
- Resting place: Devon
- Nickname: Clutty

Military service
- Branch/service: South Lancashire Regiment; Northumberland Fusiliers; Yorkshire Regiment; Royal Air Force; MI9
- Rank: Major
- Battles/wars: World War I; World War II

Christopher William Clayton Hutton (16 November 1893 – 3 September 1965) was a British soldier, airman, journalist and inventor. Hutton is best known for his Second World War service with MI9, a secret branch of the British Directorate of Military Intelligence.

From the end of 1939 until 1943, Hutton worked in MI9 under Norman Crockatt. MI9 was created to design and distribute escape and evasion aids for Allied servicemen, and to help servicemen return to Allied territory after escaping. Hutton's team identified suitable manufacturers for escape and evasion equipment and devised methods by which such aids could be sent to prisoner of war camps. Many prisoners' escapes were assisted by MI9's silk maps and other escape and evasion equipment.

Hutton's wartime escape and evasion work required him to account for shortages of materials such as silk and steel wire. He was often in trouble with the police and with official supply authorities but was supported in these matters by Crockatt. Facing financial difficulties after WWII, Hutton wrote a book, Official Secret, about his wartime experiences. He faced government opposition to his attempts at publication due to the concern of his work revealing sensitive information but was eventually able to publish in 1960.

== Personal life ==
Clayton Hutton was born in Birmingham on 16 November 1893. His parents were Christopher Hutton, brass manufacturer, and Edith Eliza Hutton, née Clayton. From January 1904 to December 1908, Hutton attended King Edward's School, Birmingham. Upon leaving school, Hutton worked for his uncle, William Clayton, at Clayton's timber business and sawmills in Saltley. In April 1913, Hutton was involved in the stunt of Harry Houdini's faked escape from a wooden packing case. This event strengthened his fascination with both stage performances and escapology; Hutton writes that his mother discouraged him from pursuing a career in performance.

Hutton served in the First World War. Near the start of WWI he tried to enter the Royal Flying Corps but was rejected. On 26 December 1914 he was commissioned into the South Lancashire Regiment, later transferring into the Northumberland Fusiliers, and then into the Yorkshire Regiment. In this regiment he became a captain and was briefly an adjutant. He gained a British flying certificate on 9 May 1917. On the formation of the Royal Air Force in April 1918, Hutton was appointed an RAF Staff Captain and served in Salonica (then a city in the Kingdom of Greece. After two months' administrative work, he passed military pilot training and served briefly as a pilot before being demobilised in January 1919. After the war, Hutton held a variety of short-term jobs including that of a newspaper reporter. He later worked in publicity in the film industry, during which time he lived briefly in Berlin.

During WWII, Hutton interviewed at the War Office to contribute to the war effort and was recommissioned in May 1940 as a captain on the general list of the British Army. Following the interview with the War Office, he and four others were appointed to help Norman Crockatt set up a new section in the secret service department MI9. Their tasks included training fighting men in how to evade capture or escape if they found themselves in enemy-held territory. To these duties were eventually added the responsibilities of supporting escape and evasion lines and questioning returned prisoners after their successful escape. Hutton's role was to provide evasion and escape devices.

When Hutton began his MI9 duties, escape and evasion activities under Crockatt were based in Room 424 of the Metropole Hotel, Northumberland Avenue, London. Hutton kept away from the building as much as possible; according to his account, this was on Crockatt's orders. Instead, he worked out of a small room in the War Office buildings. As the result of a dispersion policy in October 1940 the whole outfit was removed to Wilton Park Estate, Beaconsfield, Buckinghamshire. Hutton writes that he was assigned a large office and a driver. Later in WWII, Hutton took his equipment and materials to a remote building on the estate to continue working undisturbed. He was described as a forceful character who worked ceaselessly to overcome both technical and bureaucratic obstacles when inspired by an idea. Hutton was promoted to the rank of major in 1943 and later the same year he retired from the British Armed Forces. After his retirement, he was still bound under the Official Secrets Act.

== Escape and evasion equipment ==
Brigadier Norman Crockatt headed MI9 during its existence and created its philosophy of "escape-mindedness" which became the focus of the training programme: it was emphasized that attempting to escape was the duty of every captured soldier.

Crockatt allowed Hutton to decide how to organise his work and choose its priorities; Alfred John Evans, another member of MI9, had emphasized to Hutton that the three essentials for an escaper are maps, compasses, and food. Hutton therefore decided to concentrate on providing these needs to all combat personnel. He realised that a study of books about WWI experiences could provide insights. Short of time, he arranged for sixth form students at Rugby School, Crockatt's alma mater, to write summaries. Further help came from a colonel in the War Office who gave Hutton the script of a 1937 lecture by General Walther von Brauchitsch describing German experiences of running prison camps in WWI. From these materials Hutton was able to appraise the main necessities for a soldier to escape German prison camps.

In 1942, Clayton Hutton's Section in MI9 produced a top secret booklet named Per Ardua Libertas. This contained illustrations of escape and evasion maps and other aids. Copies were passed to a visiting delegation of American Intelligence Officers.

=== Fabric maps ===
Hutton is credited with the reinvention of the use of silk for an escape and evasion map. He considered maps to be "the escaper's most important accessory" and thought they should be issued to all flight crew. Cloth maps as an escape aid were not a completely new idea: for instance, Allied prisoners of war used cloth maps sewn into their clothes to escape from the German Holzminden camp in July 1918. Hutton's idea was that every serviceman should be issued with a compact map as one of three essential escape aids against the eventuality of being captured or shot down behind enemy lines. Hence he could attempt to evade capture or escape from detention. Hutton was surprised to discover that an acquaintance of his, Wallace Ellison, was not only a silk manufacturer in Macclesfield but had authored a book on prisoners and prison escapes from Germany during WWI. Ellison offered assistance to Hutton in the production of silk maps.

At first, Hutton had difficulties obtaining cartographic data from War Office and Air Ministry sources in London. The Edinburgh mapmakers John Bartholomew and Son Ltd. agreed to supply maps of Germany, France, Poland, Italy, Austria, Switzerland, Belgium, the Netherlands, and the Balkans; the mapmakers waived copyrights in support of the war effort.

Once Hutton had the cartographic data, he needed a medium onto which he could print the maps. This medium needed to be quiet to unfold, not prone to disintegration when wet, maintaining its integrity when folded at the crease line, and concealable as very small packages. His first attempts to print on silk squares were unsuccessful since the minute details were blurred. This was solved by adding pectin to the ink. MI9 commissioned escape and evasion maps on silk, various synthetic cloth fibres, and special tissue paper. To increase their usefulness, most of these maps were printed double-sided.

A naval intelligence officer found a source of mulberry leaf paper, used in Japan, which had the texture of onion skins and excellent durability. Mulberry leaf paper could be folded tightly without permanent creases and did not fade or disintegrate when soaked in water. Maps printed on mulberry leaf paper could be folded tightly and concealed inside a chess piece or a phonograph record. Hutton arranged for a greeting card printer to laminate mulberry paper maps inside playing cards. When soaked in water, these cards delaminated to reveal serviceable maps of a chosen area. The map areas to be provided to particular POW camps were identified by secret contacts with knowledge of the camps and regions.

A former cartographer for the Ministry of Defence, Barbara Bond, researched escape and evasion maps that were used during WWII and credits Hutton as the primary person behind the development of such maps. She estimated that at least 243 different mapping items were produced and printed by MI9, resulting in the distribution of almost two million maps to Allied combatants. The recipients were generally flight crew but some were special forces such as commandos and SOE personnel.

=== Compasses ===
Hutton's work on compasses began around the time of the Dunkirk evacuation. Hutton contacted several major instrument makers to request concealable compasses, without success. Hutton then discovered a small London firm, Blunt Brothers, who had a well-equipped laboratory and workshops. They assured him that they had the capability to make 5,000 small compasses in a week but lacked a necessary steel product. Hutton used his MI9 credentials to purchase the steel.

During the first week, Blunt Brothers made simple bar compasses that were about one inch (25 mm) long with luminous tips. These compasses would hang from any convenient piece of thread. Next, a smaller prototype was made with a housing cut from 1/4 inch (6 mm) diameter brass tubing. With an outer screw thread, these compasses fit into the reverse of military uniform buttons and cap badges. When prison camp guards eventually discovered these miniature compasses, more were produced with a left-handed screw thread instead of the original right-handed thread. This fooled the guards for some time longer. Hutton and two of Blunts Brothers' instrument makers, George Waterlow and Dick Richards, developed the idea of magnetised safety razor blades. These pointed north when suspended from thread or when floating on water. To distinguish north from south, the first letter of the blade manufacturer's name indicated the north end of the blade.

When there was a shortage of steel points for the compass needles, Blunts Brothers began cutting these from readily available gramophone needles. In December 1940 the factory was bombed and the owners feared that production would stop due to potential bureaucratic delays in rebuilding the factory. Hutton successfully appealed to Lord Beaverbrook to have repairs made immediately. The firm's manufacture of bombsights may have contributed to Hutton's successful appeal.

Hutton's autobiography Official Secret includes diagrams of the following hidden compass devices:

- Gillette safety razor with a hidden compass and map space in the handle;
- Packs of magnetised safety razor blades originally manufactured by Gillette;
- Compasses concealed in collar studs;
- A magnetised pencil clip: a dimple on the balance point acted as a pencil-tip gimbal;
- Wooden pencil stub containing magnetised rod hidden beneath the lead;
- Mk.IV RAF ration pack included a good-quality compass and a miniature clock hidden in the screw-threaded stopper;
- Mechanical pencil in which three forms of compass and a map could be concealed.

=== Escape boxes ===
After the fall of France and the Low Countries, the priority for MI9 became support for RAF flights over the German-occupied territories. Crockatt approved of Hutton's work providing escape aids concealed in ration packs for flight crews but warned him that they would be "poaching" on the preserves of the Quartermaster-General.

Hutton's first escape packs used cigarette tins as the container for escape supplies. The first versions incorporated concentrated food, two paper maps, a tiny saw, a compass, and amphetamine tablets. For several days, he packed and unpacked the cigarette tins until he found the most efficient way of packing the necessary contents. Alfred John Evans pointed out that a safe water supply was also necessary and Hutton eventually incorporated water purifying tablets into the tins. The cigarette tin packs were issued for service as "RAF Ration Box Mk.II".

After an RAF pilot who bailed out over the English Channel reported the contents of the ration pack had been spoiled by water ingress, the container was redesigned. A round, waterproof container of clear plastic was developed by Halex after Hutton asked the chairman of the company for assistance. This design, issued as the "RAF Ration Pack Mk.IV", was more effective than the cigarette tins. Soldiers could store the contents of the pack in their uniform pockets and fill the container itself with water when required. The RAF Ration Pack Mk.IV contained a map, Horlicks tablets, a tube of cream, water purifying tablets, chocolate, adhesive tape, amphetamine tablets, matches, a needle and thread, and a compass and watch in the stopper.

=== Uniforms and clothing ===
Examples from the escape books of WWI led Hutton to consider convertible uniforms. RAF uniforms might be altered to resemble those of the Luftwaffe and those of other services could be imitated similarly. Military personnel were entitled to receive new uniforms in the POW camps, so Hutton devised a form of reversible uniform to send to prisoners. The jacket had a tailored lining of a darker material than that of the exterior; when unbuttoned, this lining served as a stand-alone civilian jacket.

Blankets were seemingly innocuous items that prison guards expected prisoners to receive from their families. Since prison camps often contained tailors, who could alter clothing or sew it new from raw fabric, Hutton included hidden sewing pattern markings on blankets. He consulted experts from the Wool Association to select the ideal dual-purpose cloth for this purpose. Sewing patterns were applied in invisible ink that would show when the blanket was soaked in cold water. Concealed dyes, also devised in Hutton's department, provided further support to the disguises.

=== Flying boots ===
The 1943 "Escape" pattern flying boots were designed by Hutton. These boots consisted of a black leather laced walking shoe and a black zip-up suede legging. The right boot had a concealed pocket in which a small folded knife was stored. In the event of landing in enemy territory, the wearer would cut the leggings off the shoe, making the boots less conspicuous and more comfortable to walk in than a conventional flying boot. The leggings could be reassembled into a waistcoat for extra warmth. The design remained in service with the RAF until the mid-1950s. Hutton also designed flying boots with hollow heels to hide maps and other escape equipment.

=== Saws ===
Prisoners often needed to cut through iron window bars to escape. Hutton mentions "a tiny saw" among the contents of the RAF Ration Box Mk.II, but this must indeed have been very small to fit into the cigarette tin alongside other objects. Foot & Langley say that MI9 produced "several formidable hacksaws". Learning of Gigli saws after talking to a friend whose father was a surgeon, Hutton hid these wire saws in bootlaces. He obtained enough serrated wire for 10,000 saws from a factory in Birmingham.

== Other inventions during MI9 service ==
Some of Hutton's inventions and developments of existing ideas were either taken up in only relatively small quantities or dropped altogether, often at the behest of other branches of the secret services. As described in his autobiography, these inventions included the following:

- Miniature wireless sets: interrogation reports from returning escapees indicated to Hutton that wireless sets, capable of being smuggled into camps and then hidden, would be useful for escape. While attempting to test miniature radio sets, Hutton was apprehended by police on Ilkley Moor. He was taken to Leeds where he was warned to discontinue the tests.
- Several devices were developed for use by the Special Operations Executive after Hutton met Percy Charles Pickard, the captain who flew the Vickers Wellington bomber "F for Freddie" in the 1941 RAF film Target for Tonight. These inventions included a portable torch for marking landing strips which was disguised as a bicycle pump, a similar torch containing a hollow section to conceal strips of camera film, and hemispherical plastic bowls coated on the convex side with phosphorescent paint to be used as wind direction markers for incoming aircraft.
- Hutton had the idea of concealing an existing model of miniature camera within a cigarette lighter. He had the prototype of the camera-lighter made by Blunts, the London East End firm that had developed miniature compasses. These cameras were smuggled into POW camps in Germany and Italy.
- The PIAT gun was a low-cost anti-tank weapon designed in 1942 by Lieutenant Colonel Stewart Blacker, who enlisted Hutton's assistance to locate the necessary steel tubing and other materials. Hutton was also asked to help arrange the construction of a prototype.
- Miniature blowpipe and darts, which Hutton claimed was developed for a Free French officer. The idea was for French Resistance personnel and their sympathisers to harass occupying German troops and officials by mingling in crowds and blowing darts made from gramophone needles at their faces or other exposed skin. An untrue rumour would be circulated that the needles had poisoned tips. A prototype was given to the French officer but Hutton was forbidden to continue production on the grounds of suspected infringement of the Geneva Convention.

== Dispatching equipment ==
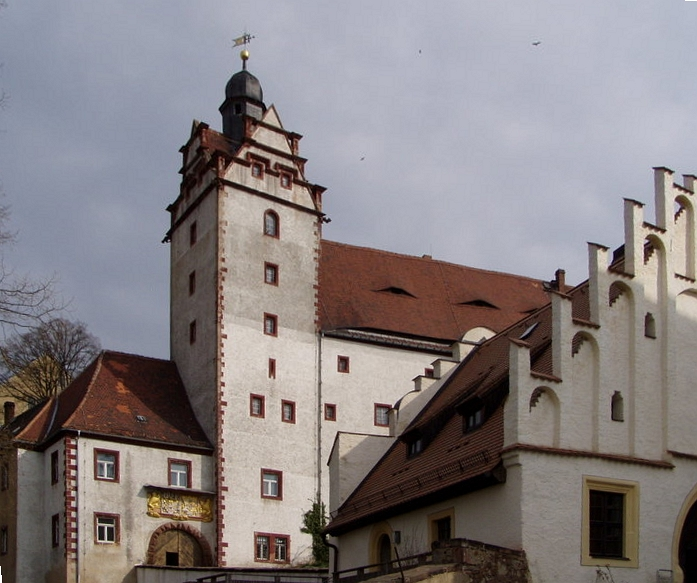
Oflag IV-C, more commonly known as Colditz Castle

The Geneva Convention allowed prisoners to receive parcels from families and relief organisations. Crockatt, the head of MI9, was very strict about not using Red Cross parcels for of fear of reprisal if the hidden items were discovered. By 1940, MI9 had established that it needed to smuggle maps, currency and escape aids into the prison camps in large quantities. The tactics and concealment methods were developed by Hutton's technical team in collaboration with selected suppliers of maps, compasses, escape packs, clothing and various games sets and sports equipment. Card indexes were essential in keeping accurate records of the activities.

MI9 invented fictitious cover organisations through which packages could be delivered to the POW camps. Realistic letterheads for the stationery were developed and fictitious addresses, often at blitzed premises, were used. Letters from the fictitious donors often contained thinly veiled encouragement of escape. The prison camps permitted the return of signed receipts for the parcels, facilitating MI9 to track which items were able to be delivered into the camp. At first only genuine, unmodified goods were sent, allowing MI9 to gauge the timing and successful receipt of parcels. Care was taken to match packing materials, such as old newspapers, with the alleged locations of the fictitious donor organisations. Packaging was regularly altered to avoid suspicion. It took about three months for the first successes to be scored, enabling the delivery of illicit contents to begin.

One of the earliest companies to print silk maps for MI9 was John Waddington & Co. of Leeds. The company also held the licence in the UK of the U.S. board game Monopoly and therefore manufactured Monopoly boards with items hidden in them. Actual currency was sometimes hidden within the Monopoly money. MI9 approached EMI, a phonograph record company, to hide maps laminated in records. The selected records had to avoid composers who were condemned by the Nazis since such records might be confiscated.

A system of coded correspondence with the camps enabled customised escape maps and currency to be produced and delivered on demand. The clue to a coded letter lay in the form of the date, which, if abbreviated to numbers only, signified a coded message within the text. By December 1941, MI9 had established a network of over 900 coded letter writers in the POW camps. The correspondence backwards and forwards between MI9 and the camps could reach over 100 in any single month. The escape kits are credited with helping 316 escape attempts from Colditz Castle. Out of these attempts, 32 soldiers successfully escaped home. These included Airey Neave and Toni Luteyn, who were the first officers to succeed in returning to the UK.

== Opposition to publication ==
According to Hutton's account, his approach to the authorities for permission to give talks and publish his memoirs began without direct opposition. On 4 January 1950, he wrote to the Director of Military Intelligence (DMI) concerning his intentions and requesting an interview. Meanwhile, he collected examples of how escape and evasion equipment from the Second World War had already been publicised. This included material from the Sunday Dispatch, written in September 1945 by Flight Lieutenant R. Kee. Following his interview request with more evidence supporting his claim that nothing unknown would be revealed, Hutton stated that he found the DMI's staff less cooperative. He claimed he was given written permission on 31 January 1950 to give lectures on escape and evasion, including descriptions of the main tools such as maps, compasses, and altered uniforms.

His original idea for a book, written in the first half of 1950 and tentatively titled A journey has been arranged, included material on escapes during earlier conflicts as well as descriptions of his work in MI9. After he had completed the manuscript and had passed it to the publishers, he approached Sir Basil Embry, himself an escaper, to provide a foreword. Hutton's publishers were ordered to submit the draft to an Air Ministry Intelligence Staff committee, who forwarded it to the War Office. Embry wrote in support of Hutton; in addition to saying that Hutton's "revelations" were harmless, Embry challenged the then-common idea that equipment used in the Second World War might also be important in future conflicts. Hutton wrote that he felt "enmeshed in a labyrinth of minor officials."

Hutton was issued a written warning about infringing the Official Secrets Act and was ordered to return all documents, lecture notes, and drafts concerning his military service. In June 1951, Hutton was summoned to court. Embry agreed to accompany him there. Hutton alleges that around this time he revealed to detectives some letters showing that a selection of escape aids had been sent to Buckingham Palace for the private Royal Museum. The prosecuting lawyers handling his case for the Director of Public Prosecutions became aware of the possibility of embarrassing high-ranking officers. Hutton asserts that the case was withdrawn for this reason. Despite the withdrawal, Hutton still faced opposition in his effort to publish.

The Air Ministry attempted to have Hutton's writings banned from publication in the US, as well as in the UK. He applied for a visa to go to the US in 1953, but permission was withheld for three years. In November 1955 Hutton was telephoned by the military correspondent of the Daily Express who told him that a book entitled The Hidden Catch had just been published by an author named Charles Connell. The correspondent recognised the content as an account of Hutton's own work in MI9. The publishers had been induced to submit the draft to the Air Ministry, which redacted about two-thirds of the content. They also insisted on the use of the alternative author, with Hutton referred to in the text as "Mr. X". The Air Ministry also inserted a disclaimer that Hutton's methods and decisions were questionable. Hutton sought an injunction in the High Court to block the publication and sales of further copies. Hutton won the case and was granted copyright, authorship and the right to publish the work without the disclaimer that he regarded as libelous. The terms were awarded on 13 January 1956. Hutton writes of the incident as a "pyrhhic victory" which "sent up my blood pressure several points."

Eventually, Hutton instructed a solicitor to try to determine the name of the Air Ministry official who had ordered the interventions. In addition, he personally sent another enraged telegram. He was interviewed by Air Ministry security officers, one of whom, Hutton alleges, said that in the defence of Crown Secrets even untrue "facts" could be stated. Hutton finally concluded that he "had come to the end of this particular road".

After eight years of obstruction Hutton's autobiography, Official Secret, was eventually published in 1960. The last three chapters describe his fight to publish the book. Specific facts illustrating why the post-war security officials were uneasy may have been omitted, such as what he had already described on his lecture tours to the United States. Hutton also makes no mention of Per Ardua Libertas, the catalog of escape and evasion tools that was produced for a visiting US delegation to Wilton Park. A publisher's note states that "...it was obvious that here was a case in which we had a moral obligation to see that the author should, after years of frustration and disappointment, be allowed to tell his remarkable story and to receive recognition that had been denied to him by those who should have known better".

== Final years ==
After the publication of Official Secret, Hutton retired to Ashburton, Devon, on the eastern side of Dartmoor. He died of a brain haemorrhage on 3 September 1965 at the Royal Devon and Exeter Hospital, Exeter. He was buried in Devon.

== In the media ==
A two-part February 1963 episode of the American television series GE True, entitled "Escape", featured Hutton's escape aids.

Hutton's role during the war was highlighted on the popular BBC Quiz QI, in the January 2010 Episode 8, Series G "Germany".

Some silk maps were made into items such as dresses and lampshades after the war.

== See also ==
- Charles Fraser-Smith, inventor who worked for Special Operations Executive
- Jasper Maskelyne, stage magician who claimed to have used stage magic to help defeat the Nazis
