= Sedgley OSS .38 =

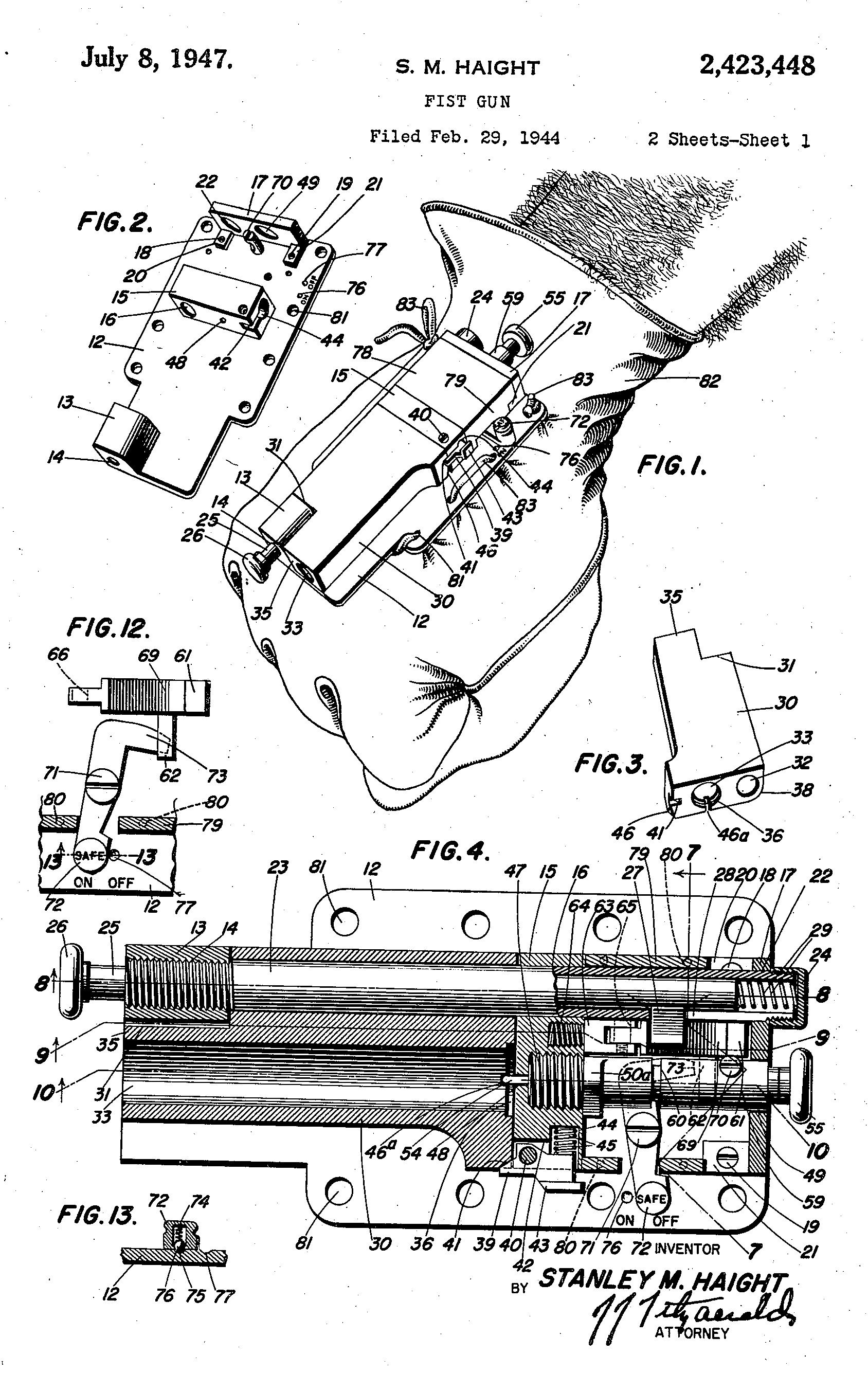
- Illustration of the Haight Fist Gun in its US Patent document
- Type: Assassination pistol, last resort weapon
- Place of origin: United States

Service history
- Used by: OSS
- Wars: World War II

Production history
- Designer: Office of U.S. Naval Intelligence
- Manufacturer: Sedgley Company
- No. built: 52–200

Specifications
- Cartridge: .38 Special
- Action: Single Shot, Break Barrel

The Sedgley OSS .38 glove pistol or Sedgley Mk2 is a World War II firearm. It was designed by Stanley M. Haight and manufactured by Sedgley Co. of Philadelphia, working with the Research and Development Branch of the Office of Strategic Services (OSS) and the Office of Naval Intelligence (ONI), for use by the U.S. Marines and the U.S. Navy. Its official designation by the US Navy was Hand Firing Mechanism, Mk 2.

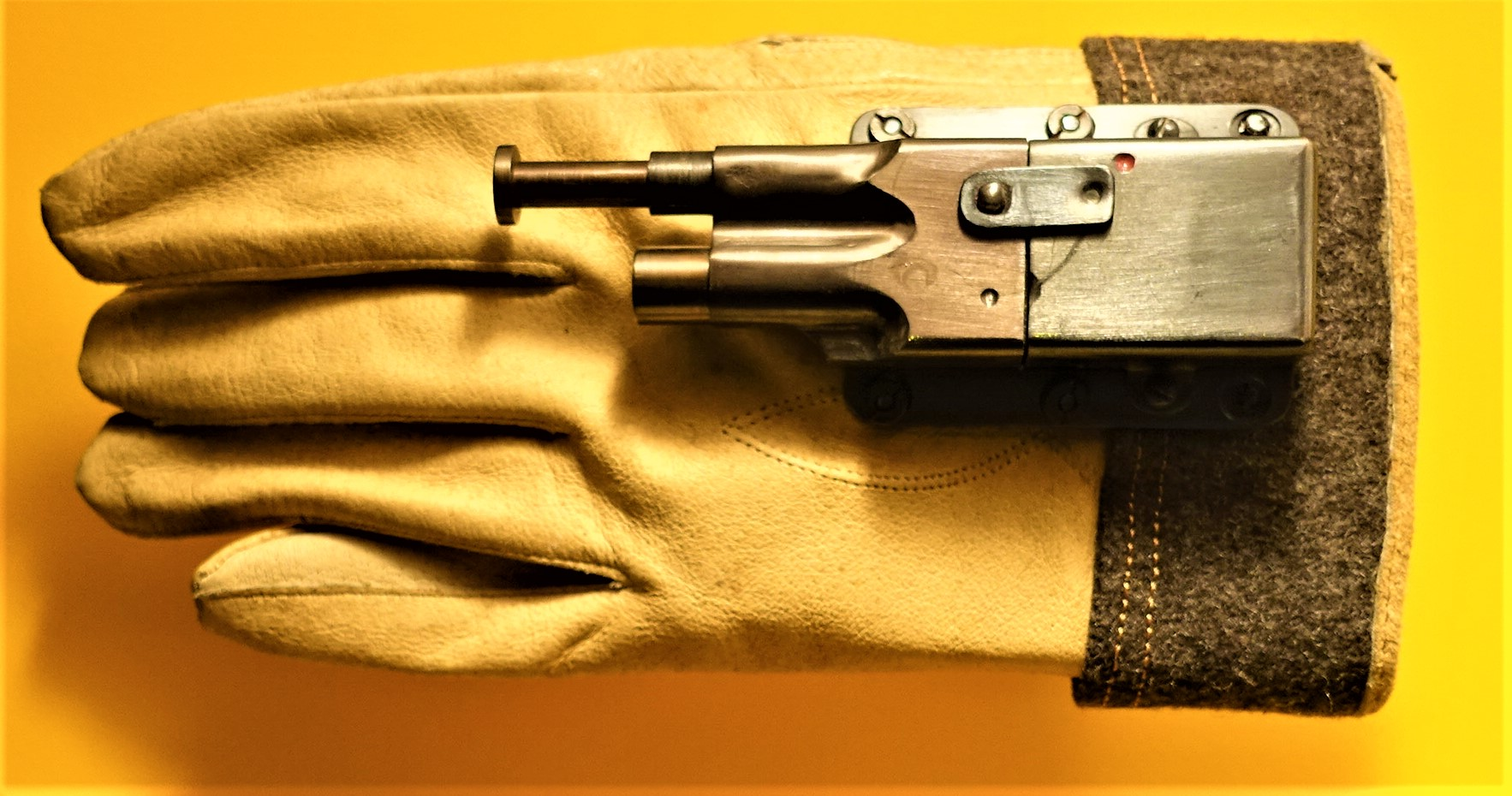
Sedgley OSS .38 glove pistol

== Description ==
The Sedgley OSS is a single-shot, break-action, smoothbore .38 Special pistol which was designed by Stanley M. Haight for the Office of Naval Intelligence. It was meant as a covert operation and assassination weapon in the Pacific Theater. It was mounted on the back of a cowhide glove; a long-sleeved coat would usually be worn to hide the weapon. It was commonly nicknamed "Glove Pistol" or "Glove Gun".

The trigger is a bar parallel to and extending past the barrel. After being loaded and cocked, the weapon is fired by the shooter making a fist and pressing the trigger against the target's body. Between 52 and 200 are believed to have been manufactured.

It was later copied by the KGB.

== In fiction and popular culture ==
The Sedgley OSS is seen in the Quentin Tarantino World War II alternate history film Inglourious Basterds. The film centers on elements of the First Special Service Force operating under orders from the OSS dropping behind German lines to conduct a political assassination of Nazi high-command. Two Sedgley OSS weapons are utilized near the film's climax, including one loaded, concealed, and used by a character played by the actor Eli Roth and another used without concealment.

== See also ==
- Apache revolver
- Protector Palm Pistol
