= Charles Fraser-Smith =

British inventor

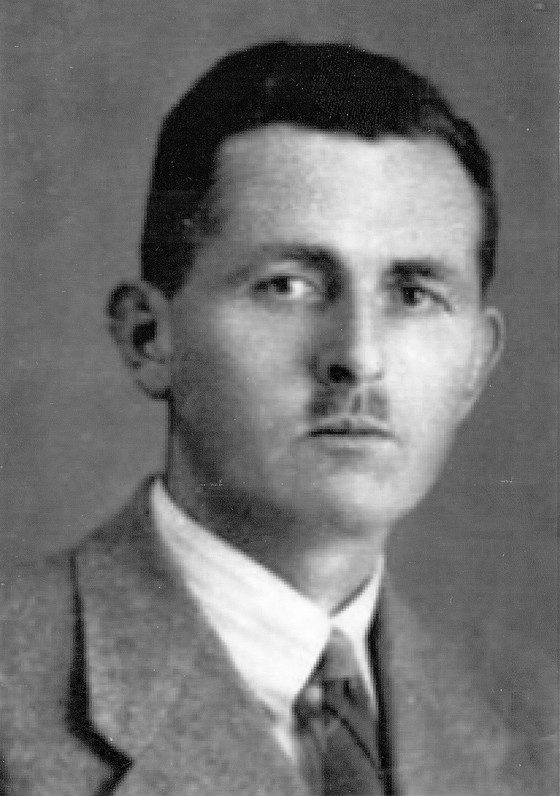

Chief of Q Devices Section XV, Special Operations Executive
- In office 1940–1945

Quartermaster (Q) civil servant, CT6, Ministry of Supply
- In office 1939–1992

Personal details
- Born: 26 January 1904
- Died: 9 November 1992 (aged 88)

Charles Fraser-Smith (26 January 1904 – 9 November 1992) was an author and one-time missionary who is widely credited as being the inspiration for Ian Fleming's James Bond quartermaster Q. During World War II, Fraser-Smith worked for the Ministry of Supply, fabricating equipment nicknamed "Q-devices" (after Q-ships) for SOE agents operating in occupied Europe. His office also collaborated in many projects alongside the American Stan Lovell and the OSS R&D Branch in devices to be fielded by the US military. Prior to the war, Fraser-Smith had worked as a missionary in North Africa. After the war he purchased a dairy farm in Burrington, Devon, where he died in 1992.

== Early life ==
Charles Fraser-Smith was the son of a solicitor who owned a wholesale grocery business; he was orphaned at age seven. He was then brought up by a Christian missionary family in Croxley Green in Hertfordshire. He went to school at Brighton College, where he was described as "scholastically useless except for woodwork and science and making things."

On leaving school he veered from one occupation after another, working as a prep school teacher in Portsmouth, a motorcycle messenger rider, and an aircraft factory worker. Eventually, inspired by his foster family, he went to Morocco as a Christian missionary. Returning to England in 1939, he gave a Sunday sermon at the Open Brethren Evangelical Church in Leeds. In the sermon, Fraser-Smith described his practice of bricolage, and the necessity of procuring supplies from just about any source. In the congregation were two officials of Britain's Ministry of Supply, who were impressed by his adventures. As a result, the Director of the Ministry of Supply offered him what he later described as "a funny job in London".

== Wartime experiences ==
Officially, Fraser-Smith was a temporary civil servant for the Ministry of Supply's Clothing and Textile Department (Dept. CT6). In reality, he developed and supplied gadgets and other equipment for section XV of Britain's World War II intelligence organisation, the Special Operations Executive. Travelling by train from his home in Hertfordshire to a small office in the clothing department of the Ministry of Supply, near St. James's Park in London, Fraser-Smith was actually working at the direction of MI6 in the nearby Minimax House. Performing a job so secret that neither his secretary nor his boss knew what he was doing, Fraser-Smith invented numerous ingenious gadgets intended to help prisoners of war to escape and to aid SOE agents gathering information on Nazi activities in occupied Europe.

His first order was to counterfeit Spanish Army uniforms for a proposed SOE plan to infiltrate agents into neutral Spain to prevent it from entering the war on the side of Germany. He dealt directly with the textile suppliers; ultimately using more than 300 firms in and around London: many of them had no idea what they were making or why, to make equipment for secret operations.

Initially Fraser-Smith supplied clothing and standard props (from second-hand sources) for SOE agents working behind enemy lines, but SOE directives and his taste for gadgetry led him to develop a wide range of spy and escape devices, including miniature cameras inside cigarette lighters, shaving brushes containing film, hairbrushes containing a map and saw, pencils containing maps, pens containing hidden compasses, steel shoelaces that doubled as garrottes or gigli saws, an asbestos-lined pipe for carrying secret documents, and much more.

Directed to make copies of a new type of Luftwaffe life jacket, he made discoveries that were subsequently incorporated as standard in RAF "Mae Wests", including the use of a compressed air cylinder for inflating the jacket and a pouch filled with a powerful fluorescent dye for spotting of a downed airman at sea.

In an example of lateral thinking, Fraser-Smith used a special left-hand thread for the disguised screw-off top of a hidden-document container; he suggested this would prevent discovery by the "unswerving logic of the German mind", as no German would ever think of trying to unscrew something the wrong way.

At one point his expenses were challenged by a senior Treasury official over the extravagant costs of an order for packets of 12 razor blades. Fraser-Smith asked for a treasury costing clerk to accompany him on a visit to the company to determine whether or not they were profiteering. After checking that the clerk had signed the Official Secrets Act, the clerk reviewed the costs, which were in fact for a top-secret kit designed to aid SOE agents with escape and evasion. The clerk discovered that the company was in fact undercharging as they had not claimed the regulation profit. As a result, the supplier was directed to submit a new invoice with every item fully justified that, including the proper profit, was therefore greater than the original. Fraser-Smith never had a bill queried after that.

Fraser-Smith later estimated that 50% of the orders he received were exact specifications, 40% were approximate specifications and 10% were his own idea. He called his inventions "Q gadgets", after the Q ships, warships disguised as freighters, which were deployed in the First World War. This may have been the basis of Ian Fleming's use of "Q" to refer to the suppliers of James Bond's gadgetry.

Fraser-Smith was not the only gadget-master working for British intelligence during World War II. The SOE had various secret research and development laboratories including Station IX at the Natural History Museum and Station XII at the Frythe Hotel. Christopher Clayton Hutton of MI9, a clandestine unit within A-Force which specialised in escape and evasion, was also an inventor and deception-theorist. Major Jasper Maskelyne, a stage magician, also developed secret sabotage and subterfuge devices for MI-9.

=== Operation Mincemeat ===
Fraser was also involved in the intelligence operation codenamed Operation Mincemeat, which was designed to drop a body, carrying false papers to mislead the Nazis, off the Spanish coast. He was tasked with designing a trunk, 6' 2" long and 3' wide, to carry a "deadweight" of 200 lb that would be preserved in dry ice. When the dry ice evaporated, it filled the canister with carbon dioxide and drove out any oxygen, thus preserving the body without refrigeration. The plot was the basis of the book (and later film) The Man Who Never Was and the 2021 film Operation Mincemeat.

== Later life ==
After the war, Fraser-Smith bought a rundown dairy farm in Bratton Fleming, in southwest England. It became a profitable business. In the late 1970s, his family persuaded him to seek permission to write a book about his wartime exploits. With clearance under the Official Secrets Act he wrote several, donating the royalties to charity.

He had kept examples of most of his gadgets, and an exhibit of his wartime works was presented at the Exmoor Steam Railway, a tourist attraction in Bratton Fleming. Once a year, Fraser-Smith would spend a week explaining their workings to visitors.

Charles Fraser-Smith died at his home of undisclosed causes in 1992, survived by his wife, Selina, and two children, Brian and Christine, by a previous marriage to Blanche Ellis. Live and Let's Spy: An exhibition of spy, escape and survival gadgetry, an exhibition of his work, created at Dover Castle by English Heritage, ran for two years in the late 1990s.

== Sources ==
- The Secret War of Charles Fraser-Smith, by Charles Fraser-Smith (Paternoster Press, ISBN 0-85364-409-8)
- Secret Warriors – MI6, OSS, MI9, SOE & SAS, by Charles Fraser-Smith (Paternoster Press, ISBN 0-85364-393-8)
- The Man Who Was 'Q', by David Porter (Paternoster Press, 1970, ASIN: B000PDLSX0)
- Official secret: The remarkable story of escape aids, their invention, production, and the sequel, by Clayton Hutton (Crown Publishers, 1961, ASIN: B0007DU032).
