= Pistol sword =

Sword with a pistol or revolver attached

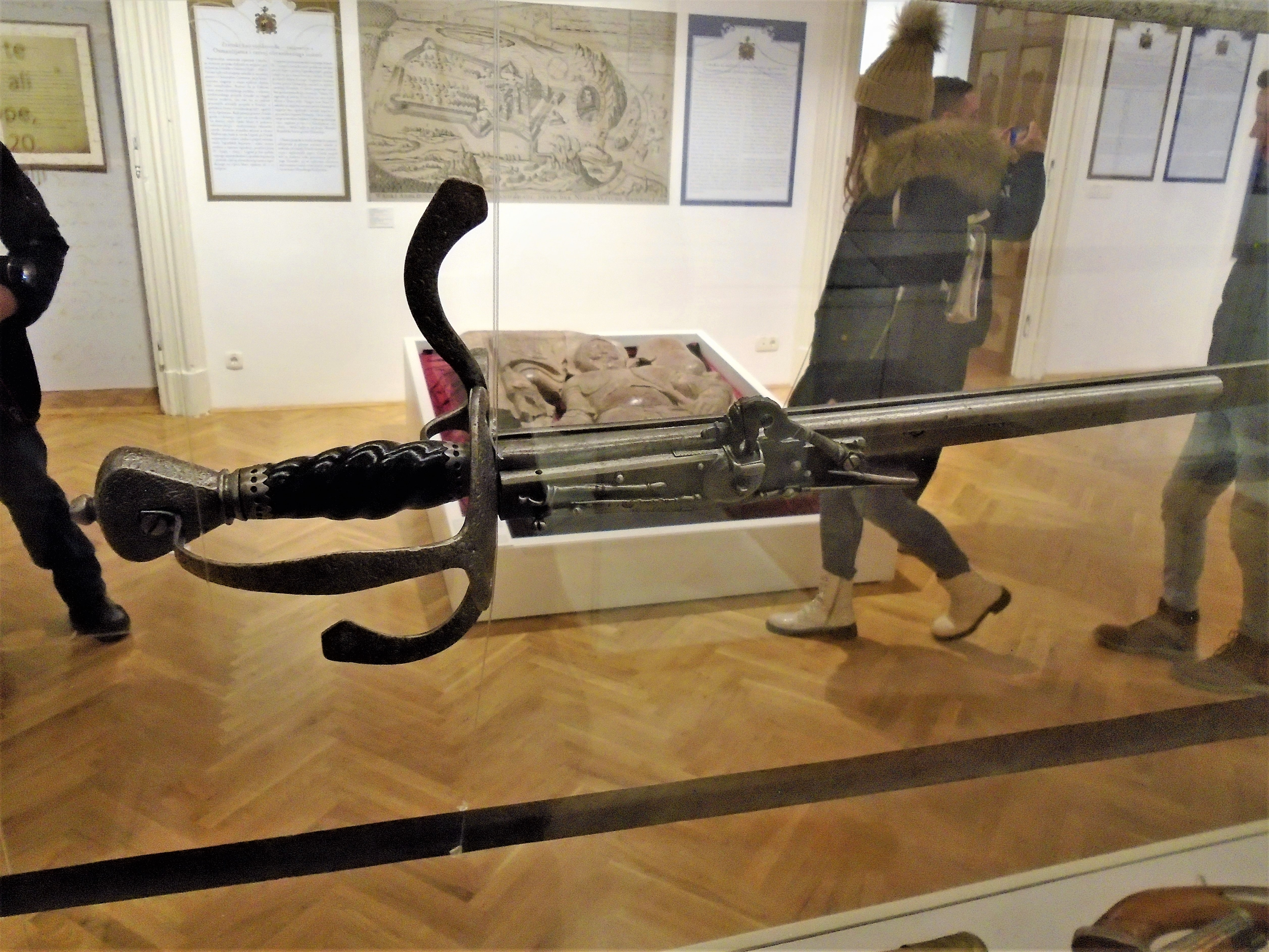
- Sword with built-in flint wheellock pistol made in Solingen, Germany (1575)
- Place of origin: Solingen

Production history
- Produced: 1575

Specifications
- Blade type: Double-edged; Single-edged
- Head type: Steel

A pistol sword is a sword with a pistol or revolver attached, usually parallel to the blade. It differs from a rifle with a bayonet attached, in that the weapon is designed primarily for use as a sword, and the firearm component is typically considered a secondary weapon designed to be an addition to the blade, rather than the sword being a secondary addition to the pistol. In addition, the two components of these weapons typically cannot be separated, unlike most bayonets mounted on rifles.

== History ==
Historically, some flintlock pistols of the 17th and 18th centuries were constructed as gun-swords, with the barrel of the pistol attached to the side of the blade of a shortsword or dagger. A shell guard protected the firing mechanism when it was used as a sword. These were used by French and German hunters to kill wounded wild boar. Examples of these weapons can be found in the armoury of Wawel Castle (Kraków, Poland). Similar weapons were made in India, including the katar (कटार), a thrusting dagger, modern variants of which may feature a single-shot pistol built into one side.

=== Military use ===
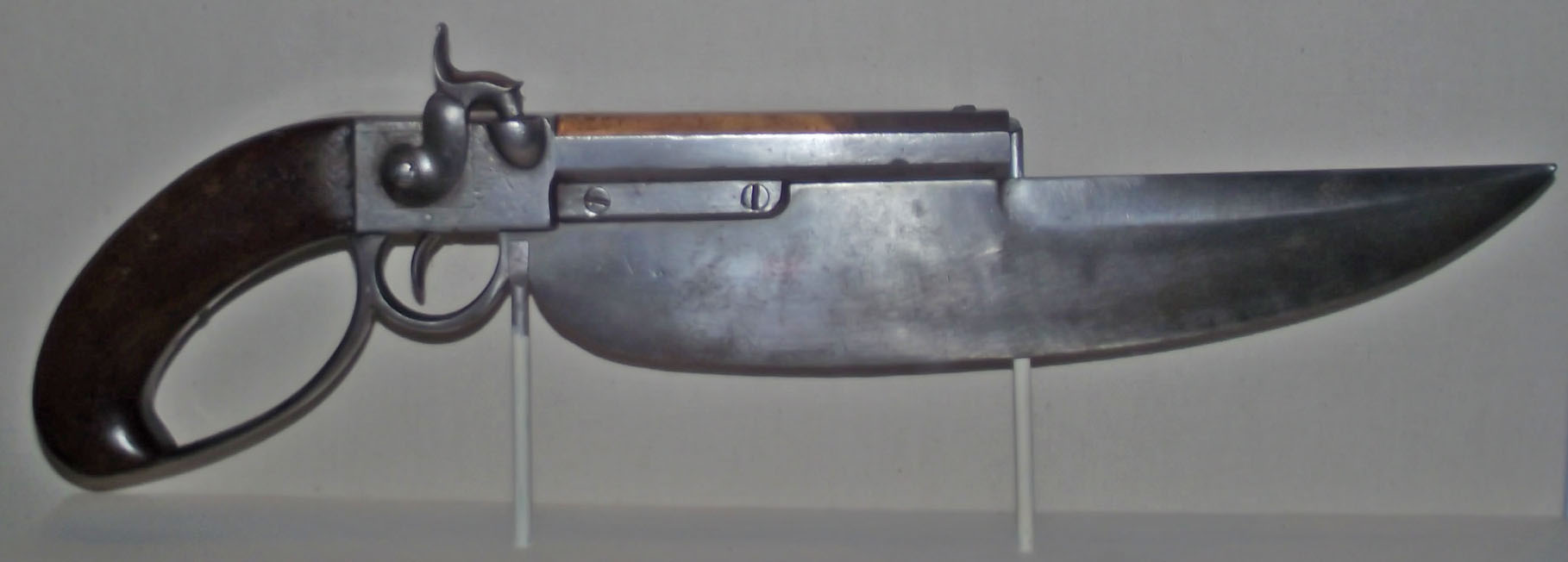
Elgin cutlass pistol at the Mariners' Museum and Park in Newport News, Virginia

In 1838, the United States Navy developed the .54 caliber, single-shot smoothbore Elgin pistol, which was equipped with an 11.5-inch Bowie knife blade and was intended for use by boarding parties. It was the first percussion cap gun in naval service, but only 150 were made. The Navy specifically intended them for the Wilkes-South Seas expedition. Reportedly, in 1840 a naval landing party used the pistol to good effect when Fijian warriors attacked the sailors on the island of Malolo. A few Elgin pistols were still in use during the US Civil War, but proved unpopular. The Navy quickly replaced them with the M1860 Cutlass, which remained in service until the 1940s. Some found their way into civilian hands and some ended up in the Old West.

Pinfire cartridge gun-swords were produced in Belgium during the mid-19th century, although in limited quantity. These custom-made weapons were sometimes used by European officers and featured a loading gate behind the basket hilt. In 1866 T. Rauh of Solingen filed a United States patent on the design of a 9mm caliber pistol sword with a 32in blade.

During World War I, the British manufactured a limited number of Webley revolvers with folding blades, similar in design to the Pritchard pistol bayonet. These were used by officers in the trenches for close quarters fighting as the confined space made it difficult to use a sword. However, few were produced due to the expense and scarcity of raw materials.

A rare variant of the World War II Japanese Nambu automatic pistol was a pistol sword. It is possible that this non-regulation weapon was privately purchased by an officer as only one example is known to exist.

=== Civilian use ===
Another notable example of a pistol sword was the Swedish 1865 Cutlass Pistol; 500 were ordered by the government and issued to prison guards. It was a breech-loading 2-shot weapon with a 14in by 2in blade weighing 2.5 lb. A few ended up on the other side of the Atlantic and one became part of Buffalo Bill's gun collection.

In the late Victorian era, some French swordsticks had built-in pinfire pepperbox revolvers to increase their lethality; these were carried by civilians for self-defense. However, this idea was far from new; combination swordsticks and wheel lock pistols have been in use since the 16th century.

== Disadvantages ==
Pistol swords were not widely used and became uncommon relatively quickly, due to their expense and because instead of getting two weapons in one, one got a heavy pistol and a heavy, off-balance sword, as shown by the poor performance of the Elgin pistol.

Modern versions occasionally appear on the market, however, as novelties or collector's items, including the Sierra Madre knife pistol.

== Similar weapons ==
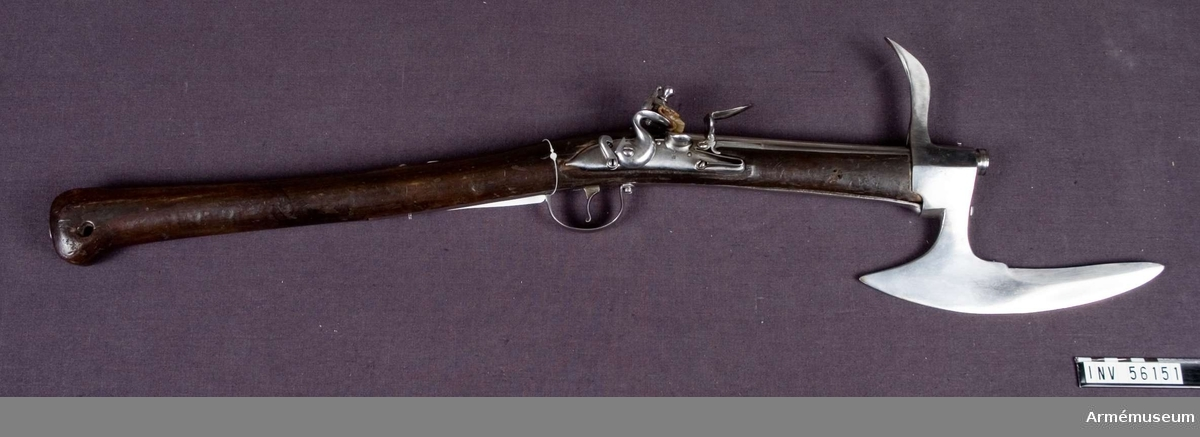
Flintlock axe pistol.

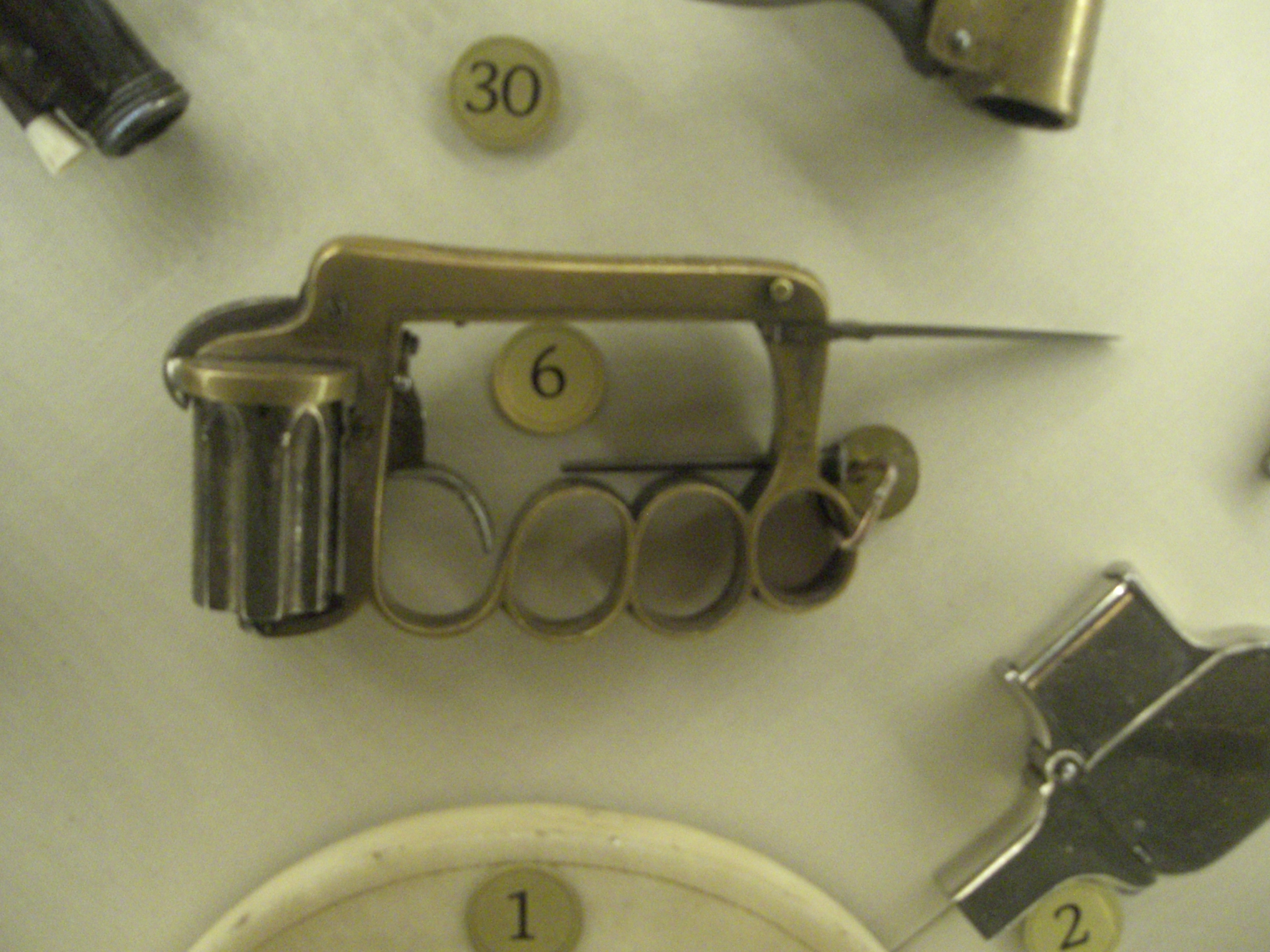
Apache pepperbox knuckleduster was popular among turn-of-the-century French street gangs.

- Edged weapons with built-in pistols were common in Eastern Europe. The flintlock axe pistol (or gun axe) was a trademark Polish cavalry weapon from the 16th until the 18th century. Similar guns were made in Hungary and a multi-barreled version was invented in Germany. Axe pistols, invented in 1703 by Admiral Erich Sioblad, were also issued to the Swedish navy from the early 18th century until 1840.
- Some linstocks of the Renaissance and late medieval period had a matchlock pistol concealed in the blade.
- Henry VIII's bodyguards were equipped with iron round shields fitted with a pistol. The English also combined pistols with maces. A notable example is Henry VIII's Walking Staff, a 3-barreled pistol and morning star. According to legends that arose decades later, the king would supposedly carry it while walking through the city at night to check up on the constables. Henry's mace pistol is now on display in the Tower of London's Tudor Room.
- In the late 19th century, members of Parisian street gangs carried Apache revolvers, a combination of knife, revolver and knuckleduster.
- Knife pistols with folding blades were popular in England during the mid-Victorian era. These were made by Unwin and Rodgers, used black powder, and were available in various small calibers. Like the modern Swiss Army knife, they contained a variety of tools, from blades to corkscrews, and were often used by sailors. A modern version that fires .22 caliber rimfire cartridges, known as the Defender, is still in production.
- Belgian gunsmiths made revolvers with Bowie knife blades, some of which were used by French officers during the Crimean War and Franco-Prussian War.

== Gallery ==
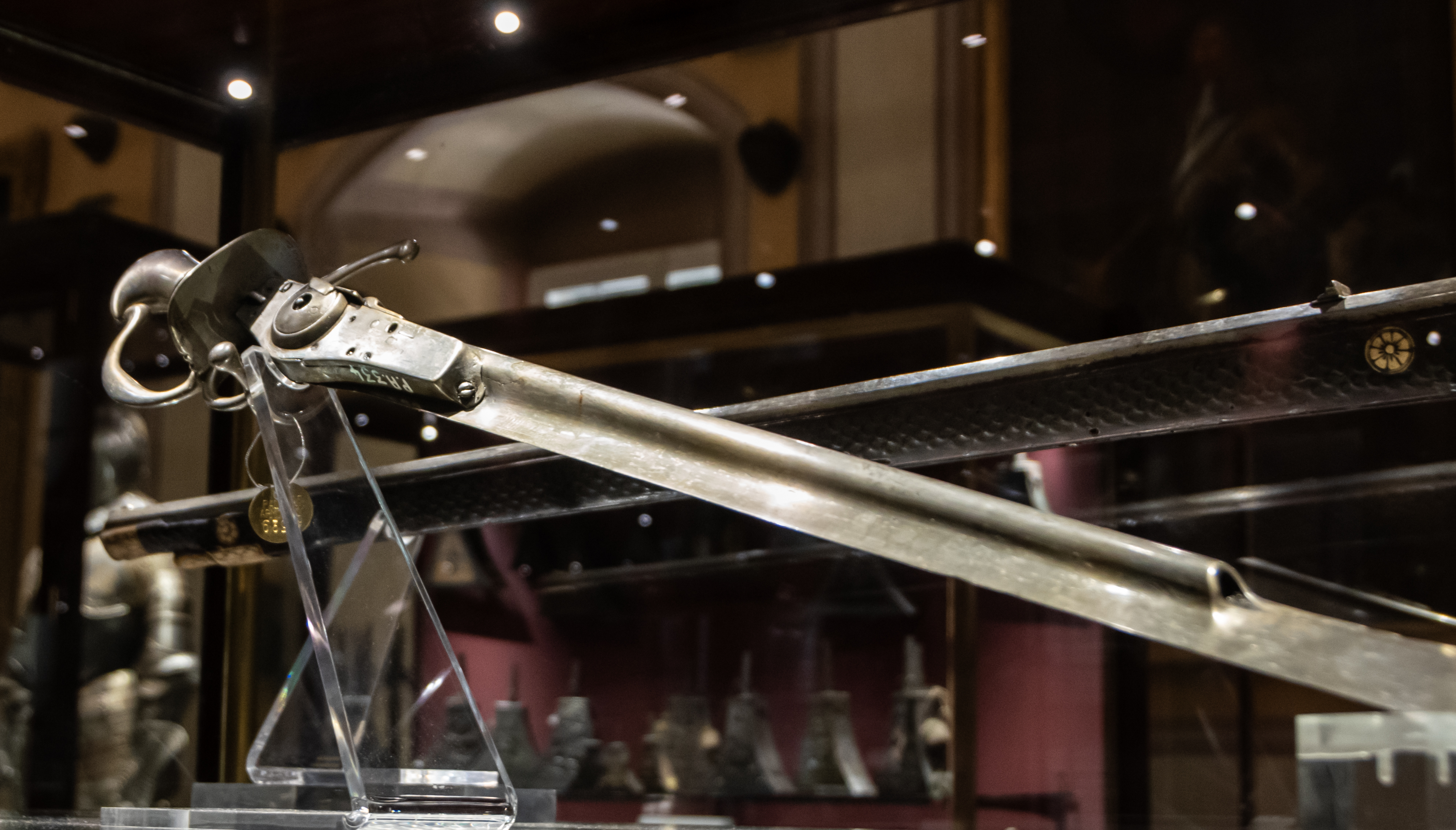
German hunting sword with wheellock, c. 1550, displayed at the Palace Armoury in Valletta, Malta.

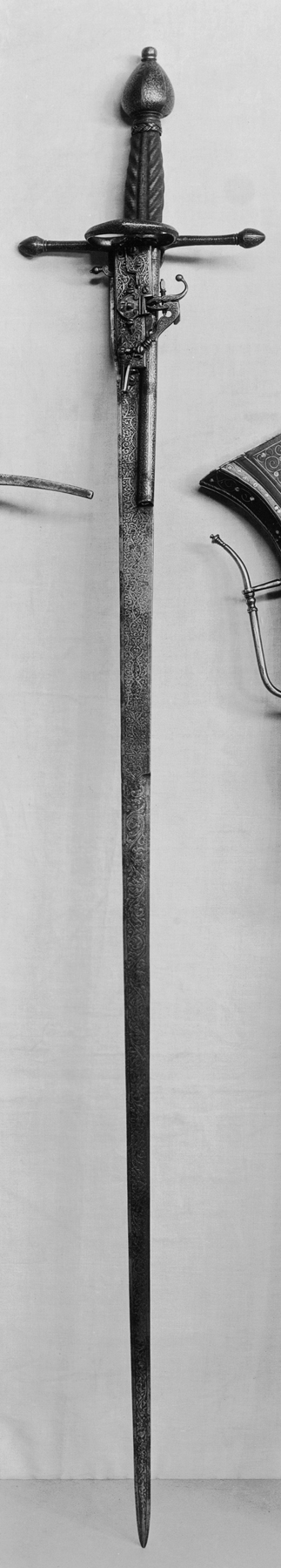
German sword pistol, 1580s.

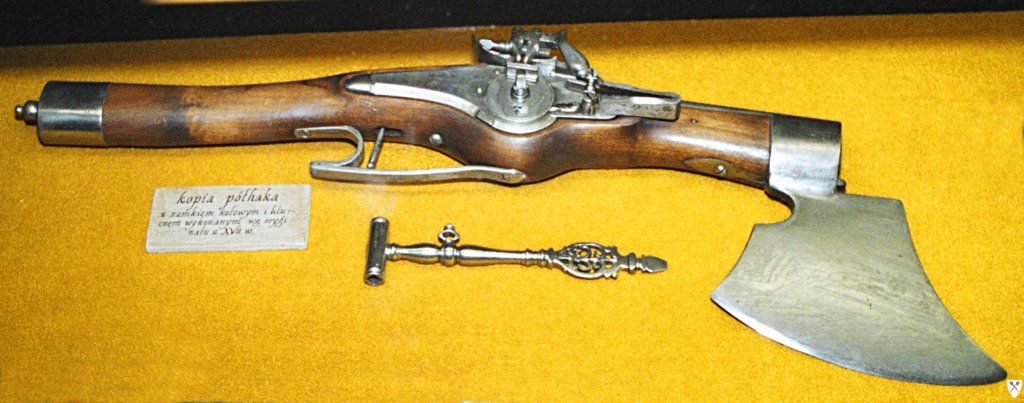
Polish axe pistol replica, 17th century.

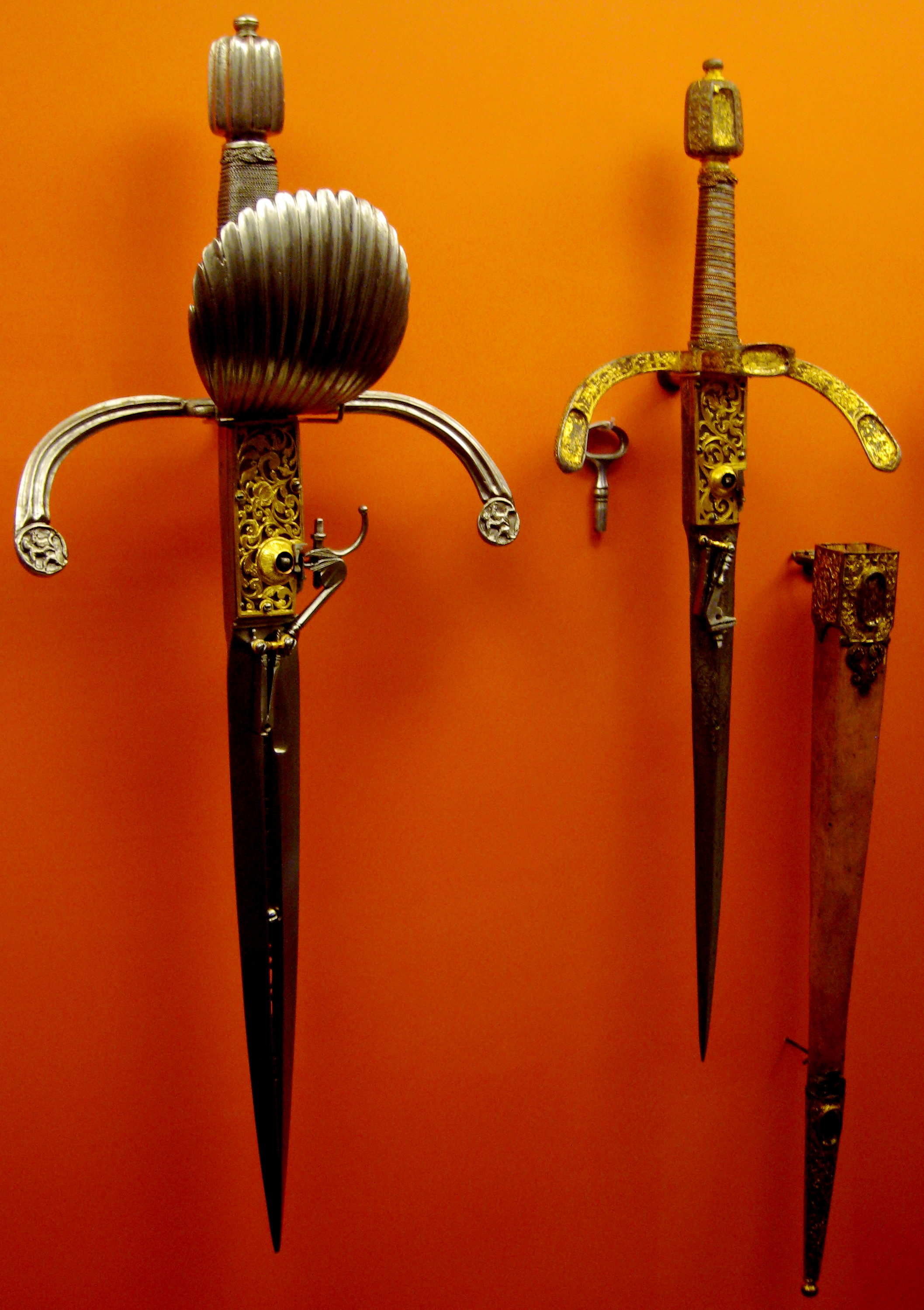
German knife pistol, 1600s.

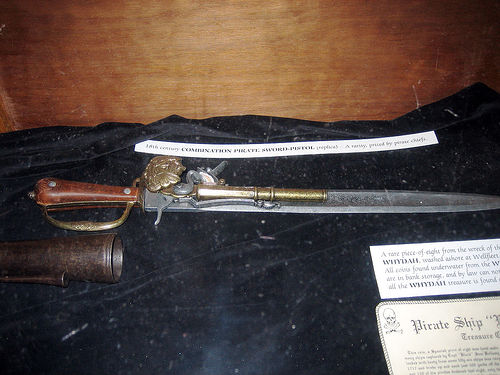
Replica of an 18th-century pistol cutlass.

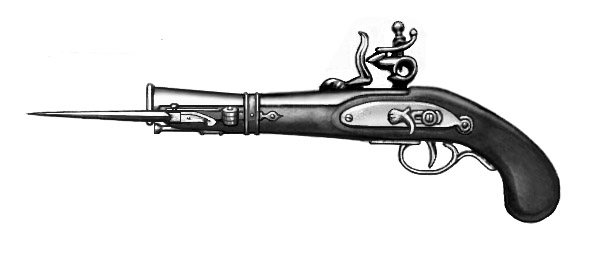
Georgian knife pistol with spring-loaded blade similar to the modern switchblade.

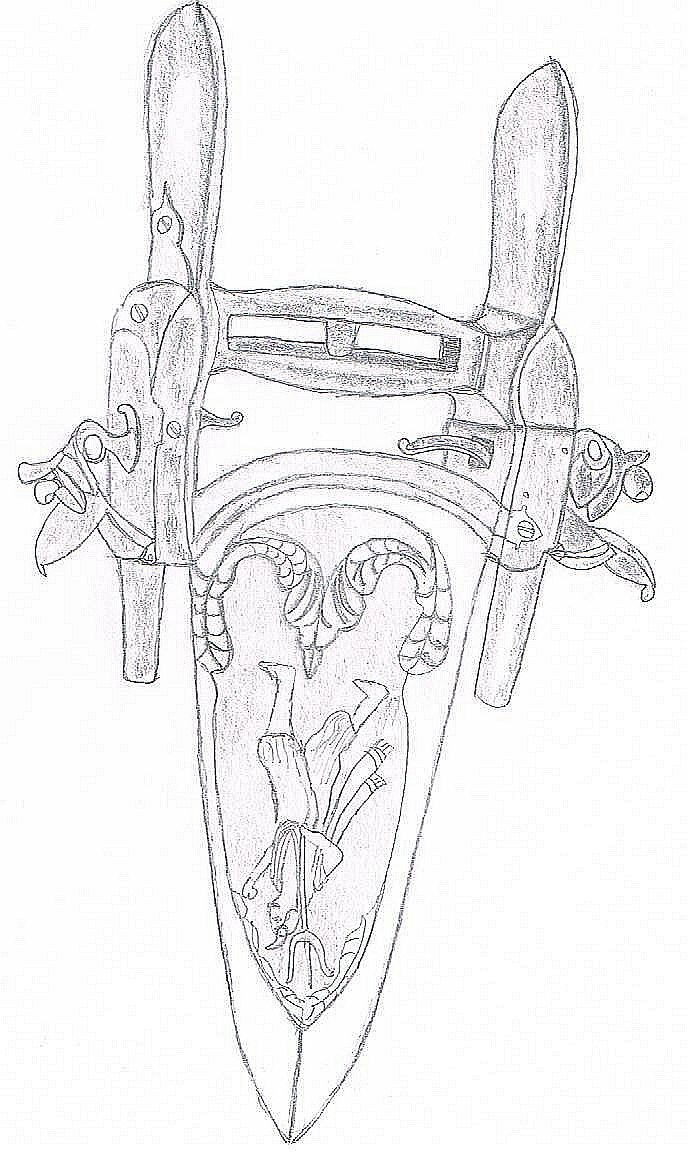
Indian pistol katar.

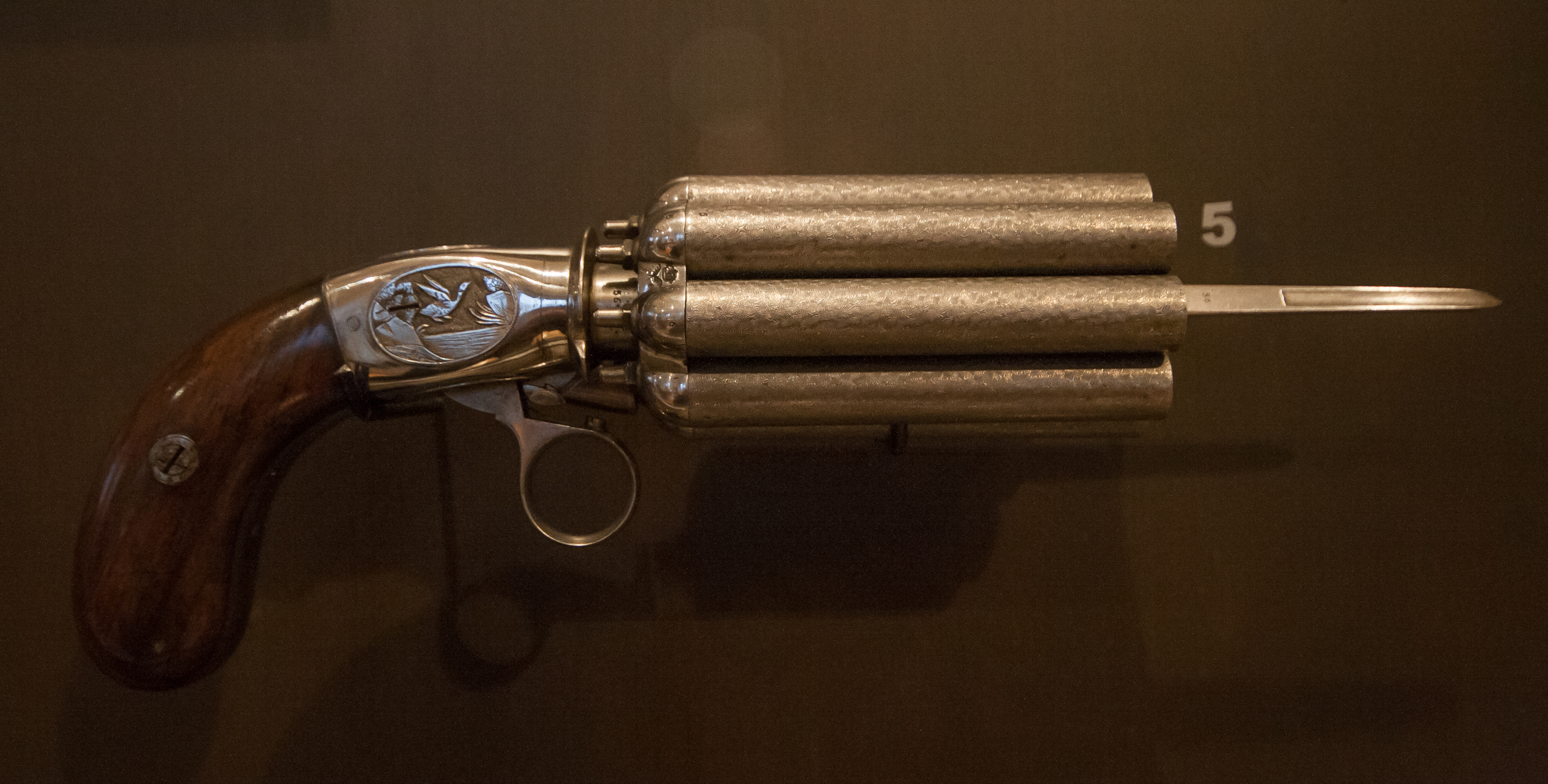
1850s Belgian pepperbox with stiletto blade.

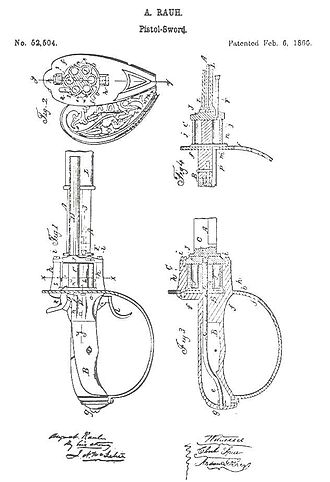
Rauh's sword revolver, late 19th century.

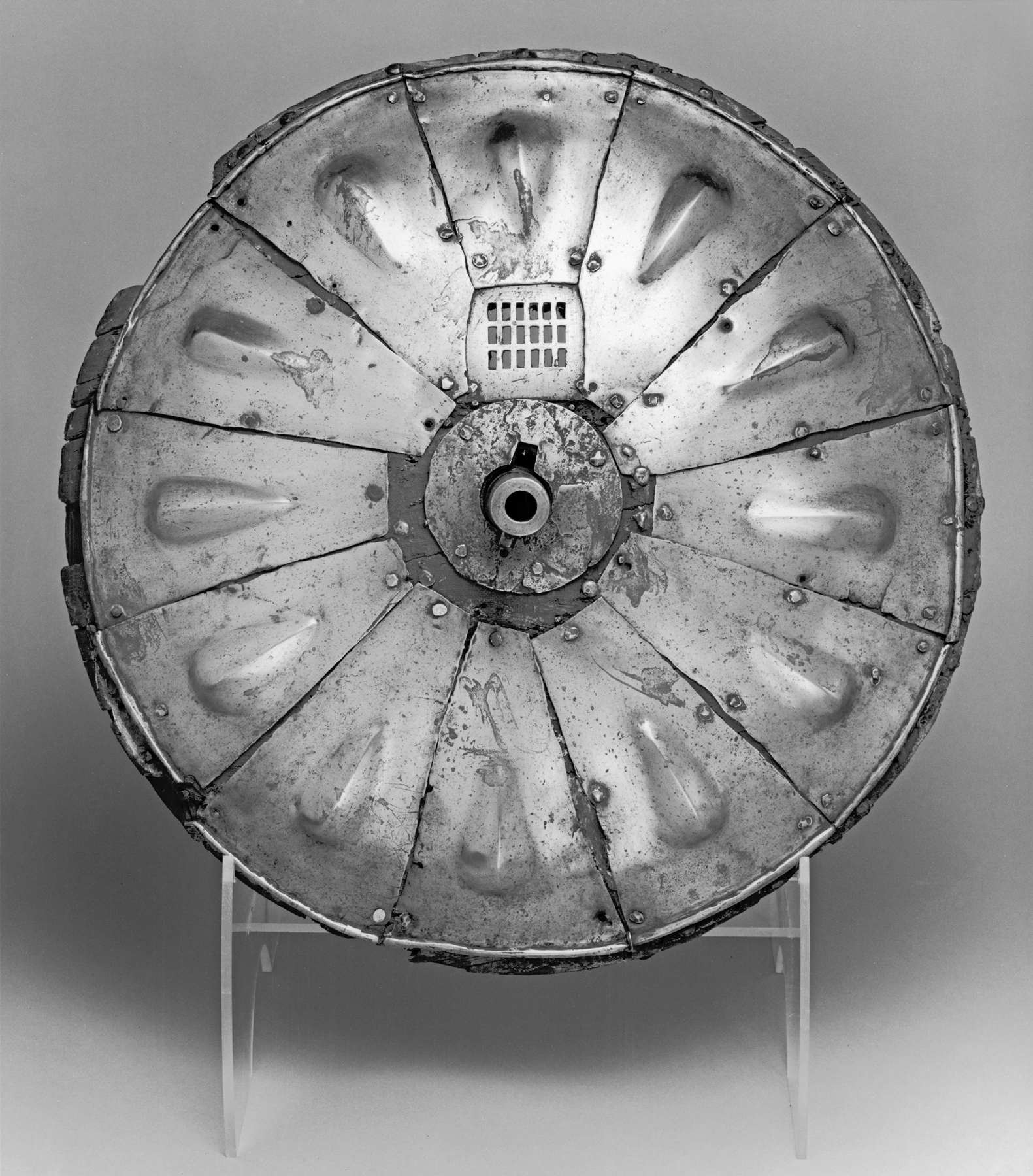
Henry VIII's shield pistol, c.1544.
