= Camp Cherry Valley =

Camp on Catalina Island, California

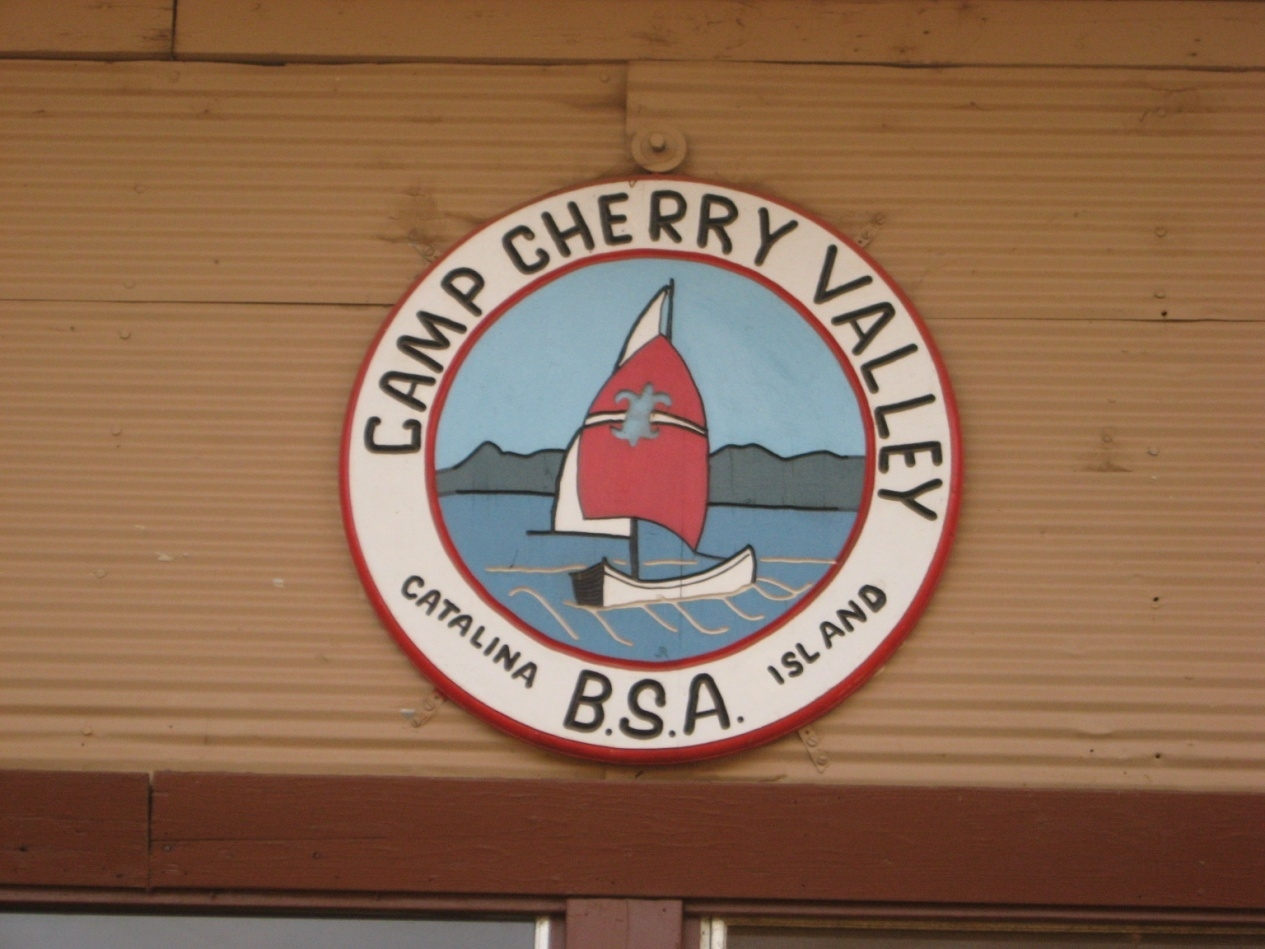
- Location: Santa Catalina Island, California
- Coordinates: 33.4503°N 118.503°W
- Founded: 1921
- Website campcherryvalley.org

Camp Cherry Valley is a summer camp on the leeward side of Catalina Island, California, which is owned and operated by the Greater Los Angeles Area Council of the Boy Scouts of America. It is located two coves north of Two Harbors at Cherry Cove. The camp, valley and cove get their name from the Catalina cherry trees native to the island. It also offers non-Scouting programs on a year-round basis.

== Overview ==
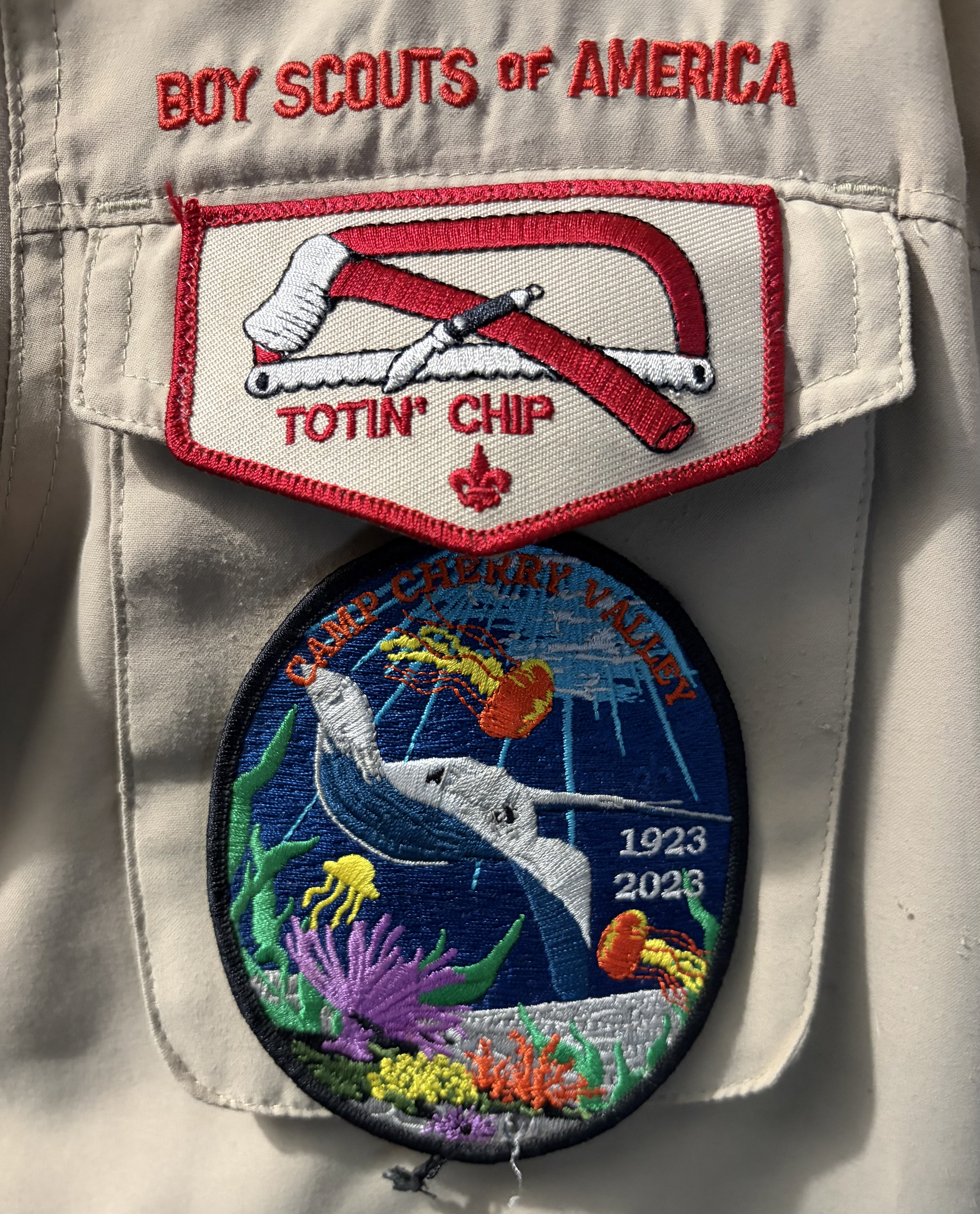
A Camp Cherry Valley 100 Year Patch on a BSA Uniform

Camp Cherry Valley has operated as a Boy Scout camp since the 1920s, but other groups use it as well. CIMI, the Catalina Island Marine Institute, runs a program from September through November, taking a winter break then recommencing February through May. The CIMI program caters to youth groups other than Boy Scouts. Being right on the Pacific Ocean, the camp allows superb snorkeling and scuba diving. During the summer the calm waters stay around seventy degrees Fahrenheit. Scouts sleep in two-person canvas tents set on wooden platforms located up the canyon under the cherry trees.

To reach the camp, Scouts take a two-hour chartered ferry across the channel, a 22-mile distance from San Pedro or Long Beach to Two Harbors and then hike 1.3 miles to the camp. The camp promotes itself to scouts with the Tribe of Torqua. The "Tribe" was instituted by Council Executive H. Benjamin "Skipper" Robinson as a special group of honor campers.

In 2024, Camp Cherry Valley was decommissioned, as the Greater Los Angeles Area Council could not come to an agreement with the Catalina Island Conservancy to continue its lease. In 2026, the camp reopened with a restoration project by Pacific Treasure Foundation.

== Program ==
As of 2022, five main hikes are available for Scouts to take on Wednesday hike day:

- Emerald Bay: 4-mile hike to a sandy beach in a protected harbor, option of adding trip to goat whiskers summit to increase hike to 5 miles. Scouts hike in way and then take a 2-mile guided canoe or kayak the other way. Scouts have the opportunity to swim in the ocean during their time at the bay.33°27′57.46″N 118°31′35.69″W
- Parson's Landing: 7-mile hike to a sandy beach with a 2-mile canoe/kayak trip. 33°28′24.13″N 118°32′58.81″W
- Shark Harbor: 16-mile round-trip hike to a sandy beach with surf on the windward side of the island. Scouts have the chance to get in the water as well33°27′28″N 118°33′57″W
- Silver Peak: 21-mile hike to the highest point on the West end of Catalina. 33°27′28″N 118°33′57″W
- Little Fisherman's: A 4-mile hike up to Goat Whiskers, 33.452147°N 118.522139°W the mountain at the top of Cherry Cove, then down to Little Fisherman's beach.

Scouts have the opportunity to participate in an Advanced Camper Experience (ACE) while at camp. This program is for Adults and Scouts 14 and up. This program takes place during the week. The program has a morning portion which usually includes a kayak and a snorkel. They go to places like pirates cove and Guerrilla rock. The afternoon portion scouts get the chance to go paddle boarding, sailing or snorkeling. Scouts can take part in the ACE hike which is a hike to shark harbor or silver peak. Scouts can participate in all, or some of the ace activities. Scouts who participate in all activities and the hike can earn the ACE patch. Scouts can earn the BSA snorkel patch as well. The programs activities are staff and weather permitting.

== History ==
There is a small silver mine located in the cove left from the time the western part of Catalina Island was full of such mines. The mine was shut down by orders from Abraham Lincoln, after he had got rumors the Confederate army may attack California to acquire gold and silver to fund their war efforts. In 1864 Union Troops were put on the island to stop mining.

The San Gabriel Valley Council (former Pasadena Council) opened and operated the camp starting in 1923. Throughout the 1920s-1930s, Scouts would travel via train from Pasadena to San Pedro, then take The Great White Steamer (SS Catalina) to Avalon. After arriving in Avalon, they would then travel up to Cherry Cove on the Betty-O, a Wrigley tour boat, now a Marina del Rey fishing boat.

When Cherry Valley opened in 1923, it was very primitive that first year. There was no pier, so campers had to wade ashore or be shuttled from the Betty-O via rowboats. Scouts ate at an "open air" Dining Hall and were plagued by yellow jackets. Beginning in 1947, Scouts traveled directly from San Pedro to Cherry Cove on the H-10 water taxi. They would continue to travel via water taxi until 1973.

Cherry Valley was used by the Maritime Unit of the Office of Strategic Services (OSS) during World War II to train frogmen in amphibious operations who were then deployed into the Pacific Theatre of Operations, as an annex to their primary Catalina base at Toyon Bay.

The original 1937 lighthouse was blown down in a storm in 1998. It was rebuilt in 2003 and christened "Thomson's Light" in honor of Dr. Henry H. Thomson, who first supported Camp Cherry Valley as a medical student in 1932. He is a Silver Beaver and Silver Antelope recipient. For decades, Doc Thomson supported the health lodge with summer staffing and supplies.

The 1935 film Mutiny on the Bounty used the Cherry Cove as part of its filming.
