= Jack Hendrick Taylor =

American military operative (1908–1959)

- Born: October 9, 1908; Manhattan, Kansas
- Died: May 1959 (aged 50); El Centro, California
- Military career
- Allegiance: United States
- Branch: United States Navy, Office of Strategic Services
- Service years: 1941–1945; 1946
- Rank: Lieutenant commander
- Awards: Purple heart, etc.: Navy Cross

Jack Hendrick Taylor (October 9, 1908 – May 1959) was a United States Navy officer, OSS operative and Nazi concentration camp survivor.

== Early life ==
Taylor was born in Kansas. He moved to Hollywood at age 13 with his mother, father and younger sister, where his father operated an orthodontic clinic. An avid yachtsman and swimmer, Taylor was also a licensed pilot.

== Military service ==
After the Imperial Japanese Navy attacked Pearl Harbor Taylor enlisted in the US Navy and was assigned to a submarine chaser. Taylor, who had met William J. Donovan briefly before the war, was then recruited to join the OSS, the United States' wartime intelligence agency established in 1942. He was one of the first to join the organization's newly formed Maritime Unit, a precursor to the Navy SEALS. For this reason, Taylor is sometimes informally referred to as the "first Navy SEAL".

Taylor initially served as chief instructor at the Maritime Unit's secret Smith Point training camp in Maryland. In November 1942, Taylor helped inventor Christian J. Lambertsen demonstrate his secret Lambertsen Amphibious Respiratory Unit for OSS officer Commander H. G. A. Woolley. The invention would eventually allow the Maritime Unit to undertake clandestine diving missions in support of the Allied forces.

In summer 1943, Taylor was deployed to Cairo to gather watercraft for the unit's upcoming missions in the Aegean Sea. Taylor was active before the Battle of Leros, dodging German troops and carrying supplies to MI6 operatives. He often collaborated with American film actor Sterling Hayden, who worked for the OSS Special Operations branch. In September 1943, Taylor was appointed OSS Operations Officer in Italy, where he set up a Maritime Unit branch in the city of Bari to supply Josip Broz Tito's Yugoslav Partisans, a guerilla force fighting against Nazi Germany in occupied Yugoslavia. After the December 1943 air raid on Bari, Taylor relocated the OSS base of operations to Monopoli. Taylor personally led many of the Maritime Unit's covert missions, including one into Albania to rescue a flight of American nurses and medics who had been forced down in the Ceraunian Mountains. On a later trip, Taylor and his men were trapped in Albania for three months, sneaking back into Italy in July 1944 with letters from Albanian nationalist Abaz Kupi.

== Capture and internment ==
In October 1944, Taylor parachuted into Austria with three OSS operatives to spy on German supply lines around the city of Wiener Neustadt. However, they caught the attention of Gestapo agents and were arrested and sent to the Morzinplatz Gestapo headquarters in Vienna. In March 1945, Taylor was transferred to the Mauthausen-Gusen concentration camp complex in northern Austria. He was one of the few American inmates in the camp and collected intelligence from fellow inmates regarding the atrocities committed in the camp. Taylor was also part of the slave labor force that built the crematorium used to exterminate the concentration camp prisoners. Suffering from dysentery and starvation, Taylor was scheduled to be executed four times, but was saved by fellow inmates who wanted him to survive to report on the camp conditions. Taylor was spared from execution a fifth time when part of the 11th Armored Division liberated the camp on May 5, 1945. He was interviewed inside the camp as part of the Nazi Concentration Camps film in 1945 by film director George Stevens. Taylor spent his remaining time in Austria collecting documents and interviewing witnesses to gather evidence against the camp commanders and guards.

== Post-military career ==
After being honorably discharged in autumn 1945, Taylor returned to civilian life in California. He was briefly reactivated in 1946 to serve as one of the primary witnesses in United States of America vs. Hans Altfuldisch et al.. During the trial, he detailed many of the atrocities committed by Waffen-SS members at the Mauthausen-Gusen concentration camp complex, based on the evidence he had helped to gather.

According to biographer Patrick O'Donnell, Taylor suffered from symptoms contingent with posttraumatic stress disorder later in his life.

He died in the crash of a private light plane that he was piloting in the vicinity of Imperial County, California, not far from his residence, on 10 May 1959. His OSS files were not declassified until after his death.
