= Omni Shoreham Hotel =

Hotel in Northwest Washington, D.C.

Coordinates: 38°55′21″N 77°3′12.6″W

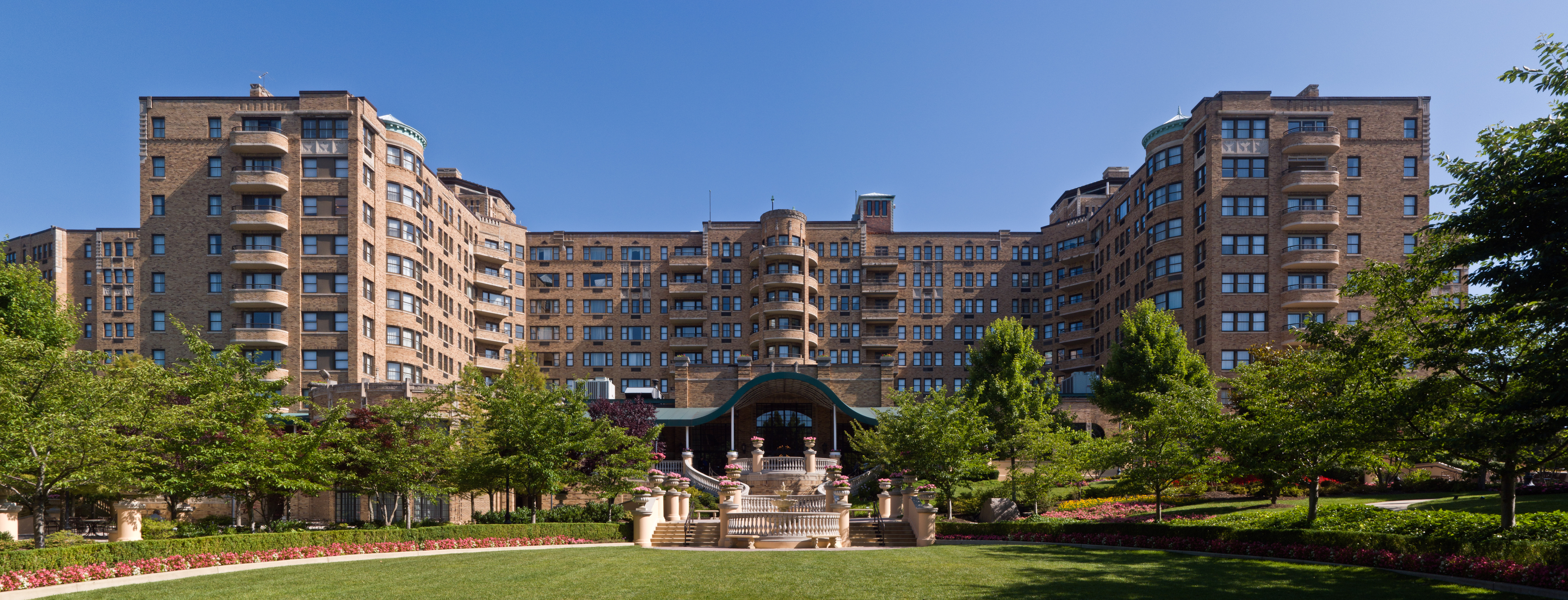
Omni Shoreham Hotel

The Omni Shoreham Hotel is a historic resort and convention hotel in Northwest Washington, D.C., built in 1930 and owned by Omni Hotels. It is located one block west of the intersection of Connecticut Avenue and Calvert Street. The hotel is known for having been a regular venue for Mark Russell and the Capitol Steps. It is a member of Historic Hotels of America, the official program of the National Trust for Historic Preservation.

== History ==
=== First Shoreham Hotel ===
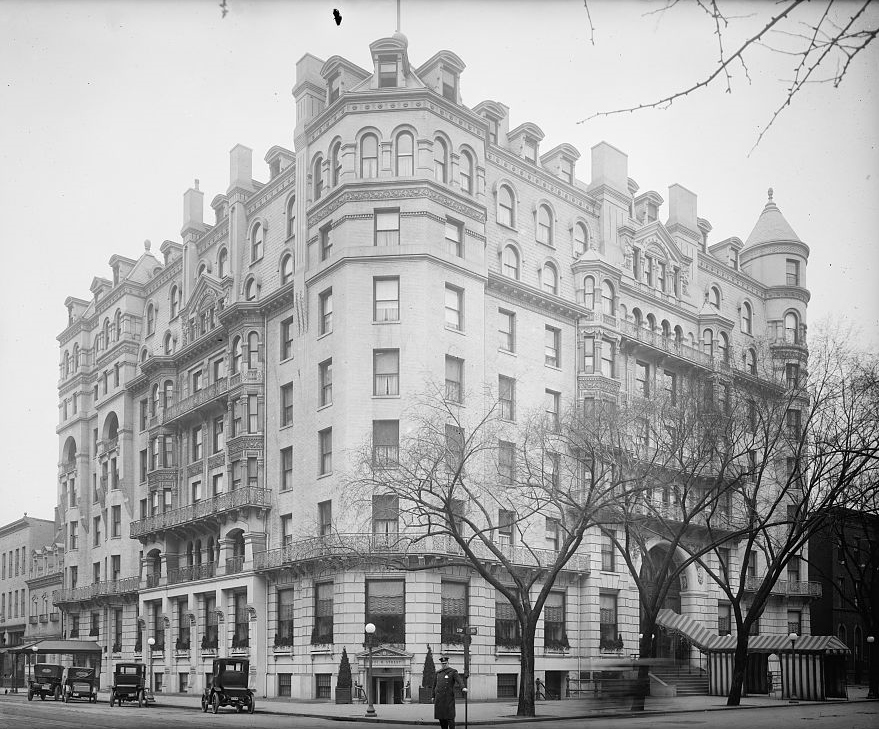
The first Shoreham Hotel, c. 1916

The first Shoreham Hotel was constructed in 1887 by Vice President of the United States Levi P. Morton. It was designed by the New York firm of Hubert, Pirrson & Company and was located at 15th and H Streets NW. Morton named the hotel for his birthplace, Shoreham, Vermont. The hotel was expanded in 1890 and extensively renovated in 1902 and 1913. The Shoreham went bankrupt in 1927 and was sold to developer Harry Wardman, who demolished the hotel in 1929 and replaced it with the Shoreham Office Building, designed by Mihran Mesrobian. That structure was itself converted to a hotel in 2002, becoming the Sofitel Washington DC Lafayette Square.

=== Second Shoreham Hotel ===
The modern Shoreham Hotel was constructed by developer Harry M. Bralove as a resort hotel, situated in the leafy Woodley Park neighborhood, well outside the heart of the city. The hotel was designed by Washington architect Joseph H. Abel. Construction began in 1929 and the hotel celebrated its grand opening on October 30, 1930, with a party attended by 5000 people. The enormously popular singer Rudy Vallée was booked to play the grand opening, but he had to fly down after a scheduled evening show at the Brooklyn Paramount Theater. Vallée's small plane encountered a storm after leaving Newark Airport, and was forced to touch down at Camden Central Airport. Vallée gave an impromptu concert there, as he and his band waited for the weather to clear. They finally reached Washington's Bolling Field at 3:15am and made their way to the Shoreham. They performed for the 1000 remaining guests from 4:15 to 4:30am, before leaving for Washington Union Station, to take a train back to New York for an 8am rehearsal.

On 4 March 1933, the first inaugural ball of President Franklin D. Roosevelt was held at the hotel. The hotel was outfitted with a special ramp and elevator to accommodate the needs of the new president, who used a wheelchair due to his physical disability. Subsequently, the Shoreham hosted inaugural balls for every president of the 20th Century. President Bill Clinton played the saxophone at his inaugural ball held at the hotel on 21 January 1993.

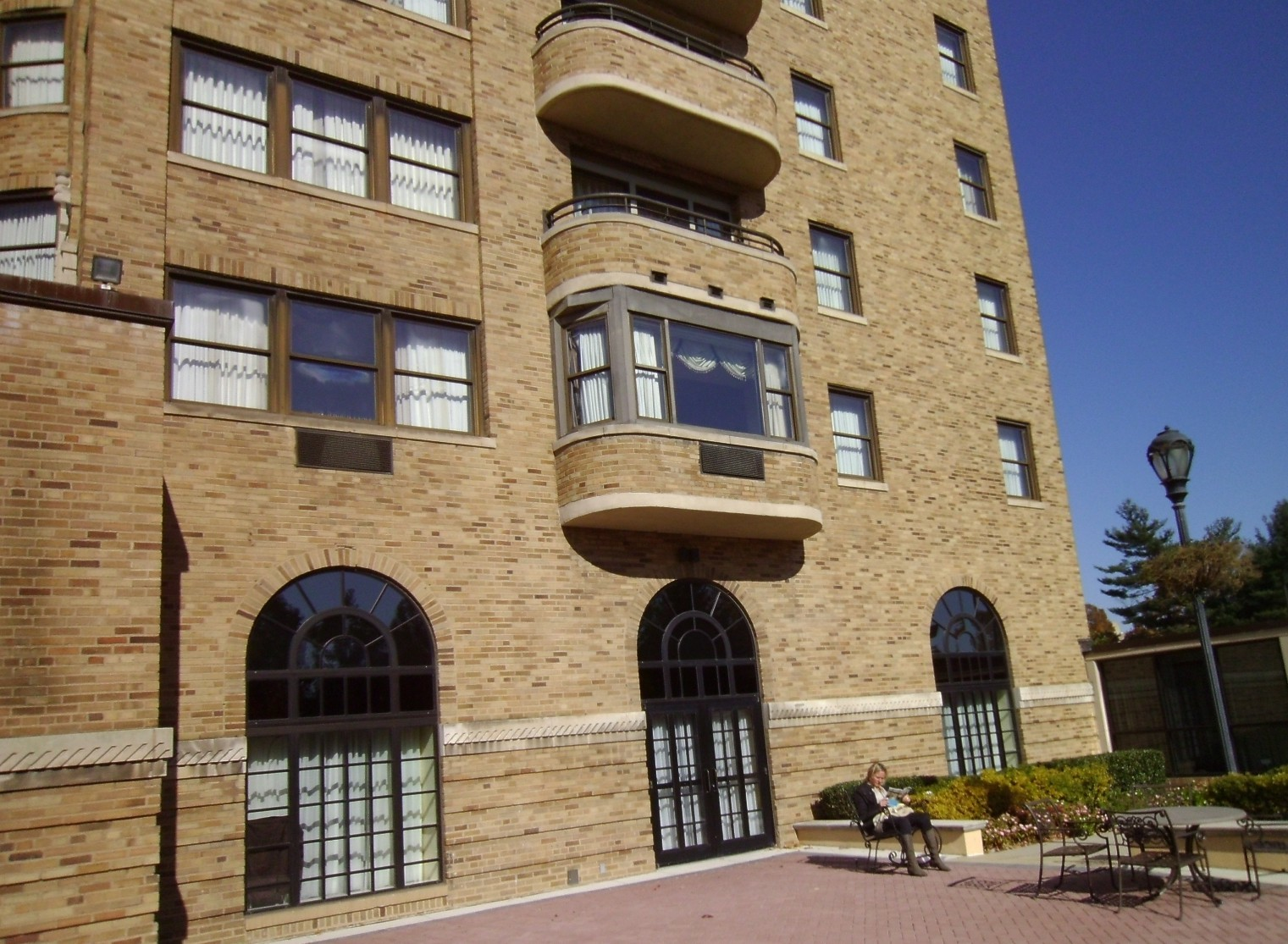
The glass-enclosed balcony of the Roosevelt Suite at the Shoreham Hotel, the 1942–1944 wartime home of Manuel L. Quezon

Philippine President Manuel L. Quezon had his official residence in the Shoreham Hotel, during the period the government-in-exile of the Commonwealth of the Philippines was established in Washington, D.C. from May 1942 until his death in August 1944. The third-floor suite (the Franklin D. Roosevelt suite) he and his family stayed in was fully enclosed, and the glassed-in balcony can still be seen to this day. During that time, the Philippine and American flags flew outside the hotel.

Dr. Chris Lambertsen demonstrated his Lambertsen Amphibious Respiratory Unit (LARU) MK II, an oxygen rebreather, to individuals who were in the process of forming a maritime unit for the Office of Strategic Services (OSS) in November 1942 at the Shoreham Hotel.

In 1944, Ed Heinemann of Douglas Aircraft designed the AD-1 Skyraider on the back of an envelope overnight at the Shoreham when he arrived in Washington to discover that the U.S. Navy had made last minute changes in their request for a replacement for the SBD Dauntless dive bomber.

The Shoreham was largely a residential hotel until 1950, when it began converting to house transient guests. Over the years, the Shoreham has been the Washington home of many prominent politicians, including Senator Stuart Symington from Missouri. During the late 1940s and early 1950s when he was first Secretary of the Air Force, Symington was known to host President Harry S. Truman for all-night poker games.

On February 10, 1964, the Beatles booked the entire 7th floor of the hotel for one evening while they were in Washington to give a concert at the Washington Coliseum during their first American tour. Later that year in December, Denny Doherty performed his first show with John Phillips and Michelle Phillips, as The New Journeymen. With the addition of Cass Elliot, they would go on to be known as The Mamas & the Papas. The Conservative Political Action Conference took place at the Omni from 2006 through 2009.

In 1973, the hotel was sold to Chicago real estate investor Lester Meilman's MAT Associates. They retained Americana Hotels, the hospitality division of American Airlines, to manage the hotel, which was renamed the Shoreham Americana Hotel. In 1980, Dunfey Hotels, the hospitality division of Aer Lingus, purchased the hotel in partnership with New York developer William Zeckendorf Jr. Dunfey assumed management in January 1980 and renamed the hotel The Shoreham, a Dunfey Hotel. In 1983, Dunfey Hotels acquired Omni International Hotels, forming a new chain, Omni Hotels & Resorts. The hotel was renamed the Omni Shoreham Hotel in 1985.

The Shoreham was featured in the 1987 film No Way Out, when the character played by Kevin Costner, Commander Tom Farrell, first meets the character Susan Atwell played by Sean Young at an presidential inaugural ball. In the 2003 film Shattered Glass about the journalism scandal at The New Republic perpetrated by Stephen Glass, the hotel is mentioned by name and a fictional version is depicted, as Glass claims to have attended a conference of Young Republicans held there.

== Alleged haunting ==
The hotel's owners accepted Henry L. Doherty as a minority financial partner. Doherty and his family moved into an apartment (now Suite 870) in the hotel, along with their maid, Juliette Brown. A few months after the Dohertys moved into the apartment, their maid died in the night. Dohertys' daughter Helen lived to be over 50 years old and died in Denmark. She did not die in the suite. The Dohertys moved out, and the apartment remained unoccupied for almost 50 years. The apartment was renovated into a hotel suite. But guests and hotel staff began to tell stories of faint voices, cold breezes, doors slamming shut and opening of their own accord, and televisions and lights turning on and off on their own. Guests in adjoining suites would complain of noises coming from the closed and empty Suite 870. Other occupants say furniture would be found out of place, and hotel staff said their housekeeping carts would move on their own. The Omni Shoreham Hotel has named the room the "Ghost Suite". Todd Scartozzi, an Omni Hotels manager, stayed in the Ghost Suite with his family and observed a walk-in closet light turning off and on of its own accord.

== Rating ==
The AAA gave the hotel four diamonds out of five in 2001. The hotel has maintained that rating every year, and received four diamonds again for 2016. Forbes Travel Guide (formerly known as Mobil Guide) declined to give the hotel either four or five stars in 2016, and did not put it on its list of "recommended" hotels.

In March 2017, Cvent, an event management company, ranked the Omni Shoreham 79th in its annual list of the top U.S. hotels for meetings.
