= OSS Maritime Unit =

Former United States military branch

Maritime Unit
- OSS insignia

Agency overview
- Formed: June 10, 1942
- Dissolved: September 20, 1945
- Superseding agencies: US Navy SEALS; Special Forces Underwater Operations; Special Activities Center
- Parent department: Office of Strategic Services

The Maritime Unit (MU) was a branch of the Office of Strategic Services (OSS) that enabled maritime warfare for the allies during World War II.

MU's mission was to "infiltrate agents and supply resistance groups by sea, conduct maritime sabotage, and to develop specialized maritime surface and subsurface equipment and devices". MU developed specialized boats, equipment, and explosives, fashioned underwater breathing gear, waterproof watches and compasses, an inflatable motorized surfboard, and "a two-man kayak that proved so promising that 275 were ordered by the British".

MU was originally established as a division of the Special Operations Branch (SO) of the OSS but was granted Branch status on June 10, 1942.

The Commando Frogmen of the MU are considered pioneers of amphibious warfare, maritime special operations, and underwater warfare. While it was a civilian agency, the United States Navy SEALs state clearly that the OSS Maritime Unit is one of their direct preceding organizations.

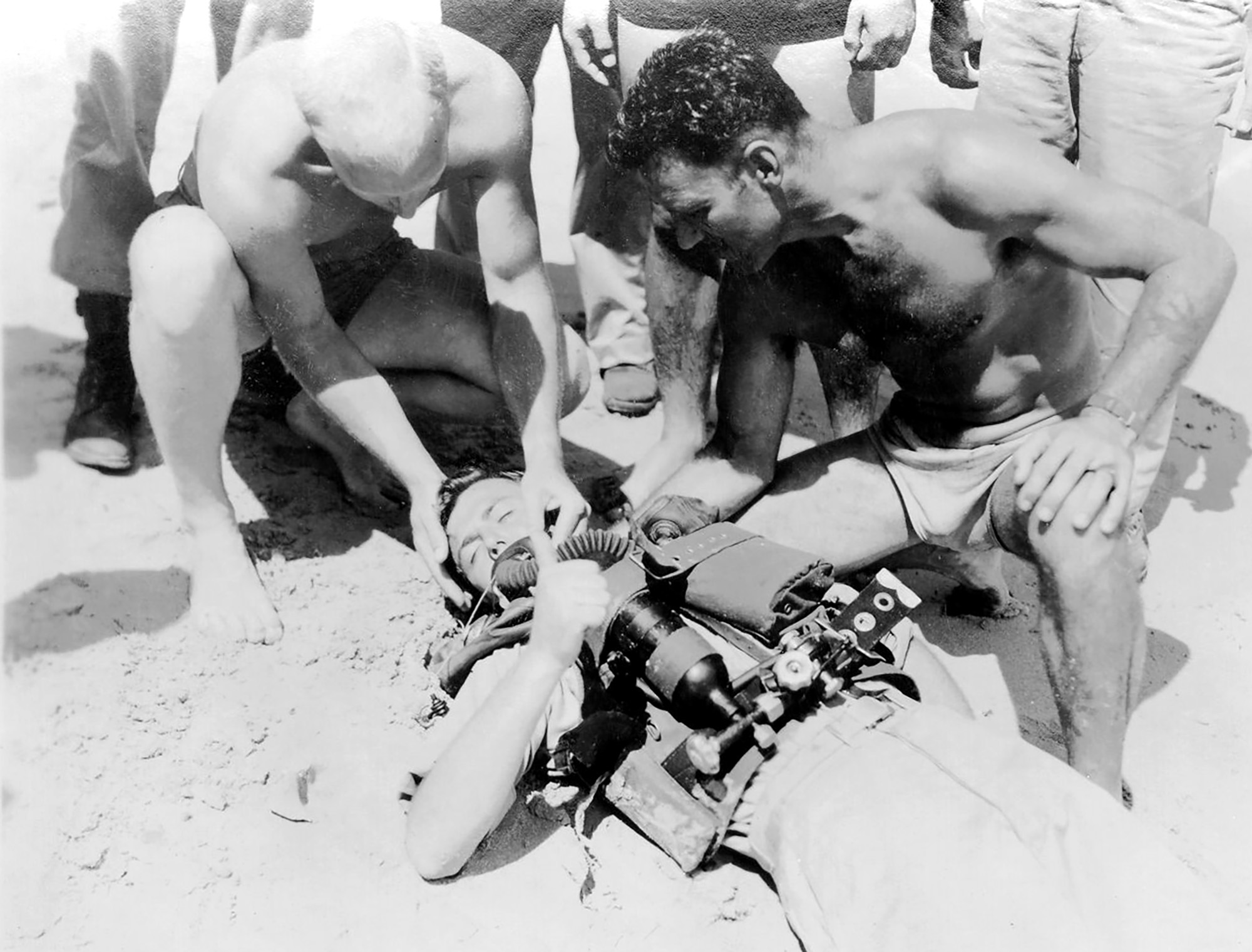
Underwater combat swimmer of the Office of Strategic Services Detachment 404 Maritime Unit

MU planned and carried out the amphibious phases of OSS activities and assisted in the development of the special equipment required. If operations included water, the shoreline, coastal areas, or water approaches, then MU techniques were used.

Those techniques were amphibious reconnaissance, clandestine ferrying, maritime sabotage, and underwater demolition.

The last living Commando Frogman of the OSS was Henry “Hank” Weldon.

== Organizational structure ==
Field bases were located away from headquarters.

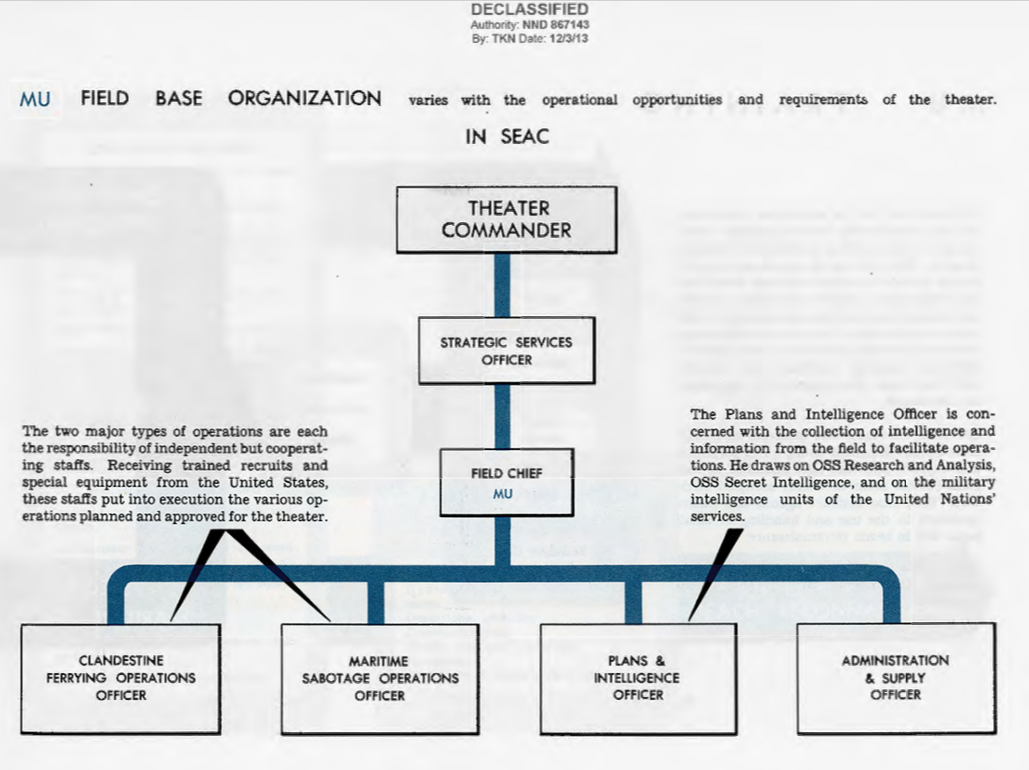

Headquarters was located in Washington, DC.

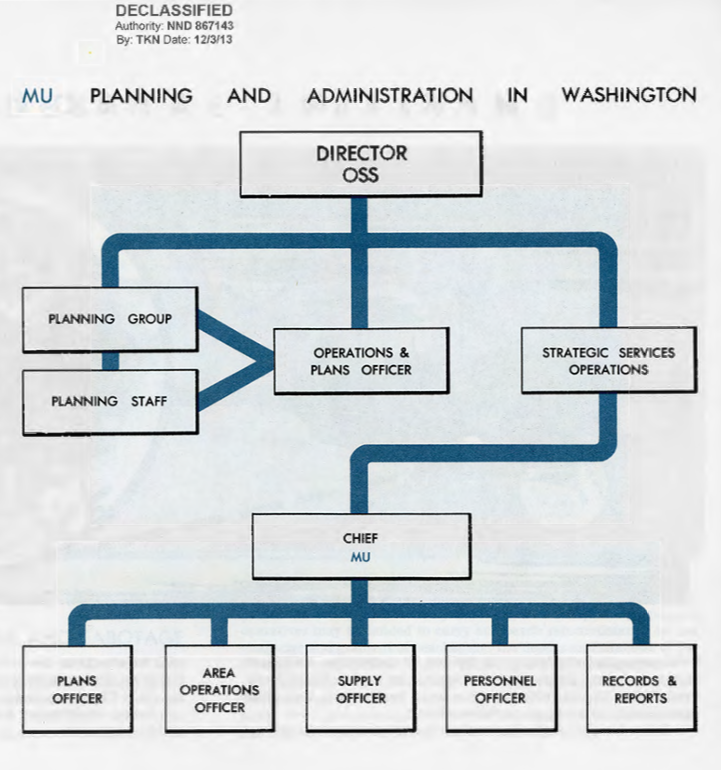

== Inventions ==
The Lambertsen Amphibious Respiratory Unit (LARU) was developed by Christian J. Lambertsen, a captain in the US Army assigned to the MU.
