= Office of Strategic Services =

1942–1945 US intelligence agency

- OSS insignia

Agency overview
- Formed: June 13, 1942; 84 years ago
- Preceding agency: Coordinator of Information
- Dissolved: October 1, 1945; 81 years ago
- Superseding agencies: Central Intelligence Agency; Bureau of Intelligence and Research (INR) (Department of State); Central Intelligence Group (1946-1947); Strategic Services Unit (1945-1946); U.S. Army Special Forces
- Employees: 13,000 estimated
- Agency executives: William J. Donovan, Director of Strategic Services; G. Edward Buxton Jr., Assistant Director of Strategic Services; Millard Preston Goodfellow, Deputy Director of Special Operations; David K. E. Bruce, Chief of OSS/Europe; Garland H. Williams, Deputy Director of Training and Facilities; John Magruder, Deputy Director of Secret Intelligence; Stanley Platt Lovell, Deputy Director of Research and Development Branch; James R. Murphy, (SAINT) Chief of X-2 Counterintelligence Branch

Overview: Office of Strategic Services
CIA film describing OSS recruitment, training, and missions during WWII

The Office of Strategic Services (OSS) was the second non-departmental civilian intelligence agency of the United States. It was formed during World War II as the direct successor of the Office of the Coordinator of Information (COI). The OSS was created as an agency of the Joint Chiefs of Staff (JCS) to coordinate espionage activities behind enemy lines for all branches of the United States Armed Forces. Other OSS functions included the use of propaganda, subversion, and post-war planning.

The OSS was dissolved a month after the end of the war. Intelligence tasks were soon resumed and carried over by its successors, the Strategic Services Unit (SSU), the Department of State's Bureau of Intelligence and Research (INR), the Central Intelligence Group (CIG), the intermediary precursor to the independent Central Intelligence Agency (CIA), and the United States Army Special Forces, colloquially known as the "Green Berets".

In December 2016, the organization was collectively honored with a Congressional Gold Medal.

== Origin ==
Before the OSS, the various departments of the executive branch, including the State, Treasury, Navy, and War Departments, conducted American intelligence activities on an ad hoc basis, with no overall direction, coordination, or control. The US Army and US Navy had separate code-breaking departments: Signal Intelligence Service and OP-20-G. (A previous code-breaking operation of the State Department, the MI-8, run by Herbert Yardley, had been shut down in 1929 by Secretary of State Henry Stimson, deeming it an inappropriate function for the diplomatic arm, because "gentlemen don't read each other's mail.") The FBI was responsible for domestic security and anti-espionage operations.

President Franklin D. Roosevelt was concerned about American intelligence deficiencies. On the suggestion of William "Little Bill" Stephenson, the senior British intelligence officer in the western hemisphere, Roosevelt requested that William "Wild Bill" Donovan draft a plan for an intelligence service based on the British Secret Intelligence Service (MI6) and Special Operations Executive (SOE). Donovan envisioned a single agency responsible for foreign intelligence and special operations involving commandos, disinformation, partisan and guerrilla activities. Donovan worked closely with Australian-born British intelligence officer Charles Howard 'Dick' Ellis, who has been credited with writing the blueprint.

Said Ellis:

I was soon requested to draft a blueprint for an American intelligence agency, the equivalent of BSC [British Security Co-ordination] and based on these British wartime improvisations... detailed tables of organisation were disclosed to Washington... among these were the organisational tables that led to the birth of General William Donovan's OSS.

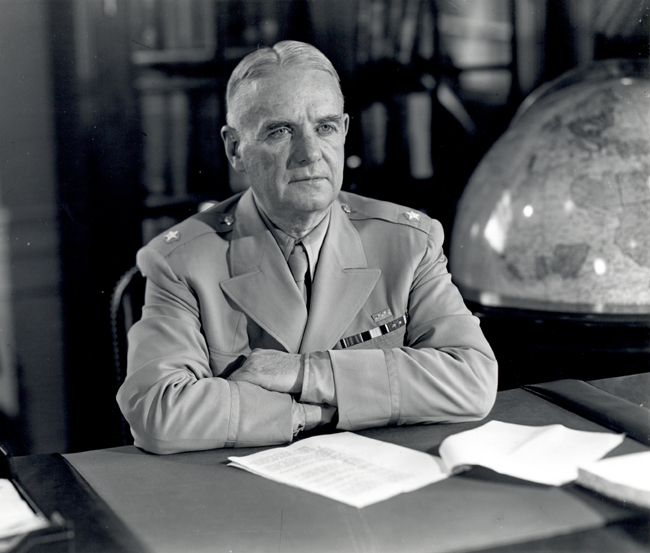
William J. Donovan

After submitting his (and Ellis's) work, "Memorandum of Establishment of Service of Strategic Information", Donovan was appointed "Coordinator of Information" on July 11, 1941, heading the new organization known as the Office of the Coordinator of Information (COI).

Ellis, described as Donovan's "right-hand man", "effectively ran the organization".

Writes Fink:

Ellis was sent from New York by William Stephenson "to Washington to open a sub-station to facilitate daily liaison with Donovan, who reciprocated by sending [future Director of Central Intelligence, DCI] Allen Welsh Dulles to liaise with BSC in the Rockefeller Center". According to Thomas F. Troy, paraphrasing Stephenson, Ellis 'was the tradecraft expert, the organization man, the one who furnished Bill Donovan with charts and memoranda on running an intelligence organization".

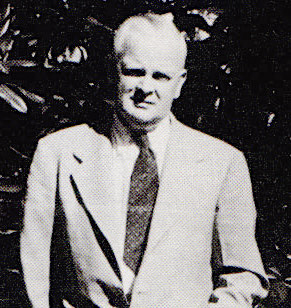
Dick Ellis

Donovan had responsibilities but no actual powers and the existing US agencies were skeptical if not hostile to the British. Until some months after Pearl Harbor, the bulk of OSS intelligence came from the UK. British Security Co-ordination (BSC), under the direction of Ellis, trained the first OSS agents in Canada, until training stations were set up in the US with guidance from BSC instructors, who also provided information on how the SOE was arranged and managed. The British immediately made available their short-wave broadcasting capabilities to Europe, Africa, and the Far East and provided equipment for agents until American production was established.

Writes Fink:

William Casey, who headed up OSS's Europe-based human-intelligence operations, the Secret Intelligence Branch, and went on to become director of the CIA, wrote in his autobiography, The Secret War Against Hitler, that Ellis was not only writing blueprints but involved in on-the-ground, logistical programs: "Dick Ellis, [an] experienced British pro, helped establish training centres, mostly around Washington." United States Assistant Secretary of State Adolf Berle commented: "The really active head of the intelligence section in [William] Donovan's [OSS] group is [Ellis] ... in other words, [Stephenson's] assistant in the British intelligence [sic] is running Donovan's intelligence service."

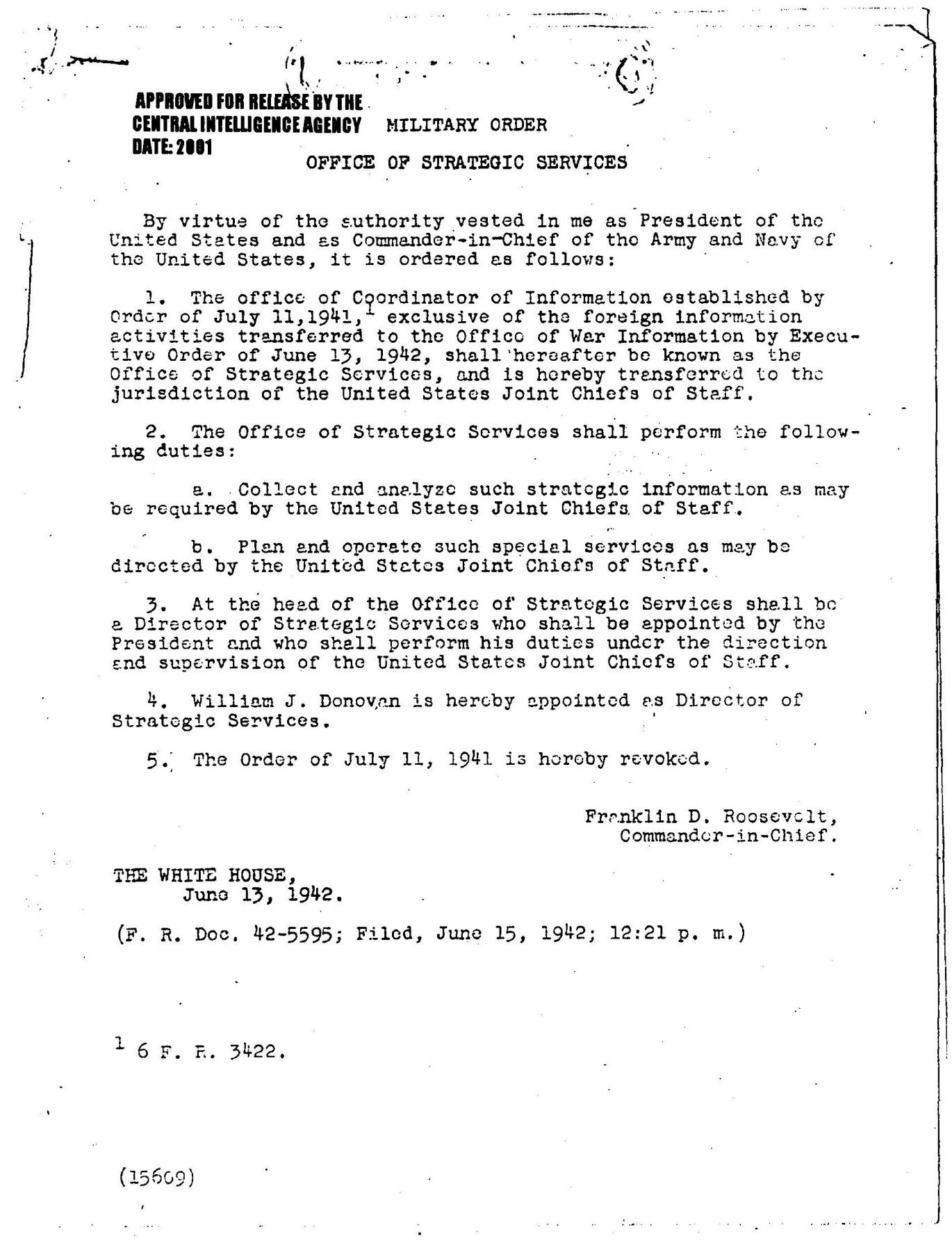
President Roosevelt ordered the creation of the Office of Strategic Services on June 13, 1942

The Office of Strategic Services was established by a Presidential military order issued by President Roosevelt on June 13, 1942, to collect and analyze strategic information required by the Joint Chiefs of Staff and to conduct special operations not assigned to other agencies. During the war, the OSS supplied policymakers with facts and estimates, but the OSS never had jurisdiction over all foreign intelligence activities. The Special Intelligence Service (SIS) of the FBI was left responsible for intelligence work in Latin America, and the Army and Navy continued to develop and rely on their own sources of intelligence.

Donald Downes, who was developing counterintelligence capabilities in Washington, explained the situation in his memoir:

Edgar Hoover was out for Donovan's scalp and any type of co-operation was pretty well one-sided. Not only OSS, but the British Secret Intelligence, many of whose investigations were bound to lead to America, were constantly being hounded by the FBI... A friend of ours in the Department of Justice had warned us that Edgar Hoover believed we were 'penetrating' embassies and that he was annoyed.

== Activities ==
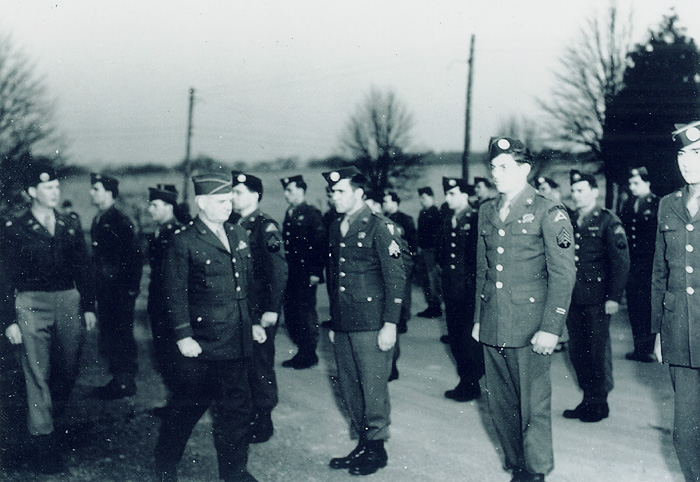
General William J. Donovan reviews Operational Group members in Bethesda, Maryland, prior to their departure for China in 1945.

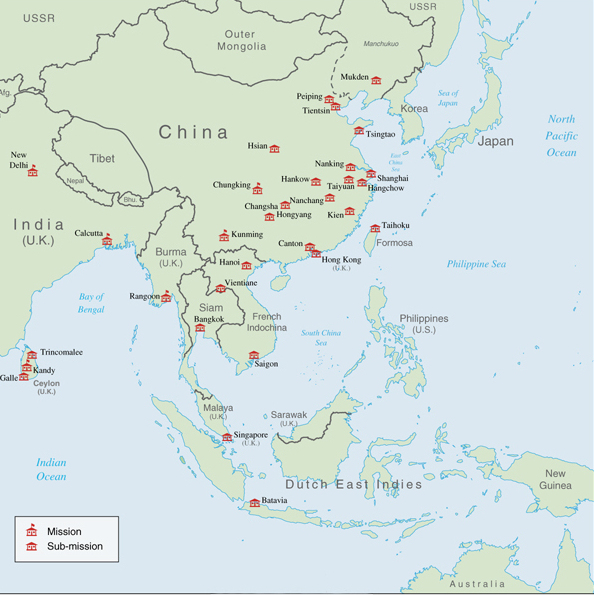
OSS missions and bases in East Asia

OSS proved especially useful in providing a worldwide overview of the German war effort, its strengths and weaknesses. In direct operations it was successful in supporting Operation Torch in French North Africa in 1942, where it identified pro-Allied potential supporters and located landing sites. OSS operations in neutral countries, especially Stockholm, Sweden, provided in-depth information on German advanced technology. The Madrid station set up agent networks in France that supported the Allied invasion of southern France in 1944. Most famous were the operations in Switzerland run by Allen Dulles that provided extensive information on German strength, air defenses, submarine production, and the V-1 and V-2 weapons. It revealed some of the secret German efforts in chemical and biological warfare. Switzerland's station also supported resistance fighters in France, Austria and Italy, and helped with the surrender of German forces in Italy in 1945.

For the duration of World War II, the Office of Strategic Services was conducting multiple activities and missions, including collecting intelligence by spying, performing acts of sabotage, waging propaganda war, organizing and coordinating anti-Nazi resistance groups in Europe, and providing military training for anti-Japanese guerrilla movements in Asia, among other things. At the height of its influence during World War II, the OSS employed almost 24,000 people.

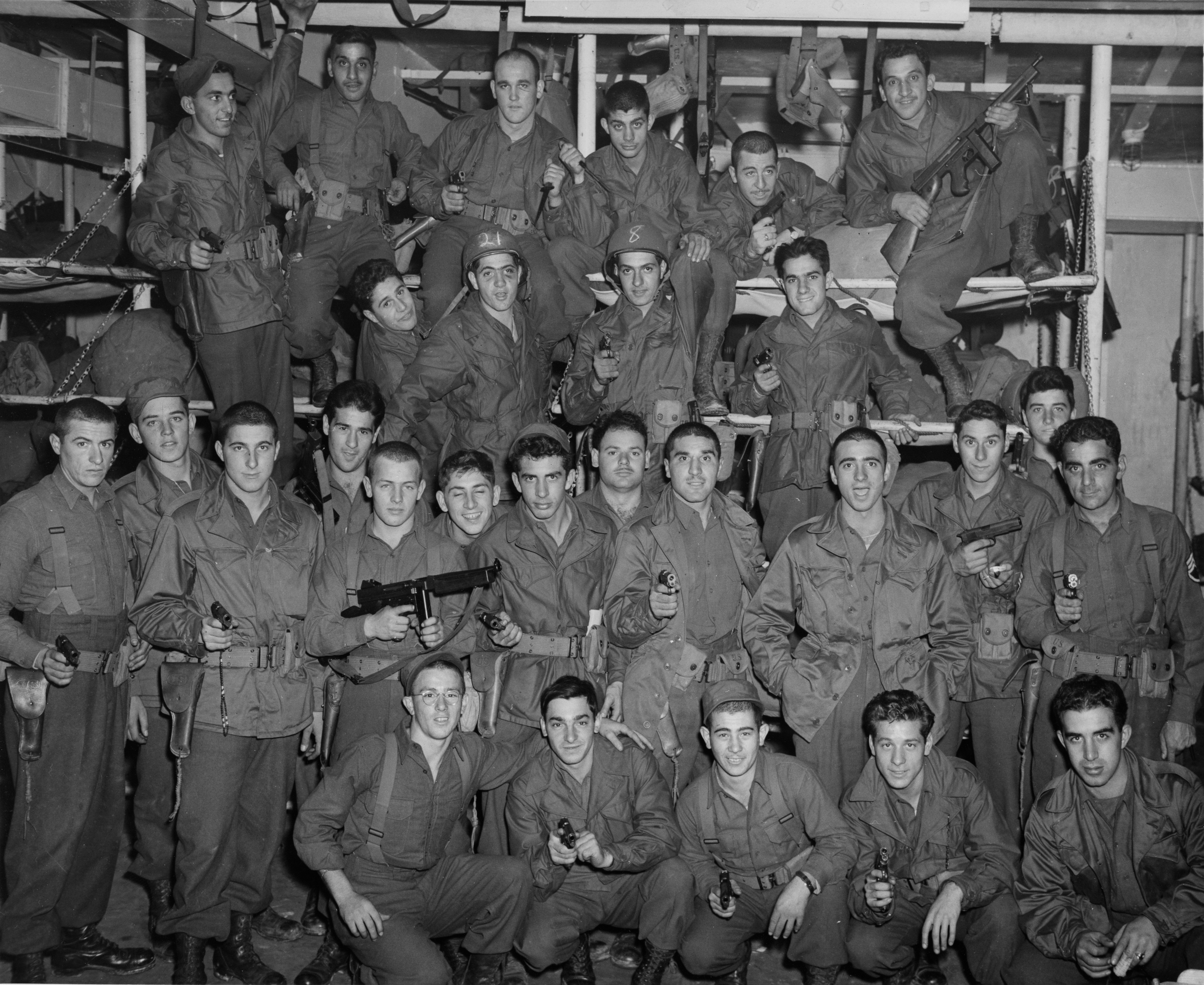
Men trained for ranger and guerrilla fighting by the OSS, January 1944

From 1943 to 1945, the OSS played a major role in training Kuomintang troops in China and British Burma, and recruited Kachin and other indigenous irregular forces for sabotage as well as guides for Allied forces in Burma fighting the Japanese Army. Among other activities, the OSS helped arm, train, and supply resistance movements in areas militarily occupied by the Japanese Empire during World War II, including Mao Zedong's Red Army in China (known as the Dixie Mission), Ho Chi Minh's Viet Minh in French Indochina in which OSS officer Archimedes Patti played a central role in OSS operations in Indochina and met frequently with Ho Chi Minh in 1945 as well as Korean Liberation Army partisans on the Korean Peninsula (known as the Eagle Project).

One of the greatest accomplishments of the OSS during World War II was its penetration of Nazi Germany by OSS operatives. The OSS was responsible for training German and Austrian individuals for missions inside Germany. Some of these agents included exiled communists and Socialist party members, labor activists, anti-Nazi prisoners-of-war, and German and Jewish refugees. The OSS also recruited and ran one of the war's most important spies, the German diplomat Fritz Kolbe.

From 1943 the OSS was in contact with the Austrian resistance group around Kaplan Heinrich Maier. As a result, plans and production facilities for V-2 rockets, Tiger tanks and aircraft (Messerschmitt Bf 109, Messerschmitt Me 163 Komet, etc.) were passed on to Allied general staffs in order to enable Allied bombers to get accurate air strikes. The Maier group informed very early about the mass murder of Jews through its contacts with the Semperit factory near Auschwitz. The group was gradually dismantled by the German authorities because of a double agent who worked for both the OSS and the Gestapo. This uncovered a transfer of money from the Americans to Vienna via Istanbul and Budapest, and most of the members were executed after a People's Court hearing.

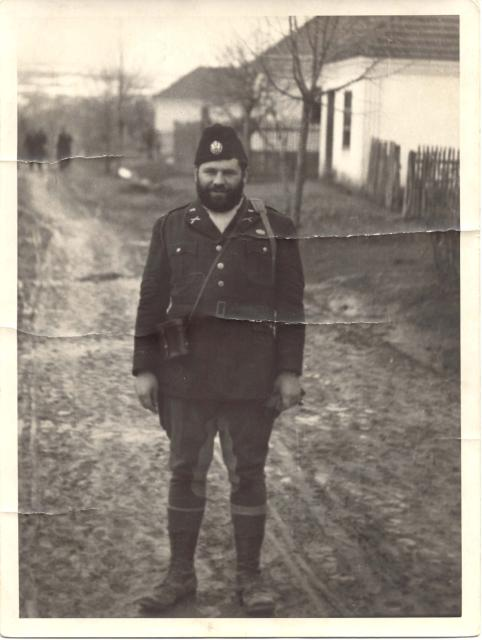
OSS 1st Lieutenant George Musulin behind enemy lines in German-occupied Serbia, as a Chetnik, during his first mission in November 1943. His second mission was Operation Halyard.

In 1943, the Office of Strategic Services set up operations in Istanbul. Turkey, as a neutral country during the Second World War, was a place where both the Axis and Allied powers had spy networks. The railroads connecting central Asia with Europe, as well as Turkey's close proximity to the Balkan states, placed it at a crossroads of intelligence gathering. The goal of the OSS Istanbul operation called Project Net-1 was to infiltrate and extenuate subversive action in the old Ottoman and Austro-Hungarian Empires.

The head of operations at OSS Istanbul was a banker from Chicago named Lanning "Packy" Macfarland, who maintained a cover story as a banker for the American lend-lease program. Macfarland hired Alfred Schwarz, an Austrian businessman (* 25. April 1904 in Prostějov, Austria-Hungary; † 13. August 1988 in Lucerne, Switzerland) who came to be known as "Dogwood" and ended up establishing the Dogwood information chain. Dogwood in turn hired a personal assistant named Walter Arndt and established himself as an employee of the Istanbul Western Electrik Kompani. Through Schwarz and Arndt the OSS was able to infiltrate anti-fascist groups in Austria, Hungary, and Germany. Schwarz was able to convince Romanian, Bulgarian, Hungarian, and Swiss diplomatic couriers to smuggle American intelligence information into these territories and establish contact with elements antagonistic to the Nazis and their collaborators. Couriers and agents memorized information and produced analytical reports; when they were not able to memorize effectively they recorded information on microfilm and hid it in their shoes or hollowed pencils. Through this process information about the Nazi regime made its way to Macfarland and the OSS in Istanbul and eventually to Washington.

While the OSS "Dogwood-chain" produced a lot of information, its reliability was increasingly questioned by British intelligence. By May 1944, through collaboration between the OSS, British intelligence, Cairo, and Washington, the entire Dogwood-chain was found to be unreliable and dangerous. Planting phony information into the OSS was intended to misdirect the resources of the Allies. Schwarz's Dogwood-chain, which was the largest American intelligence gathering tool in occupied territory, was shortly thereafter shut down.

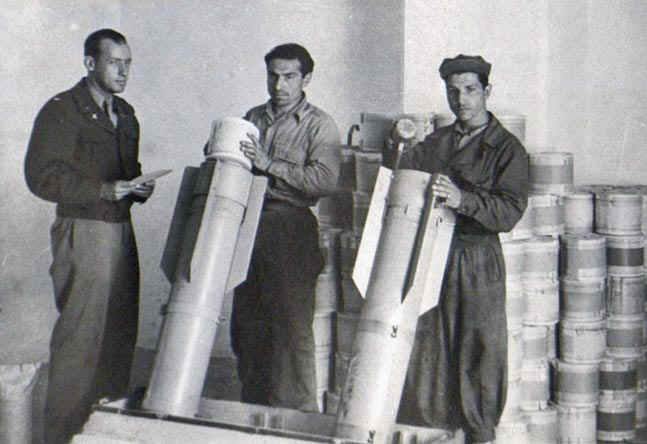
Packing of miniature issues of the magazine by OSS members in "bombs" as part of Operation Pig Iron

The OSS purchased Soviet code and cipher material (or Finnish information on them) from émigré Finnish army officers in late 1944. Secretary of State Edward Stettinius, Jr., protested that this violated an agreement President Roosevelt made with the Soviet Union not to interfere with Soviet cipher traffic from the United States. General Donovan might have copied the papers before returning them the following January, but there is no record of Arlington Hall receiving them, and CIA and NSA archives have no surviving copies. This codebook was in fact used as part of the Venona decryption effort, which helped uncover large-scale Soviet espionage in North America.

RYPE was the codename of the airborne unit who was dropped in the Norwegian mountains of Snåsa on March 24, 1945, to carry out sabotage actions behind enemy lines. From the base at the Gjefsjøen mountain farm, the group conducted successful railroad sabotages, with the intention of preventing the withdrawal of German forces from northern Norway. Operasjon Rype was the only U.S. operation on German-occupied Norwegian soil during WW2. The group consisted mainly of Norwegian Americans recruited from the 99th Infantry Battalion. Operasjon Rype was led by William Colby.

The OSS sent four teams of two under Captain Stephen Vinciguerra (codename Algonquin, teams Alsace, Poissy, S&S and Student), with Operation Varsity in March 1945 to infiltrate and report from behind enemy lines, but none succeeded. Team S&S had two agents in Wehrmacht uniforms and a captured Kϋbelwagen; to report by radio. But the Kϋbelwagen was put out of action while in the glider; three tires and the long-range radio were shot up (German gunners were told to attack the gliders not the tow planes).

Despite the successes, the OSS was often criticized for reckless operations that unnecessarily put lives in danger. One such example was in Sicily in 1942, when an SO (Special Operations) Chief under Donovan's command accidentally led a radio operator with knowledge of the Ultra system into a minefield, nearly leading him to capture had he not killed the German officer guarding him and escaped. Had he been captured and interrogated, the entire Allied codebreaking apparatus would have been put in jeopardy. This particular instance portrayed a wider issue of OSS operations being careless by putting larger operations at risk for little reward.

== Weapons and gadgets ==
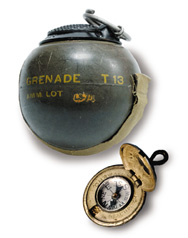
OSS T13 Beano Grenade and compass hidden in a button, CIA Museum

The OSS espionage and sabotage operations produced a steady demand for highly specialized equipment. General Donovan invited experts, organized workshops, and funded labs that later formed the core of the Research & Development Branch. Boston chemist Stanley P. Lovell became its first head, and Donovan humorously called him his "Professor Moriarty". Throughout the war years, the OSS Research & Development successfully adapted Allied weapons and espionage equipment, and produced its own line of novel spy tools and gadgets, including silenced pistols, lightweight sub-machine guns, "Beano" grenades that exploded upon impact, explosives disguised as lumps of coal ("Black Joe") or bags of Chinese flour ("Aunt Jemima"), acetone time delay fuses for limpet mines, compasses hidden in uniform buttons, playing cards that concealed maps, a 16mm Kodak camera in the shape of a matchbox, tasteless poison tablets ("K" and "L" pills), and cigarettes laced with tetrahydrocannabinol acetate (an extract of Indian hemp) to induce uncontrollable chattiness.

The OSS also developed innovative communication equipment such as wiretap gadgets, electronic beacons for locating agents, and the "Joan-Eleanor" portable radio system that made it possible for operatives on the ground to establish secure contact with a plane that was preparing to land or drop cargo. The OSS Research & Development also printed fake German and Japanese-issued identification cards, and various passes, ration cards, and counterfeit money.

On August 28, 1943, Stanley Lovell was asked to make a presentation in front of a hostile Joint Chiefs of Staff, who were skeptical of OSS plans beyond collecting military intelligence and were ready to split the OSS between the Army and the Navy. While explaining the purpose and mission of his department and introducing various gadgets and tools, he reportedly casually dropped into a waste basket a Hedy, a panic-inducing explosive device in the shape of a firecracker, which shortly produced a loud shrieking sound followed by a deafening boom. The presentation was interrupted and did not resume since everyone in the room fled. In reality, the Hedy, jokingly named after Hollywood movie star Hedy Lamarr for her ability to distract men, later saved the lives of some trapped OSS operatives.

Not all projects worked. Some ideas were odd, such as a failed attempt to use insects to spread anthrax in Spain. Stanley Lovell was later quoted saying, "It was my policy to consider any method whatever that might aid the war, however unorthodox or untried".

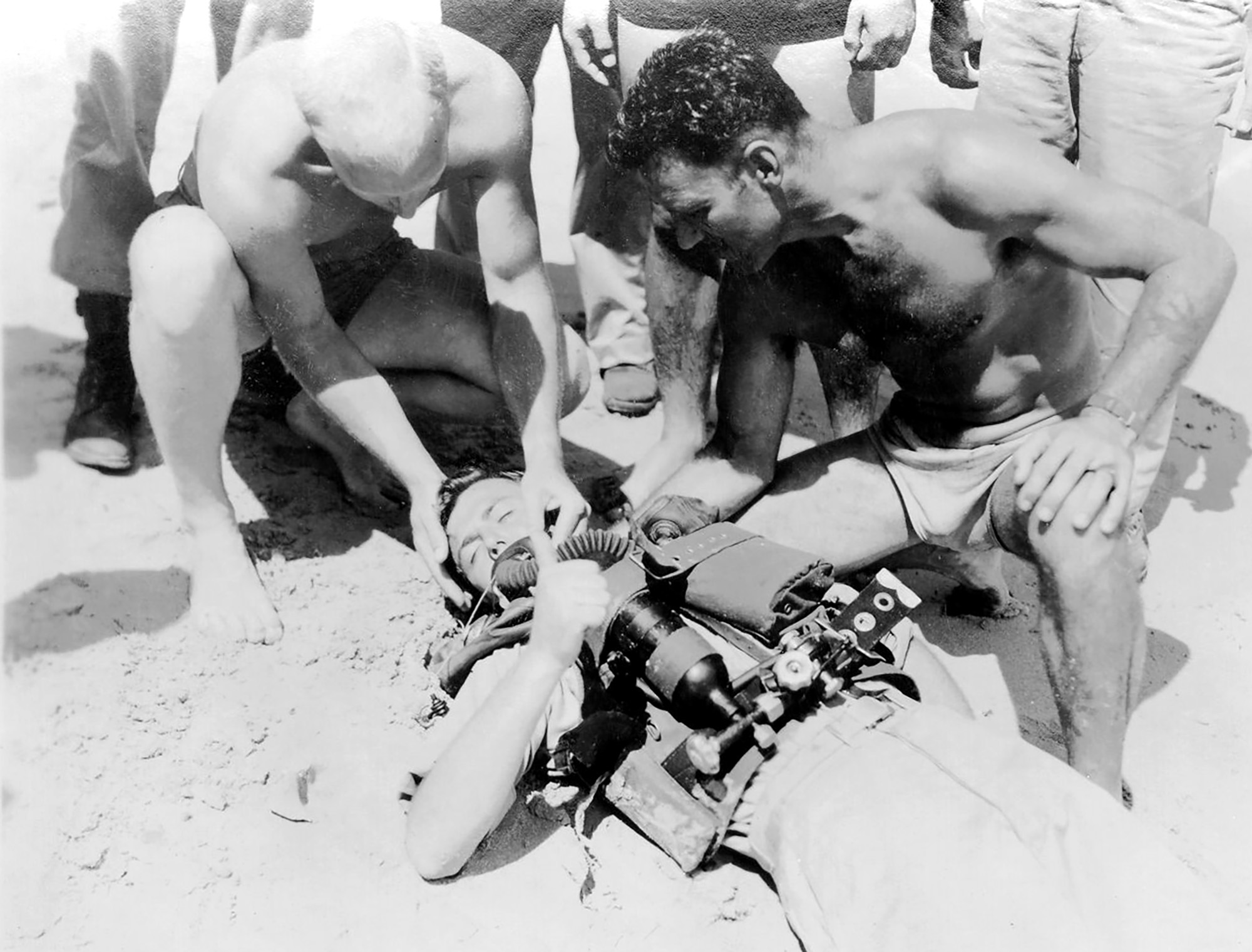
Underwater combat swimmer of the Office of Strategic Services Detachment 404 Maritime Unit

In 1939, a young physician named Christian J. Lambertsen developed an oxygen rebreather set (the Lambertsen Amphibious Respiratory Unit) and demonstrated it to the OSS—after already being rejected by the U.S. Navy—in a pool at the Shoreham Hotel in Washington D.C., in 1942. The OSS not only bought into the concept, they hired Lambertsen to lead the program and build up the dive element for the organization. His responsibilities included training and developing methods of combining self-contained diving and swimmer delivery including the Lambertsen Amphibious Respiratory Unit for the OSS "Operational Swimmer Group". Growing involvement of the OSS with coastal infiltration and water-based sabotage eventually led to creation of the OSS Maritime Unit.

== Headquarters and field offices ==
=== Headquarters ===
The COI was created out of offices in New York City, at 30 Rockefeller Plaza. They shared offices with the BSC for some time at 3603, where Donovan, Dulles, and the British worked closely together to draw-up the plans for the organization. Millard Preston Goodfellow was also drawn from the New York social elite. New York was a short distance from training facilities at the Federal Bureau of Narcotics (FBN) New York field office, and Whitby, Ontario. OSS maintained a presence in New York until its dissolution in 1945.

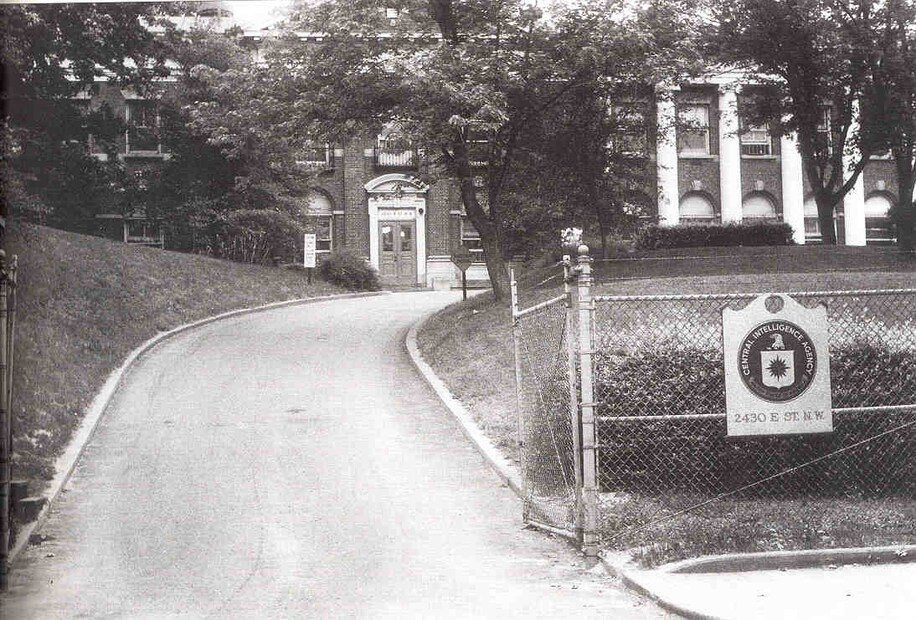
After moving to Washington, DC, the E Street Complex became the headquarters of the OSS. Later, the birthplace of the CIA.

The bulk of the OSS, after the expansion out of and away from COI, eventually found itself headquartered at a complex near 23rd Street and E Street in Washington, D.C. The E Street Complex was unassuming, appearing to be a mix of normal government offices and apartment buildings to nearby residents and office workers. The OSS Society and State Department have engaged in efforts with the National Park Service to add the Headquarters complex to the National Register of Historic Places.

Throughout the war, because of the secrecy of its work, the X-2 Counterintelligence Branch (CI) would maintain its own field bases detached from the rest of the OSS operations, hence the need for different addresses in several cities.

=== London Outpost ===
Through the course of the war, the OSS Theatres of Operation changed. Notice that North Africa is not included on this map, produced by the Maps Division of the Research and Analysis Branch

The largest and most impactful OSS office outside of the United States was at OSS/London, and covered activities within the European Theatre of Operations. OSS/London was located at 70 and 72 Grosvenor Street, Mayfair, London. This office was established within the COI at the end of 1941, and was absorbed into the OSS through the merger. Unlike some other field bases, which were only staffed by a single branch of OSS, OSS/London was staffed by members of every forward branch of the OSS. London has occasionally been referred to as the Forward Headquarters of OSS. William J. Casey ran SI Branch activities in London, who ran Free German and TOOL insertions into mainland Europe. The SO Branch also operated here, and their counterpart in the SOE in London was known as the "London Group," and these two groups, alongside SHAEF, organized the creation and management of Operation Jedburgh. Letters from Lieutenant Leonard Wilson, the chief of the London Maps Division, show that the Maps Division of R&A operated out of 51 Grosvenor Street.

=== Field Offices ===
Throughout the war, OSS had forward office headquarters in many cities. There were over 40 overseas bases around the world:

- Algiers
- Angola
- Athens
- Barcelona
- Bari
- Bern
- Bucharest
- Burma
- Cairo
- Calcutta
- Casablanca
- Caserta
- Chungking
- Denmark
- Heidelberg
- Honolulu
- Istanbul
- Kandy
- Kunming
- Madrid
- New Delhi
- Paris
- Pretoria
- Rome
- Shanghai
- Singapore
- Stockholm
- Tangier

== Training facilities ==
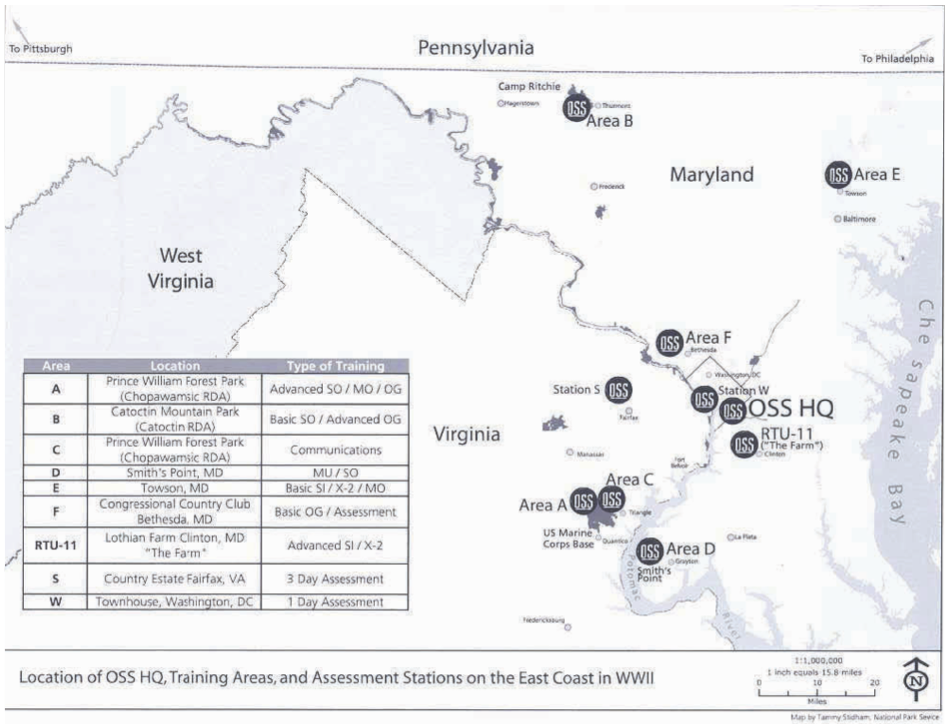
After establishing its training program, OSS maintained several training facilities on the East Coast, many of them owned by the National Park Service.

At Camp X, near Whitby, Ontario, an "assassination and elimination" training program was operated by the British Special Operations Executive, assigning exceptional masters in the art of knife-wielding combat, such as William E. Fairbairn and Eric A. Sykes, to instruct trainees. Many members of the Office of Strategic Services also were trained there. It was dubbed "the school of mayhem and murder" by George Hunter White who trained at the facility in the 1940's. Beginning in January 1941, Colonel Millard Preston Goodfellow, creator and Director of the Special Operations Branch (at this time still known as SA/G within the COI), negotiated with the National Park Service to obtain three tracts of land to be dedicated as training camps for both SA/G and SA/B. In March, he assigned Garland H. Williams to be the Training Director of these facilities.

Commander N.G.A Woolley was loaned to COI by the British Navy and helped Donovan and Goodfellow to organize underwater training and craft landing.

From these incipient beginnings, the Office of Strategic Services opened camps in the United States, and finally abroad. Prince William Forest Park (then known as Chopawamsic Recreational Demonstration Area) was the site of an OSS training camp that operated from 1942 to 1945. Area "C", consisting of approximately 6,000 acres (24 km^{2}), was used extensively for communications training, whereas Area "A" was used for training some of the OGs (Operational Groups). Catoctin Mountain Park, now the location of Camp David, was the site of OSS training Area "B" where the first Special Operations, or SO, were trained. Special Operations was modeled after Great Britain's Special Operations Executive, which included parachute, sabotage, self-defense, weapons, and leadership training to support guerrilla or partisan resistance. Considered most mysterious of all was the "cloak and dagger" Secret Intelligence, or SI branch. Secret Intelligence employed "country estates as schools for introducing recruits into the murky world of espionage. Thus, it established Training Areas E and RTU-11 ("the Farm") in spacious manor houses with surrounding horse farms." Morale Operations training included psychological warfare and propaganda. The Congressional Country Club (Area F) in Bethesda, Maryland, was the primary OSS training facility. The Facilities of the Catalina Island Marine Institute at Toyon Bay on Santa Catalina Island, Calif., are composed (in part) of a former OSS survival training camp. The National Park Service commissioned a study of OSS National Park training facilities by Professor John Chambers of Rutgers University.

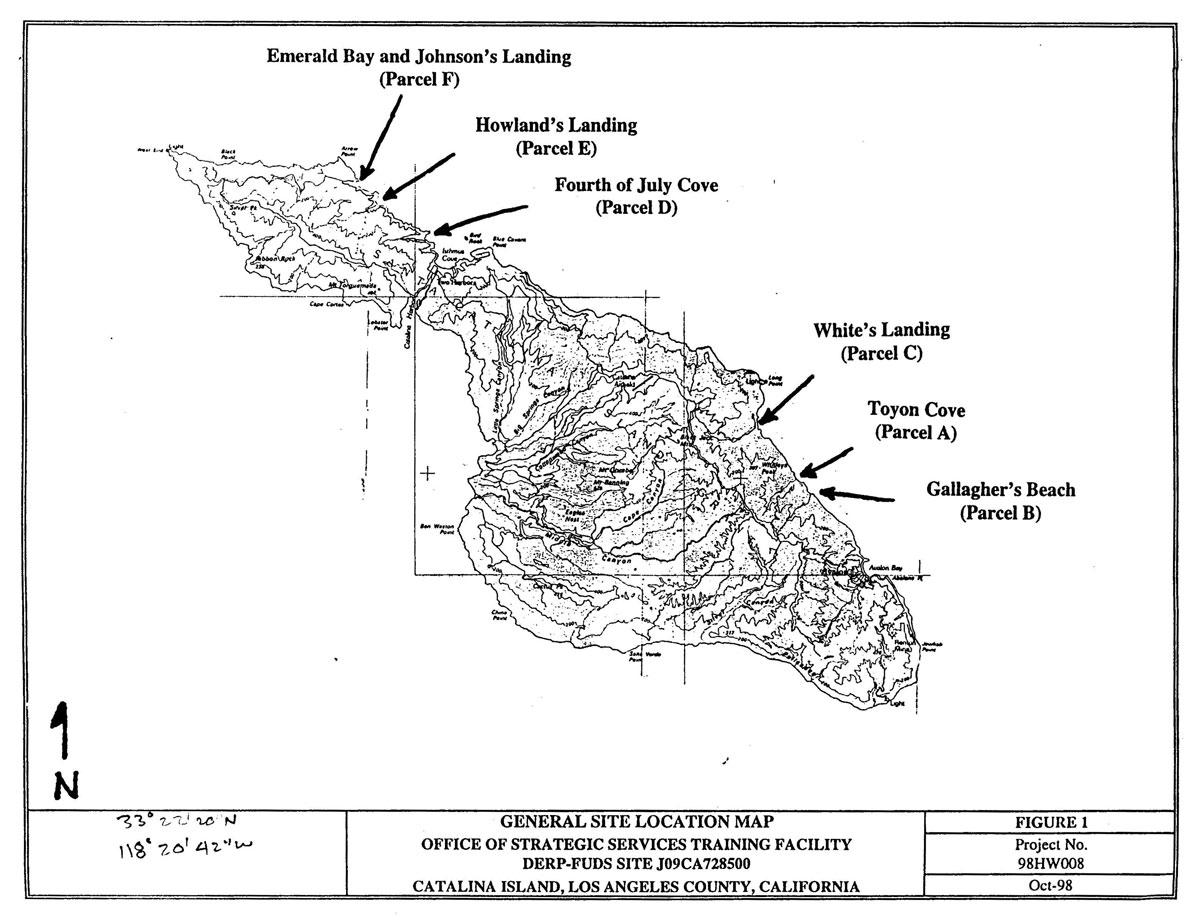
The OSS Maritime Unit (predecessor to the Navy SEALs and other US military frogmen programs) used Catalina to simulate occupied islands for its deployed operatives in the Pacific and Asia.

The main OSS training camps abroad were located initially in Great Britain, French Algeria, and Egypt; later as the Allies advanced, a school was established in southern Italy. In the Far East, OSS training facilities were established in India, Ceylon, and then China. The London branch of the OSS, its first overseas facility, was at 70 Grosvenor Street, W1. In addition to training local agents, the overseas OSS schools also provided advanced training and field exercises for graduates of the training camps in the United States and for Americans who enlisted in the OSS in the war zones. The most famous of the latter was Virginia Hall in France.

The OSS's Mediterranean training center in Cairo, Egypt, known to many as the Spy School, was a lavish palace belonging to King Farouk's brother-in-law, called Ras el Kanayas. It was modeled after the SOE's training facility STS 102 in Haifa, Palestine. Americans whose heritage stemmed from Italy, Yugoslavia, and Greece were trained at the "Spy School" and also sent for parachute, weapons, and commando training, and Morse code and encryption lessons at STS 102. After completion of their spy training, these agents were sent back on missions to the Balkans and Italy where their accents would not pose a problem for their assimilation.

== Personnel ==
=== Civilian ===
At the time of staffing COI and later the OSS, the British, and especially C, held firm to the notion that "intelligence is the business of gentlemen". Bill Donovan agreed with C on this point, and recruited the majority of these early members from the social elite of the Eastern Seaboard. So many of these were the relations of people on the "Social Register" that the OSS was often referred to as the "Oh So Social Club". COI attracted some of the top scientists, artists, economists, poets, and adventurers in the country.

Many of these original recruits were graduates of Ivy League schools, and especially linked to the Skull and Bones at Yale University. One prominent Skull at COI was Archibald MacLeish, who created the Research and Analysis Branch (R&A) and headquartered it out of the Library of Congress. For staffing its R&A, MacLeish and COI recruited from leading academic figures at institutions across the country, where by the war's end, R&A employed over 900 academics.

The members of the Research and Development Branch (R&D) recruited by Donovan and Goodfellow to work for Stanley Platt Lovell, however, were more or less considered pyromaniacs and mavericks who enjoyed making things blow up – which is why they were eventually tasked with such experiments as silenced pistols, the bat bomb and cat bomb.

Not all civilian academics were well-suited for their positions. In one specific example, OSS officer Kermit Roosevelt Jr. writes in the second volume of the official history of the OSS regarding officers deployed into Africa, that one contract agent completely ignored his assignment and effectively used OSS to fund his research: "...one anthropologist spent his six-month tour of duty acquiring apes, caring for them when they fell ill and eventually catching their disease himself." Roosevelt does not name the agent, but many anthropologists were indeed deployed by OSS around the world.

Julia Child, who later authored cookbooks, worked directly under Donovan.

=== Military ===
OSS military personnel, including soldiers, commandos, and frogmen were primarily inducted from the United States Armed Forces. These recruits came from all branches; the Army, Marines, Navy, and especially vital to maritime successes were its members from the Coast Guard. Among the hundreds of foreign nationals in its ranks were Prince Serge Obolensky and other displaced people from the former czarist Russia.

Donovan sought independent thinkers, saying: "I'd rather have a young lieutenant with enough guts to disobey a direct order than a colonel too regimented to think for himself." Seeking intelligent, quick-witted people who could think out-of-the box, he chose them from all walks of life, backgrounds, without distinction to culture or religion. Inspired by Britain's Special Operations Executive, he had clinical psychologists evaluate OSS candidates, including at Station S in northern Virginia near today's Dulles International Airport, whose records describe a quest for independent thought, effective intelligence, and interpersonal skills. In months, he formed an organization that soon rivalled Great Britain's Secret Intelligence Service.

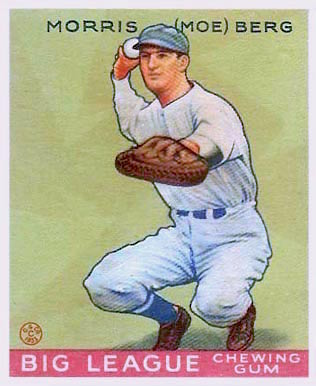
Major league baseball player Moe Berg of the Boston Red Sox was an OSS agent.

One such agent was Ivy League polyglot and Jewish American baseball catcher Moe Berg, who played 15 seasons in the major leagues. As an intelligence agent, he was dispatched to seek information on German physicist Werner Heisenberg and his knowledge on the atomic bomb. One of the most highly decorated and flamboyant OSS soldiers was US Marine Colonel Peter Ortiz. Enlisting early in the war as a French Foreign Legionnaire, he went on to join the OSS and to be the most highly decorated US Marine in the OSS during World War II.

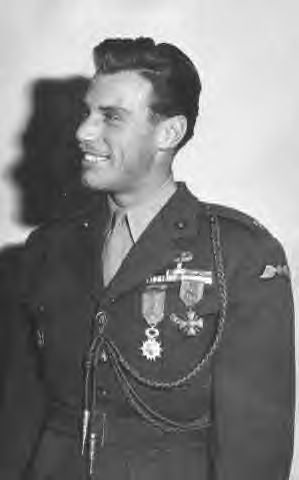
Col. Peter Ortiz, USMC

René Joyeuse M.D., MS, FACS was a Swiss, French and American soldier, physician and researcher, who distinguished himself as an agent of Allied intelligence in German-occupied France during World War II. He received the US Army Distinguished Service Cross for his actions with the OSS, after the war he became a physician, researcher and co-founder of the American Trauma Society.

"Jumping" Joe Savoldi (code name Sampson) was recruited by the OSS in 1942 because of his hand-to-hand combat and language skills as well as his deep knowledge of Italian geography and Benito Mussolini's compound. He was assigned to the Special Operations Branch and took part in missions in North Africa, Italy, and France during 1943–1945.

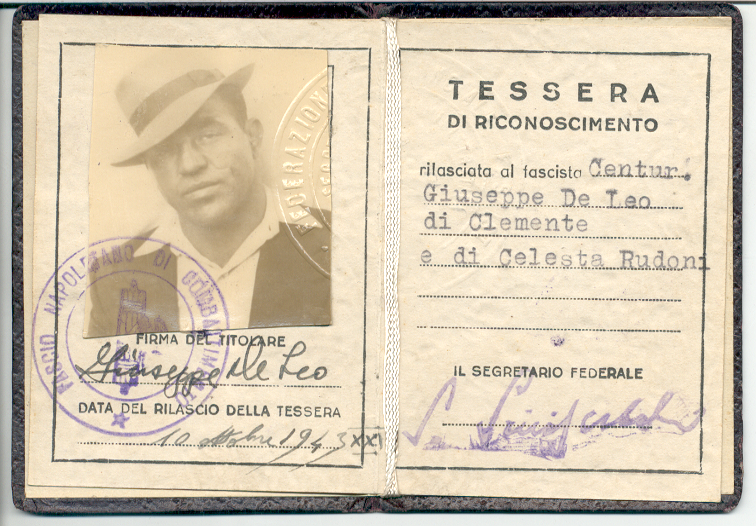
OSS created this false ID for Joe Savoldi - posing as Giuseppe De Leo while infiltrating the black market in Naples

One of the forefathers of today's commandos was Navy Lieutenant Jack Taylor. He was sequestered by the OSS early in the war and had a long career behind enemy lines.

Taro and Mitsu Yashima, both Japanese political dissidents who were imprisoned in Japan for protesting its militarist regime, worked for the OSS in psychological warfare against the Japanese Empire.

Nisei linguists

In late 1943, a representative from OSS visited the 442nd Infantry Regiment looking to recruit volunteers willing to undertake "extremely hazardous assignment." All selected were Nisei. The recruits were assigned to OSS Detachments 101 and 202, in the China-Burma-India Theater. "Once deployed, they were to interrogate prisoners, translate documents, monitor radio communications, and conduct covert operations... Detachment 101 and 102's clandestine operations were extremely successful."

The names of all 13,000 OSS personnel and documents of their OSS service were closely guarded secrets until they were released by the US National Archives on August 14, 2008. Among the 24,000 names were those of Sterling Hayden, Milton Wolff, Carl C. Cable, Julia Child, Ralph Bunche, Arthur Goldberg, Saul K. Padover, Arthur Schlesinger, Jr., Bruce Sundlun, William Colby, René Joyeuse, and John Ford. The 750,000 pages in the 35,000 personnel files include applications of people who were not recruited or hired, as well as the service records of those who served.

=== Women in the OSS ===
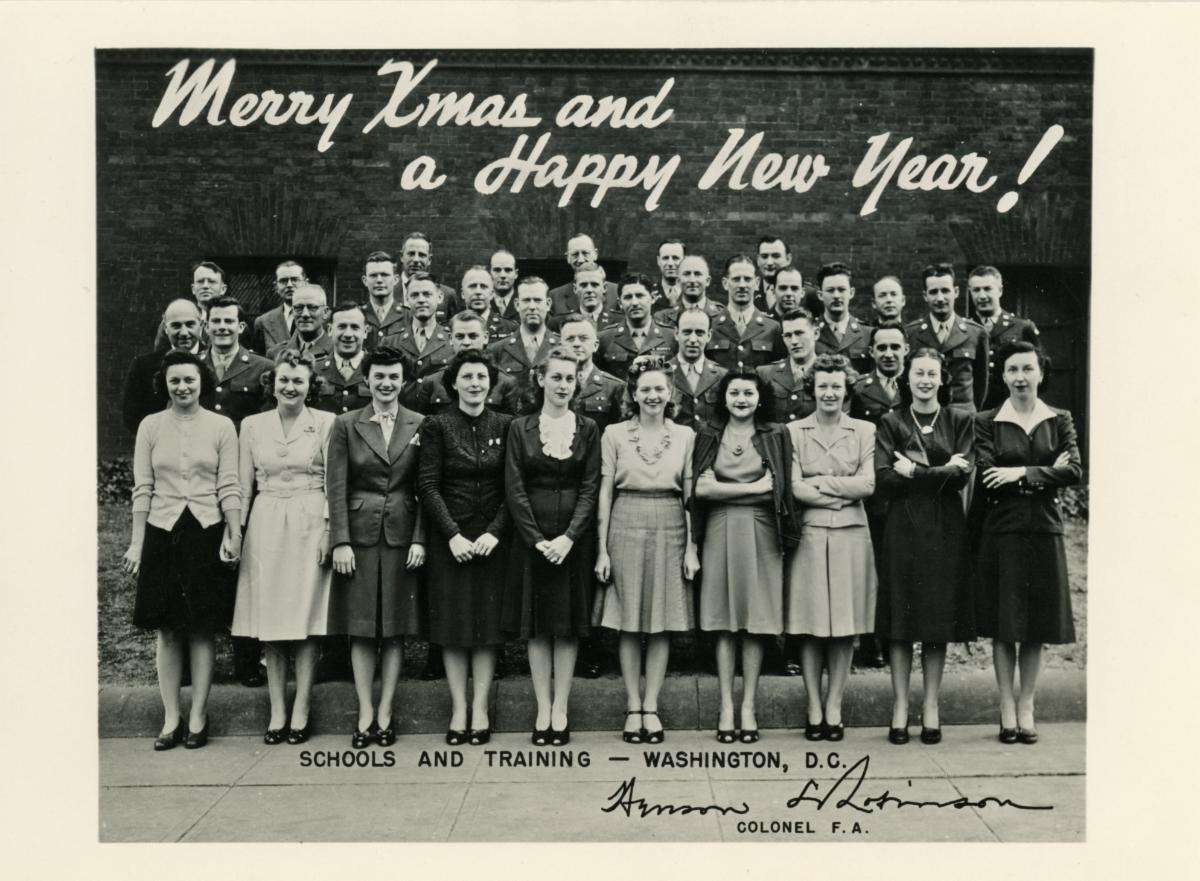
OSS Schools and Training Headquarters Staff, 1945 XMAS Card

Of the estimated 13,000 people who served in the OSS during World War II, more than 4,000 were women. Their work in a wide range of roles—espionage, intelligence analysis, research, communications, cartography, clerical work, and more—contributed to the organization's wartime success and helped shift gender norms in the decades that followed. Among them were Julia Child, who served in Washington, D.C., Ceylon, and China, where she handled the movement of classified documents in India;Marion A. Frieswyk, who as the first female intelligence cartographer for the Cartography Section helped create high-precision maps used in Allied military operations; and Eloise Page, William Donovan's secretary, nicknamed the "Iron Butterfly" for her manner and rank.

Many worked on black propaganda in the MO department. Some gained internal renown as "glamour girls", such as Virginia Hall, singer Marlene Dietrich, Betty McIntosh, and Barbara Lauwers. In Sisterhood of Spies, McIntosh reflects on the women's ability to "understand gossip in a way men never could". Lauwers worked on Operation Sauerkraut, which dispatched OSS to Allied prisoner-of-war camps to find and train German and Czech POWs to travel back across enemy lines to spread black propaganda meant to dismay Axis troops. Black propaganda for psychological effect was one of Donovan's key initiatives, inspired by the Nazis. Lauwers created the "League of Lonely War Women" to demoralize German soldiers: it spoke of a "custom" under which German soldiers on leave could find companionship by pinning a heart to their lapel, implying that the wives and partners of soldiers were being unfaithful at home.

Many women had familial or spousal connection to the war effort. Jane Hutton-Smith, wife and daughter to military officers, worked as the Washington manager of Far East MO, and trained field agents in spreading propaganda against Japanese soldiers. Her weekly Rumour Mill session with the staff involved spreading "devastating lies" about the wellbeing of the families of Japanese soldiers, creating misinformation on planned attacks, and disrupting "puppet" relations between Japan and China. She and her colleagues generally spoke Japanese, Russian, or had other linguistic skills.

Women served as liaisons with resistance groups in France, Yugoslavia, and elsewhere, shaping U.S. relations with these nations during and after the war. Hall helped organize, supply and train the French resistance. Novelist Mary Bancroft acted as a liaison between OSS officer Allen Dulles and German resistance groups.

OSS women had direct engagement with foreign nationals and Allied counterparts, shaping wartime diplomacy and postwar foreign policy by building trust with international partners and establishing precedents for female involvement in foreign service, which had long-term soft power affects. Many went to work for the CIA or State Department.

== Dissolution into other agencies ==
On September 20, 1945, President Harry S. Truman signed Executive Order 9621, terminating the OSS. Due to administrative error, the order only allowed the agency ten days to close. The State Department took over the Research and Analysis Branch (R&A); it became the Bureau of Intelligence and Research, The War Department took over the Secret Intelligence (SI) and Counter-Espionage (X-2) Branches, which were then housed in the new Strategic Services Unit (SSU). Brigadier General John Magruder (formerly Donovan's Deputy Director for Intelligence in OSS) became the new SSU director. He oversaw the liquidation of the OSS and managed the institutional preservation of its clandestine intelligence capability.

In January 1946, President Truman created the Central Intelligence Group (CIG), which was the direct precursor to the CIA. SSU assets, which now constituted a streamlined "nucleus" of clandestine intelligence, were transferred to the CIG in mid-1946 and reconstituted as the Office of Special Operations (OSO). The National Security Act of 1947 established the Central Intelligence Agency, which then took up some OSS functions. The direct descendant of the paramilitary component of the OSS is the CIA Special Activities Division.

Today, the joint-branch United States Special Operations Command, founded in 1987, uses the same spearhead design on its insignia, as homage to its indirect lineage. The Defense Intelligence Agency currently manages the OSS' mandate to provide strategic military intelligence to the Joint Chiefs of Staff and the Secretary of Defense and to coordinate human espionage activities across the United States Armed Forces (through the Defense Clandestine Service) and was awarded status as an OSS Heritage organization by the OSS Society.

== Branches ==
- Censorship and Documents
- Field Experimental Unit
- Foreign Nationalities
- Maritime Unit
- Morale Operations
- Operational Group Command
- Research & Analysis (RA)
- Research and Development (R&D or RnD)
- Secret Intelligence
- Security
- Special Operations
- Special Projects
- X-2 (Counterintelligence)

== Detachments ==
- OSS Deer Team: Vietnam
- OSS Detachment 101: Burma
- OSS Detachment 202: China
- OSS Detachment 303: New Delhi, India
- OSS Detachment 404: attached to British South East Asia Command in Kandy, Ceylon
- OSS Detachment 505: Calcutta, India
- Raven Mission: Laos

US Army units attached to the OSS

- 2671st Special Reconnaissance Battalion
- 2677th Office of Strategic Services Regiment

== See also ==
- Charles Douglas Jackson
- Dick Ellis
- Operation Paperclip
- Paramarines
- Special Forces (United States Army)
- X-2 Counter Espionage Branch
- History of espionage
- Art Looting Investigation Unit (ALIU)
- Millard Preston Goodfellow
- The Pond
- Garland H. Williams
- Intellipedia

== General and cited references ==
- Paulson, Alan (1995). "Required reading: OSS Weapons". Fighting Firearms. 3 (2): 20–21, 80–81.
- Brunner, John (1991). OSS Crossbows. Phillips Publications. ISBN 0932572154.
- Brunner, John (2005). OSS Weapons II. Phillips Publications. ISBN 978-0932572431.
