= Toyon Bay =

- Location within the United States
- Location: Santa Catalina Island, Los Angeles County, California
- Coordinates: 33°22′30″N 118°21′13″W
- Type: Bay
- Primary inflows: Swains Canyon
- Ocean/sea sources: Pacific Ocean, Catalina Channel

Toyon Bay is located on Catalina Island off the coast of California. Originally inhabited by a group of natives called Pipi Mari (or Pimugnans), and the Torqua, after whom a nearby spring is named. During the ownership of the island by William Banning, the site was known as Banning's Beach since it was used by the family for picnics. There was later a camp called Camp Banning for reform school boys and girls operated by the Whittier State School from 1902 until 1912. It then became the site of the Catalina Island School for Boys, a prestigious boarding school which officially opened on September 21, 1928 with an enrollment of 14 boys; some of the boarding school's buildings still exist. The school was founded by educator Kieth Vosburg. During World War II, the boys were evacuated and the facility was turned into an Office of Strategic Services training camp. Chinese and American men were trained in guerrilla warfare for use behind Japanese lines in China. The Office of Strategic Services was the precursor to the Central Intelligence Agency. After the war, it saw time as a boarding school, a singing camp, resort in the 1950s and was later abandoned.

In 1979, it was purchased by Guided Discoveries, Inc. and has since been run as the Catalina Island Marine Institute, a marine science facility for school children and summer campers.
