= Lambertsen Amphibious Respiratory Unit =

Early closed circuit oxygen diving rebreather

The Lambertsen Amphibious Respiratory Unit (LARU) is an early model of closed circuit oxygen rebreather used by military frogmen. Christian J. Lambertsen designed a series of them in the US in 1940 (patent filing date: 16 Dec 1940) and in 1944 (issue date: 2 May 1944).

== Etymology ==
The LARU is what the initials SCUBA (Self-Contained Underwater Breathing Apparatus) originally meant; Lambertsen changed his invention's name to SCUBA in 1952; but later "SCUBA", gradually changing to "scuba", came to mean (first in the USA) any self-contained underwater breathing apparatus. (Modern diving regulator technology was invented by Émile Gagnan and Jacques-Yves Cousteau in 1943 and was not related to rebreathers; nowadays the word SCUBA is largely used to mean Gagnan's and Cousteau's invention and its derivatives.)

== History ==
Lambertsen designed the LARU while a medical student and demonstrated the LARU to the Office of Strategic Services (OSS) (after already being rejected by the U.S. Navy) in a pool at the Shoreham Hotel in Washington D.C. in 1942 The OSS "Operational Swimmer Group" was formed and Lambertsen's responsibilities included training and developing methods of combining self-contained diving and swimmer delivery including the LARU.

== Design ==
- Two large lengthways backpack mounted cylinders under a hard metal cover: the right cylinder is high pressure oxygen and the left is the cylindrical absorbent canister.
- Fullface mask with two small viewports like an old-type gasmask
- Two counterlungs, one on each shoulder.
- A breathing conduit of 4 lengths of large-bore corrugated breathing tubes in a loop: from the mask to one of the breathing bags to the canister to the other breathing bag to the mask.
- Its harness is a strong cloth jacket that enclosed the diver's chest.
- Mid front, a long zipped pocket: the diagrams do not show whether it was for kit or for diving weights.

Many diving rebreathers are descended from it. However, there were earlier underwater uses of rebreathers:

- Davis Escape Set for use in emergency by submariners from 1927 onwards
- Siebe Gorman Salvus invented in the 1900s and first used in mines and by firemen
- The rebreathers used by the Italian Decima Flottiglia MAS frogmen in World War II
- Rebreathers used by British frogmen and divers in World War II and led to the 1950s Siebe Gorman CDBA used by the British

== See also ==
- Rebreather – Portable apparatus to recycle breathing gas
