= Christian J. Lambertsen =

American medical researcher (1917–2011)

Christian James Lambertsen
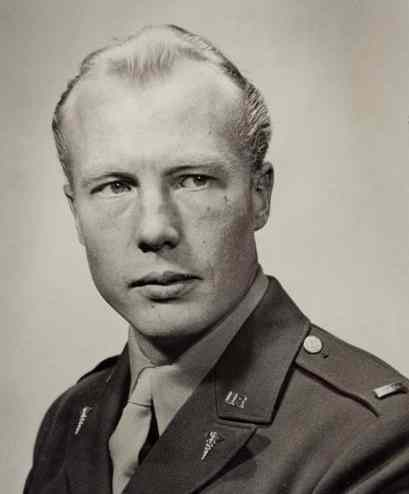
- Dr. Lambertsen, U.S. Army in 1942
- Born: May 15, 1917; Westfield, New Jersey, U.S.
- Died: February 11, 2011 (aged 93); Newtown Square, Pennsylvania, U.S.
- Education: Rutgers University, New Brunswick, New Jersey – B.S. (1939); University of Pennsylvania, Philadelphia, Pennsylvania – M.D. (1943)
- Known for: Research in tolerance and toxicity of respiratory gasses and development of diving procedures and equipment.
- Scientific career
- Fields: Aerospace medicine, Undersea medicine, Diving medicine, Hyperbaric medicine, Physiology, and Engineering.
- Workplaces: Institute for Environmental Medicine, University of Pennsylvania Medical Center, Philadelphia, Pennsylvania
- Doctoral students: M.L Gernhardt L.H Fenton

Notes
- Notes above from the Dr. Lambertsen's CV dated May 2008.

Christian James Lambertsen (May 15, 1917 – February 11, 2011) was an American medical researcher. He was a environmental medicine and diving medicine specialist who was principally responsible for developing the United States Navy frogmen's rebreathers in the early 1940s for underwater warfare. Lambertsen designed a series of rebreathers in 1940 (patent filing date: 16 Dec 1940) and in 1944 (patent issue date: 2 May 1944) and first called his invention breathing apparatus. Later, after the war, he called it Laru (acronym for Lambertsen Amphibious Respiratory Unit) and finally, in 1952, he changed his invention's name again to SCUBA (Self Contained Underwater Breathing Apparatus). Although diving regulator technology was invented by Émile Gagnan and Jacques-Yves Cousteau in 1943 and was unrelated to rebreathers, the current use of the word SCUBA is largely attributed to the Gagnan-Cousteau invention. The US Navy considers Lambertsen to be "the father of the Frogmen".

== Education ==
Lambertsen was born in Westfield, New Jersey, and raised in Scotch Plains, New Jersey, where he graduated from Scotch Plains-Fanwood High School in 1935; he was inducted into his high school's hall of fame in 2016. He attended Rutgers University in New Brunswick, New Jersey, graduating in 1939 with a bachelor of science degree. He graduated from University of Pennsylvania Medical School, Philadelphia, Pennsylvania in 1943.

Lambertsen was awarded an Honorary Doctor of Science Degree from Northwestern University in 1977.

== Army career ==
Major Lambertsen served in the U.S. Army Medical Corps from 1944 to 1946. He invented the first Self-contained Underwater Breathing Apparatus (SCUBA) and demonstrated it to the Office of Strategic Services (OSS) (after already being rejected by the U.S. Navy) in a pool at a hotel in Washington, D.C. OSS not only bought into the concept, they hired Major Lambertsen to lead the program and build-up the dive element of their maritime unit. He was vital in establishing the first cadres of U.S. military operational combat swimmers during late World War II. The OSS was also the predecessor of the Central Intelligence Agency (CIA) and the maritime element still exists inside their Special Activities Division.

His responsibilities included training and developing methods of combining self-contained diving and swimmer delivery including the Lambertsen Amphibious Respiratory Unit for the OSS "Operational Swimmer Group". Following World War II, he trained U.S. forces in methods for submerged operations, including composite fleet submarine / operational swimmers activity.

== Civilian career ==
From 1946 to 1953, Lambertsen served on the faculty of the Department of Pharmacology at the University of Pennsylvania School of Medicine, though he did spend a year as a Visiting Research Associate Professor from 1951 to 1952 for the Department of Physiology at University College London, England. Lambertsen spent the 1950s concentrating on national research needs in undersea medicine (see National Service Activities below). He again took an appointment as Professor of Pharmacology and Experimental Therapeutics at the University of Pennsylvania School of Medicine in 1962. He was also named Professor of Medicine in 1972 and Professor at the University of Pennsylvania School of Veterinary Medicine in 1976. Each of these appointments were held until 1987. In 1985, he became Emeritus Distinguished Professor of Environmental Medicine at the University of Pennsylvania.

Lambertsen was the founder and director of The Environmental Biomedical Stress Data Center at the University of Pennsylvania in Philadelphia, Pennsylvania.

The University of Pennsylvania's annual Christian J. Lambertsen Honorary Lecture is named for him. On May 31, 2007, the guest speaker was Professor Marc Feldmann, head of Imperial College's Kennedy Institute of Rheumatology who is recognised for his discovery of anti-TNF treatment for rheumatoid arthritis. Dr. Lambertsen was in attendance.

== Contributions to environmental medicine ==
=== Predictive Studies Series ===
Dr. Lambertsen's "Predictive Studies Series", spanning from 1969 with TEKTITE I to 1997, researched many aspects of humans in extreme environments.

== Awards ==
=== University and national civilian awards and honors ===
- 1948–1953 John and Mary R. Markle Scholar in Medical Science
- 1965 University of Pennsylvania Alumni Award of Merit
- 1967 Lindback Award for Distinguished Teaching
- 1969 NASA Commendation
- 1970 Aerospace Medical Association Award
- 1970 Undersea Medical Society Award
- 1972 Marine Technology Society Award for Ocean Science and Engineering
- 1973 Underwater Society of America Award for Science
- 1974 New York Academy of Sciences Award for Research in Environmental Science
- 1977 Member, National Academy of Engineering
- 1977 Doctor of Science Honorary Degree, Northwestern University
- 1977 Fellow, College of Physicians of Philadelphia
- 1978 Distinguished Award for Individuals, Offshore Technology Conference
- 1979 Award in Environmental Science, Aerospace Medical Association
- 1979 Award for Naval Undersea Research Training, Undersea Medical Society
- 1980 Association of Diving Contractors Award
- 1984 Endowed Visiting Lectureship, Sterling Pharmaceutical Corporation
- 1989 Distinguished Medical Graduate Award, University of Pennsylvania
- 1992 Boerema Award, Hyperbaric Oxygen Research, Undersea and Hyperbaric Medical Society
- 1995 UDT-SEAL Association Lifetime Achievement Award
- 1995 Department of Defense Citation
- 1997 UDT-SEAL Association: Honorary Lifetime Membership
- 1998 US Army Special Forces tab and Green Beret, formally inducted into 1st Special Forces Regiment US Army
- 1999 Beneath the Sea: Lifetime Achievement Award
- 2001 Pioneer Award – Navy Historical Society
- 2001 CJL Oxygen Symposium X, Undersea and Hyperbaric Medical Society
- 2007 American College of Physicians Fellowship Award 2007
- 2010 The John Scott Award, City of Philadelphia

=== Military service and related awards ===
- 1945 Legion of Merit, U.S. Army
- 1945 Major General William J. Donovan, U.S.A., Director, Office of Strategic Services
- 1945 Lt. Colonel H. Q. A. Reeves, British Army
- 1945 Lt. Commander Derek A. Lee, R.N.V.R., Burma
- 1945 Colonel Sylvester C. Missal, M.C., U.S.A., Chief Surgeon, Office of Strategic Services
- 1945 Commander H. G. A. Wooley, D.S.C., R.N., Director, Maritime Unit, Office of Strategic Services
- 1946 Presidential Unit Citation, O.S.S. Unit 101, Burma, Dwight D. Eisenhower
- 1946 U.S. Army Commendation Ribbon, Citation from Major General Norman Kirk, M.C., Surgeon General, U.S. Army
- 1946 Admiral J. F. Farley, Commandant, U.S. Coast Guard
- 1946 Colonel H. W. Doan, M.C., Executive Officer, Surgeon General's Office, U.S. Army
- 1947 Colonel George W. Read Jr., President, U.S. Army Ground Forces, Board No. 2
- 1948 General Jacob L. Devers, U.S.A. Commanding General, U.S. Army Ground Forces
- 1969 Meritorious Civilian Service Award, Secretary of the Navy
- 1969 Military Oceanography Award, Secretary of the Navy
- 1972 Department of Defense Distinguished Public Service Award
- 1972 Secretary of the Navy Certificate of Commendation for Advisory Service, Committee on Undersea Warfare, National Academy of Sciences
- 1976 Distinguished Public Service Award, United States Coast Guard
- 1978 Certificate of Commendation for Outstanding Service on Secretary of the Navy Oceanographic Advisory Committee
- 1995 British Embassy Citation
- 1995 U.S. Army Special Forces Underwater Operations School Award: Lifetime Achievement
- 1996 U.S. Special Forces Green Beret Award
- 2001 U.S. Special Operations Command Medal
- 2005 US Chief of Naval Operations Citation

== National service activities ==
- 1953–1960, 1962–1971 Committee on Naval Medical Research, National Research Council
- 1953–1972 Committee on Undersea Warfare, National Research Council
- 1953–1956 Chairman, Panel on Underwater Swimmers, Committee on Undersea Warfare, National Research Council
- 1954–1960 Chairman, Panel on Shipboard and Submarine Medicine, Committee on Naval Medicine Research, National Research Council
- 1954–1961 Advisory Panel on Medical Sciences, Office of Assistant Secretary of Defense, R and E
- 1955–1959 Consultant, U.S. Army Chemical Corps
- 1959–1961 Consultant, Scientific Advisory Board, U.S. Air Force
- 1960–1962 Chairman, Committee on Man-in-Space, Space Science Board, National Academy of Sciences
- 1960–1962 Member, Space Science Board, National Academy of Sciences
- 1962–1980 Consultant, Space Science Board, National Academy of Sciences
- 1967–1970 Member, President's Space Panel, PSAC
- 1968–1977 Oceanographic Advisory Committee, Office of Secretary of the Navy
- 1972 Consultant to the Diving Physiology and Technology Panel, U.S.-Japan Cooperative Program in Natural Resources, U.S. Department of the Interior
- 1972–1977 Biomedical Sciences Advisor, National Oceanic and Atmospheric Administration, U.S. Dept. of Commerce
- 1973–1977 Member, The Marine Board, National Academy of Engineering
- 1973 Member, Smithsonian Advisory Board
- 1983 Chairman, Environmental Sciences Review Committee, National Aeronautics and Space Administration (NASA)
- 1983–1986 National Undersea Research Center Advisory Board, National Oceanic and Atmospheric Administration
- 1983–1985 Space Medicine Advisory Panel, National Aeronautics and Space Administration
- 1984–1986 Lunar Base Planning Group, National Aeronautics and Space Administration
- 1989–1991 NASA Radiation and Environmental Health Working Group
- 1991–1993 NASA Life Sciences Division Environmental Biomedical Sciences Working Group
- 1992 NASA Life Sciences. Science and Technical Requirements Document for Space Station Freedom
- 1993 NASA JSC Medical Advisory Board, Hubble Space Telescope Repair EVA
- 1995 NASA JSC "In-Suit" Doppler Panel
- 1998 Chairman, NASA Advisory Panel, Committee on ISS Decompression Risk Definition & Contingency Plan
- 1998–1999 Chairman, NASA Life Sciences Decompression Research Peer Reviews

== Bibliography ==
=== Refereed journals ===
- Gelfand R, Lambertsen CJ, Clark JM (August 2006). "Ventilatory effects of prolonged hyperoxia at pressures of 1.5–3.0 ATA". Aviat Space Environ Med. 77 (8): 801–10. PMID 16909873.
- Clark JM, Lambertsen CJ, Gelfand R, Troxel AB (March 2006). "Optimization of oxygen tolerance extension in rats by intermittent exposure". J. Appl. Physiol. 100 (3): 869–79. doi:10.1152/japplphysiol.00047.2005. PMID 16306257.
- Lambertsen CJ (2004). "Oxygen 2002. Proceedings of the 10th Symposium on Underwater and Hyperbaric Physiology. La Jolla, California, USA, July 1–2, 2002. Symposium in honor of Dr. Christian J. Lambertsen". Undersea Hyperb Med. 31 (1): 1–183. PMID 15279000. Archived from the original on September 8, 2012.
- Floyd, T.F.; J.M. Clark; R. Gelfand; J.A. Detre; S. Ratcliffe; D. Guvakov; C.J. Lambertsen; R.G. Eckenhoff (December 2003). "Independent cerebral vasoconstrictive effects of hyperoxia and accompanying arterial hypocapnia at 1 ATA". J. Appl. Physiol. 95 (6): 2453–61. doi:10.1152/japplphysiol.00303.2003. PMID 12937024.
- Branger AB, Lambertsen CJ, Eckmann DM (February 2001). "Cerebral gas embolism absorption during hyperbaric therapy: theory". J. Appl. Physiol. 90 (2): 593–600. doi:10.1152/jappl.2001.90.2.593. PMID 11160058. S2CID 6813186.
- Clark, J. M.; C. J. Lambertsen; R. Gelfand; N. D. Flores; J. B. Pisarello; M. D. Rossman & J. A. Elias (January 1999). "Effects of prolonged oxygen exposure at 1.5, 2.0, or 2.5 ATA on pulmonary function in men (predictive studies V)". J. Appl. Physiol. 86 (1): 243–59. doi:10.1152/jappl.1999.86.1.243. PMID 9887137.
- Gelfand R, Lambertsen CJ, Clark JM, Hopkin E (January 1998). "Hypoxic ventilatory sensitivity in men is not reduced by prolonged hyperoxia (Predictive Studies V and VI)". J. Appl. Physiol. 84 (1): 292–302. doi:10.1152/jappl.1998.84.1.292. PMID 9451649.
- Lambertsen CJ (August 1998). "Invited editorial on "Fast and slow components of cerebral blood flow response to step decreases in end-tidal PCO2 in humans"". J. Appl. Physiol. 85 (2): 386–7. doi:10.1152/jappl.1998.85.2.386. PMID 9688709. S2CID 938076.
- Clark, J. M.; B. E. Skolnick; R. Gelfand; R. E. Farber; M. Stierheim; W. C. Stevens; G. Beck Jr.; C. J. Lambertsen (November 1996). "Relationship of 133Xe cerebral blood flow to middle cerebral arterial flow velocity in men at rest". J. Cereb. Blood Flow Metab. 16 (6): 1255–62. doi:10.1097/00004647-199611000-00021. PMID 8898699.
- Clark JM, Gelfand R, Lambertsen CJ, Stevens WC, Beck G, Fisher DG (April 1995). "Human tolerance and physiological responses to exercise while breathing oxygen at 2.0 ATA". Aviat Space Environ Med. 66 (4): 336–45. PMID 7794226.
- Clark JM, Jackson RM, Lambertsen CJ, Gelfand R, Hiller WD, Unger M (September 1991). "Pulmonary function in men after oxygen breathing at 3.0 ATA for 3.5 h". J. Appl. Physiol. 71 (3): 878–85. doi:10.1152/jappl.1991.71.3.878. PMID 1757324.
- Lambertsen, C. J. Physiologic factors in human organ oxygen tolerance extension. SPUMS 20(2): 109–120, April–May 1990.
- Lambertsen CJ (1988). "Extension of oxygen tolerance in man: philosophy and significance". Exp. Lung Res. 14 Suppl: 1035–58. doi:10.3109/01902148809064191. PMID 3061791.
- Dise CA, Clark JM, Lambertsen CJ, Goodman DB (February 1987). "Hyperbaric hyperoxia reversibly inhibits erythrocyte phospholipid fatty acid turnover". J. Appl. Physiol. 62 (2): 533–8. doi:10.1152/jappl.1987.62.2.533. PMID 3558213.
- Torbati D, Greenberg JH, Lambertsen CJ (April 1986). "Regional cerebral glucose metabolic rate during thirty minutes hypoxia of 7% oxygen in adult conscious rats". Neurosci. Lett. 65 (3): 253–8. doi:10.1016/0304-3940(86)90270-3. PMID 3714108. S2CID 13420964.
- Marsh RR, Lambertsen CJ, Schwartz DM, Clark JM, Wetmore RF (June 1985). "Auditory and vestibular function in hyperbaric oxygen". Otolaryngol Head Neck Surg. 93 (3): 390–3. doi:10.1177/019459988509300319. PMID 3927236. S2CID 39065754.
- Torbati D, Lambertsen CJ (September 1985). "The relationship between cortical electrical activity and regional cerebral glucose metabolic rate in rats exposed to 3 atmospheres absolute oxygen". Brain Res. 344 (1): 186–90. doi:10.1016/0006-8993(85)91208-9. PMID 4041867. S2CID 37492904.
- Torbati D, Lambertsen CJ, Greenberg J (April 1984). "Regional cerebral glucose utilization rates in rats during asymptomatic period of exposure to 1, 2 and 3 atmospheres absolute of oxygen". Neuroscience. 11 (4): 947–50. doi:10.1016/0306-4522(84)90205-7. PMID 6738861. S2CID 25195474.
- Torbati D, Lo P, Lambertsen CJ (September 1984). "Local cerebral glucose utilization rate following intermittent exposures to 2 atmosphere absolute oxygen". Neurosci. Lett. 50 (1–3): 79–84. doi:10.1016/0304-3940(84)90466-X. PMID 6493640. S2CID 21236378.
- Gelfand R, Lambertsen CJ, Strauss R, Clark JM, Puglia CD (January 1983). "Human respiration at rest in rapid compression and at high pressures and gas densities". J Appl Physiol. 54 (1): 290–303. doi:10.1152/jappl.1983.54.1.290. PMID 6402472.
- Torbati D, Greenberg J, Lambertsen CJ (March 1983). "Correlation of brain glucose utilization and cortical electrical activity during development of brain oxygen toxicity". Brain Res. 262 (2): 267–73. doi:10.1016/0006-8993(83)91017-X. PMID 6301635. S2CID 439141.
- Torbati D, Lambertsen CJ (November 1983). "Regional cerebral metabolic rate for glucose during hyperbaric oxygen-induced convulsions". Brain Res. 279 (1–2): 382–6. doi:10.1016/0006-8993(83)90215-9. PMID 6640354. S2CID 12865030.
- Bove AA, Clark JM, Simon AJ, Lambertsen CJ (March 1982). "Successful therapy of cerebral air embolism with hyperbaric oxygen at 2.8 ATA". Undersea Biomed Res. 9 (1): 75–80. PMID 7090084.
- Greene KM, Lambertsen CJ (June 1980). "Nature and treatment of decompression sickness occurring after deep excursion dives". Undersea Biomed Res. 7 (2): 127–39. PMID 7404850.
- Rothman HB, Gelfand R, Hollien H, Lambertsen CJ (December 1980). "Speech intelligibility at high helium-oxygen pressures". Undersea Biomed Res. 7 (4): 265–75. PMID 7233621. Archived from the original on May 9, 2012.
- Gelfand R, Lambertsen CJ, Peterson RE (March 1980). "Human respiratory control at high ambient pressures and inspired gas densities". J Appl Physiol. 48 (3): 528–39. doi:10.1152/jappl.1980.48.3.528. PMID 6768702.
- Ranade A, Lambertsen CJ, Noordergraaf A (1980). "Inert gas exchange in the middle ear". Acta Otolaryngol Suppl. 371: 1–23. doi:10.3109/00016488009136996. PMID 6272533.
- Cowley JR, Allegra C, Lambertsen CJ (July 1979). "Subcutaneous tissue gas space pressure during superficial isobaric counterdiffusion". J Appl Physiol. 47 (1): 224–7. doi:10.1152/jappl.1979.47.1.224. PMID 468665.
- Cowley JR, Lambertsen CJ (July 1979). "Isobaric gas counterdiffusion in rabbit eye". J Appl Physiol. 47 (1): 220–3. doi:10.1152/jappl.1979.47.1.220. PMID 468664.
- Dueker CW, Lambertsen CJ, Rosowski JJ, Saunders JC (December 1979). "Middle ear gas exchange in isobaric counterdiffusion". J Appl Physiol. 47 (6): 1239–44. doi:10.1152/jappl.1979.47.6.1239. PMID 536296.
- Spencer J, Findling A, Bachrach AJ, Gelfand R, Lambertsen CJ, Karreman G (October 1979). "Tremor and somatosensory studies during chamber He-O2 compressions to 13.1, 25.2, 37.3, and 49.4 ATA". J Appl Physiol. 47 (4): 804–12. doi:10.1152/jappl.1979.47.4.804. PMID 511689.
- Takano N, Lever MJ, Lambertsen CJ (February 1979). "Acid-base curve nomogram for chimpanzee blood and comparison with human blood characteristics". J Appl Physiol. 46 (2): 381–6. doi:10.1152/jappl.1979.46.2.381. PMID 33940.
- Gelfand, R., C.J. Lambertsen, J.M. Clark, N. Egawa and C.D. Puglia. Ventilatory and cardiac adjustments during rapid compressions to pressure equivalents of 400-800-1200-1600 feet of sea water. Med. Aeronaut. Spatiale Med. Subaquat. Hyperbare. 17(65): 114–116, 1978.
- Lambertsen, C.J., J.P.W. Cunnington and J.R.M. Cowley. The dynamics and composition of spontaneous, continuous gas embolism in the pig during isobaric gas counterdiffusion. Fed. Proc. 34: 452, 1975.
- Lambertsen, C.J.; R. Gelfand; R.E. Peterson; R. Strauss; W.B. Wright; J.G. Dickson Jr.; C. Puglia; R.W. Hamilton Jr. (September 1977). "Human tolerance to He, Ne, and N2 at respiratory gas densities equivalent to He-O2 breathing at depths to 1200, 2000, 3000, 4000, and 5,000 feet (1,500 m) of sea water (predictive studies III)". Aviat Space Environ Med. 48 (9): 843–53. PMID 303098.
- Karreman G, Lambertsen CJ (1977). "Kinetics of isobaric counterdiffusion". Bull. Math. Biol. 39 (5): 587–95. doi:10.1007/bf02461204. PMID 196707. S2CID 189886442.
- Gelfand R, Lambertsen CJ, Peterson RE, Slater A (July 1976). "Pneumotachograph for flow and volume measurement in normal and dense atmospheres". J Appl Physiol. 41 (1): 120–4. doi:10.1152/jappl.1976.41.1.120. PMID 972125.
- Lambertsen CJ, Idicula J (September 1975). "A new gas lesion syndrome in man, induced by "isobaric gas counterdiffusion"". J Appl Physiol. 39 (3): 434–43. doi:10.1152/jappl.1975.39.3.434. PMID 170242.
- Gelfand R, Lambertsen CJ (December 1973). "Dynamic respiratory response to abrupt change of inspired CO2 at normal and high PO2". J Appl Physiol. 35 (6): 903–13. doi:10.1152/jappl.1973.35.6.903. PMID 4765831.
- Alexander WC, Leach CS, Fischer CL, Lambertsen CJ, Johnson PC (July 1973). "Hematological, biochemical, and immunological studies during a 14-day continuous exposure to 5.2 per cent O 2 in N 2 at pressure equivalent to 100 FSW (4 ATA)". Aerosp Med. 44 (7): 850–4. PMID 4123806.
- Graves DJ, Idicula J, Lambertsen CJ, Quinn JA (February 1973). "Bubble formation in physical and biological systems: a manifestation of counterdiffusion in composite media". Science. 179 (4073): 582–4. Bibcode:1973Sci...179..582G. doi:10.1126/science.179.4073.582. PMID 4686464. S2CID 46428717.
- Graves DJ, Idicula J, Lambertsen CJ, Quinn JA (March 1973). "Bubble formation resulting from counterdiffusion supersaturation: a possible explanation for isobaric inert gas 'urticaria' and vertigo". Phys Med Biol. 18 (2): 256–64. Bibcode:1973PMB....18..256G. doi:10.1088/0031-9155/18/2/009. PMID 4805115. S2CID 250737144.
- Johnson PC, Driscoll TB, Alexander WC, Lambertsen CJ (July 1973). "Body fluid volume changes during a 14-day continuous exposure to 5.2 per cent O 2 in N 2 at pressure equivalent to 100 FSW (4 ATA)". Aerosp Med. 44 (7): 860–3. PMID 4716937.
- Lambertsen CJ, Wright WB (July 1973). "Multiday exposure to 5.2 per cent O 2 at 4 ATA. Scope of program". Aerosp Med. 44 (7): 828–33. PMID 4716933.
- Lambertsen CJ, Wright WB (July 1973). "Multiday exposure of men to high nitrogen pressure and increased airway resistance at natural expired oxygen tension: a 14-day continuous exposure to 5.2 per cent O 2 in N 2 at 4.0 atmospheres absolute pressure". Aerosp Med. 44 (7): 826–7. PMID 4716932.
- Lambertsen CJ, Bardin H (July 1973). "Decompression from acute and chronic exposure to high nitrogen pressure". Aerosp Med. 44 (7): 834–6. PMID 4716934.
- Lambertsen, C.J.; R. Gelfand; M.J. Lever; G. Bodammer; N. Takano; T.A. Reed; J.G. Dickson & P.T. Watson. (July 1973). "Respiration and gas exchange during a 14-day continuous exposure to 5.2 per cent O2 in N2 at pressure equivalent to 100 FSW (4 ATA)". Aerosp Med. 44 (7): 844–9. PMID 4716936.
- Leach CS, Alexander WC, Fischer CL, Lambertsen CJ, Johnson PC (July 1973). "Endocrine studies during a 14-day continuous exposure to 5.2 per cent O 2 in N 2 at pressure equivalent to 100 FSW (4 ATA)". Aerosp Med. 44 (7): 855–9. PMID 4352047.
- Wright WB, Fisher AB, Hendricks PL, Brody JS, Lambertsen CJ (July 1973). "Pulmonary function studies during a 14-day continuous exposure to 5.2 per cent O2 in N2 at pressure equivalent to 100 FSW (4 ATA)". Aerosp Med. 44 (7): 837–43. PMID 4716935.
- Lambertsen CJ (September 1972). "Oxygen in the therapy of gas gangrene". J Trauma. 12 (9): 825–7. doi:10.1097/00005373-197209000-00020. PMID 5073407.
- Nichols CW, Yanoff M, Hall DA, Lambertsen CJ (April 1972). "Histologic alterations produced in the eye by oxygen at high pressure". Arch. Ophthalmol. 87 (4): 417–21. doi:10.1001/archopht.1972.01000020419011. PMID 5018246.
- Clark JM, Lambertsen CJ (May 1971). "Rate of development of pulmonary O2 toxicity in man during O2 breathing at 2.0 Ata". J Appl Physiol. 30 (5): 739–52. doi:10.1152/jappl.1971.30.5.739. PMID 4929472.
- Clark JM, Lambertsen CJ (May 1971). "Alveolar-arterial O2 differences in man at 0.2, 1.0, 2.0, and 3.5 Ata inspired PO2". J Appl Physiol. 30 (5): 753–63. doi:10.1152/jappl.1971.30.5.753. PMID 5572798.
- Clark JM, Lambertsen CJ (June 1971). "Pulmonary oxygen toxicity: a review". Pharmacol. Rev. 23 (2): 37–133. PMID 4948324.
- Fisher AB, DuBois AB, Hyde RW, Knight CJ, Lambertsen CJ (January 1970). "Effect of 2 months' undersea exposure to N2-O2 at 2.2 Ata on lung function". J Appl Physiol. 28 (1): 70–4. doi:10.1152/jappl.1970.28.1.70. PMID 5409792.
- Lambertsen CJ, Bullard RW (November 1970). "Introduction—the scope of the symposium". Aerosp Med. 41 (11): 1265. PMID 5490162.
- Lambertsen, C.J., and R.W. Bullard (eds.). Temperature limitations in manned undersea and aerospace operations. Aerospace Med. 41: 1263–1288, 1970.
- Nichols CW, Lambertsen CJ, Clark JM (April 1969). "Transient unilateral loss of vision associated with oxygen at high pressure". Arch. Ophthalmol. 81 (4): 548–52. doi:10.1001/archopht.1969.00990010550015. PMID 5777761.
- Nichols CW, Lambertsen C (July 1969). "Effects of high oxygen pressures on the eye". N. Engl. J. Med. 281 (1): 25–30. doi:10.1056/NEJM196907032810106. PMID 4891642.
- Lambertsen, C.J. (ed.). Modern aspects of treatment of decompression sickness. Aerospace Med. 39: 1055–1093, 1968.
- Lambertsen CJ (October 1968). "Concepts for advances in the therapy of bends in undersea and aerospace activity". Aerosp Med. 39 (10): 1086–93. PMID 5678083.
- Puy RJ, Hyde RW, Fisher AB, Clark JM, Dickson J, Lambertsen CJ (April 1968). "Alterations in the pulmonary capillary bed during early O2 toxicity in man". J Appl Physiol. 24 (4): 537–43. doi:10.1152/jappl.1968.24.4.537. PMID 5643401.
- Fisher AB, Hyde RW, Puy RJ, Clark JM, Lambertsen CJ (April 1968). "Effect of oxygen at 2 atmospheres on the pulmonary mechanics of normal man". J Appl Physiol. 24 (4): 529–36. doi:10.1152/jappl.1968.24.4.529. PMID 5643400.
- Lambertsen CJ (1968). "Limitations and breakthroughs in manned undersea activity". Triangle. 8 (5): 167–77. PMID 5760415.
- Reivich M, Dickson J, Clark J, Hedden M, Lambertsen CJ (1968). "Role of hypoxia in cerebral circulatory and metabolic changes during hypocarbia in man: studies in hyperbaric milieu". Scand. J. Clin. Lab. Invest. Suppl. 102: IV–B. doi:10.3109/00365516809168978. PMID 4283874.
- Downes JJ, Kemp RA, Lambertsen CJ (December 1967). "The magnitude and duration of respiratory depression due to fentanyl and meperidine in man". J. Pharmacol. Exp. Ther. 158 (3): 416–20. PMID 6073225.
- MacInnis J, Dickson JG, Lambertsen CJ (April 1967). "Exposure of mice to a helium-oxygen atmosphere at pressure to 122 atmospheres". J Appl Physiol. 22 (4): 694–8. doi:10.1152/jappl.1967.22.4.694. PMID 6023182.
- Downes JJ, Lambertsen CJ (March 1966). "Dynamic characteristics of ventilatory depression in man on abrupt administration of O". J Appl Physiol. 21 (2): 447–53. doi:10.1152/jappl.1966.21.2.447. PMID 5934447.
- Lambertsen CJ (1966). "Drugs and respiration". Annu Rev Pharmacol. 6: 327–78. doi:10.1146/annurev.pa.06.040166.001551. PMID 5324857.
- Lambertsen CJ, Gelfand R (January 1966). "Breath-by-breath measurement of respiratory functions: instrumentation and applications". J Appl Physiol. 21 (1): 282–90. doi:10.1152/jappl.1966.21.1.282. PMID 5903926.
- Nairn JR, Power GG, Hyde RW, Forster RE, Lambertsen CJ, Dickson J (October 1965). "Diffusing capacity and pulmonary capillary blood flow at hyperbaric pressures". J. Clin. Invest. 44 (10): 1591–9. doi:10.1172/JCI105265. PMC 292643. PMID 5840529.
- Lambertsen, C.J. (July 1965). "Medical implications of high oxygen pressures". Trans Stud Coll Physicians Phila. 33: 1–18. PMID 14344614.
- Lambertsen, C.J. (January 1965). "Hyperbaric oxygenation. Oxygen. Introductory remarks". Ann. N. Y. Acad. Sci. 117 (2 Hyperbaric Oy): 727–9. Bibcode:1965NYASA.117..727L. doi:10.1111/j.1749-6632.1964.tb48228.x. PMID 14252021.
- Schmidt, C.F.; C.J. Lambertsen (1965). "Pharmacology in space medicine". Annu Rev Pharmacol. 10: 383–404. doi:10.1146/annurev.pa.05.040165.002123. PMID 14287889.
- Lambertsen, C.J. (April 1963). "The philosophy of extremes for the gaseous environment of manned, closed ecological systems". Aerosp Med. 34: 291–9. PMID 13928280.
- Lambertsen, C.J. (1963). "Physiological interactions and gaseous environment in manned exploration of space". Fed. Proc. 22: 1046–50. PMID 14046275.
- Lambertsen, C.J.; P. Hall; H. Wollman & M.W. Goodman (June 1963). "Quantitative interactions of increased Po2 and Pco2 upon respiration in man". Ann. N. Y. Acad. Sci. 109 (2): 731–42. Bibcode:1963NYASA.109..731L. doi:10.1111/j.1749-6632.1963.tb13502.x. PMID 13928279. S2CID 31612873.
- Alexander, S.C.; R.D. Workman; C.J. Lambertsen (June 1962). "Hyperthermia, lactic acid infusion, and the composition of arterial blood and cerebrospinal fluid". Am. J. Physiol. 202 (6): 1049–54. doi:10.1152/ajplegacy.1962.202.6.1049. PMID 13860364.
- Pierce, E.C. Jr.; C.J. Lambertsen; S. Deutsch; P.E. Chase; H.W. Linde; R.D. Dripps; H.L. Price (August 1962). "Cerebral Circulation and Metabolism During Thiopental Anesthesia and Hyperventilation in Man". J. Clin. Invest. 41 (8): 1664–71. doi:10.1172/JCI104623. PMC 291083. PMID 14486452.
- Pierce, E.C. Jr.; C.J. Lambertsen; M.J. Strong; S.C. Alexander; D. Steele (November 1962). "Blood P-CO2 and brain oxygenation at reduced ambient pressure". J Appl Physiol. 17 (6): 899–908. doi:10.1152/jappl.1962.17.6.899. PMID 13943396.
- Alexander, S.C.; R. Gelfand; C.J. Lambertsen (February 1961). "The pK' of carbonic acid in cerebrospinal fluid". J. Biol. Chem. 236 (2): 592–6. doi:10.1016/S0021-9258(18)64409-6. PMID 13682371.
- Toole; J. F.; L.J. Barrows; C.J. Lambertsen; B. Roberts (March 1961). "Cerebral ischemia and infarction". Am Pract Dig Treat. 12: 147–54. PMID 13777430.
- Lambertsen, C.J.; S.J.G. Semple; M.G. Smyth & R. Gelfand (May 1961). "H and pCO2 as chemical factors in respiratory and cerebral circulatory control". J Appl Physiol. 16 (3): 473–84. doi:10.1152/jappl.1961.16.3.473. PMID 13758471.
- Lambertsen, C.J.; H. Wendel; J.B. Longenhagen (March 1961). "The separate and combined respiratory effects of chlorpromazine and meperidine in normal men controlled at 46 mm Hg alveolar pCO2". J. Pharmacol. Exp. Ther. 131: 381–93. PMID 13758472.
- Marshall, J.R.; C.J. Lambertsen (January 1961). "Interactions of increased pO2 and pCO2 effects in producing convulsions and death in mice". J Appl Physiol. 16: 1–7. doi:10.1152/jappl.1961.16.1.1. PMID 13767222.
- Lambertsen, C.J. (1960). "Carbon dioxide and respiration in acid-base homeostasis". Anesthesiology. 21 (6): 642–51. doi:10.1097/00000542-196011000-00008. PMID 13758473.
- Lambertsen, C.J.; S.G. Owen (1960). "Continuous, constant-rate sampling modification of nitrous oxide method for cerebral blood flow in man". Methods Med Res. 8: 262–9. PMID 14413615.
- Lambertsen, C.J.; H. Wendel (January 1960). "An alveolar carbon dioxide tension control system: its use to magnify respiratory depression by meperidine". J Appl Physiol. 15: 43–8. doi:10.1152/jappl.1960.15.1.43. PMID 14413616.
- Lambertsen, C.J.; J.M. Benjamin Jr. (September 1959). "Breath-by-breath sampling of end-expiratory gas". J Appl Physiol. 14 (5): 711–6. doi:10.1152/jappl.1959.14.5.711. PMID 14413613.
- Lambertsen, C.J.; S.G. Owen; H. Wendel; M.W. Stroud; A.A. Luria; W. Lochner; G.F. Clark (November 1959). "Respiratory and cerebral circulatory control during exercise at .21 and 2.0 atmospheres inspired p02". J Appl Physiol. 14 (6): 966–82. doi:10.1152/jappl.1959.14.6.966. PMID 14413614.
- Lambertsen, C.J. (July 1958). "From submarines to satellites". Circ. Res. 6 (4): 405–9. doi:10.1161/01.res.6.4.405. PMID 13547394.
- Lambertsen, C.J.; J.H. Ewing; R.H. Kough; R.A. Gould; M.W. Stroud 3rd (November 1955). "Oxygen toxicity; arterial and internal jugular blood gas composition in man during inhalation of air, 100% O2 and 2% CO2 in O2 at 3.5 atmospheres ambient pressure". J Appl Physiol. 8 (3): 255–63. doi:10.1152/jappl.1955.8.3.255. PMID 13271251.
- Stroud, M.W. 3rd; C.J. Lambertsen; J.H. Ewing; R.H. Kough; R.A. Gould; C.F. Schmidt (August 1955). "The effects of aminophylline and meperidine alone and in combination on the respiratory response to carbon dioxide inhalation". J. Pharmacol. Exp. Ther. 114 (4): 461–9. PMID 13252564.
- Daly, M.deB.; C.J. Lambertsen; A. Schweitzer (July 1954). "Observations on the volume of blood flow and oxygen utilization of the carotid body in the cat". J. Physiol. 125 (1): 67–89. doi:10.1113/jphysiol.1954.sp005143. PMC 1365696. PMID 13192758.
- Daly, M.deB.; C.J. Lambertsen; A. Schweitzer (August 1953). "Some observations on the carotid body blood flow in the cat". Am. J. Med. Sci. 226 (2): 230. PMID 13065304.
- Daly, Lambertsen CJ, Schweitzer A (1953). "The effects upon the bronchial musculature of altering the oxygen and carbon dioxide tensions of the blood perfusing the brain". J. Physiol. 119 (2&3): 292–314. doi:10.1113/jphysiol.1953.sp004848. PMC 1392795. PMID 13035754.
- Lambertsen, C.J.; R.H. Kough; D.Y. Cooper; G.L. Emmel; H.H. Loeschcke & C.F. Schmidt (March 1953). "Oxygen toxicity; effects in man of oxygen inhalation at 1 and 3.5 atmospheres upon blood gas transport, cerebral circulation and cerebral metabolism". J Appl Physiol. 5 (9): 471–86. doi:10.1152/jappl.1953.5.9.471. PMID 13034675.
- Lambertsen, C.J.; Kough, R.H.; Cooper, D.Y.; Emmel, G.L.; Loeschcke, H.H.; Schmidt, C.F. (1953). "Comparison of relationship of respiratory minute volume to PCO2 and pH of arterial and internal jugular blood in normal man during hyperventilation produced by low concentrations of CO2 at 1 atmosphere and by O2 at 3.0 atmospheres". J. Appl. Physiol. 5 (12): 803–813. doi:10.1152/jappl.1953.5.12.803.
- Lambertsen, C.J.; M.W. Stroud 3rd; J.H. Ewing; C. Mack (December 1953). "Oxygen toxicity; effects of oxygen breathing at increased ambient pressure upon pCO2 of subcutaneous gas depots in men, dogs, rabbits and cats". J Appl Physiol. 6 (6): 358–68. doi:10.1152/jappl.1953.6.6.358. PMID 13117765.
- Lambertsen, C.J.; M.W. Stroud 3rd; R.A. Gould; R.H. Kough; J.H. Ewing; C.F. Schmidt (March 1953). "Oxygen toxicity; respiratory responses of normal men to inhalation of 6 and 100 per cent oxygen under 3.5 atmospheres pressure". J Appl Physiol. 5 (9): 487–93. doi:10.1152/jappl.1953.5.9.487. PMID 13034676.
- Loeschcke, H.H.; A. Sweel; R.H. Kough & C.J. Lambertsen (July 1953). "The effect of morphine and of meperidine (dolantin, demerol) upon the respiratory response of normal men to low concentrations of inspired carbon dioxide". J. Pharmacol. Exp. Ther. 108 (3): 376–83. PMID 13070158.
- De Daly MB, Lambertsen CJ, Schweitzer A (August 1952). "Bronchomotor responses to altering the gaseous composition of the blood perfusing the brain" (PDF). J. Physiol. 117 (4): 60P–61P. doi:10.1113/jphysiol.1952.sp004767. PMID 12991251. S2CID 222187241.
- Lambertsen, C.J.; P.L. Bunce; D.L. Drabkin & C.F. Schmidt (June 1952). "Relationship of oxygen tension to hemoglobin oxygen saturation in the arterial blood of normal men". J Appl Physiol. 4 (12): 873–85. doi:10.1152/jappl.1952.4.12.873. PMID 14946085.
- Lambertsen CJ, Clark JK (December 1949). "The pulmonary oxygen diffusion coefficient". Am. J. Med. Sci. 218 (6): 715. PMID 15393997.
- Lambertsen, C.J. Problems of shallow water diving. Report based on experiences of operational swimmers of the Office of Strategic Services. Occup. Med. 3: 230–245, 1947.
- Lambertsen, C.J., and L. Godfrey. A small efficient hood for oxygen therapy. J.A.M.A. 125: 492–493, 1944.
- Lambertsen, C.J. A diving apparatus for life saving work. J.A.M.A. 116: 1387–1389, 1941.
- Atkinson, W.J. Jr., J.L. Dean, E.H. Kennerdell and C.J. Lambertsen. A multiple anomaly of the human heart and pulmonary veins. Anat. Record 78(3): 383–388, 1940.

=== Patents ===
- 1944 US 2348074 "Breathing Apparatus." for Use Under Water
- 1944 US 2362643 "Breathing Apparatus." for Use Under Water
- 1947 US 2418473 "Hood for Oxygen Therapy."
- 1948 US 2456130 "Breathing Apparatus." for Use Under Water
- 1952 US 2586670 "Selective Gas Absorber." for Breathing Apparatus
- 1957 US 2781043 "Oxygen Admission Valve." for Oxygen Rebreathing Apparatus
- 1959 US 2871854 "Breathing Apparatus." for use Under Water
- 1974 US 3794021 "Dual Mode Mixed Gas Breathing Apparatus."
- 1974 US 3851487 "Buoyant Underwater Structures." for Underwater Work and Oil Trapping
- 1989 US 4807706 "Breathable Fire Extinguishing Gas Mixtures."

== See also ==
- Scuba diving – Swimming underwater, breathing gas carried by the diver
- Rebreather – Portable apparatus to recycle breathing gas
- Isobaric counterdiffusion – Gaseous diffusion through body tissue at constant total pressure
- Underwater demolition – Deliberate destruction of underwater obstacles
