= Catalina Island Marine Institute =

US non-profit educational program

Coordinates: 33.3738°N 118.3563°W

- Founded: 1985
- Type: 501(c)(3)
- Purpose: Protecting the southern California coastline and the surrounding watersheds.
- Location: Santa Monica, California, U.S.
- Method: environmental advocacy, Research and Education
- Website: healthebay.org

The Catalina Island Marine Institute (CIMI) is a non-profit educational program founded in 1979 and run by Guided Discoveries on Santa Catalina Island, California.

It is the host to approximately 15,000 students a year, who visit it in school-organized trips and summer camps. Students at CIMI learn marine biology through activities such snorkeling, scuba diving, sailing, hiking, marine science labs, kayaking and squid dissections.

CIMI operates out of three facilities on Catalina Island: Toyon Bay (A private beach three miles northwest of Avalon, also known as Whites Landing), Fox Landing (Slightly north of Whites Landing), and Cherry Cove (a camp owned by the Boy Scouts of America).
