= Dean Brelis =

American journalist

- Born: Constantinos Christos Brelis; April 1, 1924; Newport, Rhode Island
- Died: November 17, 2006 (aged 82); Santa Monica, California
- Education: Harvard University (B.A.)
- Occupation: Foreign Correspondent
- Writing career
- Notable works: Behind the Burma Road; The face of South Vietnam

Dean Brelis (April 1, 1924 – November 17, 2006) was a journalist who worked as a foreign correspondent for NBC, CBS and Time magazine and wrote novels and nonfiction books. He was born Constantinos Christos Brelis in Newport, Rhode Island to Greek immigrant parents. He enlisted in the Army in 1942 and was assigned to work in military intelligence for the OSS Detachment 101 under the command of William R. Peers, first as a sergeant and then as a lieutenant, during 1944 and 1945. While stationed in Burma, he received a Bronze Star.

After World War II he attended Harvard, earning a bachelor's degree in 1949, and began his journalism career writing for the Boston Globe. He worked as a correspondent for Time-Life from 1949 to 1954, then in 1958 published his first novel, "The Mission," which was loosely based on his experiences in Burma. Two more novels followed: "Shalom" (1959) and "My New-Found Land" (1963). Brelis authored another book about his experiences in Burma, this time collaborating with Peers to pen "Behind the Burma Road: The Story of America’s Most Successful Guerrilla Force" (1963). In his last book, "The face of South Vietnam", he collaborated with photographer, Jill Krementz.

In the early 1960s he joined NBC, filing dispatches from the Middle East, North Africa, Cyprus and Vietnam before anchoring the KNBC-TV Channel 4 nightly news in Los Angeles in 1967. He worked with CBS News, and then in 1974 Brelis returned to Time as a foreign correspondent in the Middle East, South Asia and Southeast Asia, retiring in 1988.

== Books ==
- The Mission. Panther, 1959.
- Shalom. Atlantic Monthly Press, 1959
- My New Found Land. Hodder & Stoughton, 1963.
- Peers, William R. and Dean Brelis. Behind the Burma Road: The Story of America’s Most Successful Guerrilla Force. Boston: Little, Brown & Co., 1963.
- Brelis, Dean, Photographs by Jill Krementz. The face of South Vietnam. Houghton Mifflin, 1968.
