= Marcel Petiot =

French serial killer (1897-1946)

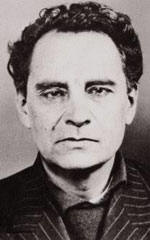
- Petiot in 1944
- Born: 17 January 1897; Auxerre, Yonne, France
- Died: 25 May 1946 (aged 49); La Santé Prison, Paris, France
- Cause of death: Execution by guillotine
- Resting place: Cimetière parisien d'Ivry
- Other names: "Captain Valery" "Docteur Satan"
- Occupation: General practitioner
- Spouse: Georgette Lablais (m. 1927)
- Parent(s): Félix Petiot and Marthe Bourdon
- Status: Executed
- Motive: Financial gain
- Conviction: Murder (26 counts)
- Penalty: Death

Details
- Victims: 27–63+
- Date: 1942–1944
- Country: German-occupied France
- State: Seine
- Location: Paris
- Targets: People seeking safe passage (mainly Jews, partisans, and common criminals)
- Weapon: Poison (by injection of cyanide)
- Date apprehended: 31 October 1944

Marcel André Henri Félix Petiot (French: [maʁsɛl pətjo]; 17 January 1897 – 25 May 1946) was a French medical doctor and serial killer. He was convicted of multiple murders of Jews after the discovery of the remains of 23 people in the basement of his home in Paris during World War II. He is suspected of the murder of about 60 to 200 mostly Jewish victims during his lifetime, although the true number remains unknown. During the Nazi occupation of France in World War II, Petiot set up a fake escape network under the name “Dr. Eugène.” He claimed he could help Jews and others wanted by the Gestapo flee to South America via Portugal, for a large fee. He lured his victims to his home at 21 Rue Le Sueur in Paris, promising them safety. Instead, he murdered them—often by injecting them with poison under the pretense of giving them vaccinations—and then stole their valuables and disposed of their bodies, frequently by burning them.

Despite showing early signs of mental illness and criminal behaviour, Petiot served in the First World War, graduated from an accelerated medical program, and began a dubious medical career that included performing abortions and supplying narcotics. His political career was marked by scandal, theft, and corruption. Captured in 1944, Petiot claimed to be a Resistance hero who killed only the enemies of France. He was convicted of 26 counts of murder and was executed by guillotine in 1946. His life and crimes have been depicted in film and comic books.

== Early life ==
Marcel Petiot was born on 17 January 1897 in Auxerre, Yonne, in north central France. During his teenage years, he robbed a postbox and was charged with damage to public property and theft. Petiot was ordered to undergo a psychiatric evaluation, resulting in charges being dismissed when it was judged that he had a mental illness.

Later accounts make various claims of Petiot's delinquency and criminal acts during his youth, but it is unknown whether they were invented afterwards for public consumption. A psychiatrist reaffirmed Petiot's mental illness on 26 March 1914. After being expelled from school many times, he finished his education in a special academy in Paris in July 1915.

Petiot volunteered for the French Army in World War I, entering service in January 1916. He was wounded and gassed in the Second Battle of the Aisne, and exhibited more symptoms of a mental breakdown. Petiot was sent to various rest homes, where he was arrested for stealing army blankets, morphine, and other army supplies, as well as wallets, photographs, and letters; he was jailed in Orléans. In a psychiatric hospital in Fleury-les-Aubrais, Petiot was again diagnosed with various mental illnesses but was returned to the front in June 1918. He was transferred three weeks later after he allegedly injured his foot with a grenade, but was attached to a new regiment in September. A new diagnosis was enough to get him discharged with a disability pension.

== Medical and political career ==
After the war, Petiot entered the accelerated education program intended for war veterans, completed medical school in eight months, and became an intern at the mental hospital in Évreux. He received his medical degree in December 1921 and relocated to Villeneuve-sur-Yonne, where he received payment for his services both from the patients and from government medical assistance funds. At this time Petiot was already using addictive narcotics. While working at Villeneuve-sur-Yonne, he gained a reputation for dubious medical practices, such as supplying narcotics and performing illegal abortions, as well as for petty theft.

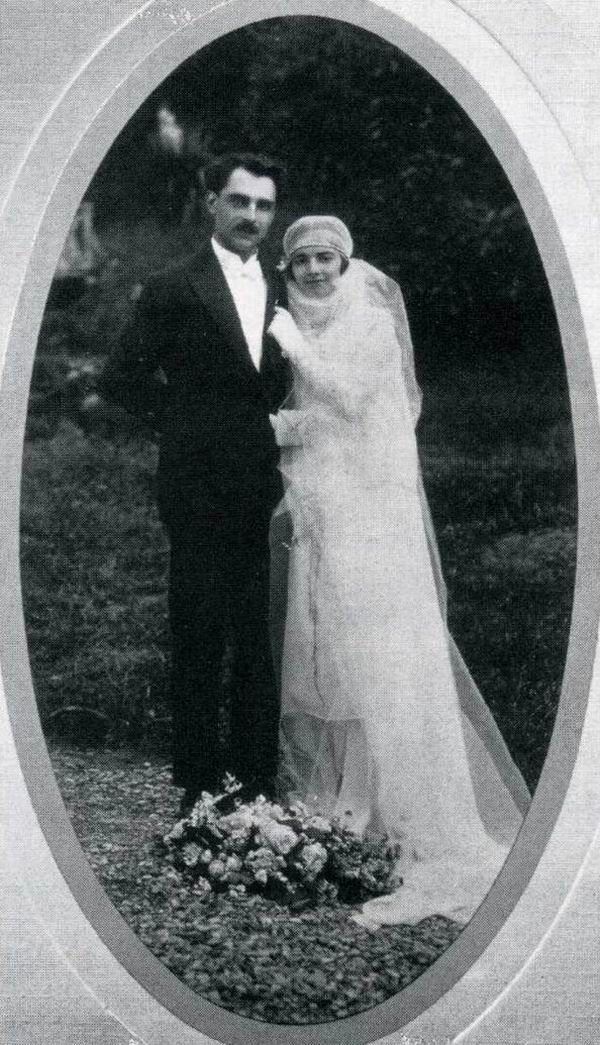
Wedding photo - Marcel Petiot and Georgette Lablais, 1927

Petiot's first murder victim might have been Louise Delaveau, an elderly patient's daughter with whom Petiot had an affair in 1926. Delaveau disappeared during May of that year, and neighbours later said they had seen Petiot load a trunk into his car. Police investigated but eventually dismissed her case as a runaway. That same year, Petiot campaigned for mayor of Villeneuve-sur-Yonne and hired somebody to disrupt a political debate with his opponent. He won, and while in office embezzled town funds. The next year, Petiot married Georgette Lablais, the 23-year-old daughter of a wealthy landowner and butcher in Seignelay. Their son Gerhardt was born in April 1928.

The prefect of Yonne received many complaints about Petiot's thefts and dubious financial dealings. He was eventually suspended as mayor in August 1931 and resigned. However, Petiot still had many supporters, and the village council also resigned in sympathy with him. Five weeks later, on 18 October, he was elected as a councillor of Yonne Département. In 1932, he was accused of stealing electricity from the village and lost his council seat. By this time he had already relocated to Paris.

In Paris, Petiot attracted patients by using fake credentials, and built an impressive reputation for his practice at 66 Rue de Caumartin. However, there were rumours of illegal abortions and excessive prescriptions of addictive remedies. In 1936, Petiot was appointed médecin d'état-civil, with authority to write death certificates. The same year, he was institutionalized briefly for kleptomania, but was released the next year. He persisted in tax evasion.

== World War II activities ==
After the 1940 German defeat of France, French citizens were drafted for forced labour in Germany. Petiot provided false medical disability certificates to people who were drafted. He also treated the illnesses of workers who had returned. In July 1942, he was convicted of overprescribing narcotics, even though two addicts who would have testified against him had disappeared. He was fined 2,400 francs.

Petiot later claimed that during the period of German occupation, he was engaged in Resistance activities. He supposedly developed secret weapons that killed Germans without leaving forensic evidence, planted booby traps all over Paris, had high-level meetings with Allied commanders, and worked with a (nonexistent) group of Spanish anti-fascists.

There is no evidence for any of these statements. However, in 1980, he was cited by former U.S. spymaster Col. John F. Grombach as a World War II source. Grombach had been founder and commander of a small independent espionage agency, known later as "The Pond" that operated from 1942 to 1955. Grombach asserted that Petiot had reported the Katyn Forest massacre, German missile development at Peenemünde, and the names of Abwehr agents sent to the U.S. While these claims were not corroborated by any records of other intelligence services, in 2001, some "Pond" records were discovered, including a cable that mentioned Petiot.

== Fraudulent escape network ==
Petiot's most lucrative activity during the Occupation was his false escape route. Using the codename "Dr. Eugène," Petiot pretended to have a means of getting people wanted by the Germans or the Vichy government to safety outside France. Petiot claimed that he could arrange a passage to Argentina or elsewhere in South America through Portugal, for a price of 25,000 francs per person. Three accomplices, Raoul Fourrier, Edmond Pintard, and René-Gustave Nézondet directed victims to "Dr. Eugène," including Jews, Resistance fighters, and ordinary criminals. Once victims were in his control, Petiot told them that Argentine officials required all entrants to the country to be inoculated against disease and with this excuse injected them with cyanide. He then took all their valuables and disposed of the bodies.

At first, Petiot dumped the bodies in the Seine, but later he destroyed bodies by submerging them in quicklime or incinerating them. In 1941, Petiot bought a house at 21 Rue le Sueur, near the Arc de Triomphe. He purchased the house the same week that Henri Lafont returned to Paris with money and permission from the Abwehr to recruit new members for the French Gestapo.

The Gestapo eventually learned about this "route" for the escape of wanted persons, which they assumed was part of the Resistance. Gestapo agent Robert Jodkum forced prisoner Yvan Dreyfus to approach the supposed network, but Dreyfus simply vanished. A later informer successfully infiltrated the operation and the Gestapo arrested Fourrier, Pintard, and Nézondet. During the torture, they confessed that "Dr. Eugène" was Marcel Petiot.

Nézondet was later released, but three others spent eight months in prison, suspected of helping Jews to escape. Even during torture, they did not identify any other members of the Resistance because they didn't know any. The Gestapo released the three men in January 1944.

== Discovery of murders ==
On 11 March 1944, Petiot's neighbours in Rue Le Sueur complained to police about a foul stench in the area and large volumes of smoke billowing from a chimney of the house. Fearing a chimney fire, the police summoned firemen, who entered the house and found a great fire in a coal stove in the basement. In the fire, and scattered in the basement, were human remains.

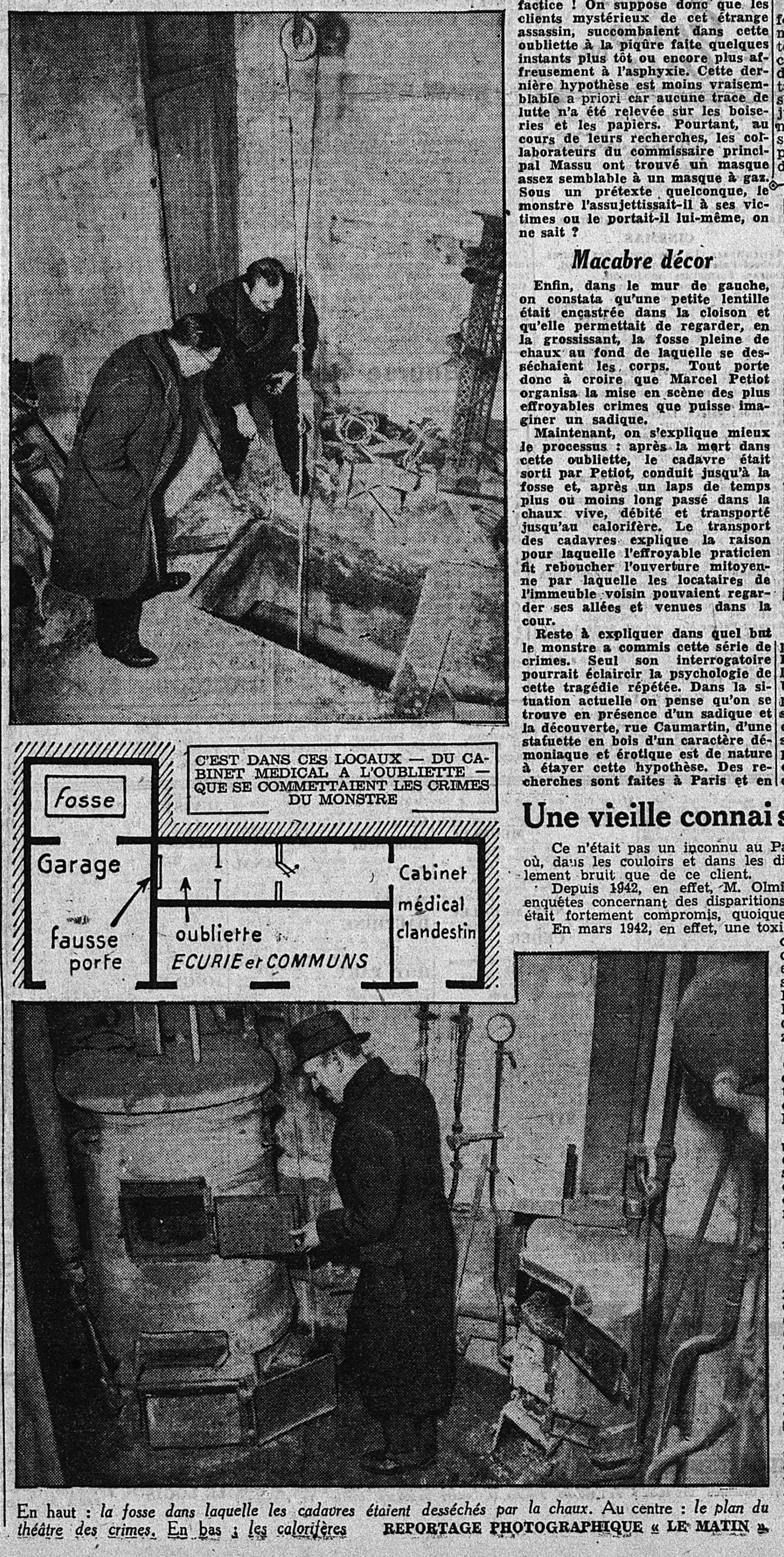
Article of newspaper Le Matin for 14 March 1944, reporting the discovery of 21 Rue Le Sueur.

In addition to those found in his basement, human remains were also found in a pit filled partly with quicklime in the backyard and in a canvas bag. In his home, enough body parts were found to account for at least ten victims. Also scattered throughout his property were suitcases, clothing, and assorted property of his victims: 72 suitcases and 655 kilos of miscellaneous objects, including 1,760 pieces of clothing, including: 21 woollen coats, 90 dresses, 120 skirts, 26 handbags, 28 men's suits, 33 ties, 57 pairs of socks, 43 pairs of shoes, and a pair of children's pyjamas belonging to the young René Kneller, who disappeared with his parents. The list of his victims has not been finalized. According to the Judicial Police in 1944, the following names were identified: Joachim Guschino, Jean-Marie Van Biver, Marthe Khait, Bertholomus, Annette Petit, Joseph Reocreux, Maurice Wolff, Lucie Braun, Rachel Marx, Joséphine Grippay, Joseph Pieruchi, Adrien Estebeteguy, Gisèle Rossmy, Ivan Dreyfus, Claudia Chamoux, François Albertini, Marie Scheuker, Siegfried Bosch, Ludwika Hollaner, Ludwig Krusberg, Chaim Sckouker, Franzeslaw Ehrenreich.

The media reaction was an intense media circus, with news reaching Switzerland, Belgium, and Scandinavia.

== Evasion and capture ==
During the intervening seven months, Petiot hid with friends, claiming that the Gestapo wanted him because he had killed Germans and informers. He eventually began living with a patient, Georges Redouté, let his beard grow, and adopted various aliases.

During the liberation of Paris in 1944, Petiot adopted the name "Henri Valéry" and joined the French Forces of the Interior (FFI) in the uprising. He became a captain in charge of counter-espionage and prisoner interrogations.

When the newspaper Résistance published an article about Petiot, his defence attorney from the 1942 narcotics case received a letter in which his fugitive client claimed that the published allegations were mere lies. This gave the police a hint that Petiot was still in Paris. The search began anew – with "Henri Valéry" among those who were drafted to find him. Finally, on 31 October, Petiot was recognized at a Paris Métro station, and arrested. Among his possessions were a pistol, 31,700 francs, and 50 sets of identity documents.

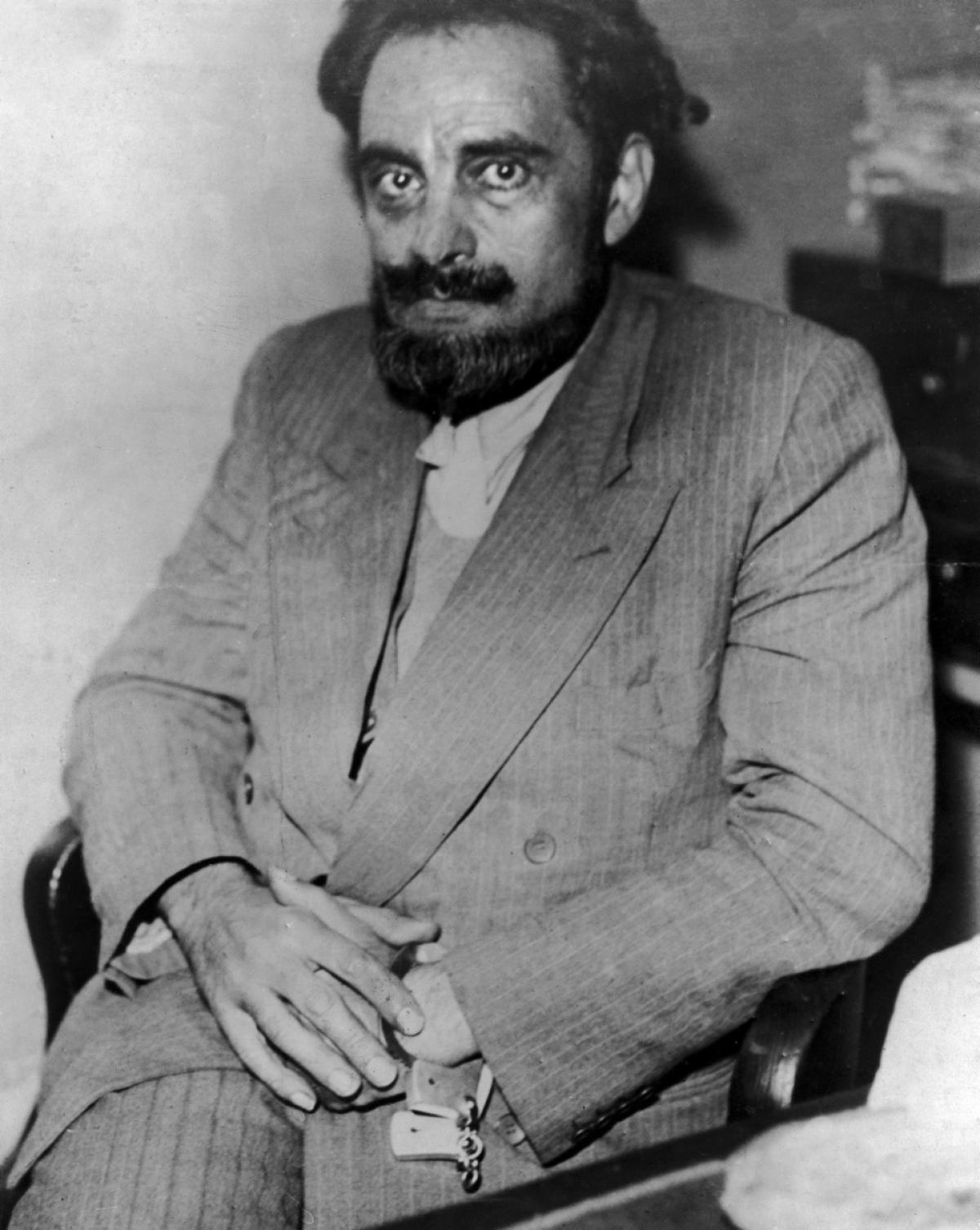
Marcel Petiot bearded under the identity of "Captain Valéry", photographed after his arrest at the end of October 1944.

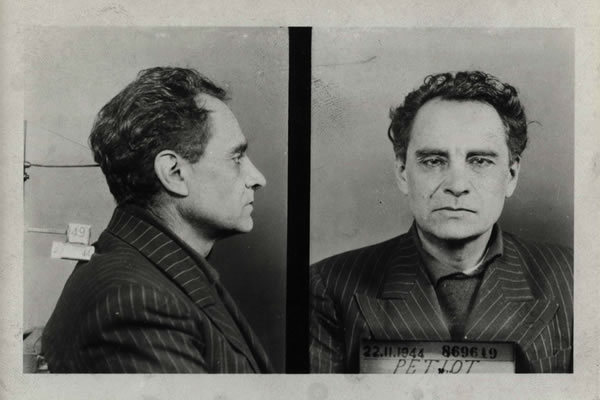
Mugshot of docteur Petiot, 22 November 1944.

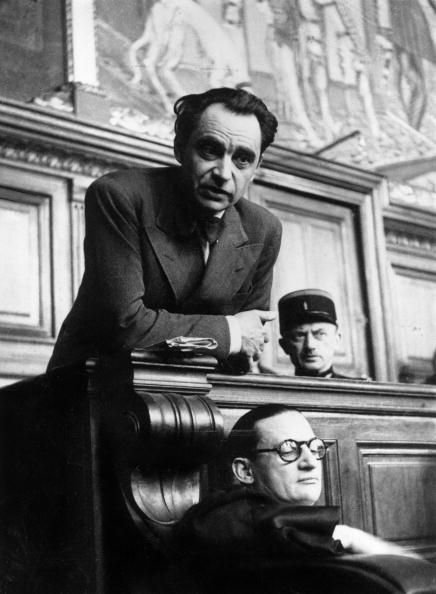
Lawyer René Floriot and his client Marcel Petiot during the trial, 1946.

The investigation brought to light the complicity of his brother Maurice, a shopkeeper on rue du Pont in Auxerre; of his wife Georgette; of his daughter-in-law and mistress Léonie Arnaux; and Albert Neuhausen, a bicycle dealer in Courson-les-Carrières, in whose home suitcases were found. While Dr. Petiot's wife and Albert Neuhausen were accused of receiving stolen goods and his brother Maurice of manslaughter, the investigating judge Ferdinand Gollety, who had completed his investigation, issued a dismissal order in their favor.

== Trial and sentence ==
Petiot was imprisoned in La Santé Prison. He claimed that he was innocent and that he had killed only enemies of France. He said that he had discovered the pile of bodies in 21 Rue le Sueur in February 1944, but had assumed that they were collaborators killed by members of his Resistance "network".

However, the police found that Petiot had no friends in any of the major Resistance groups. Some of the Resistance groups he spoke of had never existed, and there was no proof of any of his claimed exploits. Prosecutors eventually charged him with at least 27 murders for profit. Their estimate of his gains was as much as 200 million francs.

Petiot was tried on 19 March 1946, accused of 135 criminal charges. Celebrity attorney René Floriot acted for the defence, against a team comprising state prosecutors and twelve civil lawyers hired by relatives of Petiot's victims. Petiot taunted the prosecuting lawyers and claimed that various victims had been collaborators or double agents, or that vanished people were alive and well in South America using new names. He admitted to killing 19 of the 27 victims found in his house, and claimed that they were Germans and collaborators – part of a total of 63 "enemies" killed. Floriot attempted to portray Petiot as a Resistance hero, but the judges and jurors were unimpressed. Petiot was convicted of 26 counts of murder, and sentenced to death.

On 25 May 1946, Petiot was beheaded, after a stay of a few days due to a problem with the release mechanism of the guillotine, and buried at Ivry Cemetery. His son Gerhardt Petiot died on September 22, 2011, at the age of 83.

== See also ==
- Carlingue
- John Bodkin Adams
- Thomas Neill Cream
- Hawley Harvey Crippen
- H. H. Holmes
- William Palmer (murderer)
- Maxim Petrov
- Harold Shipman
- Michael Swango
- List of serial killers by number of victims

== Bibliography ==
- Grombach, John (1980). The Great Liquidator. Garden City, NY: Doubleday.
- Kershaw, Alister (1955). Murder in France. London: Constable.
- King, David (2011). Death in the City of Light: The Serial Killer of Nazi-Occupied Paris. Crown. ISBN 978-0-307-45289-4.
- Maeder, Thomas (1980). The Unspeakable Crimes of Dr. Petiot. Boston: Little, Brown and Co.
- Seth, Ronald (1963). Petiot: Victim of Chance. London: Hutchinson.
- Tomlins Marilyn Z. (2013) Die in Paris, Raven Crest Books, London: ISBN 9781482752809
