= Eifler =

Eifler is a surname. Notable people with the surname include:

- Brian S. Eifler (born 1968), U.S. Army officer
- Carl F. Eifler (1906–2002), American police officer and U.S. Army officer
- Erna Eifler (1908–1944), German resistance member
- Larissa Eifler (born 1999), German fencer
- Milo Eifler (born 1998), American football player
