= Robert Solberg =

Soldier and spy (1892–1979)

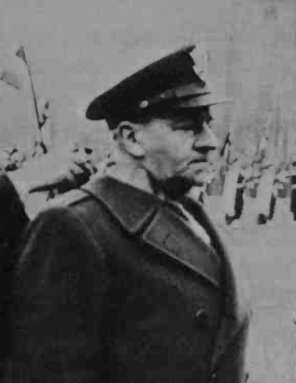

U.S. Military Attaché in Brussels
- In office 1945–1948
- President: Harry S. Truman

U.S. Military Attaché in Lisbon
- In office 1942–1944

Chief of Special Operations of COI
- In office 9 October 1941 – February 1942
- President: Franklin D. Roosevelt
- Preceded by: Office Established
- Succeeded by: Millard Preston Goodfellow

U.S. Military Attaché in Paris
- In office 1917–?

Personal details
- Born: 18 February 1892 Warsaw, Warsaw Governorate, Russian Empire
- Died: March 1979 (aged 87)
- Education: Leipzig University; Sorbonne University

Military service
- Allegiance: Russian Empire (1910s–1917); United States (1917–1948)
- Branch/service: Imperial Russian Army; United States Army; Army Reserve; Military Intelligence Division; Office of the Coordinator of Information; Office of Strategic Services
- Years of service: 1910s–1917 1917–1919 (active); 1919–1940 (reserve); 1940–1948 (active)
- Rank: Lieutenant Colonel
- Battles/wars: World War I; World War II; Operation Torch

Robert A. Solberg (Solborg) was a soldier and spy during World War I and World War II, becoming a key figure in the development of the Office of the Coordinator of Information and the Office of Strategic Services, precursor to the Central Intelligence Agency.

He served as an officer in the Czar's Army in World War I, fled Russia after the Russian Civil War, and performed espionage work for the British while acting undercover as an international businessman in the interwar period, at the order of the Americans Millard Preston Goodfellow and the G-2.

== Early life ==
Solberg was born in Warsaw, Poland, the son of a Polish General of the Czar's Army who served on the staff of the Russian Governor-General of Poland.

He attended Leipzig University and Sorbonne University, where he attained a PhD in international law.

== World War I and Bolshevik Revolution ==
Solberg was a commissioned officer in the Czar's cavalry, where he was wounded severely on the battlefield in 1916. After recovering, he was sent to New York City to purchase supplies for the Russian military. He was on this mission in New York when the Bolsheviks revolted in Russia.

His country no longer existed, and he learned that the Communists had executed most of his fellow comrades. Solberg, now a stateless person, applied for American citizenship and enlisted in the United States Army. Solberg was sent to Paris to serve as a military attaché.

When the war ended, Solberg joined the Armco Steel Company. By the end of the Interwar Years, Solberg was the managing director of Armco Steel in Britain and France.

== World War II ==
In 1939 and 1940, Solberg traveled to Germany using his business as official cover for the British to observe production lines and factory assemblies there. In December 1940, Solberg joined Army Intelligence and spent eight months in North Africa under his Armco cover, contacting French resistance fighters there. Early in 1941, the U.S. Army's Military Intelligence Division gave him a commission as a lieutenant colonel.

In May 1941, Solberg was the lead COI officer in charge of securing intelligences against Axis elements within Vichy France and Axis occupied North Africa.

When William Donovan created the Office of the Coordinator of Information (COI), Goodfellow and others at Army Intelligence recommended Solberg for developing a newly invented curriculum for what would be called Special Operations.

On 9 October 1941, Solberg was made the inaugural Chief of the newly established Special Operations (SO), or the “L” branch of the COI, which was the organization’s guerrilla warfighting branch. However, the United States had no such organization, so at the end of the month, Solberg was sent to England to observe and train with the British Special Operations Executive.

Solberg was training with the SOE when the Japanese attacked Pearl Harbor, but stayed to finish his training through the end of December. In the heyday that followed, William Donovan created a new branch of the COI which would collect Secret Intelligence (SI). Upon his return to Washington, Solberg came to an administrative loggerheads with Donovan. Solberg believed that as the Director of SO, he should be responsible for what was now being called SO and SI activities at COI - In February 1942, Donovan relieved him of command, and sent him to the American embassy in Lisbon, Portugal.

Millard Preston Goodfellow was now placed in charge of SA/G, the SO branch, and David K. E. Bruce was placed in charge of SA/B, the SI branch.

While Solberg was in Lisbon, the COI was dissolved and shuttered. The new organization that took its place would be called the Office of Strategic Services (OSS), which was formed in June 1942.

Around the same time, Solberg went to Casablanca to work with Robert Murphy and his diplomatic staff in negotiating with the local French forces and General Giraud, who promised a fifth column that would be allied to American forces in an invasion of North Africa.

However, Solberg’s mission in Africa was not approved - he had not informed anyone at OSS about his trip, and had defied direct orders by going to the continent. Because of this, Donovan threw Solberg out of the OSS. Solberg’s life in espionage was effectively ended.

However, historian Nigel West writes that Solberg "was exceptionally indiscreet and, according to ARTIST, a British source in the local Abwehr, was the sole source of leaks to the Germans." Donovan was notorious for hearing all rumors during the war.

Solberg remained at his post in Lisbon, but now acting only as the Army Attaché to Portugal.

== Later life ==
From 1945 to 1948, Solberg served as the U.S. Military Attaché in Brussels.

In 1948, he returned to Armco Steel as President of its European branch, where he remained until retiring in 1959.

Afterward, he worked as an investment adviser for a Canadian investment firm in Paris, Industrial Estates Limited of Nova Scotia. He was President of the American Chamber of Commerce in France from 1951 to 1956.

It is possible that Solberg remained in the intelligence business as "Rene Solborg," the American contact for the Belgian spymaster André Moyen.
