= Millard Preston Goodfellow =

American journalist, publisher and diplomat (1892–1973)

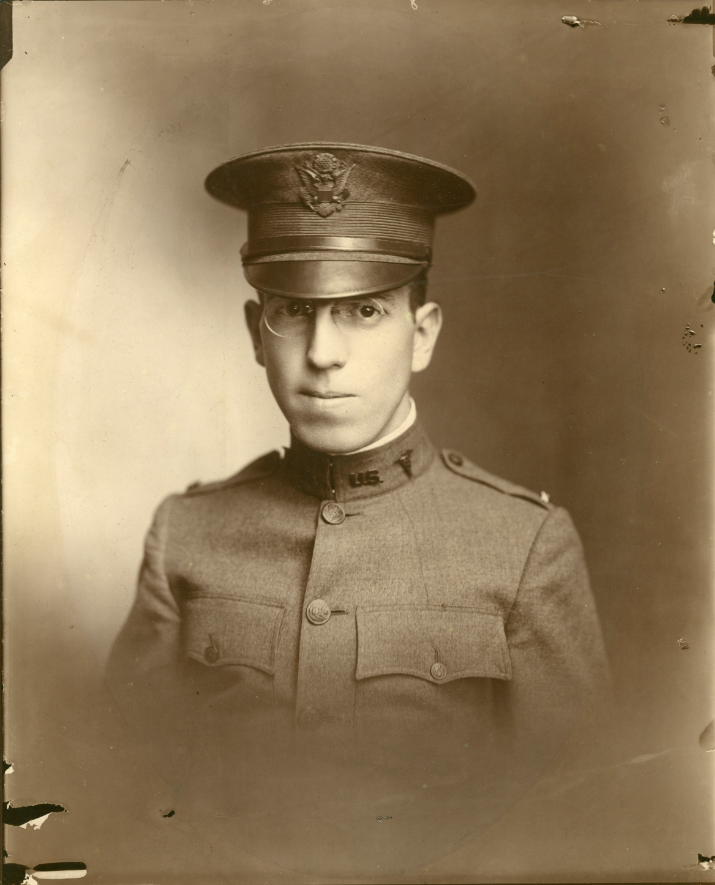

Assistant Director of the Office of Strategic Services
- In office 1942–1945
- President: Harry S. Truman

Chief of the Special Operations Branch of OSS
- In office 1942–1945
- Preceded by: Himself
- Succeeded by: Office Abolished

Chief of Special Activities/Goodfellow of COI
- In office 1941–1942
- Preceded by: Robert Solberg
- Succeeded by: Office Abolished

Deputy Coordinator of the Office of the Coordinator of Information
- In office 1941–1942

Personal details
- Born: Millard Preston Goodfellow; May 22, 1892 Brooklyn, New York, US
- Died: September 5, 1973 (aged 81) Washington, D.C., US
- Resting place: Arlington National Cemetery
- Spouse: Florence Searle Haeussler
- Children: Alice Goodfellow Guyaz; Millard Preston Goodfellow, Jr.
- Education: Virginia Military Institute (BA)
- Alma mater: New York University, Degree in Journalism
- Awards: Order of the British Empire (Honorary); Order of Polonia Restituta (Chevalier); Officer's Cross; Order of the Crown of Italy (Commander)
- Nicknames: "G"; "Jolly Goodfellow"; Father of modern Special Operations

Military service
- Allegiance: United States
- Branch/service: United States Army; Army Reserve; Office of the Coordinator of Information; Office of Strategic Services
- Years of service: 1916–1918 (active); 1918–1941 (reserve); 1941–1950s (active)
- Rank: Colonel
- Unit: Signal Corps; G-2; Detachment 101
- Commands: Assistant, G-2; Director, COI Service Command; Co-Creator, Operational Group Command
- Battles/wars: Mexican Border War; World War I; World War II; Operation Jedburgh; Tolstoy-Dolan; Free Thai; Eifler; Operation Hoskins; Operation Carpetbagger; Operation Torch; Operation Market Garden; Cold War; Korean War

Millard Preston Goodfellow, who often went by the name "Preston Goodfellow," was an American soldier, spy, diplomat, journalist, war correspondent, and newspaper publisher. A veteran of World War I, Goodfellow became a leading figure at the Office of the Coordinator of Information and the Office of Strategic Services during World War II.

Goodfellow was a publisher of the Brooklyn Eagle, Pocatello Tribune, and the New York American. During the Korean War, he acted as Special Adviser to President Syngman Rhee, mediating on behalf of the State Department and Central Intelligence Agency between Rhee and Kim Ku. Goodfellow died in Washington, DC, in 1973, at age 81.

== Early life ==
Goodfellow was born and raised in Brooklyn, which was an independent city and was not yet a borough of New York City. For five summers as a child, he spent time in the wilderness of the Adirondacks, learning how to ride a horse and camp in the woods.

He graduated from Public School Number 122. He also studied at the Commercial High School, and under private tutors.

Goodfellow entered the newspaper business at the age of fourteen as a copyboy, and was a seasoned reporter before graduating high school.

== Journalist and newspaper publisher ==
Goodfellow graduated New York University with a degree in journalism.

By the year 1916, aged 24, Goodfellow had been in the journalism business for a decade, and most of that time was at The Brooklyn Times, except for six months at the Brooklyn Eagle and a year at the Evening Mail.

Mexican Border War

The Brooklyn Times sent him to the Mexican border to be a war correspondent during the Mexican Border War, where he also wrote for The New York Times and the Evening Mail. As was standard for all war correspondents at the time, Goodfellow took a commission as a 2nd Lieutenant, and each of his reports from the war were made in his role as an officer and under the authority of the Army.

When the Times sent him to the border, they stated in their paper that he was:

"...without superior as a gatherer of facts and a chronicler of events... He is a Brooklyn man who knows the borough as few know it."

As to the manner of his reporting, Goodfellow, while embedded with the First Cavalry and the Fourteenth Infantry in McAllen, Texas, wrote reports from the field that were sometimes extremely humorous, but always detailed, such as the following observation on a friendly fire situation:

“…Lieut. Dudley B. Howard, of Company C, of the frolicsome Fourteenth, came within handshake of sudden death yesterday. For several minutes he was under a spray of bullets from a company of Texas militia who were at target practice. A sharp order from the commanding officer stopped the firing, and the marksmen rested while Lieut. Howard stalked majestically down the field to the canal leading the mangy old mascot goat.

‘It is for a christening we are bound,’ he explained to his horror-stricken officers, ‘and those exuberant Texans thought they would give us a baptism of fire. Do you think they were trying to get my goat?’ ”

— M. Preston Goodfellow, July 08, 1916, Brooklyn Times

World War I

During World War I, Goodfellow served in the US Army Signal Corps as a 2nd Lieutenant. Later in the war, he was assigned to the office of the Assistant Chief of Staff for Intelligence (G-2).

When WWI ended, Goodfellow retained his commission in the US Army Reserves.

Interwar period

In the interwar years, Goodfellow continued his rise in the journalism industry, returning to work at the Brooklyn Eagle as circulation director and then advertising manager. He moved to the New York American for a short while as assistant publisher.

In 1932, he returned to the Brooklyn Eagle, entering into a co-ownership of the newspaper and acquiring the title of Publisher.

Goodfellow soon became a member of the New York elite. He would attend society dinners with Al Smith (Mayor of New York City), Orie R. Reilly (Chairman of the New York Athletic Club), descendants of Walt Whitman (former editor of the Eagle), Richard Hageman and others.

Goodfellow's wife, Florence, was an active member of women's groups, such as the Committee for Brooklyn Women's Day at the New York World's Fair.

During this time, he was also the President and Director of the Brooklyn Publishing Company, the B.D.E. Broadcasting Company, and B.D.E. Properties Corporation, and the Tri-County Publishing Corporation.

On 1 August 1938, after a workers' strike organized by the Newspaper Guild, Goodfellow sold his stake in the Brooklyn Eagle to Frank D. Schroth. He formed his own business, "M.P. Goodfellow and Co."

== Early World War II and the intelligence community ==
1941 Interwar Years

In the Summer of 1941, Goodfellow was recalled back into active service, now a Major in the US Army, he was reassigned to G-2 in Washington, DC. While stationed at G-2, Goodfellow encountered William Donovan (Wild Bill), who discussed with Goodfellow the idea of an entirely new civilian structure to be responsible for strategic operations, and Goodfellow approved. The two men were quick friends.

Reports conflict on when Goodfellow first met John Grombach, but by all accounts, Goodfellow thought very highly of him at this time.

At this time, Goodfellow was already responsible for the deployments of soldiers and marines to the Far East, North Africa, and Europe to monitor the unfolding situation of the Axis powers. Men that Goodfellow and his staff at G-2 were in strategic planning command of undercover deployments include;

- Robert Solberg to North Africa
- Lieutenant Colonel Warren J. Clear to the Far East and the Philippines (who narrowly escaped the Japanese invasion in a submarine, and had to recall his mission report from memory after his plane was shot down)
- David W. King
- Stafford Reid
- Kenneth Pendar
- Leland Rounds

Goodfellow took a much more involved role in building Donovan's brainchild, the Office of the Coordinator of Information, and in September 1941, Goodfellow officially assumed Liaison status between Donovan and the G-2.

In October 1941, Goodfellow became the Director of the newly established Special Activities/Goodfellow (SA/G), replacing the duties of Robert Solberg at COI. Another unit called Special Activities/Bruce (SA/B), was led by David K. E. Bruce.

US enters World War Two

In December 1941 with the Japanese attack on Pearl Harbor, the United States officially entered the war, providing for Goodfellow and Donovan the opportunity to deploy uniformed soldiers, no longer having to rely entirely on undercover operations. Goodfellow, Bruce, and Donovan collaborated to create the first Operational Groups (OGs), which were special warfare guerrilla units, then still under the auspices of the structure of the COI. They selected Camp X, a training camp run by the Special Operations Executive (SOE), to be the site where these early operators would train.

In January 1942, Goodfellow was instrumental in negotiating with the National Park Service to dedicate swathes of land as three new training camps for members of SA/G and SA/B, and developing the training curriculum for OSS operators and officers. Primarily, Goodfellow used a team of War Department inspectors to condemn the properties, and then approached NPS with a deal: OSS would only pay a dollar a year in lease, if they agreed to keep the place clean while they were occupying it.

In February 1942, Goodfellow recruited Garland H. Williams from the Federal Bureau of Narcotics as Director of Training. Williams used his SOE training experience at Camp X as a model for his curriculum.

On 23 February 1942, Goodfellow was placed in charge of the newly activated COI Service Command, and a staff of 51 officers.

Goodfellow created a mission that would be called Detachment 101, which was "the first American unit ever assembled to conduct guerrilla warfare, espionage and sabotage behind enemy lines," and in April 1942, Donovan activated the unit.

== Radio stations and John Grombach ==
Goodfellow and John "Frenchy" Grombach were good friends from New York before the war. Goodfellow had been given a directive by Donovan to establish a communications network for COI. Grombach was in the Radio business before the war, which gave him an intricate knowledge of the inner workings of radio station operations. Goodfellow recruited Grombach into the COI to help him establish the network.

Grombach was indispensable to Goodfellow in building this network. Together, they built a radio intelligence program of collection, decryption, and analysis for the COI in Washington. Later, they expanded to a larger center in New York. Grombach established the Foreign Broadcast Quarterly (FBQ), which was the front alias for the communications center, and COI purchased NBC's Long Island radio station.

Donovan grew distrustful of Grombach. In one memo addressed to Goodfellow, Donovan wrote: "...do not use Grombach!" In another memo, Donovan wrote: "I am disturbed by this talk of Grombach... It is clearly not evident to you, but I am told by all sides that he talks too much."

It was true that there were leaks of FBQ's operation within the government.

Donovan had caught wind of three things: that Grombach was planning to build a Black Chamber in New York, that Grombach had married a woman without vetting her for security clearance before giving her an assistant director role in the FBQ, and that Grombach had already been recruited by Donovan's rival General George Strong and the State Department to help build a competing agency to COI within the Military Intelligence Service that would come to be called The Pond.

Donovan had Grombach dismissed from COI in May 1942, beginning Grombach's spiral of hatred and distrust toward Donovan and the COI, but Goodfellow would still continue to occasionally use him as an undercover operative throughout the war.

The FBQ, however, was also dismantled in May when Donovan's rivals convinced President Roosevelt to order the COI to relinquish control over any communications efforts and propaganda. This abruptly forced the dissolution of the COI.

== Office of Strategic Services ==
In June 1942, the COI was restructured into the newly established Office of Strategic Services (OSS). SA/G became the Special Operations Branch (SO), with the staff being divided between Goodfellow and Lieutenant Colonel Ellery C. Huntington, Jr. SA/B became the Secret Intelligence Branch.

In August 1942, Goodfellow officially left his duties at G-2, and transferred to COI, now finally able to dedicate all of his efforts into the new agency and Special Operations. Prior to this, he was simultaneously Chief of the Contact and Liaison Section of G-2, Director of SA/G, and G-2 liaison to OSS.

Around this time, with Huntington being named as a Director of SO, the original staff of Goodfellow's SO and the staff of Huntington's SO formed what official reports called a "bitter rivalry." The rivalry between the two units persisted when Huntington was deployed to Europe.

At this point in the war, the OSS Assessment Unit had not yet been established, and recruiting for the organization was performed irrespective of assignment. Goodfellow was a prolific recruiter, but the exact number of persons he recruited into the agency is still unknown.

Memos to Donovan that were declassified by the CIA in 2023 read:

"Two kinds of men then recruited by Goodfellow –
Those with quality of initiative to carry on individual missions.
Those chosen because they had the physical and psychological stamina to act as members of guerrilla forces."

Officers and operators recruited into OSS by Goodfellow at this time include;

- Captain Eifler
- Captain Coughlin
- Sergeant Vincent Curl
- Lieutenant Robert Aitken
- Capt. Archie Ghunming
- Capt. Frank Devlin
- Peers "Montana" Chan
- Phillip Houston
- Harry Little
- William Wilkinson
- Floyd Frazee
- David Tiliquist
- Sergeant Irby E. Moree
- Sergeant Charles F. Bruce
- Sergeant Allen Richter
- Sergeant John R. Murray
- Sergeant George T. Hemming
- Sergeant Jack C. Pamplin
- Sergeant Skywon Chang
- Sergeant Don Y. Eng
- Sergeant Fimce Haimson
- Sergeant Chan Hong

In December 1942, when the Joint Chiefs of Staff issued the 'Golden Directive,' it fundamentally reorganized the SO; it was no longer authorized to operate in the Western Hemisphere, and the OGs were to come under the direct control of Theatre Commanders while deployed.

The OGs were split away from the SO, and granted OSS Branch status under the newly established Operational Group Command (OG). *Note that the abbreviations "OG" and "OGs" refer to two different organisms: OGs were the Operational Groups that comprised the OG.*

Goodfellow was advanced from Director SO to the position of Assistant Director for the entire OSS for the remainder of the war.

Goodfellow's son, M. Preston Goodfellow Jr, interrupted his attendance at Dartmouth in 1943, and served as a bombardier in the 5th Air Force in New Guinea and Australia. It is unknown if Goodfellow kept tabs on his son during the war.

== Korean War years and controversial relationship with Syngman Rhee ==
British historian Max Hastings wrote that Goodfellow provided Rhee with the passport that allowed him to return to Korea.

Goodfellow was appointed Special Political Adviser to Lieutenant General John R. Hodge.

Goodfellow organized South Korea's democratic Council, becoming a key figure in the building of the country's new government.

Goodfellow said:

"We’ve got to turn over to the Koreans as soon as possible the job of self-government... The Koreans are ready for self-government... provincial elections should be held as soon as possible..."

Hodge said of the situation with Rhee and Goodfellow:

"Recommend that someone in Washington get hold of Rhee and talk frankly to him about the dangers of his apparent line of action. Mr. Preston Goodfellow... has complete confidence of Rhee.... Rhee is nuisance in that he wants everything done his own impractical way..."

He left the country in 1946.

Goodfellow continued to act as Special Adviser to President Syngman Rhee in the 1950s, advising him on tungsten purchasing, banking decisions, nuclear power status, and more. Goodfellow helped in the effort to organize the former President's exile in the United States.

== Civilian life and retirement ==
Goodfellow joined the Board of Directors for the Boys Clubs of America, where he met Herbert Hoover, who was the Chairman of the Board.

He became the Publisher of the Pocatello Tribune.
