= Operational Group Command =

- Active: 23 December 1942
- Disbanded: 1945
- Country: United States
- Part of: Office of Strategic Services
- Nickname: The OGs
- Motto: The Glorious Amateurs
- Engagements: World War II

Commanders
- Chief: Alfred T. Cox
- Chief: Colonel Russell B. ("Russ") Livermore

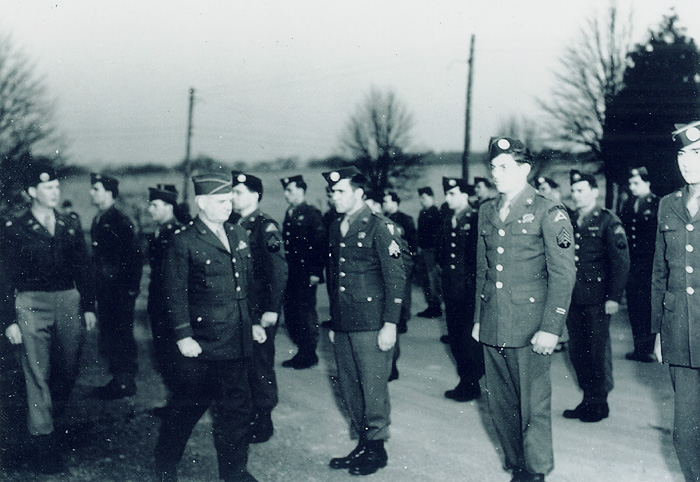
English: General William J. Donovan reviews the Operational Groups (OGs) at Area F, the Congressional Country Club in Bethesda, Maryland, prior to their departure for China.

Operational Group Command (OG) was a branch of the Office of Strategic Services (OSS) during World War II that specialized in clandestine and covert operations, combat search and rescue of POWs and Allied spies captured in areas occupied by the Axis powers, commando-style raids on key targets, frontline military intelligence gathering, guerrilla warfare, independent operations against designated Axis powers targets, maneuver warfare, providing military assistance to resistance movement groups in areas occupied by the Axis powers, special reconnaissance, and support of military strategy and tactical operational plans.

The original A-Teams of the United States Army Special Forces (Green Berets), Operational Detachment Alpha (ODA), are modeled after the successes of Operational Group Command and its groups.

William Donovan and Millard Preston Goodfellow were concerned with creating guerrilla commando units within Special Activities/Goodfellow (SA/G) as early as December 1941.

Operational Group Command was made up of Operational Groups (OGs), which were originally created on 23 December 1942 as a division within the OSS Special Operations Branch (SO), before achieving branch status.

One key distinction between SO units and the OGs might be that OGs were always dressed in military uniform, and were deployed within the military command structure, whereas SO units were civilian units, often assuming cover identities.

== Command structure ==
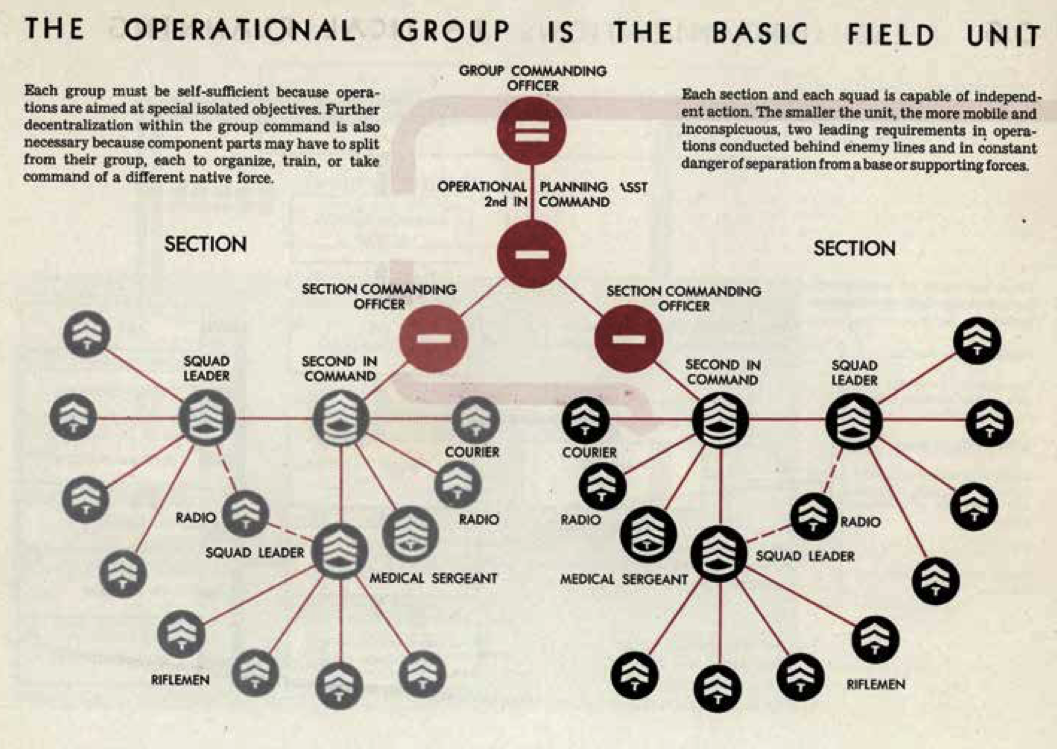

The OGs had a dual leadership command structure. While OGs were deployed in the field, they were under the tactical planning authority of the Theatre Commander, and the strategic planning authority of the director of the OSS, William Donovan.

== Areas active ==
It was active in Burma, China, France, Greece, Italy, Norway, and Yugoslavia.
