= William R. Peers =

United States Army general

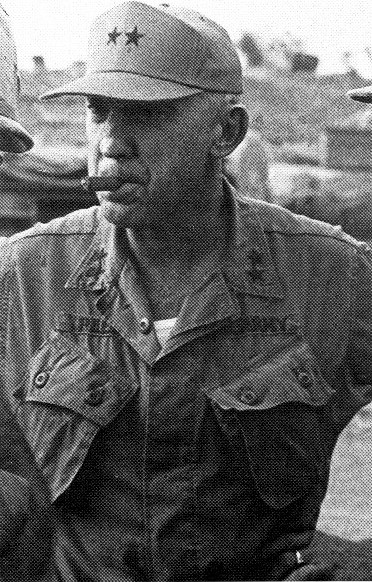
- Born: June 14, 1914; Stuart, Iowa, U.S.
- Died: April 6, 1984 (aged 69); San Francisco, California, U.S.
- Relatives: Barbara Peers, wife; Rose Mary Peers, wife; Barbara "Penny" Hicks, daughter; Christina Peers Neely, daughter
- Military career
- Allegiance: United States of America
- Branch: United States Army
- Service years: 1938–1973
- Rank: Lieutenant General
- Commands: I Field Force, Vietnam; 4th Infantry Division; OSS Detachment 101
- Conflicts: World War II; Kuomintang Islamic insurgency Vietnam War

William Ray Peers (June 14, 1914 – April 6, 1984) was a United States Army general, who is most notable for presiding over the Peers Commission investigation into the Mỹ Lai massacre during the Vietnam War.

== Biography ==
Peers, often referred to by his middle name "Ray" by close associates, was born in Stuart, Iowa, in 1914 and raised in Covina, California. He attended the University of California, Los Angeles, where he was president of the Sigma Pi fraternity chapter and was a member of the Bruins' football, wrestling, and rugby teams. He was also a member of Blue Key and a captain in the ROTC. He graduated with a degree from the College of Education in 1937.

He received a regular Army commission in 1938 after spending a year in the army at the Presidio. After receiving his commission, he was assigned to the First Infantry Regiment in Ft. Francis E. Warren, Wyoming. At the time, the 1st Regiment was a test unit for new equipment, tactics, and organization.

When the United States entered World War II, Peers was recruited into the Office of Strategic Services (OSS). He joined Detachment 101, which carried out guerrilla operations against the Japanese in the China India Burma Theater. At first the unit's operations and training officer, he became the unit's commander when its colonel, Carl F. Eifler, was disabled by injuries in 1943. He held that position until 1945, when he became commander of all OSS operations in China south of the Yangtze River. In this capacity, he led a Nationalist Chinese parachute-commando unit into Nanking, securing the former Chinese capital from communist Chinese before the armistice.

After World War II, Peers joined the CIA, establishing the agency's first training program. During the Korean War, he directed covert operations by Chinese Nationalist troops into the southern part of the People's Republic of China from secret bases in Burma.

Upon his return from China, he attended the Army War College, and afterward he held a series of intelligence and staff positions. With his Asian insurgency warfare expertise, it was inevitable that his career would prosper during the Vietnam War. At its beginning, Peers was the assistant deputy chief of staff for special operations. The next year, he became special assistant for counterinsurgency and special activities for the Joint Chiefs of Staff.

In January 1967, as a major general, he was named the 32nd commanding officer of the 4th Infantry Division ("The Ivy Division"). 14 months later, he was promoted to lieutenant general, and commanded the 50,000 American soldiers of the corps-level I Field Force, Vietnam. Based in the Central Highlands, The I Field Force comprised some of the most aggressive American formations in Vietnam, including the 1st Cavalry Division, 101st Airborne Division and the 173rd Airborne Brigade. Peers also coordinated the operations of four South Vietnamese and the two elite South Korean divisions sent as that country's contribution. Under his leadership, allied troops decisively but controversially, defeated Viet Cong guerrillas and NVA regulars in the battles of Dak To in November 1967, and Duc Lap in August 1968. Two hundred and seventy eight American soldiers were killed taking hill 875 that the NVA eventually evacuated (hill 875, Dak To).

In 1969, Peers was ordered by General Westmoreland to investigate the Mỹ Lai Massacre, being selected because of his reputation for fairness and objectivity. In 1970, Peers issued a report on the incident. Hugh Thompson, who, along with his helicopter crew, were the only soldiers who attempted to stop the massacre, said of the Peers report:

The Army had Lieutenant General William R. Peers conduct the investigation. He conducted a very thorough investigation. Congress did not like his investigation at all, because he pulled no punches, and he recommended court-martial for I think 34 people, not necessarily for the murder but for the cover-up. Really the cover-up phase was probably as bad as the massacre itself, because he recommended court-martial for some very high-ranking individuals.

Peers died at the age of 69 on 6 April 1984, of a heart attack, at Letterman Army Medical Center at the Presidio of San Francisco.

== Books published ==
- Peers, William R. and Dean Brelis. Behind the Burma Road. Boston: Little, Brown & Co., 1963.
- Peers, William R., Joseph Goldstein, Burke Marshall, and Jack Schwartz. The My Lai Massacre and Its Cover-Up: Beyond the Reach of Law?: The Peers Commission Report. Free Press, 1976. ISBN 978-0029122303
- Peers, William R. (1970). Robert E. Lester, ed. The Peers inquiry of the massacre at My Lai. Bethesda, MD: University Publications of America, 1996. ISBN 978-1556556609
- Peers, William R. My Lai Inquiry. W W Norton & Co Inc., 1979. ISBN 978-0393011845

== In popular culture ==
- Oliver Stone's film Pinkville to feature Bruce Willis as William Peers. This film project was cancelled.

== See also ==
- Peers, William R. Central Intelligence Agency. Intelligence Operations of OSS Detachment 101. Retrieved 2012-05-28.
