= Hayes Adlai Kroner =

American soldier and diplomat (1891–1975)

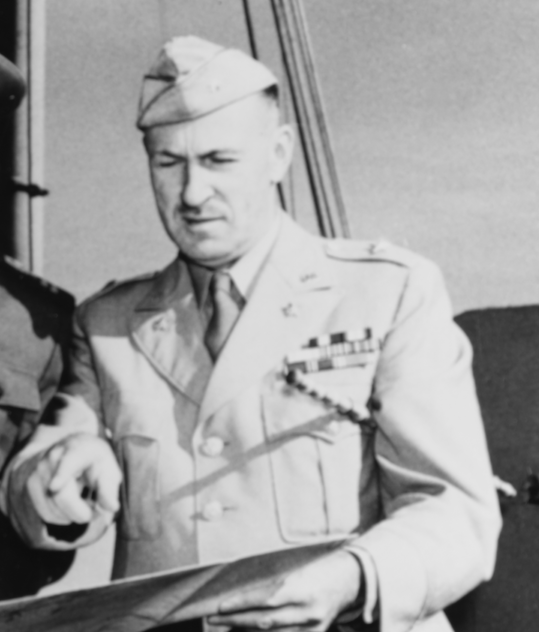
- Born: October 20, 1891; Winterville, Georgia, US
- Died: November 27, 1975 (aged 84) England
- Buried: Winterville Cemetery
- Allegiance: United States
- Branch: Army
- Rank: Brigadier General
- Commands: Military Attache US Army; Commander Fort Brady; Commander Military Intelligence Division; Commander Military Intelligence Service
- Known for: Ran Military Intelligence for General Marshall for most of World War II
- Conflicts: Mexican Border War; World War I; World War II
- Awards: Commander of the British Empire
- Education: Georgia Tech, Civil Engineering
- Spouse: Hilda Gertrude Newholme Way
- Children: Ashby C. Kroner "de Grey," Jr.
- Other work: Grand Tyler, Massachusetts Masonic Lodge of China; Anglo American Association of Peking; Co-founder of the Officers Christian Fellowship

Hayes Adlai Ashby Clarke Kroner (October 20, 1891 – November 27, 1975) was an American soldier, diplomat, General, and Christian minister. For most of World War II, he ran an echelon out of the War Department called the Military Intelligence Service, which was integral for the Allied effort in winning the war against the Axis powers. He is a co-founder of "The Pond," intelligence agency, and also worked closely with the British in London around the time of the development of M.A.G.I.C., where he met Sir John Dill. He was a lifelong diplomat, representing the interests of the USA abroad. After the war, he returned to attache duties, and also went to work for the Philips company. He spent much of his life dedicated to building Christian bible study groups and organizations.

== Early life ==
Kroner was born 1891 in the town of Winterville, Georgia, to parents Mr. and Mrs. FH Kroner. He lived in Atlanta for some time, and attended Georgia Tech, obtaining a degree in civil engineering.

In 1912, Kroner was Commissioned as a Lieutenant into the United States Army under the authority of President Taft. He was immediately stationed at the Presidio in San Francisco. Briefly in 1914, and again in 1915, Kroner was deployed to El Paso, Texas to participate in the Mexican Border War, returning to the Presidio at the end of each deployment.

On 6 July 1915, Kroner was ordered to Tientsin, China, with the 15th Infantry Regiment, to serve in his first appointment as a Military Attache. In Tientsin, he met an Englishwoman (born in China to English parents) named Hilda Way. They were married in September 1916, in Tientsin.

On 3 December 1919, shortly after returning from China, Kroner had been appointed the XO of Camp Funston. His home at the camp burned down, and his wife, baby son, and maid barely escaped with their lives. Every single possession the couple owned was lost in the flames; family photographs, wedding presents, letters from friends, and especially many items they had brought with them from Tientzen. While they were being located new accommodations, they stayed with the family of Colonel William H. Tobin. They traveled briefly to Fort Riley where they stayed with Colonel Ralph M. Parker. They spent Christmas in the home of Colonel George Pullen Peed.

In May 1927, while Kroner was again stationed at the Presidio in San Francisco, he addressed the Association of the United States Army at the Los Angeles City Club about his experiences in China:

"China may be described now as just emerging from the night into the dawn of understanding. Her people through the influence of Europe and America are becoming enlightened to the extent that they are reaching the place where they can think for themselves. By witnessing the World War from a distance they have learned about the successful use of armed forces. They are now employing the same means to meet their own situation... China's most serious menace at present is the Soviet propaganda which is being spread broadcast by agents from Moscow... Russia, seeing the importance of getting a foothold in China, has spared no efforts in spreading dissention among the battling groups."

— Speech to the AUSA of Los Angeles, Major Hayes A. Kroner

In May 1933, while Kroner was enrolled in postgraduate classes at the Army War College, he was transferred to the Army National Guard to serve as an instructor.

In August 1934, Kroner was appointed Assistant Military Attache to the American Embassy in London. His wife packed up their belongings at Hartford, Connecticut and joined him in London. From 1934 to 1939, Kroner served as the US Army military attache to London.

In 1939, Colonel Kroner was assigned as the Commander of Fort Brady, at which time he became the concurrent Commander of the Fort Brady Civilian Conservation Corps. He used his experiences in Europe to address on the children in that Corps that they should remain very unlike the youth of Germany, because "they follow a different star."

On 1 March 1941, Kroner was reassigned to London as a military observer. His responsibilities there involved coordinating American efforts in Britain with the British Chiefs of Staff, and "had made the highest contacts short of Prime Minister Churchill." Kroner at this time visited Bletchley Park to observe the codebreaking efforts of Alan Turing and his staff, in an attempt to gain for America intelligences from the British unit there.

In early June 1941, Kroner returned from England was advanced to the general department staff for the War Department to be the Chief of the British Empire Section for the G-2. In the middle of July, Kroner took over the management of the Intelligence Branch of the G-2 from the retiring Colonel C.H. Mason. He was made Chief of this branch on 17 September, In this role until December.

When Pearl Harbor was attacked, Kroner was relieved as Chief of the Branch and assigned Deputy to General Lee.

== World War II ==
In March 1942, when the Military Intelligence Service (MIS) was established out of the former Military Intelligence Division (MID), Kroner, already Chief of the MID, carried over to become the first Chief of the MIS. He remained in this posting for the majority of the war.

While in this position, he hired John V. Grombach to run an entirely new secret section of intelligence that would eventually come to be called "The Pond."

In September 1944, Kroner was brought before the Pentagon investigation into the intelligence failures leading up to the attacks on Pearl Harbor.

In 1944, Kroner was assigned as a military attache to Brazil, where he remained until 1945.

== Retirement ==
Kroner wound up in some capacity working for the American Philips Company. Philips had approached the War Department when the Nazis had invaded the Netherlands, and offered to fully fund The Pond for the duration of the war.

Kroner moved to England. Kroner would regularly have dinner and tea with David K.E. Bruce. Dwight D. Eisenhower called him an old friend.

He died in England in 1975.

== Religious group ==
While he was performing his duties at the War Department during the 1940s, Kroner would host Bible study and prayer groups on Tuesday evenings. In 1943, Kroner, Gordon Nichol, and Mr. Irwin H. Linton created the Officers’ Christian Union of the United States of America. OCU spread as members were posted around the world during World War II. After the war, he visited Annapolis to preach to the midshipmen and cadets of the service academies there.
