= Death in the City of Light =

2011 book by David King

Death in the City of Light: The Serial Killer of Nazi-Occupied Paris
- Author: David King
- Language: English
- Subject: Serial Killers; Occupied France
- Genre: True crime
- Publisher: Crown
- Publication date: 20 September 2011
- Publication place: United States
- Media type: Print (Hardcover)
- Pages: 432
- ISBN: 978-0-307-45289-4
- LC Class: HV6248.P43 K56 2011

Death in the City of Light: The Serial Killer of Nazi-Occupied Paris is a true crime book by David King first published in 2011. The book covers the serial killing spree in Paris that took place while that city was occupied by the Nazis during World War II, the trial of the chief suspect, Dr. Marcel Petiot, and the circus that ensued.

Laura Miller in Salon magazine calls Death in the City of Light better than Erik Larson's The Devil In The White City, saying that it lands "just shy of setting a new standard for the form." Kirkus Reviews concludes, "The author’s successful transition into the true-crime genre—expertly written and completely absorbing."
