= Behind the Burma Road =

1963 book by William Peers & Dean Brelis

- Author: William R. Peers and Dean Brelis
- Subject: Burma; Guerilla Warfare; OSS Detachment 101; World War II
- Publisher: Little, Brown & Co.
- Publication date: 1963
- Pages: 246

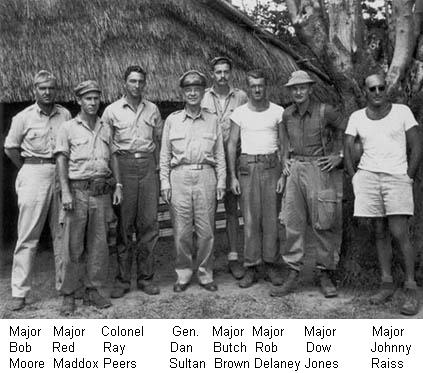
OSS Detachment 101 Officers

Behind the Burma Road is a 1963 book by William R. Peers and Dean Brelis that describes the American guerrilla warfare operations, including those of OSS Detachment 101, during the Burma Campaign in the China Burma India Theater during World War II.

== Themes ==
The book aims in part to be a primer for guerilla fighters. It lists Detachment 101's (Note: OSS, Detachment 101 operated in the China-Burma-India Theater of World War II from April 14, 1942 to July 12, 1945.) accomplishments as far as they were known at the time in terms of the effects of its attacks on and harassment of the Japanese during World War II.

In their own terms, their score included "5,428 known enemy dead and an estimated 10,000 others either killed or seriously wounded. Seventy-five Japanese were captured, 51 bridges destroyed, 9 trains derailed, 232 downed United States air corps personnel rescued, and 342 other allied personnel flown out; 3000 tons of enemy supplies were destroyed and 700 tons captured." The successes of Detachment 101 made possible the entry of Joseph Stilwell's Chinese forces, Orde Wingate's Raiders, Merrill's Marauders, and the other moves against the Japanese Imperial interior lines.

The book is the result of a collaboration between a commanding officer and one of his men. Colonel Peers, who would later rise to the rank of lieutenant general, was commander of 101 from December 1943 to July 1945, and before that, its operations and training officer. Brelis, who later became a novelist and foreign correspondent with Time magazine, was at the time a field agent, first as a sergeant and then as a lieutenant, during 1944 and 1945. Although the story of 101's guerilla operations is seen in this book through the eyes of the commanding officer, the actual text is the result of collaboration between the two men, who hoped it embodied not only the difficult command problems of a complex guerilla operation, but the experiences and accomplishments of the men in the field as well.

== Reception ==
The Central Intelligence Agency has included Behind the Burma Road in its list of the most broadly informative books on intelligence operations and processes available in English.
