= Leland Lassell Rounds =

American aviator, diplomat, and spy (1891-1965)

Leland L. Rounds
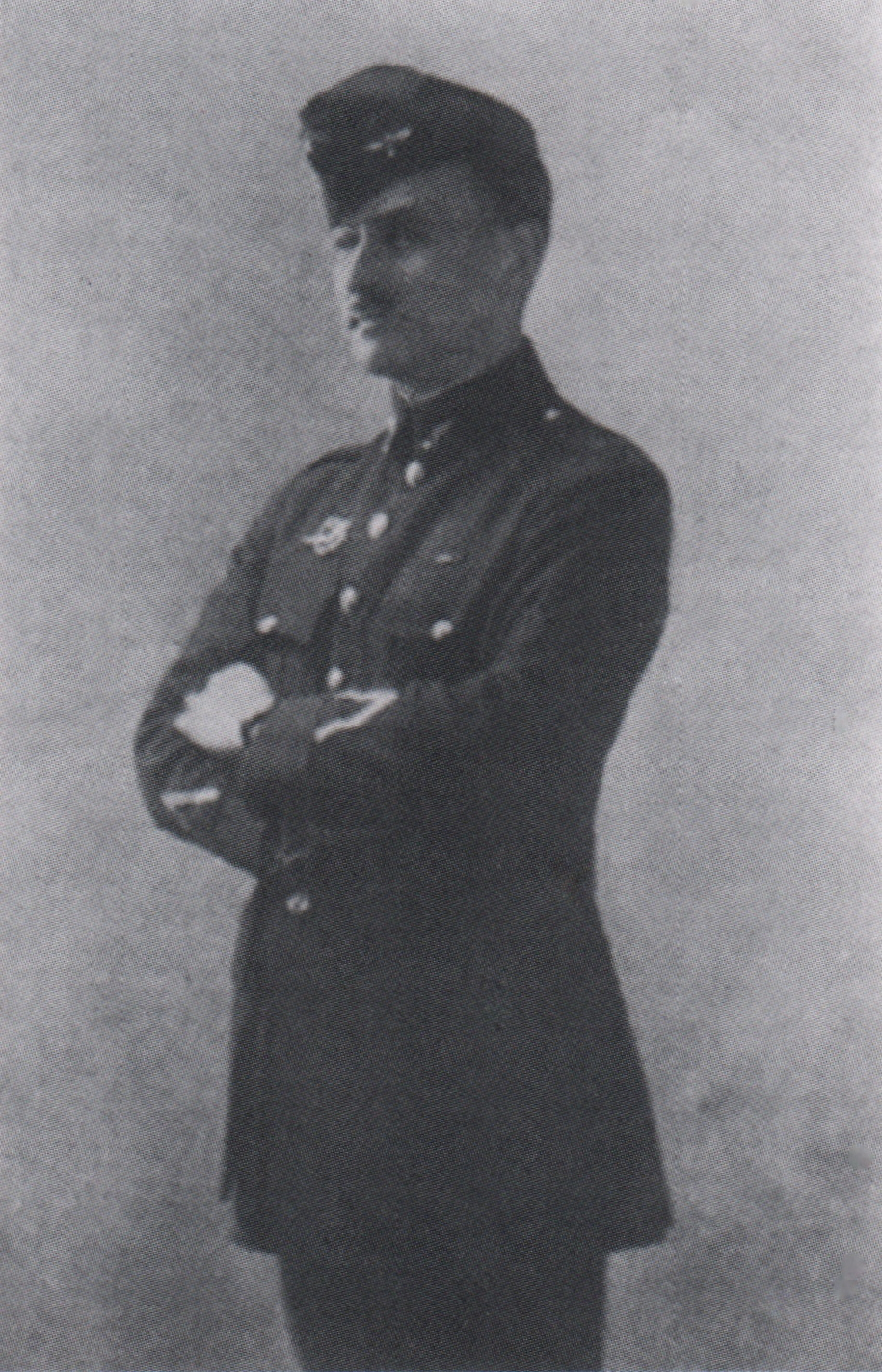
- Born: 22 August 1891 New York City, US
- Died: 2 July 1965 (aged 73) New York City, US
- Allegiance: France; United States
- Branch: Service Aeronautique; United States Army Air Service; United States Army; State Department; Office of the Coordinator of Information; Office of Strategic Services
- Rank: Major
- Commands: Chief Pilot, American Aviation Instruction Center at Tours
- Conflicts: World War I; World War II; Operation Torch; Oran
- Awards: Croix de Guerre with Palm; Meritorious Honor Award
- Spouse: Marcel Julianne

Leland Lassell Rounds was an American aviator, diplomat, spy, and soldier who fought in the skies over World War I, and was the Vice-Consular Officer at the US Embassy in Oran, Algeria during World War II, where he spied on German and Italian deployments throughout North Africa. His work was integral to the Allied victories in both wars.

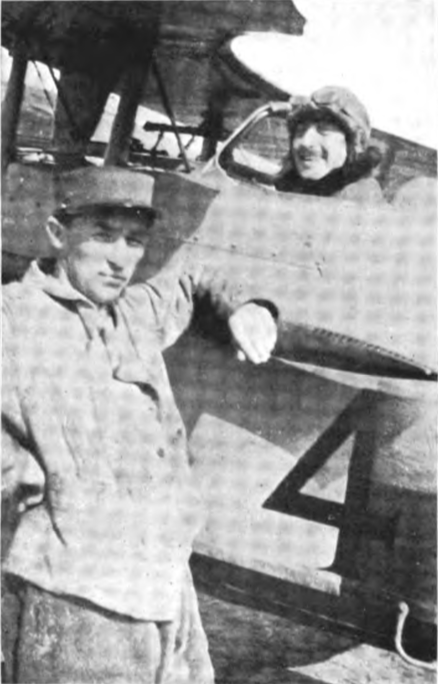
Leland Lassell Rounds, in the cockpit of his aircraft, and his mechanic of the Lafayette Air Corps. Rounds is seen here about to take off for a combat mission over Verdun in his Spad.

== World War I ==
On 16 October 1916, Rounds joined the Lafayette Escadrille and the Lafayette Flying Corps of France's Service Aéronautique and began aviation training at Avord, Pau, and the G.D.E.

Rounds completed his training on 1 August 1917.

Rounds was then assigned to Escadrille SPA 112, where he flew combat missions, and shot down enemy aircraft.

On one particular mission, Rounds was on the verge of blacking out, in a nosedive and tailspin straight for the earth, when a German aircraft came upon him - and Rounds lightly feathered his ammunition into the vickers, and the German aircraft was destroyed.

On another occasion, Round's Spad caught fire at 35,00 meters, and he had to crash land "in a marsh near Verdun, in a sea of cool, delicious, wet mud, and in one sense was none the worse for the bath."

Rounds was grounded from aerial combat missions because he blacked out over 35,000 meters.

On 3 January 1918, he was commissioned as a First Lieutenant in the United States Army Air Service and became the Chief Pilot at the American Aviation Instruction Center in Tours. He held this position until May 1, after which he was assigned to U.S. Aviation Headquarters in Paris until the end of the war.

On 26 March 1926, Rounds was present for the unveiling of the memorial to the Lafayette airmen at St. Cloud, where he heard Marshal Ferdinand Foch say:

"They gave a great example to the world, lighting in America the flame of that just crusade, which the squadron held up so gloriously. Remember that the Lafayette Escadrille was the vanguard of that army which America poured into the struggle in its great and generous effort."

== Interwar years ==
Rounds worked for the United States Department of State as a diplomat in France. On a trip aboard a steamship over the Atlantic Ocean, Leland married Marcel Julianne.

== World War II ==
In the late 1930s, while Rounds was living in the New York area, he was recruited into the War Department.

In the Spring of 1941, Rounds was deployed as a Vice Consular Officer under Robert Daniel Murphy to the U.S. Embassy at Oran, Algeria, where he worked with Ridgway B. Knight to gather intelligences on Axis power troop movements and other important information. Rounds would send much of his information back to the War Department and the Office of the Coordinator of Information (COI), and the Office of Strategic Services (OSS), where it would be read by William L. Langer and Millard Preston Goodfellow, two of the three hands of William J. Donovan.

In a memorandum for General Gruenther by Lieutenant Colonel Eddy dated 40 August 1942, Rounds is noted as being the "Head of the OSS in the whole of the Province of Oran."

Rounds remained in the country prior to Operation Torch, collecting intelligences to aid in the allied landings and movements.

Immediately before Torch commenced, Rounds boarded the headquarters ship of Commodore Thomas H. Troubridge, the HMS Largs, to coordinate and disseminate information between free French forces and the Allied militaries.

After the landings of Torch, Rounds remained in Algeria and acted as political adviser to General Lloyd Fredendall to ensure the Allied beachhead and position remained intact.
