= OSS Detachment 101 =

Military operational unit of the US Office of Strategic Services

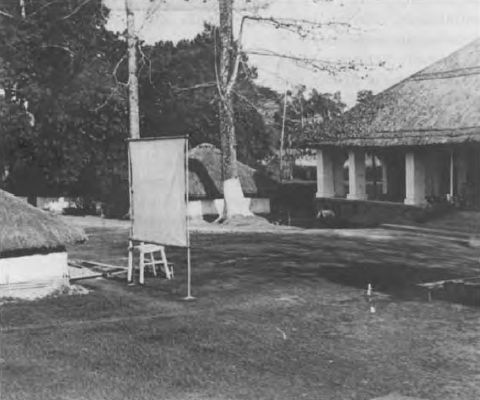
Detachment 101 training camp at Nazira.

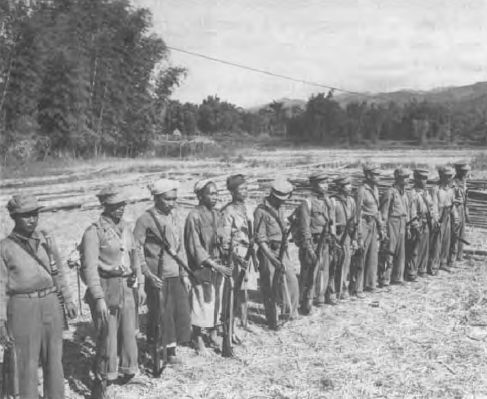
Squad of Kachin Rangers.

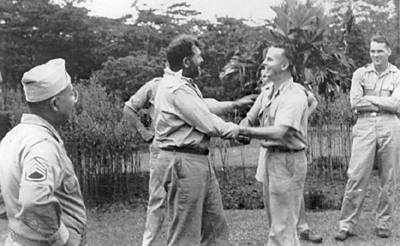
Celebrating Eifler's promotion to colonel in the field.

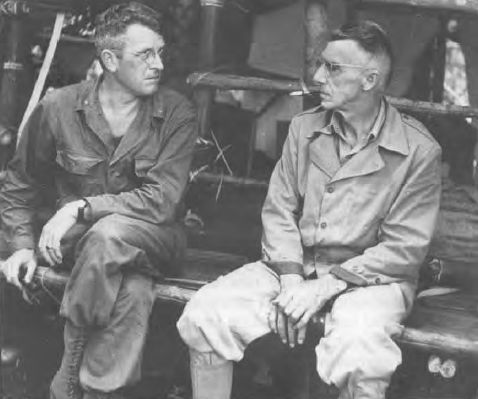
Merrill and Stilwell meet near Naubum, Burma.

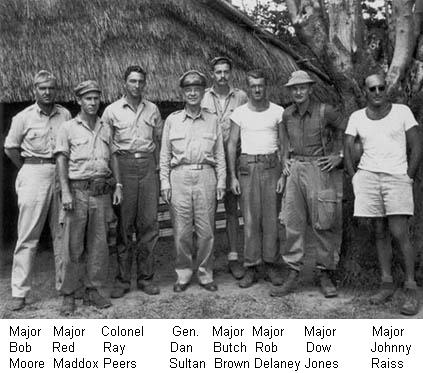
OSS Detachment 101 officers

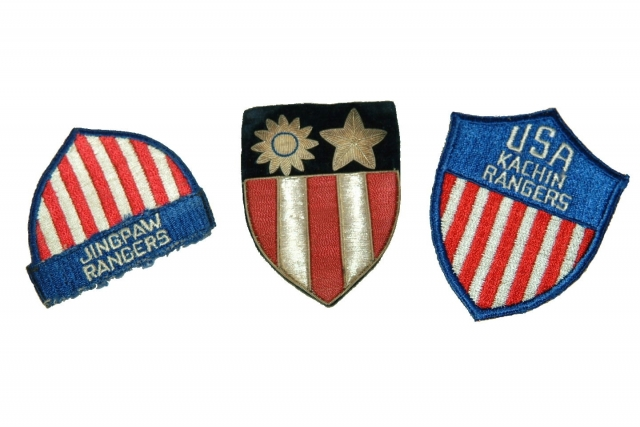
Left to right: Jingpaw Rangers, Headquarters, and Kachin Rangers shoulder sleeve insignia.

Detachment 101 of the Office of Strategic Services (formed under the Office of the Coordinator of Information (COI) just weeks before it evolved into the OSS) operated in the China-Burma-India Theater of World War II. On 17 January 1956, it was awarded a Presidential Distinguished Unit Citation by President Dwight Eisenhower, who wrote: "The courage and fighting spirit displayed by its officers and men in offensive action against overwhelming enemy strength reflect the highest tradition of the armed forces of the United States."

Detachment 101 was said to be "the first American unit ever assembled to conduct guerrilla warfare, espionage and sabotage behind enemy lines."

== History ==
Detachment 101 was the creation of Millard Preston Goodfellow, a leading figure at COI, and Director of Special Activities/Goodfellow (SA/G), which would later become the Special Operations Branch.

"On April 14, 1942, William Donovan, as Coordinator of Information (which evolved into the Office of Strategic Services that June), activated Detachment 101 for action behind enemy lines in Burma. The first unit of its kind in US service, the Detachment was charged with gathering intelligence, harassing the Japanese through guerrilla actions, identifying targets for the Army Air Force to bomb, and rescuing downed Allied airmen. Because Detachment 101 was never larger than a few hundred Americans, it relied on support from various tribal groups in Burma. In particular, the vigorously anti-Japanese Kachin people were vital to the unit's success. By the time of its deactivation on July 12, 1945, Detachment 101 had scored impressive results. According to official statistics, with a loss of some 22 Americans, Detachment 101 killed 5,428 Japanese and rescued 574 Allied personnel." 101's efforts opened the way for Stilwell's Chinese forces, Wingate's Raiders, Merrill's Marauders, and the great counter-attack against the Japanese Imperial life-line."

During most of the unit's existence, it funded and coordinated various resistance groups made up of the Kachin people of northern Burma. The best known resistance force was known as the Kachin Rangers and was under the command of Carl F. Eifler, though often the term Kachin Rangers has been used to describe all Kachin Forces raised during the war by the Americans in Northern Burma.

In July 1942, twenty OSS men moved in and set up headquarters at Nazira in the northeastern Indian province of Assam. No operations of any significance occurred until the end of 1942. Starting in 1943, small groups or individuals were parachuted behind Japanese lines to remote Kachin villages, followed by a parachute supply drop. The Americans then began to create independent guerrilla groups of the Kachin people, calling in weapons and equipment drops. In December 1943 Stilwell issued a directive that Detachment 101 increase its strength to 3,000 guerillas. They were recruited from within Burma, many of them "fierce Kachins".

Once established, the groups undertook a variety of unconventional missions. They ambushed Japanese patrols, rescued downed American pilots, and cleared small landing strips in the jungle. They also screened the advances of larger Allied forces, including Merrill's Marauders.

Eifler held the rank of colonel until he was relieved because of serious head injuries. Lt. Col. William R. Peers took over command. At the end of the war, each Kachin Ranger received the CMA (Citation for Military Assistance) Award. (Note: Rangers were given a "Certificate of Military Assistance" and a medal known as a "Citation for Military Assistance." An illustration of an actual certificate and medal presented to a Kachin Ranger may be viewed here.) Interestingly, the medal was the result of a mistake. An OSS officer, reading a radio message that advised him how to reward heroic Kachin action, misinterpreted the abbreviation for "comma" ("CMA") as signifying some sort of a medal. Reluctant to leave the Kachins empty handed, the OSS quickly created the medal and presented it to them.

In a single campaign, native guerillas in Burma attached to OSS Detachment 101 lost just 47 dead, and they numbered 3,200 in total with 300 American OSS agents, while 10,000 Japanese were routed and 1,300 Japanese killed in spring 1945..

5,447 Japanese were verified to have been killed by Kachins and OSS Burma agents, with an estimated 10,000 more Japanese also killed and 64 Japanese POWs, the OSS casualties were 70 Kachins and 15 Americans.

== See also ==
- Ledo Road
- Force 136
- Fort Hertz
- Behind the Burma Road
- Burma campaign
