= David King (historian) =

American historian and writer (born 1970)

David King (born 1970) is an American historian and writer. He lives in Lexington, Kentucky and has taught European History at the University of Kentucky. He authored the books: Finding Atlantis (2005), Vienna 1814 (2008), and Death in the City of Light: The Serial Killer of Nazi-Occupied Paris (2011).

== Works ==
- 2005, USA, Finding Atlantis: A true story of genius, madness and an extraordinary quest for a lost world. New York: Harmony Books. ISBN 1-4000-4752-8
- 2008, USA, Vienna, 1814: How the conquerors of Napoleon made love, war, and peace at the Congress of Vienna. New York: Harmony Books. ISBN 978-0-307-33716-0
- 2011, USA, Death in the City of Light: The Serial Killer of Nazi-Occupied Paris. New York: Crown. ISBN 978-0-307-45289-4
- 2017, USA, The Trial of Adolf Hitler: The Beer Hall Putsch and the Rise of Nazi Germany. New York: W.W. Norton & Company. ISBN 978-0393241693
