= John Grombach =

American spy and founder of "The Pond"

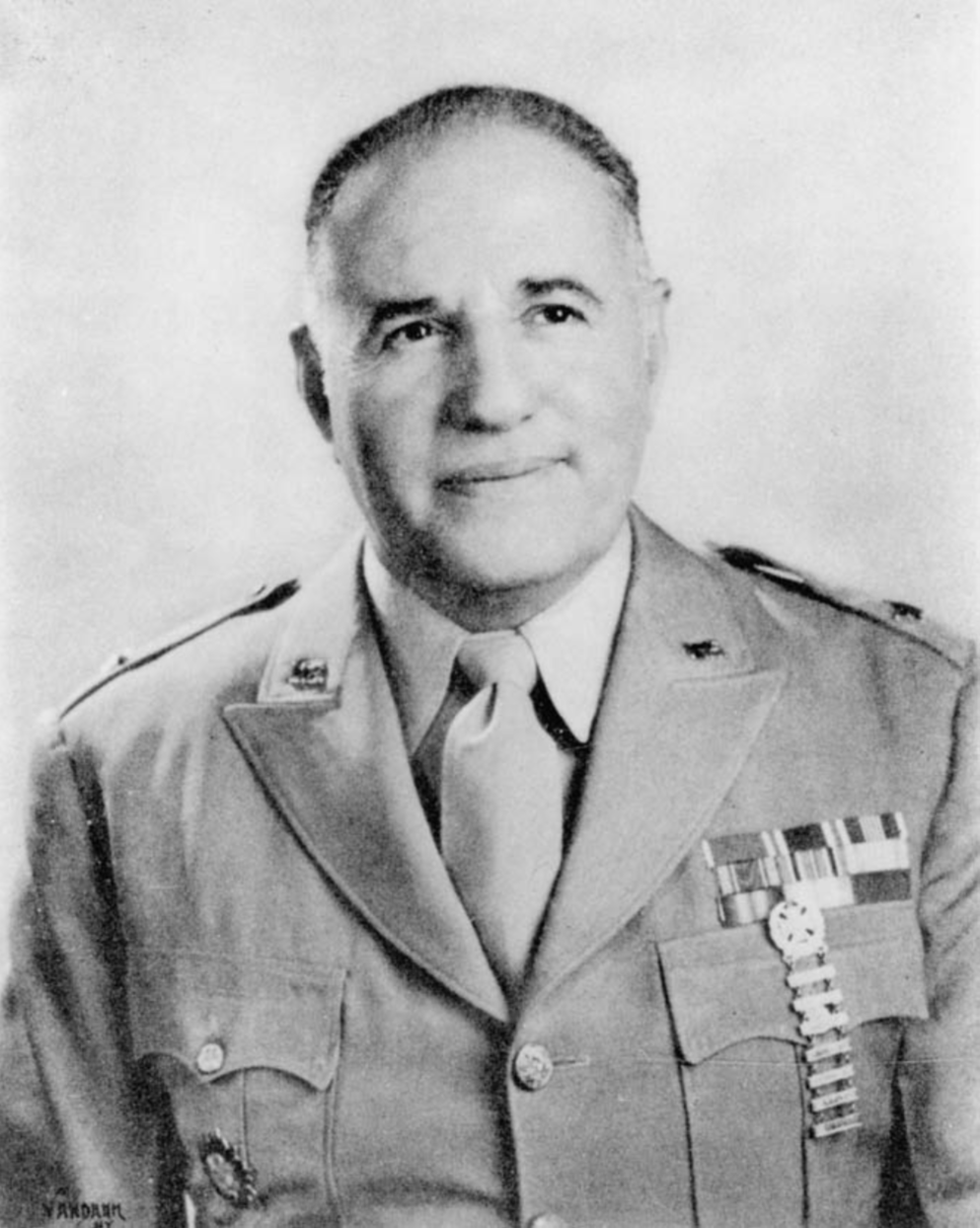

Director of The Pond
- In office 1942–1955
- Appointed by: Hayes Adlai Kroner; George Veazey Strong; George C. Marshall; Joseph T. McNarney

Director of Foreign Broadcast Quarterly
- In office 1941–1942
- Appointed by: Millard Preston Goodfellow

Personal details
- Born: Jean Valentin de la Salle Grombach; January 2, 1901 New Orleans, Louisiana, U.S.
- Died: July 20, 1982 (aged 81) Newton, New Jersey, U.S.
- Resting place: West Point Cemetery
- Spouses: Margaret Louise Grombach; Olga Lohinecz
- Education: Virginia Military Institute; West Point Military Academy
- Known for: Obsessively paranoid anti-communist
- Awards: Legion of Merit, 1946
- Other work: Member of the American Security Council Foundation
- Nicknames: "Frenchy"; "Rudolph Vaselino"

Military service
- Allegiance: United States
- Branch/service: United States Army; New York National Guard; The Pond; Office of the Coordinator of Information; Central Intelligence Agency; Federal Bureau of Investigation; State Department
- Rank: Brigadier General
- Battles/wars: Interwar Period; World War II
- Sports career
- National team: United States
- Sport: Boxing; Fencing; Épée
- Weight class: Middleweight
- Events: 1924 Summer Olympics Boxing Middleweight; U.S. Olympic Committee, 1956, 1960, 1964, 1968
- Team: United States International Fencing; United States Army Boxing; United States Olympic Team

Sports achievements and titles
- Highest world ranking: Intercollegiate heavyweight boxing champion, 1922; Army boxing champion, 1924

John "Frenchy" Grombach, born Jean Valentin de la Salle Grombach, was an American Olympic athlete, soldier, pioneer in radio cryptanalysis personnel management, public broadcaster and radio host, and divergent quick-tempered paranoid intelligence officer. He was involved in Allied efforts during World War II, and the efforts against the USSR during the Cold War. Director of one of the most secretive intelligence agencies in the world, the name of his intelligence organization, "The Pond," (even this is only a codename), was not known to the general public until an accidental disclosure of information in 2001. Initially recruited into the Office of the Coordinator of Information by Millard Preston Goodfellow, Chief of communications for William J. "Wild Bill" Donovan, the quick-tempered Grombach would eventually become one of Donovan's harshest critics. In later years, Grombach became a member of the U.S. Olympic Committee, writing and publishing the Olympic Guides for multiple years.

The Four Pillars of Grombach's approach to intelligence collection were:

1. Experience
2. Secrecy and security
3. Competition
4. Using all available information

It was his Fourth Pillar, to analyze all information, no matter how seemingly insignificant, that led to his organization being labeled as ineffective and a waste of money by almost every agency in Washington. He thought much the same of the other agencies in return.

He died in 1982, in New Jersey.

== Early life ==
Grombach was born in New Orleans as a French citizen in 1901 to the former French Consular Officer to South America, Andrés Grombach (now acting as Salvadoran Honorary Vice-Consular Officer), and Marcella Valentin, a French citizen.

André worked in the dry goods import business, primarily between Mexico City, Tampico, San Salvador, Cuba and New Orleans. Andrés' company, called the "Grombach and Faisans Company," sold postcards from Louisiana, Texas, and other parts of the Caribbean. His family travelled back and forth to Paris, living there from 1905 to 1907 and 1912 to 1913.

He grew to know many important European businessmen from his father's business. These connections would help to shape his future in international intelligence operations.

As a teenager, Grombach worked as a bouncer in a brothel.

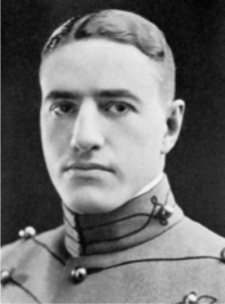
West Point Military Academy class of 23

At the age of 18, Grombach renounced his French citizenship and obtained an American citizenship to attend West Point on a full scholarship. While at West Point, he was an accomplished athlete who had a love for fencing and boxing. He got into a lot of fights with his classmates, or is at least on record for having challenged them to fights. He was given many demerits for his behavior, and was kicked out of the school. But through his father's connections, he secretly graduated with a bachelors of science degree in 1923.

He also attended Virginia Military Institute.

He stayed on the boxing circuit throughout the 1920s and 1930s. He became friends with many boxers of the day. In 1924, he competed for the United States Olympic boxing team in the Summer Olympics as a Middleweight, but he did not win any medals. From 1924 to 1928, he maintained a membership in the International Amateur Boxing Federation, matching up against opponents from all over the world. Some of his matches were covered by the New York and Brooklyn press.

From 1924 to 1940, he was a member of the U.S. International Fencing teams, competing in London in 1926 and in Paris in 1937. He later won a US Fencing Championship in team épée with the New York Athletic Club team in 1938.

== Interwar years ==
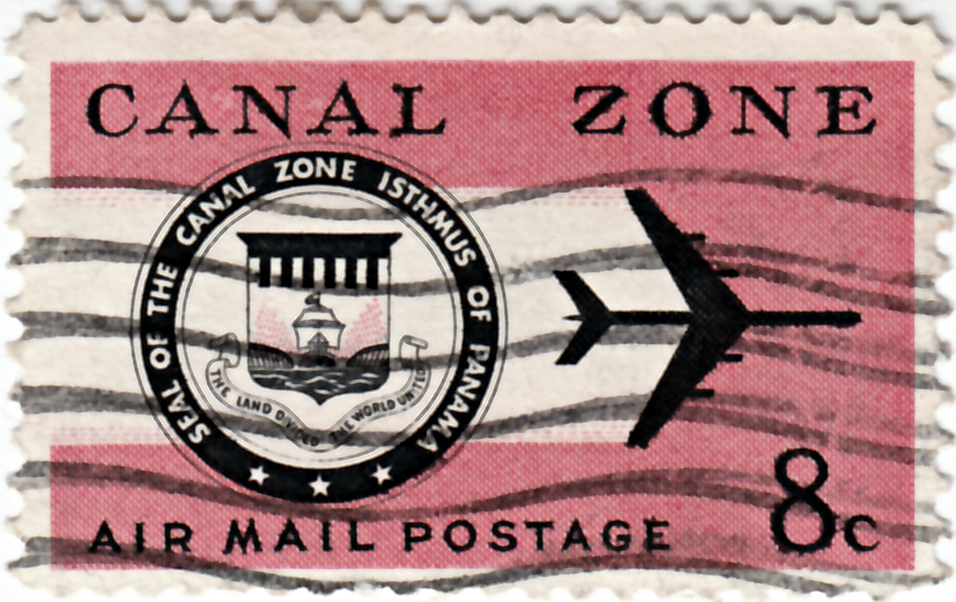
Stamp printed from the Panama Canal Zone, where Grombach was stationed from 1926 until 1928. The Panama Canal Zone was an American colony.

From 1924 to 1928, he was on active duty where he was a Military Police officer assigned to the Assistant G-2 at the War Department. From 1926 to 1928, Grombach was sent by the G-2 to be headquartered in the Panama Canal Zone (at that time still an American colony) to perform undercover operations as the Assistant Provost Marshal. While in Panama, he joined the Panama Fencers Union, and continued fighting in bouts.

Then he was assigned the area of New York City, officially to coordinate between the War Department and the motion picture and theatre industries. Other sources claim that his purpose was to perform investigations there. While he was assigned this post, he began to fall in love with radio production and the entertainment industry. He attended theatrical performances and watched early black and white video productions as a part of his assignment, and learned to appreciate their value as not only entertainment, but morale devices.

In 1928, Grombach left the army and joined the New York National Guard, so that he could dedicate more time to the entertainment industry.

He started writing and producing for a company called the Judson Radio Program Corporation, owned by Arthur Judson, which was a subsidiary of Columbia Broadcasting and Paramount Publix, and in 1929, Judson Radio became Columbia Broadcasting System, and Paramount Publix became "Grombach Productions, Incorporated," where he served as its President until the breakout of the war in 1941. From 1929, he was also the President of "Jean V. Grombach, Incorporated." The next year he became President of "Adv. Recording Service."

== Early World War II ==
When the war began in 1941, he was reinstated into active duty as a Captain for the Military Intelligence Service.

== Foreign Broadcast Quarterly and other radio work ==
One of Grombach's obsessions was the radio, and how radio could be used not only to entertain, but to spread propaganda, listen to enemies, coordinate information, and defeat fascists and communists like Hitler and Stalin.

Grombach and a man named Millard Preston Goodfellow were good friends from New York before the war, as both members of the journalism industry and New York National Guard. Goodfellow had been given a directive by Donovan to carry on with the establishment of a communications network for the Office of the Coordinator of Information (COI) that had begun with cryptanalysis efforts by Elizabeth Friedman and Kermit Roosevelt, Jr. Goodfellow recruited Grombach into the COI to help him establish this network not only because they had been friendly members of the 'Oh So Social' NYC elite - Grombach had written a seminal piece of military literature on the necessity of radio propaganda in the year 1940:

"The actual recreation, entertainment, and morale building qualities of radio are almost important as the propaganda and counter-propaganda which are in most cases carried within the talks and shows broadcast. If radio is a "weapon," then we can carry the comparison further and call the entertainment the "propellant" by which it reaches the ears of millions, and propaganda the "disruptive" that either explodes theories and ideals, and leaves horrible debris of apprehension and confusion, or crystallizes the understanding and gives men the urge to fight on...

In a visit to England just before the war, it was my good fortune to discuss World War No. 2 with my friend, the late Sir Basil Thomson, who was head of Scotland Yard for eleven years and head of the British secret service in World War No. 1. His last remark to me was: "Remember that in the next war, radio will be the secret as well as the invisible weapon one always wonders about when a new war comes along." I know now he was right, and I hope that this article may at least serve to prevent its readers from underrating the problems by this new weapon."

— Captain John V. Grombach, NGUS, The Invisible Weapon

Grombach was indispensable to Goodfellow in building this network. Together, they followed the work of Friedman and built a radio intelligence program of collection, decryption, and analysis for the COI in Washington, D.C. Later, they expanded to a larger center in New York. Grombach established the Foreign Broadcast Quarterly (FBQ), which was the front alias for the communications center, and COI purchased NBC's Long Island radio station on Maple Drive in Bellmore.

William Donovan grew distrustful of Grombach. In one memo addressed to Goodfellow, Donovan wrote "...do not use Grombach!" In another memo, Donovan wrote: "I am disturbed by this talk of Grombach... It is clearly not evident to you, but I am told by all sides that he talks too much."

It was true that there were leaks of FBQ's operation within the government.

Donovan had caught wind of three things: that Grombach was planning to build a Black Chamber in New York, that Grombach had married a woman without vetting her for security clearance before giving her an assistant director role in the FBQ, and that Grombach had already been recruited by Donovan's rival General George Strong and the State Department to help build a competing agency to COI within the Military Intelligence Service that would come to be called The Pond.

In May 1942, Donovan had Grombach dismissed from COI, beginning Grombach's spiral of hatred and distrust toward Donovan and the COI, but Goodfellow would still continue to occasionally use him as an undercover operative throughout the war.

The FBQ, however, was also dismantled in May when Donovan's rivals convinced President Roosevelt to order the COI to relinquish control over any communications efforts and propaganda to the War Department. This abruptly forced the dissolution of the COI.

== The Pond and World War II ==
Sometime before Pearl Harbor, US Army Generals Hayes Adlai Kroner, George Veazey Strong, George C. Marshall, and Joseph T. McNarney decided they needed within the structure of the War Department and G-2 an organization for intelligence. The Army did already have an organization for intelligence gathering called the Counterintelligence Corps (CIC), having recently been helmed and perfected by FBN New York District Supervisor Garland H. Williams, but that unit was a much more investigational-structure organization not necessarily fit for the purposes desired by Strong, Kroner, McNarney, and Marshall.

The War Department needed a secure covert intelligence service, and one that they could directly control. Not one whose exploits were covered by the American press, like the OSS. In the Spring of 1942, they appointed Grombach to head up a new organization of secret intelligence gathering they would call the "Secret Intelligence Branch." Today, we know that agency as "The Pond."

Grombach oversaw The Pond from his office in New York's Steinway Hall building, where he masqueraded as a public relations consultant for Philips, the Dutch company that approached the American government when their country got invaded by the Axis; Philips provided an effectively blank check for much of the war to fund Pond activities. The Pond functioned covertly through various multinational corporations, including American Express, Chase National Bank, and the electronics giant Philips, headquartered in the Netherlands.

Nobody in the government knew of The Pond, except the State Department, who learned of the organization early on in the War. From NARA Archives:

The POND, a codename at State Department for an intelligence operation founded in WWII, was conducted jointly by the War and State Departments. One Foreign Service Officer (FSO) in each US Embassy (in the countries covered by the POND) was the POND officer and was provided with secret funds under his control and secret communications direct to the Department. James McCargar was FSO in Budapest (1946-47) and was also the POND officer in Hungary at that time.

The primary problem in cultivating agents from the State Department was that they are not trained in any of the arts of intelligence that are required to avoid enemy counterintelligence campaigns. Giving a diplomat a few days training was hardly enough to ensure the validity of this organization.

Debate exists within the historical community about the value of The Pond's collection capabilities, with the general consensus currently being that it contributed very little to the war effort, under the proviso from most historians that when the rest of NARA records on the subject entitled the "Grombach Organization" files are declassified, the consensus is bound for reconsideration. The majority of information on Grombach and The Pond has only been available for public viewing at NARA since 2010, and most of the information is not digitally archived, but in microform.

Historian Mark Stout, formerly of the CIA and Historian at the International Spy Museum, sometimes thought to be the leading expert on Grombach, has said:

"Grombach thought of intelligence gathering differently. He thought that all information should be handed over to analysts. CIA's method was to... sift through the intelligence and only pass on to analysts what they deem important... Grombach was interesting... but he never lied."

Historian Thomas Boghardt from the Center of Military History, United States Army, writes in Covert Legions that:

"In marked contrast to Grombach’s combativeness on the home front, his organization collected little of value. The surviving files of the Grombach organization on Nazi Germany contain mostly trivia, and the Pond’s informants operated on the fringes of society... Frustrated with the poor quality of Grombach’s information, an officer of the Military Intelligence Division once noted that it “meant absolutely nothing.”

== The Pond after World War II ==
The FBI heard rumors of a strange operation on April 10, 1947, that was calling itself the "Commercial Research Bureau," run by Grombach during the war and onward, which they suspected of having ties to USSR spies. Field agents were deployed to investigate the rumors, and Grombach became enraged. An interesting exchange of conversation revolved between Grombach and the Agents, being paraphrased here:

"We informed him to keep this information confidential... He informed us to keep this information confidential... We informed him that we were... the FBI... He informed us that he was... someone important... but he couldn't actually tell us..."

Director D.M. Ladd got in contact with Grombach the next day, and Grombach arranged with him to have the State Department loop in the FBI on all intelligence coming out of Europe.

== Entering into private practice ==
Wherever Grombach ran this organization, he made antagonists of leadership. He had been embittered at William Donovan, and hated almost everyone in the Central Intelligence Agency, which was now in charge of his organization.

In 1955, Allen Dulles had received intelligence of Grombach meeting with Senator Joe McCarthy, possibly feeding him names of suspected Communists. Dulles was frustrated, and blacklisted Grombach. When Grombach called almost every federal agency he could think of, they picked up the phone, but would not fund his agency.

Grombach became a private detective. According to everyone who knew him, or knew of him, he was a "Public relations and business expert." Despite their dislike of him, the Intelligence Community never once burned him.

== Sports ==
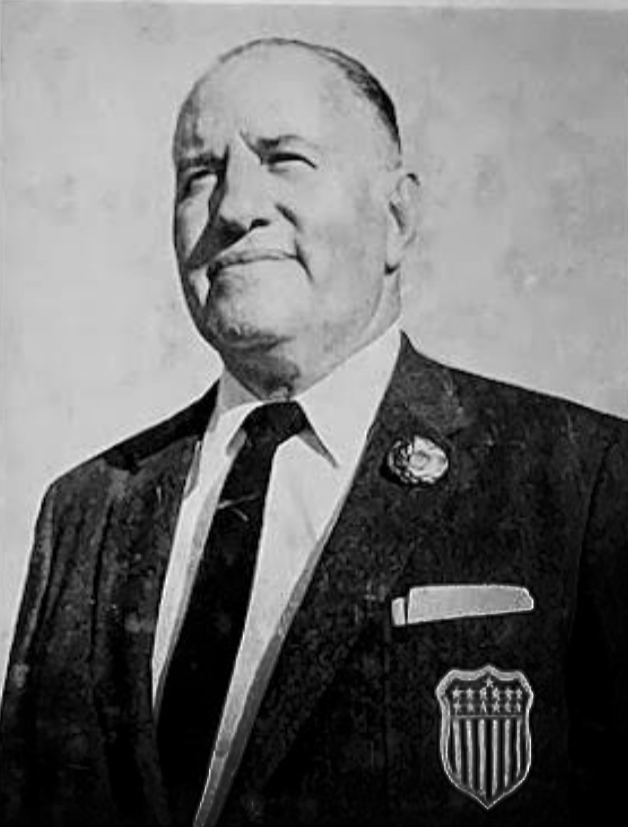
John Grombach poses for a photo wearing the US Olympic Team patch on his lapel.

Grombach was seemingly as obsessed with sports as he was obsessed with most other things in his life. He had remained a lifelong fastidious observer of all things boxing, and wrote several books on boxing and the Olympics, including Touch Football (1942), Saga of Sock: A Complete Story of Boxing (1949), and The Olympic Cavalcade.

He served on the United States Olympic Committee for several years.

== Written works ==
- The Great Liquidator
- Military Journals
  - Kill or Get Killed
  - The Invisible War
- Other Journals
  - SPUR
  - Sportsman
  - Adventure
- How to Box
- Radio Production
- History of Boxing
- Saga of Sock
- Saga of the Fist
- Olympic Cavalcade of Sports
- The Olympic Guide
- Touch Football
