= Carl F. Eifler =

United States Army officer

Carl Frederick Eifler (June 27, 1906 – April 8, 2002) was a U.S. Army officer best known for having commanded Detachment 101, which served behind the enemy lines in Japanese-occupied Burma during World War II. He helped stand up 13 army reserve detachments outside major universities to preserve the expertise and knowledge of the returning GIs.

== Biography ==
Eifler was born in Los Angeles, California to Carl Eifler Sr. and his wife Pauline. His parents were both born in Wisconsin to German-American immigrants, and his father was a "rig builder" in a buggy shop. He served in the Los Angeles Police Department, followed by the United States Border Patrol.

Eifler enlisted in the Army at the age of 15, and spent a year as a private in Panama before being returned to the US as underage. He served in the United States Army Reserve in the 1930s, earning a commission, and he was called to active duty in early 1941. Shortly afterwards, Eifler was ordered to report to "Wild Bill" Donovan, commander of the Coordinator of Information, which would soon become the Office of Strategic Services (OSS).

Eifler was selected to command Detachment 101, a paramilitary organization intended to operate against the Japanese army in the Burma Campaign, in China India Burma Theater. Eifler performed his work with distinction, surviving two plane crashes, but finally being disabled by head injuries that required 18 months of hospitalization. He held the rank of colonel when he was relieved of command in 1943 because of his injuries. Eifler turned over command of Detachment 101 to Lt. Col. William R. Peers, and was flown to Hawaii to recover.

In 1945, the OSS had Eifler devise a plan to parachute into Nazi Germany disguised as a German general to kidnap Werner Heisenberg, Germany's top nuclear physicist, smuggle Heisenberg to Switzerland, and bring him to the United States. Eifler did not end up doing the mission, as he was told the Americans had already developed the Atom Bomb. The sole reason for kidnapping Heisenberg was to prevent the Germans from developing the bomb before the Americans. In reality, the mission was still alive, though it was handed to Moe Berg.

After the war, Eifler earned a doctorate of psychology from the Illinois Institute of Technology and worked as a clinical psychologist in Monterey, California. He died in 2002 at the age of 95 in Salinas, California. Eifler (a burly 6'2") had outlived both of his wives as well as his son, Carl Henry Eifler.

Colonel Eifler is a member of the Military Intelligence Hall of Fame and is honored by Eifler Gym at Fort Huachuca, Arizona.
