= The Pond (intelligence organization) =

United States espionage organization

The Pond was a small, secret organization formed by the government of the United States which operated between 1942 and 1955. It engaged in espionage. It was formally acknowledged by the US government in 2001.

== History ==
In the spring of 1942, Brigadier General Hayes Kroner, the head of the War Department's Military Intelligence Service, was given the go-ahead to set up an espionage organization separate from William "Wild Bill" Donovan's Office of Strategic Services. He selected to head it U.S. Army Captain (Jean) John V. Grombach, who was a rival and previous employee of Donovan.

In 1955, The Pond was disbanded by the American government because of post-war centralization of intelligence gathering and questions about the organization's effectiveness.

On April 27, 2008, the Associated Press reported that the Central Intelligence Agency planned to "release a stash of Pond-related papers accidentally discovered in a Virginia barn in 2001" and hand them over to the National Archives at College Park, Maryland.

== John "Frenchy" Grombach ==
Jean (John) Valentin Grombach led the Pond in intelligence operations from 1942 to 1955. Grombach was an anti-Communist who had an obsession with secrecy and security. Grombach was born in New Orleans in 1901 to a French family. He was an accomplished athlete who had a love for fencing and boxing, even competing on the United States Olympic boxing team. He grew to know many important European businessmen from his father's business and shipping involvements, sports promotions, and managing the Olympics. These connections would help to shape his future in international intelligence operations.

At the age of 18, Grombach, the son of the French consul, renounced his French citizenship and obtained an American citizenship to attend West Point. Despite having 8 demerits, he graduated with a bachelors of science degree in 1923. He then spent five years on active duty where he had his first involvement in intelligence as assistant G-2.

In 1928, Grombach left the army and joined the New York National Guard. After a successful stint working for a subsidiary of CBS and Paramount Publix, Grombach founded his own radio program production companies. He returned to the army in 1941 to work for the Office of the Coordinator of Information. Grombach claims that throughout that time he was secretly working on confidential intelligence projects.

In the spring of 1942, Brig. Gen. Hayes Kroner selected Grombach to head the Pond.

Grombach was also a writer who authored an article for Infantry Journal titled "Kill or Get Killed," and an essay for American Mercury.

== State Department ==
From NARA Archives:

GROUNDHOG was cryptonym for the POND organization headed by John V. Grombach. The POND, a codename at State Department for an intelligence operation founded in WWII, was conducted jointly by the War and State Departments. One Foreign Service Officer (FSO) in each US Embassy (in the countries covered by the POND) was the POND officer and was provided with secret funds under his control and secret communications direct to the Department. James McCargar was FSO in Budapest (1946-47) and was also the POND officer in Hungary at that time.

== Tactics and strategy ==
=== Focus ===
The Pond, led by Grombach, provided the FBI with information on leftist radicals and external influences on the United States. The covert organization's focus developed into the exploitation of communists, especially in America's intelligence institutions.

=== Secrecy ===
The Pond was extremely small and unknown to most. The team used codewords and cryptic nicknames in all of the Pond's internal records. Grombach never shared the identities of his sources, totaling over 2,500 field personnel from 32 countries. Although the Pond was an Army operation, its existence was kept from the Office of Naval Intelligence, and it is not clear whether President Truman knew of it. After the end of World War II, Truman decided to shut down the OSS, largely due to Grombach's reports. The extreme secrecy and small size of the Pond are the reasons why it survived after the end of the war. The Pond remained a secret long after its operations ended.

=== Budget ===
The War Department initially allocated $150,000 to the Pond per year, and this grew to over $300,000 by the end of World War II. The Pond collaborated with foreign businesses to increase their financial resources.

=== Methods ===
The Pond employed personnel and agent observers from large corporations around the world. The Pond started out as a part of the War Department General Staff but became a private company working under government contract. It changed jurisdictions many times until operations ceased in 1955.

== Operations ==
=== List of OSS Soviet Agents ===
Starting in 1942 as the leader of The Pond, John Grombach worked with a defected Soviet intelligence officer, Alexander Barmine to discover a list of OSS Soviet agents. This was mostly left to the wayside by the United States government because the Soviet Union was now an ally of the United States.

=== Project 1641 ===
As a study of communist subversion, John Grombach began this project as a comprehensive record of reports eliminated by Alfred McCormack along with identifying two communists that worked for McCormack and several others. The list of supposed communists included:

- Alger Hiss
- Carl Marzani
- John Stewart

The monographs called for research into McCormack to be investigated by superiors, but was later set aside as Grombach was accused of discrediting an officer of the Military Intelligence Service along with inappropriately revealing classified information. Although it seemed the end, this was not so. With the abolishment of the OSS by Harry S. Truman, the branch of Research and Analysis was sent to the State Department along with Alfred McCormack, Secretary of State Byrnes. With McCormack as leader of the Interim Research and Intelligence Service, John Grombach would compile the names of 15 G-2 operatives who had moved to the State Department along with McCormack and which were previously suspected of disloyalty. Grombach sent these names to the House Committee of Military Affairs where an investigation would begin. Without revealing his name, the committee made public Grombach's allegations in March 1946, would stir up controversy between McCormack and the Committees chairman, pushing McCormack to resign in April 1946.

=== Marcel Petiot ===
Marcel Petiot was a doctor, serial killer, and source for The Pond. Petiot used his occupation as a doctor to gain information from his patients' gossip, and passed that on to John Grombach. Stationed in Paris, Petiot had German Abwehr officers and east Paris refugees as patients. With this information, Petiot identified German Abwehr officers that had been sent to the United States, which were later found by the FBI and some of whom were convinced to work for the United States.

=== Information Transportation ===
While investigating a lead that suggested German missiles were being produced in Norway and Sweden, The Pond transported its information via diplomacy from London. Grombach suspected that the pouches that British couriers were transporting were being opened, thus submitted an unopened pouch for FBI investigation, confirming that the pouch had been opened and resealed. Because of this, American couriers transported the pouches from there on out.

=== Hungary ===
The Pond targeted Hungary both during and after World War II. During the war, they focused on gathering intelligence on battle information and Admiral Horthy's attempts to remove Hungary from the war. After the war in 1946, James McCargar became a case officer for the Pond located in Hungary and focused his reporting on an unavoidable communist takeover. His work led to the exfiltration of 75 anti-communist Hungarian political leaders.

=== DAHL ===
Under the sponsorship of the Central Intelligence Agency, The Pond began DAHL as an information assembly in Argentina and Uruguay. John Grombach reported on Uruguayan officials that were communist, but many of the submitted reports were rejected by the CIA as a result of Grombach's unreliable sources and without proof. This may have been the operation that led to the dissolution of The Pond.

== Post World War II ==
Before the end of World War II, John Grombach's executive officer, Charles Stevenson, supported The Pond and its endeavors and tried to fight for The Pond. After World War II had ended, Hoyt Vandenberg, the Director of Central Intelligence, wanted to consolidate power into the Central Intelligence Group, thus pushing against Stevenson for the closing of The Pond. In April 1947, Grombach feared that The Pond would be discontinued, and decided to reveal the organization and its accomplishments to the public by proving its existence to the New York Times. After what seemed to be a loss for Grombach, in early 1947, late 1948, the State Department began funding The Pond in secret, but at a much lower rate than the War Department had in the past.

Under the sponsorship of the State Department The Pond was struggling to maintain its merits and in March 1951 would be revealed and resolved under the Central Intelligence Agency.

== The end of The Pond ==
After the Pond was transferred to the Central Intelligence Agency, John Grombach began to submit phony reports against the superiors and workers that he disliked. These false reports and rumors spread by Grombach led to the CIA not renewing the Pond any further after its contract ended on August 15, 1954. All but two operations had ended by January 1, 1955. The CIA continued these last two operations until April 30, 1955. Because it did not have a congressional and public support system, the Pond was beat out by a larger espionage organization. Ultimately, Grombach's philosophy of extreme secrecy led the Pond to its demise.

== Members ==
- Ruth Fischer
- Raoul Wallenberg (unconfirmed)
- James McCargar
- John Grombach

== See also ==
- Marcel Petiot § World War II activities
