= Special Operations Branch =

Branch of the Office of Strategic Services during WW2

Agency overview
- Formed: 1942
- Dissolved: 1945
- Superseding agencies: United States Special Operations Command; United States Army Special Forces; Delta Force; United States Marine Forces Special Operations Command; Special Activities Center
- Headquarters: Washington, D.C.
- Agency executive: Millard Preston Goodfellow, Chief
- Parent department: Deputy Director Strategic Services Operations
- Parent agency: Office of Strategic Services

The Special Operations Branch (SO) was a branch of the Office of Strategic Services (OSS) during World War II that "pioneered" many of the counterinsurgency (COIN), foreign internal defense, and unconventional warfare tactics and techniques used by today's US special operations forces (SOF). Special Operations was the American equivalent of the Special Operations Executive (SOE) of the United Kingdom.

The chief of SO, Millard Preston Goodfellow, reported to the deputy director of Strategic Services Operations.

In the Special Operations Field Manual, OSS director William Donovan writes;

"The mission of the Special Operations Branch is to carry out that part of the OSS mission which can be accomplished by certain physical subversive methods as contrasted with the operations of the Morale Operations, the Operational Groups, and the Maritime Unit. The primary objective of the Special Operations Branch is the destruction of enemy personnel, materiel, and installations."

Special Operations operators and agents trained first at Camp X, then at Camp David, and several National Park Service properties around the Washington, D.C. area.

The concept of OSS Operational Groups (OG) began as special operations units within SO Field Bases, but eventually outgrew the SO, where the newly established Operational Group Command was granted Branch status.

== Responsibilities ==
- Sabotage
  - Types of Sabotage
    - Industrial Sabotage
    - Military Sabotage
    - Political and Public Sabotage
  - Methods of Sabotage
    - Sabotage applied to individuals
    - Sabotage by destruction
    - Sabotage by Resistance
    - Coup de Main Projects
    - Defense Missions
- Direct contact with and support of underground resistance groups.
- Conduct of special operations not assigned to other governmental agencies and not under direct control of theater or area commanders.
- Organization, equipment, and training of such individuals or organizations as may be required for operations not assigned to other governmental agencies.

== Divisions ==
Headquarters

Special Operations was headquartered at the E Street Complex in Washington, D.C.

Field Base Sections

- London
- Burma
- Yugoslavia
- France
- Italy
- Norway
- JEDBURGH
