= Kenneth W. Rendell =

American dealer and historical document expert

- Born: May 12, 1943 (age 83); Somerville, Massachusetts, U.S.
- Occupation: Dealer in historical documents
- Known for: Founder of The International Museum of World War II

Kenneth William Rendell (born May 12, 1943) is an American dealer and expert in historical documents. He founded the now defunct The International Museum of World War II near Boston, Massachusetts. He has also authored multiple books on history and historical documents, and has helped investigate several high-profile forgery cases.

== Early life ==
Kenneth Rendell was born in 1943, the son of Harry, a pharmacist, and Pauline, an art teacher. In 1953, a customer in his father's drug store paid with an 1806 Liberty half-dollar, which launched Rendell into the rare coin business. In 1955, the Somerville Journal recounted how he sold the coin for $3.50, used the money to begin his business, and later bought the coin back for $4.50.

Soon, he was sending out monthly price lists to 500 prospective clients. As a teen, he expanded into several numismatic specialties: he became one of just two specialists in early American coinage in the colonies, political campaign memorabilia, and alternative currencies created during difficult financial times. In 1959, he was appointed to the committee of 35 leading rare coin dealers who set the values in A Guide Book of United States Coins, the standard reference, and was a founding member of the Rittenhouse Society, a group that published original research in the field.

== Historical documents ==
As a teen, Rendell's interests and growing expertise led him into the world of historical documents. He developed his business into one of the most prominent in the world, establishing galleries in New York City, Beverly Hills, and Tokyo. He served as an expert witness for the Internal Revenue Service in the 1973 tax court trial of former Illinois governor Otto Kerner Jr.

=== Developing major collections ===
By the turn of the century, Rendell's reputation as a collector had made him a leading voice in a business that, due to technological innovation, was rapidly changing. He helped Bill Gates start a paper library in his Shangri-La mansion on the shores of Lake Washington.

In 1995, the University of Oklahoma Press published Rendell's book History Comes to Life: Collecting Historical Letters and Documents, considered the standard collector's guide covering all aspects of the field.

== Forgery detection ==
Rendell's pioneering study Forging History, The Detection of Fake Letters & Documents from 1994 was the first reference book to document, with systematic descriptions and exhaustive illustrations, the forensic examination of questioned historical documents.

By 1987, Rendell had founded a course on forgery detection at Columbia University that included the use of ultraviolet light and microscopes in the analysis of ink, paper, and minute details of handwriting.

=== Hitler diaries ===
Genuine Hitler signature (undated)

Forged version of Hitler's signature, which Rendell described as a "terrible rendition"

In the spring of 1983 the West German magazine Stern published excerpts of what were purported to be Adolf Hitler's diaries, which had reportedly been found in a wrecked German transport plane. On May 2, 1983, Newsweek trumpeted the discovery of "Hitler's Secret Diaries" and asked, "Are They Genuine?" Hired by the magazine as a consultant, Rendell investigated "everything—from paper to ink to handwriting to bindings." He also checked into the alleged provenience of the documents" Hired by Stern to investigate, Rendell later published his findings in Forging History.

=== Mormon murders and forgeries ===
Rendell was subsequently drawn into what would prove to be one of the most notorious fraud cases in American history. It centered on Utah native Mark Hofmann, who had forged and sold several documents related to early Mormon history. Hofmann's boldest forgery was soon dubbed the "Salamander Letter. Fearing exposure, Hofmann attempted to kill the main characters. On October 15, 1985, bombs built by Hofmann exploded, killing Utah collector Steven Christensen and a second victim, Kathy Sheets. Investigations led to Hofmann being formally charged with the forgeries and murders." He was subsequently sentenced to life in prison.

=== Jack the Ripper diary ===
In 1993, Rendell was enlisted to test the validity of what was purported to be the diary of Jack the Ripper. He concluded that it was a forgery. Hyperion Press published The Diary of Jack the Ripper, which "included Rendell's full seven-page report to Time Warner Books that it was a hoax. In a five-page rebuttal, the English publisher disagreed with all of his conclusions."

== Collection of Western Americana ==
Another of Rendell's interests is the American West. In 2004–2005, the Museum of Our National Heritage in Lexington, Massachusetts, mounted an exhibition called "The Western Pursuit of the American Dream: Selections From the Collection of Kenneth W. Rendell," comprising letters, diaries, artifacts, and art that he had acquired over decades. The Grolier Club in New York City subsequently hosted an abridged version of the exhibit, 150 objects, which, the club noted, "document this national adventure through the actual words and artifacts of explorers, travelers, warriors, gold seekers, merchants, outlaws—dreamers all—who shaped the American frontier." According to The New York Times the exhibit offered "a sense of the struggle to tame the gorgeous wilderness that stretched beyond the tidy civilizations of the East," and called it "worth spending time with."

In 2004, the University of Oklahoma Press published The Western Pursuit of the American Dream: Selections From the Collection of Kenneth W. Rendell, a book of some 500 illustrations that built upon the original exhibition. In 2013 Whitman Publishing released Rendell's second book devoted to Western Americana, The Great American West: Pursuing the American Dream. Centered on additional artifacts from the author's collections, the book traced the migration of settlers spurred west by "the hope that a better life awaits your initiative, your perseverance, your cleverness, your hard work."

== The International Museum of World War II ==
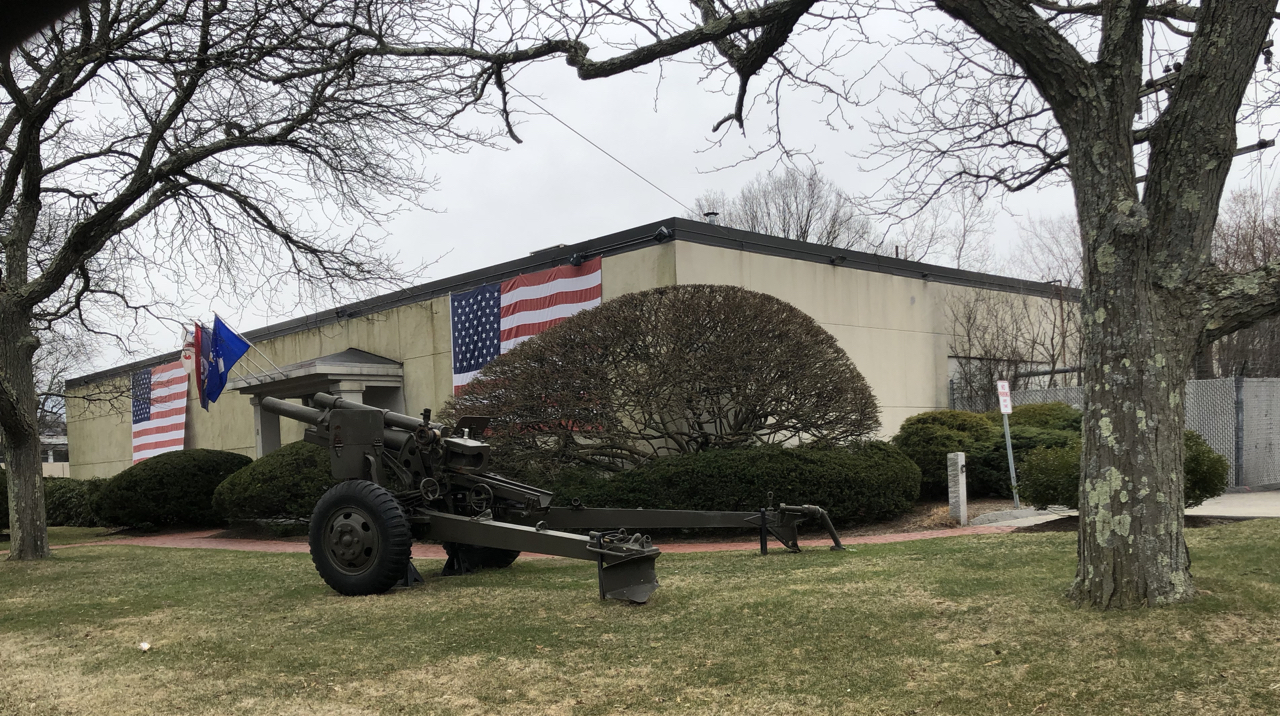
The International Museum of World War II near Boston

In 1959, Rendell began collecting documents about World War II. Over the next 50 years this informal effort grew into an organized and serious endeavor to represent the human story of the causes and consequences of World War II. During the 1960s and 1970s, when there was often little interest in such material at auctions, even from government libraries and archives, he readily (and inexpensively) bought entire collections. He eventually established The International Museum of World War II in a 10,000-square-foot (930 m^{2}) building near Boston, a place, declared Architectural Digest, where "More than 6,000 Artifacts Put History into Unforgettable Perspective." The Boston Globe described the museum as "an evocative and jaw-dropping collection of more than 6,000 wartime artifacts Rendell has gathered over four decades," and "very much an extension of its creator and his passion for the subject." A subsequent Town & Country article noted, "Unlike at most museums, visitors here are allowed to touch the items, if ever so gently."

In 2009, Rendell showcased his World War II document collection with the first of two books, World War II: Saving the Reality. In her foreword, Doris Kearns Goodwin wrote: "Through this unparalleled collection of original letters and artifacts, we follow the story of the war, not as historians after the fact, but by the side of the leaders and the people who lived and died during those dramatic years." In his foreword to 2013's Politics, War and Personality: Fifty Iconic World War II Documents That Changed the World, John S.D. Eisenhower wrote: "Virtual reality dominates our lives. This museum is doubly refreshing … authenticity is not only the norm, it is demanded … every item is authentic, original and real." The museum was regularly acknowledged for its original approach and world-class content. On April 12, 2016, The Power of Anti-Semitism: The March to the Holocaust, 1919-1939, an exhibition developed by Rendell from the museum's collections, debuted at the New-York Historical Society and ran through July 31. An 80-page companion book of the same name, written by Rendell, was published simultaneously. The Wall Street Journal described the exhibit as "powerful," while the director of the New-York Historical Society deemed it "a new—and path-breaking—understanding of the trajectory of anti-Semitism in Europe."

The museum's special exhibitions, based wholly on its own artifacts and documents, included Most Secret: Rudolph Hess's Own Archive, The Reality of the Resistance, Enigma Code Machines and the Imitation Game, and Hitler Attacks, Churchill Rises From the Ashes of Appeasement. The most recent, The 75th Anniversary of Pearl Harbor: Why We Remember, ran from October 8, 2016, through January 7, 2017.

On October 25, 2016, National Geographic Books released The Secret History of World War II: Spies, Code Breakers, and Covert Operations, by Neil Kagan and Stephen G. Hyslop. Featuring a foreword by Kenneth Rendell, it was illustrated almost exclusively with images of artifacts that were in the museum's collections.

In 2016, the museum, originally known as the Museum of World War II, was renamed to better reflect the global perspective of its exhibitions, which, the Imperial War Museum has asserted, boast "the most comprehensive display of original World War II artifacts on exhibit anywhere in the world." The museum contained some 12,500 artifacts, 500,000 photographs and documents, 3,500 posters, and 7,500 reference books. Items from its collections were frequently loaned to other museums, including the Imperial War Museum, in London, the International Spy Museum, in Washington, D.C., and the CIA Museum, in Langley, Virginia.

In 2018, National Geographic Books published Atlas of World War II: History's Greatest Conflict Revealed Through Rare Wartime Maps and New Cartography, again by Neil Kagan and Stephen Hyslop in conjunction with Kenneth Rendell, who wrote the foreword. The 254-page, large-format work drew exclusively from maps in Rendell's collection.

In 2019, it was decided that the museum's future was in Washington, D.C. Efforts to raise funds for a new, greatly expanded museum in the Boston area had been unsuccessful, and billionaire Ronald Lauder took over responsibility for the Natick museum, which was subsequently closed.

== Philanthropy ==
In 2000, Rendell created an endowment with the Appalachian Mountain Club (AMC) to provide for trail maintenance in the White Mountains of New Hampshire, where he and his sons frequently had hiked. The Jason J. Rendell Endowment also funds AMC activities.

Since the 1990s, Rendell has been a very active supporter of Youth Enrichment Services (YES), in Boston's inner-city neighborhoods, and serves on an advisory board. In Hawaii, where Rendell maintains a home, he has likewise supported the Paia Youth Cultural Center in helping young people develop in a positive way, and two organizations that offer care and hope to the homeless.

Rendell was a founding supporter and on the board of the Rare Book School at Columbia University and continued his support after its move to the University of Virginia. In 2021 he and his wife Shirley McNerney endowed a lecture and publication series on the importance of original manuscripts and rare books to human understanding.

In 2021, the Grolier Club of New York City, the premier organization of manuscript and rare book collectors, announced the major gift of Rendell's collection on the detection of forged handwriting, numbering over 10,000 pieces, including hundreds of original forgeries from the sixteenth century to the present day and thousands of facsimiles of genuine handwriting, reference books, and tools. It is the most comprehensive collection on the subject in the world. In the same year, Rendell and McNerney established an endowed annual lecture at the Grolier Club—the Rendell Lecture on the importance of original manuscripts in understanding the thoughts and intentions of historical persons.

=== The Spark Foundation ===
In 2018, Rendell formulized an idea to help students in the community he grew up in, Somerville, Massachusetts, next to Boston, who were excelling in school but whose economic and social constraints were limiting their potential. The Spark Foundation offers them a broad range of academic and career possibilities and the realization that their place in the world is determined by their efforts and success, not their background. They see that they belong with a wide range of other talented young people. Spark scholarship recipients regularly attend summer sessions at Barnard College, Boston University, Columbia University, Georgetown University, Harvard Medical School, Harvard Business School, Smith College, Stanford University, Tufts University, Wellesley College, Yale University, and many other colleges and universities.

== Personal life ==
Rendell married Diana Angelo in 1967. They had two sons, Jeffrey (b. 1971) and Jason (1982–1998) before divorcing in 1985. He married journalist Shirley McNerney on July 14, 1985; their daughter Julia Louise was born in 1994.

In September 2023, Whitman Publishing released Rendell's memoir Safeguarding History: Trailblazing Adventures in the Worlds of Collecting and Forging History with a foreword by historian Doris Kearns Goodwin.

== Publications ==
- Safeguarding History: Trailblazing Adventures Inside the Worlds of Collecting and Forging History, with a foreword by Doris Kearns Goodwin, Whitman Publishing, 2023.
- The Power of Anti-Semitism: The March to the Holocaust, 1919-1939, companion book to the 2016 New-York Historical Society exhibition, with a foreword by New-York Historical Society President and CEO Louise Mirrer. Boston, 2016.
- Politics, War, and Personality: 50 Iconic Documents of World War II, with a foreword by John Eisenhower. Whitman Publishing, 2013.
- The Great American West: Pursuing the American Dream, with a foreword by Senator Al Simpson. Whitman Publishing, 2013.
- World War II: Saving the Reality, with a foreword by Doris Kearns Goodwin. Whitman Publishing, 2009.
- The Western Pursuit of the American Dream: Selections from the Collection of Kenneth W. Rendell, University of Oklahoma Press, 2004.
- History Comes to Life: Collecting Historical Letters and Documents, University of Oklahoma Press, 1995.
- Forging History: The Detection of Fake Letters and Documents, University of Oklahoma Press, 1994.
- With Weapons and Wits: Propaganda and Psychological Warfare in World War II, Overlord Press, 1992.

Rendell is also co-editor of two books:

- Autographs and Manuscripts: A Collector's Manual, Charles Scribner's Sons, 1978.
- Manuscripts: The First Twenty Years, Greenwood Press, 1984.

Rendell wrote the foreword, consulted, and provided virtually all of the illustrated artifacts for:

- The Secret History of World War II: Spies, Code Breakers, and Covert Operations, National Geographic Books, 2016.
- Atlas of World War II: History's Greatest Conflict Revealed Through Rare Wartime Maps and New Cartography, National Geographic Books, 2018.
- Ronald Reagan: An American Legend, Q. David Bowers, Whitman Publishing, 2011.

== Major articles, papers, and lectures ==
- "The Power and Importance of Handwriting," inaugural Kenneth W. Rendell Lecture on the Importance of Historical Letters and Documents, Grolier Club, October 20, 2022 .
- "The Future of the Manuscript and Rare Book Business," RBM: A Journal of Rare Books, Manuscripts, and Cultural Heritage, Vol. 2, No. 1 (2001): Spring .
- "Future Shock—25 Visions of What's Next," Business 2.0, September 2000.
- "The World of Rare Books and Manuscripts: Changing Concepts of Value and Rarity," address to the Association of college and Research Libraries (ACRL), Chicago, 1985.
- "Ownership of Papers of Public Officials," AB Bookman's Weekly, February 4, 1985.
- "Cracking the Case," Newsweek, May 16, 1983.
- "Tax Appraisals of Manuscript Collections," The American Archivist, (1983) 46 (3): 306–316.
- "The Effects of Investors and Inflation upon the Autograph and Manuscript Field," a paper delivered at the annual meeting of The Manuscript Society, May 1980.
- "Archival Security," a lecture at the annual meeting of The Manuscript Society, published in Manuscripts, Winter 1977.
