= The International Museum of World War II =

Museum in Massachusetts, United States, sold and closed in 2019

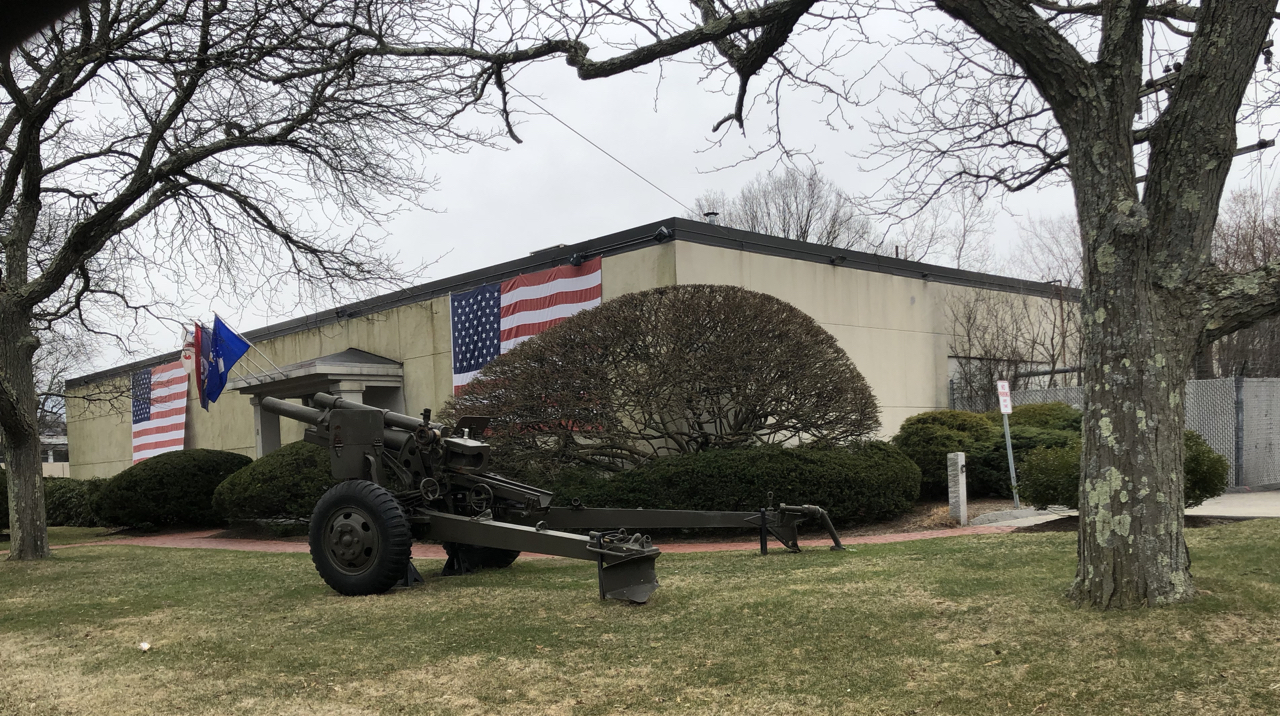
- Former name: Museum of World War II
- Established: 1999
- Dissolved: 2019
- Location: Natick, Massachusetts, U.S.
- Coordinates: 42.29653°N 71.38772°W
- Type: War museum
- Founder: Kenneth W. Rendell
- Website: museumofworldwarii.org

The International Museum of World War II was an American nonprofit war museum devoted to World War II located in Natick, Massachusetts, approximately 15 miles (24 km) west of Boston. Opened in 1999 as the Museum of World War II, it adopted its final name in 2016 to reflect its international collection of letters, documents, and artifacts. The museum closed in 2019.

== History ==
The museum's collection was formed over a period of more than 50 years by its founder, Kenneth W. Rendell, one of the world's premier dealers in autographs, letters and manuscripts, who earned international renown as an authenticator of historic artifacts. The museum's collections documented the events of the war, from the signing of the Treaty of Versailles ending World War I to the Nuremberg and Tokyo war crimes trials. The museum's goal was to preserve the reality of the history of World War II and to provide an educational experience of the lessons to be learned.

On display were over 7,000 artifacts as well 103 mannequins outfitted in complete uniforms and military equipment. Every piece was authentic, from documents with the handwriting of Franklin D. Roosevelt to the actual uniforms worn by concentration camp prisoners. The collections included highly important wartime letters, documents and manuscripts of many of the major political and military leaders, as well as the papers of officers and soldiers of various ranks, concentration camp inmates, and civilians. Adolf Hitler, Roosevelt, Winston Churchill, Dwight D. Eisenhower, George S. Patton, Bernard Montgomery, Joseph Stalin, Erwin Rommel, Benito Mussolini, Joseph Mengele, Adolf Eichmann, Raoul Wallenberg, and Anne Frank's family were all represented in original letters.

The museum was praised for the scope of exhibits in its collection. Rendell stated that "if a visitor is overwhelmed with the enormity and the complexity of the war, I have achieved my goal."

=== Closure ===
On September 1, 2019, the museum closed without prior notice. Much of the museum's collection had been sold to billionaire Ronald Lauder; the agreement to keep the museum open while a new home was found was terminated by Lauder.

A new International Museum of World War II opened in 2019 in Rhode Island. While not affiliated with the Natick museum, it does have some of the artifacts from that site on display.

== Highlights ==
Documents and manuscripts of particular importance included an original copy of the announcement of the Treaty of Versailles with Hitler's earliest handwritten antisemitic words; Hitler's draft of the Munich Agreement with his notations as well as those of Neville Chamberlain; the first message alerting the U.S. Navy of the attack on Pearl Harbor; complete German plans for the invasion of England; General Patton's 1942 letter to the Sultan of Morocco announcing American landings in North Africa and warning him of the consequences of resistance by French forces; General Montgomery's address to British troops before El Alamein; Patton's annotated map for the invasion of Sicily; complete plans for the Allies' D-Day landings at Normandy, France; and General Douglas MacArthur's draft of the Japanese surrender terms.

Among the significant artifacts were Hitler's SA (Sturmabteilung) shirt; his first sketch for the Nazi flag; his reading glasses; Patton's battle helmet; Montgomery's beret; and copies of Mein Kampf that belonged to Hitler, President Roosevelt, and General Patton. There were also six different Enigma code machines, including the ten-rotor T-52, of which only five survive; an American Sherman tank from the North African Campaign; a German Goliath tank used at Normandy; and one of the very few surviving landing craft (LCVP) from the Pacific in near-original condition.

The collections, which were arranged chronologically and geographically, included artifacts, manuscripts, and printed material in the following areas:

- Germany in the Interwar Period
- Adolf Hitler and the Rise of Nazism
- The German Military
- The Munich Agreement and the Fall of France
- Winston Churchill
- The Battle of Britain
- The Resistance Movement
- Occupied Europe
- The Holocaust
- Pearl Harbor and the American Home Front
- The U.S. War Effort
- The Italian Front
- The Russian Front
- D-Day: The Invasion of Normandy
- The Rising Sun and the Aggression in the Far East
- The Pacific Front
- Iwo Jima
- Prisoners of War
- Everybody's War
- German Collapse and Surrender
- The Atomic Bomb
- The Nuremberg War Trials
- The Surrender of Japan
- The Tokyo War Trials
- Cold War Espionage

== Archives ==
The museum's archival collections included:

- More than 500,000 photographs and documents and about 750 photograph albums that documented military and civilian life and activities during World War II.
- Propaganda leaflets dropped by planes over Europe and the Pacific (numbering over 10,000).
- Black propaganda such as forged currency, postage stamps, newspapers, official army discharge documents and identity papers, and fake ration stamps.
- A French museum's collection of newspapers, handbills, posters, documents, leaflets, and other printed pieces documenting the occupation and the French resistance.
- Printed material documenting the German invasion of the Soviet Union, including German plans to strip the nation of its natural resources, a complete set of the invasion maps, and booklets and bombing and artillery target maps.
- An extensive collection of diaries of prisoners of war from both Japanese and German camps, and the assortment of escape devices and forgeries collected by the camp commandant at Colditz.
- The archive of Douglas MacArthur's public relations chief, which documented the general's life and actions from the time of the Japanese air raid on Manila the day after Pearl Harbor to the evacuation of Corregidor, as well as his return to the Philippines and the Japanese surrender.
- D-Day archives containing a comprehensive collection of invasion plans.
- Personal objects owned by Hitler (and his paintings), Roosevelt, Churchill, Eisenhower, and many others.

== Exhibitions ==
Manuscripts and artifacts from the collection have been exhibited at the Imperial War Museum, London; National Archives; West Point; Museum of Our National Heritage; Grolier Club, New York; University of Southern California; the Newseum, Washington, D.C.; the Supreme Court of the United States; the National D-Day Museum, New Orleans; all the U.S. presidential libraries; the CIA Museum; and the German Historical Museum. Manuscripts and artifacts from the museum have been used to illustrate numerous books and articles, and the museum has been featured in documentaries.

"The Power of Words and Images in a World at War," a 2014 exhibition in New York City's Grolier Club, was reviewed by The New York Times, which noted, "It is the ephemera that ends up reviving the past, jolting us into more vivid understanding. And much of what we see in this exhibition does just that. Objects of everyday life during World War II—the posters, the signs, the leaflets, the newspapers, the letters—land on contemporary senses like sparks still smoldering... These artifacts give sharp, incisive glimpses of passions and experiences that can be missed in the larger currents of the war's history. But we also see the war itself unfolding, and in many instances are amazed that we are seeing these artifacts at all.... It manages to give a powerful compact survey, while suggesting how much of that epochal conflict yet remains beyond easy understanding."

On April 12, 2016, "The Power of Anti-Semitism: The March to the Holocaust, 1919-1939," an exhibition developed by Kenneth Rendell from the museum's collections, debuted at the New York Historical Society and ran through July 31. An 80-page companion book of the same name, written by Rendell and Samantha Heywood, was published simultaneously. The Wall Street Journal described the exhibit as "powerful," while the director of the New York Historical Society deemed it "a new—and path-breaking—understanding of the trajectory of anti-Semitism in Europe."

The museum's special exhibitions, based wholly on its own artifacts and documents, have included "Most Secret: Rudolph Hess' Own Archive," "The Reality of the Resistance," "Enigma Code Machines and the Imitation Game," and "Hitler Attacks, Churchill Rises From the Ashes of Appeasement." The most recent, "The 75th Anniversary of Pearl Harbor: Why We Remember," ran from October 8, 2016, through January 7, 2017.

== Proposed expansion ==
The museum had been set to expand in 2017, but fund raising was not successful. With 60,000 square feet (5,600 m^{2}) of space, the proposed new two-story facility would have boasted three times the exhibition space, extensive archives, a library, and the state-of the-art Shipley Education Center. Rendell had announced several developments in mid-2015. Among them was a new partnership with Natick-based technology company MathWorks, which signed on as the museum's first corporate sponsor. In addition, Marshall Carter, formerly the K-8 principal at Milton Academy, joined the museum as its first director of education. Samantha Heywood was hired as museum director and director of exhibitions. Heywood came from London's Imperial War Museum, where she served as director of public programs. Veteran fundraiser Sheila F. Dennis was named the museum's new director of development.

In mid-2018, the bulk of the collection was sold to Ronald Lauder with the idea of moving the collection to a new facility near Washington D.C. In mid-2019, the Natick facility was closed at the insistence of Lauder. The collection was safely moved, but its ultimate fate is unknown.

== Related publications ==
- With Weapons and Wits: Propaganda and Psychological Warfare in World War II (Overlord Press, 1992)
- The Real World War II: Fear On the Home Front, Terror on the Front Lines (American Enterprise Institute, 2002)
- World War II: Saving the Reality, A Collector's Vault (Whitman Publishing, 2009)
- Politics, War and Personality: Fifty Iconic World War II Documents That Changed the World (Whitman Publishing, 2013)
- The Power of Anti-Semitism: The March to the Holocaust, 1919-1939, Boston, 2016
- The Secret History of World War II: Spies, Code Breakers, and Covert Operations, National Geographic Books, 2016
- Atlas of World War II: History's Greatest Conflict Revealed Through Rare Wartime Maps and New Cartography, National Geographic Books, 2018
