= James Prosek =

American artist (born 1975)

- James Prosek
- Born: May 23, 1975 (age 51); Stamford, Connecticut, U.S.
- Education: Yale University
- Known for: Art, Writing, Conservation
- Awards: George Foster Peabody Award (2002)

James Prosek (born May 23, 1975) is an American artist and writer.

Prosek's work explores the distance between the living world and the systems humans use to divide, name, and represent it—testing those systems against the world itself. Rooted in close observation and field experience, his practice moves between order and mystery, attending to what names and images can reveal and what inevitably escapes them.

== Early Life and Education ==
Prosek was born in Connecticut in 1975 and grew up in Easton, where he continues to live and work. His father was born in Santos, Brazil, and his mother in Prague, Czechoslovakia.

As a child, Prosek became absorbed by the trout he caught in streams near his home. Unable to find a book of all the trout of North America, he decided to make one himself, setting out to paint them in watercolor. At about ten, he began researching the fish and writing to wildlife departments around the country, asking what native trout lived there and trying to assemble a list of the trout he hoped to paint. He soon discovered that the experts did not always agree on how many species there were, where one ended and another began, or even how a species should be defined. As a teenager, Prosek traveled across North America with a fly rod to encounter the fish himself. He came to realize that the book he wanted to make did not require consensus. Even as uncertainty surrounded their names and boundaries, he could paint the trout he caught from particular river drainages and document the history of those who had tried to name and order them.

Prosek attended Yale University, where he studied English literature and was a member of Manuscript Society. He studied with literary critic Harold Bloom, who became his senior-thesis adviser and mentor.

While still an undergraduate at Yale, Prosek submitted his trout project unsolicited to ten publishers. The proposal was pulled from the slush pile at Random House and reached Knopf editor Gary Fisketjon, who became Prosek's first editor. Knopf published the project as Trout: An Illustrated History in 1996, a book of Prosek's watercolor paintings of seventy North American trout species, subspecies, and strains. The book received widespread national attention, including coverage in People and appearances by Prosek on NPR's All Things Considered, CBS Sunday Morning, and NBC Nightly News. Prosek later said that the response to the book gave him the opportunity to continue making art and writing and “changed the course of my life.” He graduated from Yale in 1997.

== Visual art ==
=== Life & Death: A Visual Taxonomy ===
Prosek's first solo museum exhibition, James Prosek: Life & Death—A Visual Taxonomy, was presented at the Aldrich Contemporary Art Museum in 2007–08. Bringing together paintings, sculpture, taxidermic specimens, and large-scale wall murals, the exhibition explored naming, representation, and systems of order.

In works adapted from Roger Tory Peterson's field guides, Prosek retained numbered bird silhouettes while eliminating the corresponding identification key, placing viewers, in the Aldrich's words, in “the less comfortable position of not knowing.” The exhibition explored the possibility of looking at living things outside established systems of nomenclature and classification. By juxtaposing painted and sculpted representations with preserved specimens, it also complicated distinctions among living things, specimens, and images.

Discussing the exhibition the following year with Krista Tippett on the public-radio program Speaking of Faith, Prosek described the usefulness and limitations of naming. “Of course, we need names to communicate,” he said, “but I think sometimes names can get in the way of how we view the world.” Reflecting more broadly on the human impulse to impose order on nature, he said, “The real myth is the myth of order.” The conversation placed these questions within Prosek's broader interest in mystery, spirituality, and the meanings humans attach to other living things.

=== Field guides and representation ===
For the Smithsonian American Art Museum exhibition The Singing and the Silence: Birds in Contemporary Art in 2014–15, Prosek created the panoramic mural What once was is no more: Passing like a thought, flight into memory. The work depicts passenger pigeons moving through American chestnut trees and borrows the numbered silhouettes of traditional field guides while deliberately omitting the corresponding identification key. The absence of the key frustrates the usual process of identification and naming, redirecting attention toward the act of looking.

Other works from this period similarly used conventions of field guides and museum display while removing or disrupting the systems through which their subjects would ordinarily be identified. Prosek increasingly emphasized the physical particularities of individual specimens rather than presenting an idealized representative of a named type.

=== Invisible Boundaries ===
Prosek subsequently collaborated with ecologists, photographers, filmmakers, and museums on projects concerning wildlife migration and human boundaries. Invisible Boundaries: Exploring Yellowstone's Great Animal Migrations, presented at the Buffalo Bill Center of the West in 2016, developed from field research with ecologist Arthur Middleton, photographer Joe Riis, filmmaker Jenny Nichols, and others studying wildlife migrations through the Greater Yellowstone Ecosystem.

The project examined animals whose movements cross political, administrative, and property boundaries surrounding Yellowstone National Park. It extended questions Prosek had articulated earlier about the instability of categories and boundaries. In his 2008 conversation with Tippett, he observed, “Nothing is static. Nothing can fit in a box. Everything's moving. Everything's migrating, even humans.”

=== Art, Artifact, Artifice and Bird Spectrum ===
Bird Spectrum (2019), more than 200 bird specimens from the Yale Peabody Museum arranged by color rather than taxonomy and displayed at the Yale University Art Gallery.

In 2020, the Yale University Art Gallery organized James Prosek: Art, Artifact, Artifice, bringing Prosek's work together with objects selected from the Yale University Art Gallery, Yale Peabody Museum, and Yale Center for British Art. The exhibition examined distinctions between categories including art and artifact, natural and human-made, and named and unnamed, while also considering mark-making, hybridity, representation, and the human desire for order.

A centerpiece of the exhibition was Bird Spectrum (2019), an installation at the Yale University Art Gallery composed of more than 200 preserved bird specimens from the Yale Peabody Museum. Rather than arranging the specimens according to evolutionary relationships, as they were ordinarily organized within the museum collection, Prosek arranged them as a continuous color spectrum.

In assembling the work, Prosek found that individual specimens did not fall neatly into discrete bands of color. The resulting gradations became an analogy for the difficulty of drawing precise boundaries within other continuous systems. Prosek compared the absence of a single point at which, for example, red becomes orange with the difficulty of locating fixed divisions within evolutionary continua.

The exhibition extended these questions beyond biological categories. Works of art appeared alongside specimens, artifacts, tools, archaeological objects, and other materials, allowing similarities of form, mark, material, and function to compete with the institutional categories normally separating them.

=== Grasslands and Trespassers ===
Prosek's exhibition Trespassers: James Prosek and the Texas Prairie at the Amon Carter Museum of American Art in 2023–24 developed through two years of fieldwork in Texas grassland environments and included large-scale silhouette paintings, watercolor portraits of individual plants, murals, and trompe-l'oeil clay and bronze sculptures of wildflowers.

The project considered the boundaries humans use to shape, limit, and define prairie landscapes. Prosek's plant portraits retained insect damage, broken stems, and other irregularities of individual specimens that are often removed from generalized representations.

Reviewing the exhibition in The Brooklyn Rail, Andrew Paul Woolbright characterized Prosek's watercolors as occupying a space between field journal and ecological portraiture, noting their attention to the particular histories visible in individual plants. He described the sculptures as creating a tension between artifice and nature, with the museum functioning in part as a laboratory for examining that relationship.

Following the exhibition, Prosek received a commission from Ed and Sasha Bass and Sundance Square for a monumental hand-painted prairie mural in downtown Fort Worth. Completed in 2025, the mural covers approximately 5,000 square feet atop the Westbrook building, extending roughly 300 feet in length and 15 feet in height and depicting more than 100 species of native Texas prairie plants. Sundance Square has described the work as the world's largest prairie mural.

=== Memory, Trees & Shadows ===
Ouroboros No. 1 (2026), an oversized wooden pencil forming an almost complete circle, with its graphite point and eraser nearly meeting.

In 2026, the Edward Hopper House Museum & Study Center presented James Prosek: Memory, Trees & Shadows, an exhibition of more than twenty works in watercolor, painting, and sculpture. The exhibition extended Prosek's concerns into memory, shadows, and mark-making, while placing his work in dialogue with Edward Hopper and Josephine Nivison Hopper.

At the center of the exhibition was Memory of Shadow No. 2 (2025–26), consisting of a bronze cast of a tree stump accompanied by an approximately twelve-foot cut-steel representation of the shadow of the absent tree. The work continued Prosek's interest in shadows as both physical phenomena and forms of representation—a two-dimensional trace produced by a three-dimensional object. A substantially larger related sculpture, The Memory of Shadows No. 1 (2025), extends forty feet in bronze and hot-rolled steel and was acquired by the Hood Museum of Art at Dartmouth College for its permanent collection.

Remnant (2026), oil on canvas.

The exhibition also included Remnant (2026), an oil painting depicting the shadow of a tree falling across a red barn. Writing in National Review, critic Brian T. Allen called the painting “about as enigmatic and intense a work of art as I've seen in a long time,” describing its tree shadow as “unintentional art.”

Another sculpture takes the form of an oversized wooden pencil forming an almost complete circle, with its graphite point and eraser nearly meeting. Allen interpreted the pencil in relation to writing, communication, enclosure, continuation, and erasure, observing of its circular form that it “isn't closed. It can't ever be closed.”

Also in 2026, the Vero Beach Museum of Art presented James Prosek: At Work, a survey of more than 70 works spanning the first 30 years of Prosek's practice. Organized by the Morris Museum, the exhibition brought together field studies and studio works in painting, watercolor, and sculpture, tracing projects from the early 2000s through the present.

Prosek's work has been exhibited at institutions including the Smithsonian American Art Museum, Yale University Art Gallery, Philadelphia Museum of Art, Amon Carter Museum of American Art, Aldrich Contemporary Art Museum, Addison Gallery of American Art, North Carolina Museum of Art, Buffalo Bill Center of the West, Asia Society Hong Kong Center, National Academy of Sciences, Royal Academy of Arts in London, and Edward Hopper House Museum & Study Center.

He has been an artist-in-residence at the Yale University Art Gallery, Isabella Stewart Gardner Museum, and Addison Gallery of American Art.

== Writing and film ==
Prosek has written more than a dozen books for adults and children, as well as essays combining observation, travel, memoir, art, and encounters with landscapes and other living things.

His second book, Joe and Me: An Education in Fishing and Friendship (1997), is a memoir about his relationship with Connecticut game warden Joe Haines. Reviewing the book in The New York Times, Christopher Lehmann-Haupt wrote that Prosek painted “with language as simply and refreshingly as he does with watercolors.”

His 2010 book Eels: An Exploration, from New Zealand to the Sargasso, of the World's Most Mysterious Fish followed the animal through scientific research, fisheries, mythology, food traditions, and cultures in locations including New Zealand, Micronesia, Japan, Europe, and the United States. The book was selected as a New York Times Book Review Editors' Choice and later became the basis for a documentary for the PBS series Nature.

Prosek also wrote and appeared in The Complete Angler, a documentary retracing the travels of seventeenth-century writer and angler Izaak Walton, author of The Compleat Angler. The film received a Peabody Award. The Peabody committee described the program as concerned as much with “a philosophy of life as about fishing” and called it an “exquisite video tone poem.”

His essays have appeared in publications including The New York Times and National Geographic, among others. His later essays have continued to address questions of art, language, representation, and communication. In “Deaf Man on a River” (2026), an essay on artist Joseph Grigely, who has been deaf since childhood, Prosek described representation as existing in “the gap between a thing and the sign we use to stand in for it.” He connected Grigely's practice to his own longstanding interest in “the gap between the word and the world,” arguing that the incompleteness of language can be generative rather than merely limiting.

== Influences and Approach ==
Prosek's artistic influences range from traditions of observational drawing and watercolor to modern and contemporary art concerned with language, signs, objects, and representation. In the catalogue accompanying Art, Artifact, Artifice, curator Edith Devaney described him as being “as fascinated by art-historical lineage as he is by references pertaining to nature.”

In a 2022 essay, Prosek wrote that encountering Winslow Homer's watercolors at the Yale University Art Gallery when he was eleven “changed my life”; he subsequently learned watercolor in part by copying Homer's paintings of leaping brook trout. In 2025–26, the Museum of Fine Arts, Boston featured Prosek in the film Winslow Homer: A Legacy in Watercolor, produced in conjunction with its exhibition Of Light and Air: Winslow Homer in Watercolor. The film followed Prosek as he studied works from the MFA's Homer collection, visited Homer's studio at Prouts Neck, Maine, and made a watercolor using techniques associated with Homer. Prosek has also cited John James Audubon and Louis Agassiz Fuertes as early influences.

Other artists discussed in relation to Prosek's work include Albrecht Dürer, René Magritte, Jasper Johns, Charles Burchfield, and Martin Puryear. His fish impressions also draw on the Japanese practice of gyotaku.

Literature has also been important to Prosek's practice. His father read poetry aloud to him as a child, including Robert Frost, Emily Dickinson, William Wordsworth, John Keats, Percy Bysshe Shelley, and Lord Byron; Prosek later studied English literature and the Romantic poets at Yale. His visual and written work has continued to engage writers including Frost, Keats, Dickinson, and John Milton. Across these artistic and literary references, recurring concerns include observation and mark-making, the ambiguity of boundaries, and the space between words, images, and the things they seek to describe.

== Conservation and Field Research ==
In 2004, Prosek co-founded World Trout with Yvon Chouinard, founder of Patagonia, an initiative supporting cold-water habitat conservation.

Field research has remained integral to Prosek's practice. His projects have involved extended work with biologists, ecologists, museum collections, and conservation organizations and have included research on wildlife migration in the Greater Yellowstone Ecosystem and grassland environments in Texas.

Prosek is a curatorial affiliate and member of the Leadership Council of the Yale Peabody Museum and serves on the advisory board of the Yale Institute for Biospheric Studies.

== Critical Reception ==
Critical responses to Prosek's work have frequently addressed the relationship between his writing and visual art and the difficulty of placing his practice within a single category.

In a 1999 profile in The New York Observer, when Prosek was 23, he said, “Society and the public tend to label and pigeonhole people,” adding that he preferred not to be pigeonholed.

Literary critic Harold Bloom, who taught Prosek at Yale and became his senior-thesis adviser and mentor, described him following the publication of Joe and Me as “a writer at once artful and natural, an original in literature even as he is in painting.”

Reviewing Eels in The New York Times Book Review, Paul Greenberg connected Prosek's writing and painting, writing that both draw their inspiration from “a similar challenge: to express the ineffable.” He described the book as having “the feeling of bright colors slipping through your fingers.”

In the catalogue for Art, Artifact, Artifice, Yale University Art Gallery chief curator Laurence Kanter described Prosek's practice as moving among close observation, mythology, evolutionary theory, color, and perception. “He makes those paths beautiful,” Kanter wrote. “He turns them into art.”

Writing about Prosek in 2019, art historian Brian T. Allen emphasized the difficulty of categorizing his practice. Comparing Prosek's position outside conventional artistic categories to that of British artist Grayson Perry, Allen wrote, “Perry and Prosek don't just challenge the conventional. They ignore it.”

== Bibliography ==
- Trout: An Illustrated History (Knopf, 1996) ISBN 9780679444534
- The Complete Angler: A Connecticut Yankee Follows in the Footsteps of Walton (Harper, 1999) ISBN 9780060191894
- Early Love and Brook Trout (Lyons, 2000) ISBN 9781585740390
- Joe and Me: An Education in Fishing and Friendship – A Ranger Mentor's Story That Changed One Life (Harper Perennial, 2003) ISBN 9780060537845
- Fly-Fishing the 41st: From Connecticut to Mongolia and Home Again: A Fisherman's Odyssey – A Literary Travel Journey Through Global Cultures and Memorable Characters (HarperCollins, 2004) ISBN 9780060193799
- Good Day's Fishing (Simon & Schuster Books for Young Readers, 2004) ISBN 9780689853272
- The Day My Mother Left (Simon & Schuster Books for Young Readers, 2007) ISBN 9781416907701
- Bird, Butterfly, Eel (Simon & Schuster Books for Young Readers, 2009) ISBN 9780689868290
- Eels: An Exploration, From New Zealand to the Sargasso, of the World's Most Mysterious Fish (Harper Perennial, 2011) ISBN 9780060566128
- Ocean Fishes: Paintings of Saltwater Fish (Rizzoli, 2012) ISBN 9780847839070
- Trout of the World: Revised and Updated Edition (2013) ISBN 9781617690235
- Grasslands: Painting the American Prairie (Rizzoli, 2024) ISBN 9780847830565
