= Insectothopter =

American UAV

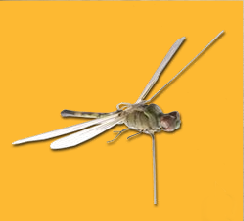
An image of the Insectothopter from the CIA's Virtual Museum.

The Insectothopter was a miniature unmanned aerial vehicle developed by the United States Central Intelligence Agency's research and development office in the 1970s. The Insectothopter was the size of a dragonfly, and was hand-painted to look like one. It was powered by a miniature fluidic oscillator to propel the wings up and down at the proper rate to provide both lift and thrust. A small amount of propellant produced gas to drive the oscillator, and extra thrust came from the excess gas vented out the rear. The project was abandoned when the Insectothopter was found to be too difficult to control in crosswinds. It was revealed to the public in December 2003 at the CIA Museum, and further details about the project were declassified in 2015 and 2020.

== See also ==
- Ornithopter
