= T13 Beano grenade =

American experimental grenade

T13 Beano
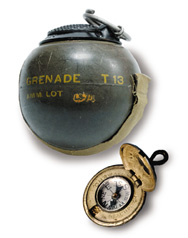
- A T13 "Beano" (top) alongside a compass hidden in a button, from the CIA Museum
- Place of origin: United States

Service history
- Wars: World War II

Production history
- Designer: Office of Strategic Services
- Manufacturer: Eastman Kodak

Specifications
- Mass: 12 ounces (340 g)

The T13 Beano (sometimes capitalized as "BEANO") was an experimental grenade developed by the Office of Strategic Services (OSS; later became the Central Intelligence Agency), with assistance from the Eastman Kodak Corporation, during World War II. Intentionally designed to resemble a baseball under the expectation that American soldiers would already be familiarized with its use, the T13 used a special fuse and a unique arming mechanism to ensure it would detonate on impact. Development of the T13 began in 1943 or 1944, and proved promising enough that limited examples were field-tested on the Western Front in 1945, but accidental casualties during testing led to the program's discontinuation by the end of World War II. The T13 is not known to have seen any actual combat or operational usage, and most non-inert examples were destroyed after the war's conclusion.

== Design ==
The T13 was intended to be nearly identical to the size and weight of a common baseball, with a mass of 12 ounces (340 g). It was therefore designed to be very compact, and was to be thrown like pitching a baseball, which gave it an effective radius of approximately 20 meters.

To prime the T13, the wielder would press down on the knurled "butterfly cap" on the top, pull the pin, and throw the grenade. The butterfly cap would become separated from the grenade in flight, exposing a nylon string to the wind. This string would then unwind and pull a secondary pin, arming the grenade. Once fully armed, the T13 would detonate on impact; this was to ensure enemy personnel could not throw the grenade back like they could with conventional grenades using timed fuses. The OSS requested that the T13 be able to "reliably detonate when dropped from a height of 18 inches onto sponge rubber".

== Development ==
American involvement in World War II involved a massive induction of volunteering and conscripted recruits from across American society. In 1943, the OSS and the United States Army Ordnance Department sought to research the potential for introducing a new design of hand grenade that these soldiers would be more familiar with. This new grenade, later nicknamed the "Beano" (Note: Etymology unclear, but possibly derived from the baseball term "beanball", referring to a ball thrown at a player to hit them and cause harm.), was to be an impact grenade, like the No. 69 grenade used by the British Army, but instead of the more oblong designs of the No. 69 and the American Mk 2 grenade, the OSS opted to model their new grenade after a baseball, as they presumed the men being inducted would have played baseball (a very popular sport and pastime in the United States), and would thus be more familiar with using it. It was hoped this would allow soldiers to throw the grenade farther and with greater accuracy, while also allowing OSS operatives to conceal it better and use it to quickly destroy enemy materiel in sabotage operations.

Eastman Kodak was contracted with producing 2,000 initial Beano examples to ensure it met OSS specifications, at their secret "Lincoln" facility in Rochester, New York. British impact grenades such as the No. 69, as well as some examples of Italian grenades, were studied for the Beano's development. Ammonium picrate was used as the initial filling, but testing found that the resulting grenade was too sensitive and would detonate from a 6-inch drop onto sponge rubber, so the arming mechanism was improved and the filling was changed to Composition A. The Ordnance Department designated the Beano as the "Grenade, Hand, Fragmentation, T12 using Fuze, Grenade, Impact T5" in January 1944.

=== Testing ===
Testing of the Beano began at Aberdeen Proving Ground in March 1944 and proved satisfactory enough for live tests by Army infantry to begin at Fort Benning. Despite some minor casualties from dropped grenades, and duds due to the fuse freezing during cold-weather warfare testing, the Army approved the T13 on June 2, 1944 and ordered 825,000 units for the OSS, Army, and Marine Corps. A civilian fatality during testing on November 3, 1944, when a T13 thrown straight up by the civilian detonated on their head, prompted a cessation in production for the T5 fuse to be improved upon. Still, 10,000 T13s were sent for field tests on the Western Front in February 1945. Over the next month of field use, the T13 was found to have a 10% failure rate, attributed to landing on surfaces that were too soft for the grenade to detonate properly. Worse, however, were reports that five premature detonations had killed 2 soldiers and injured 44 others, prompting General Joseph Stilwell to order the total suspension of the Beano project on March 29, 1945. Anthony Dee, writing in Small Arms Review in a 2003 retrospective on the Beano, described it as "hold[ing] the dubious distinction of having killed and injured more of our own personnel than of the enemy". It is unclear if the T13 was ever used in combat.

=== Cancellation ===
On June 15, 1945, production of the T13 was ceased entirely, with all existing stock to be destroyed or stored until a safer fuse could be designed. Attempts at introducing alternative Beanos, including flash powder and white phosphorus variants, and models with a timed fuse or a spoon-type safety lever similar to that on the Mk 2 grenade, were not developed further. The last standard Beano model, the T13E3, was intended to have "cured" the existing premature detonation issue, but its design introduced a new flaw where the T13E3 could accidentally detonate if the butterfly cap was not held down.

The cancellation of Operation Downfall and the end of World War II in September 1945 meant there was no longer an immediate need for the T13, and development ceased. As the program and its records were largely classified, and the T13 proved too dangerous and unpredictable for further use, the vast majority of its stock was destroyed. Few examples survive into the 21st century, mostly inert testing and training models, and they are considered especially rare by collectors.

== T15 offensive grenade ==
The T15 offensive grenade was a later development of the T13's rounded design that included features such as a textured body and a simpler percussion timed fuse under a protective screw cap. This design was only developed experimentally and was never adopted for use.
