= CIA Museum =

American intelligence museum in Langley

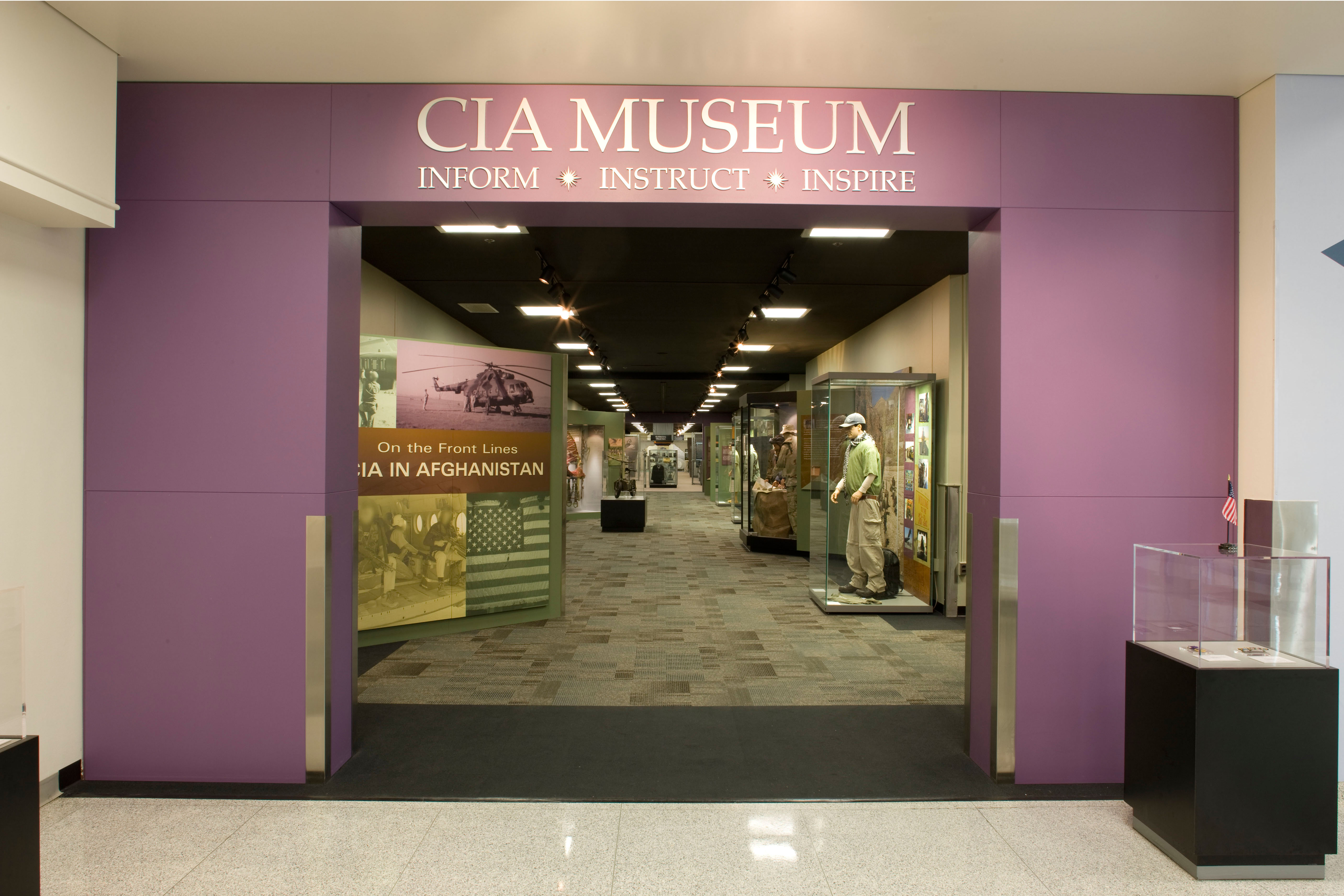

- Location within Virginia
- Established: June 2002
- Location: Langley, Virginia
- Coordinates: 38.9518°N 77.1465°W
- Collections: Clothing, equipment, memorabilia, weapons, and insignia
- Collection size: >3500 artifacts
- Director: Robert Z Byer
- Owners: Central Intelligence Agency, US government
- Website: www.cia.gov/legacy/museum/

The CIA Museum, administered by the Center for the Study of Intelligence, a department of the Central Intelligence Agency, is a US archive for the collection, preservation, documentation and exhibition of intelligence artifacts, culture, and history. The collection, which in 2005 numbered 3,500 items, consists of artifacts that have been declassified; however, since the museum is on the compound of the George Bush Center for Intelligence, it is not accessible to the public.

Since the museum cannot be visited by the public, the CIA Museum has partnerships with Presidential Libraries and other major museums and institutions to develop public exhibitions about intelligence and its role in America. The CIA Museum has counterparts at other agencies in the United States Intelligence Community. The National Cryptologic Museum (which is open to the public in Annapolis Junction, Maryland) is the NSA counterpart to the CIA Museum and focuses on cryptology as opposed to human intelligence.

The DIA Museum (Defense Intelligence Agency) is not public, is housed at its headquarters and focuses on the history of military intelligence and DIA's role. The FBI Museum housed at its headquarters is also off-limits to the public, and is focused on its history as a federal law enforcement, counterintelligence, and counter-terrorism organization.

== Collection ==
The CIA Museum's scope of collection includes material associated with all activities of the CIA's predecessor, the Office of Strategic Services (OSS), material associated with activities of foreign intelligence organizations, and material associated with the history and mission of the Central Intelligence Agency. Articles in the Museum Collection include clothing, equipment, weapons, memorabilia, and insignia designed, manufactured, or used by intelligence organizations historically and presently. The Collection also includes unique items such as weapons, clothing, and equipment developed specifically through research and development, or manufactured by units or individuals to further the mission of intelligence operations. The museum also displays Osama bin Laden's AK-47 along with a brick from the compound in which he was found at the time of his death.

In September 2022, to mark the agency's 75th anniversary, a small group of journalists were given access to the museum. BBC journalist Gordon Corera mentioned seeing "cold war spy gadgets" such as "'dead drop rat' in which messages could be hidden, a covert camera inside a cigarette packet, a pigeon with its own spy-camera and even an exploding martini glass."

== Exhibits ==
As of 2017, The CIA Museum maintains three exhibits of important historical intelligence artifacts at CIA Headquarters in Langley, Virginia. Dedicated in June 2002 to commemorate the 60th Anniversary of the Office of Strategic Services, the CIA Museum's North Gallery houses an exhibit devoted to preserving the legacy CIA inherited from the OSS. The exhibit displays personal memorabilia from Major General William J. Donovan, the founder of the Office of Strategic Services, examples of OSS equipment, and a German Enigma enciphering machine from World War II. The Cold War Gallery was established in collaboration with collector and historian H. Keith Melton in 1997. The Cold War: Fifty Years of Silent Conflict showcases many of the 7,000 clandestine espionage artifacts from the United States, the former Soviet Union, and East Germany, which form the world's largest private collection of spy gear. Analysis Informing American Policy, located in the Fine Arts Exhibit Hall, celebrates the 50th anniversary of the creation of the CIAs predecessor, the Directorate of Intelligence (1952).

Exhibits

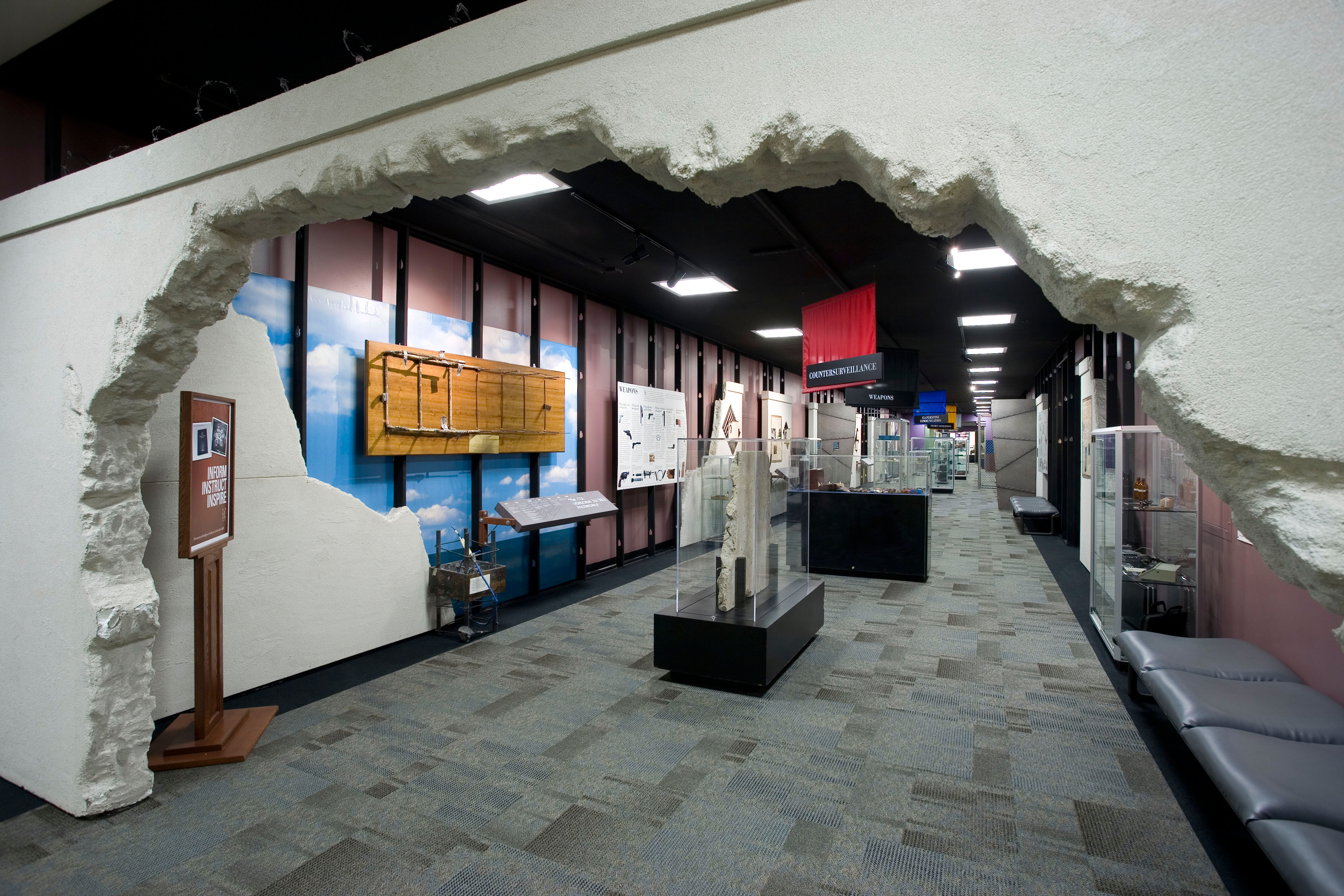
Cold War Gallery

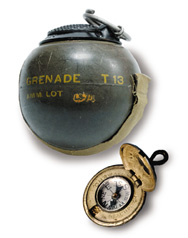
The OSS A Beano grenade; a compass hidden in a uniform button

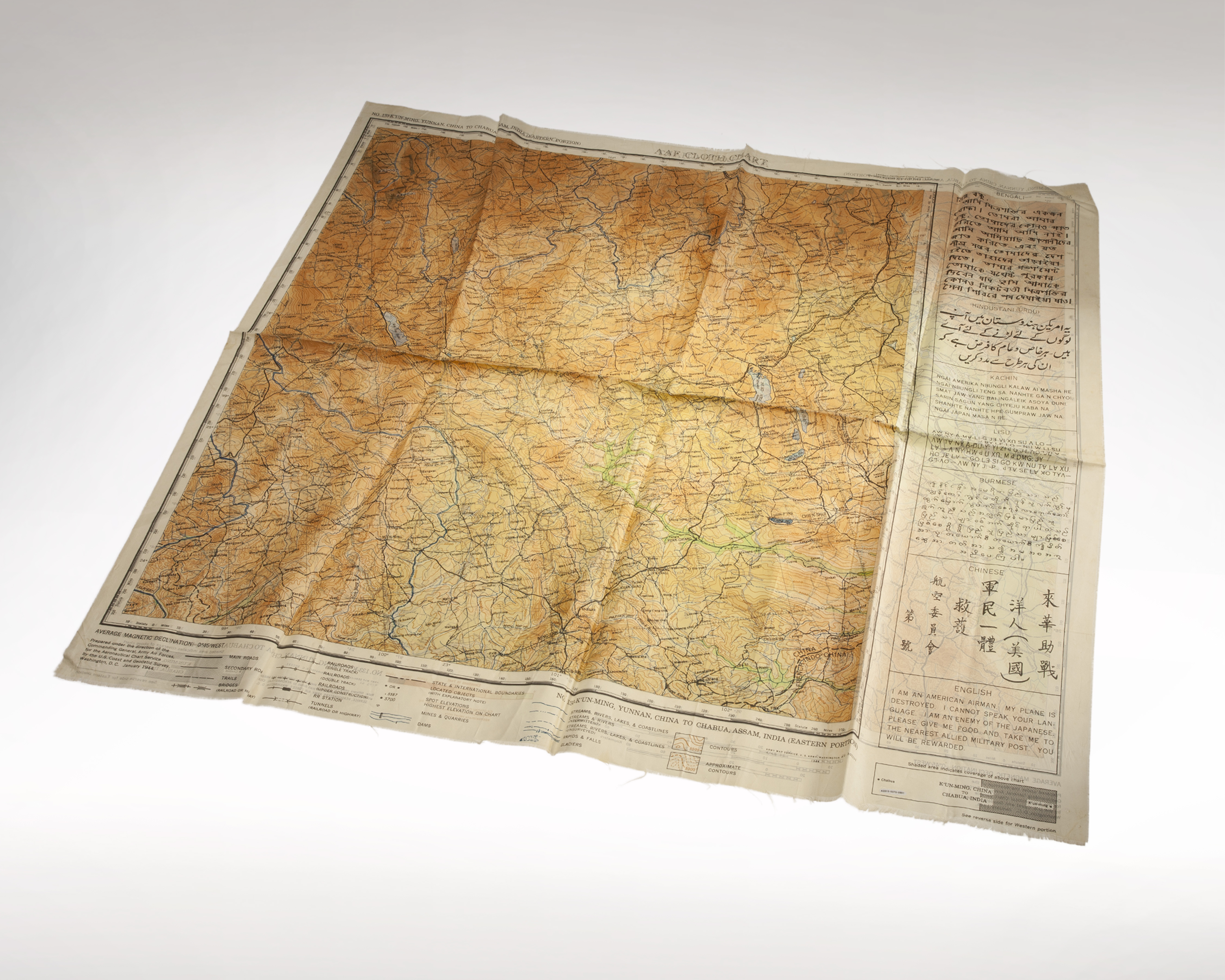
Silk Escape and evasion map, Office of Strategic Services

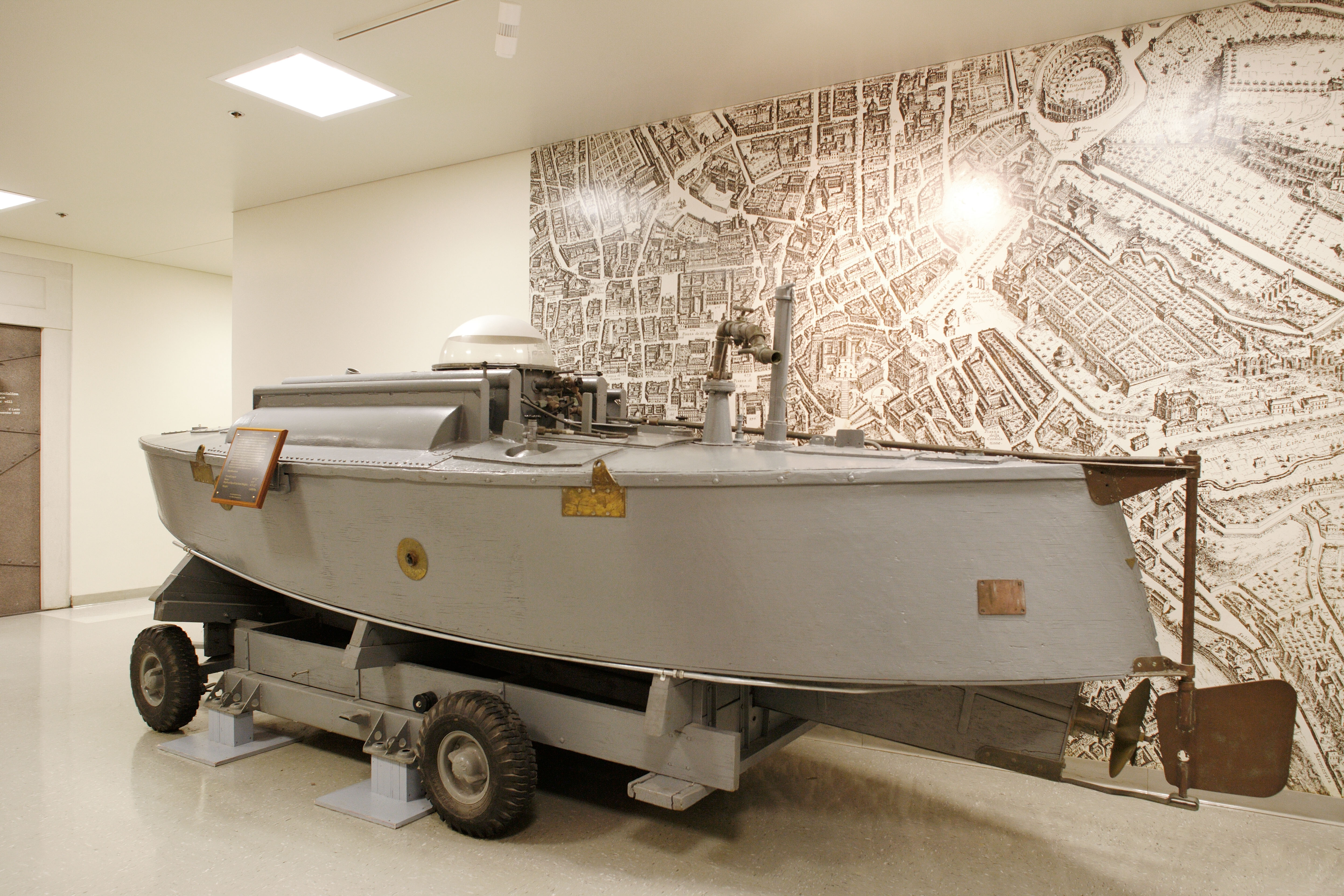
The CIA designed and manufactured this two-man semi-submersible in the 1950s.

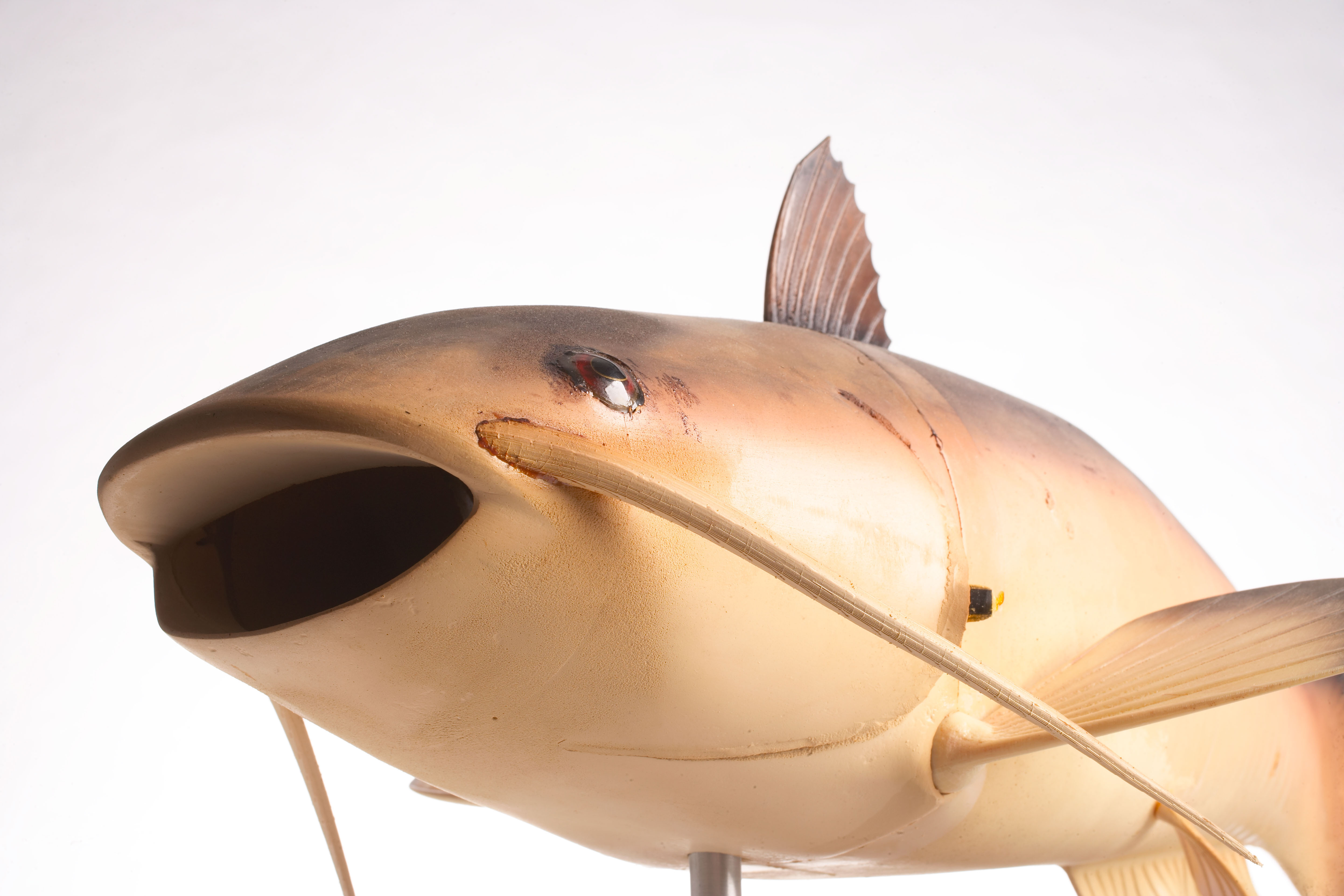
Robot Fish Charlie, Unmanned Underwater Vehicle (UUV) fish

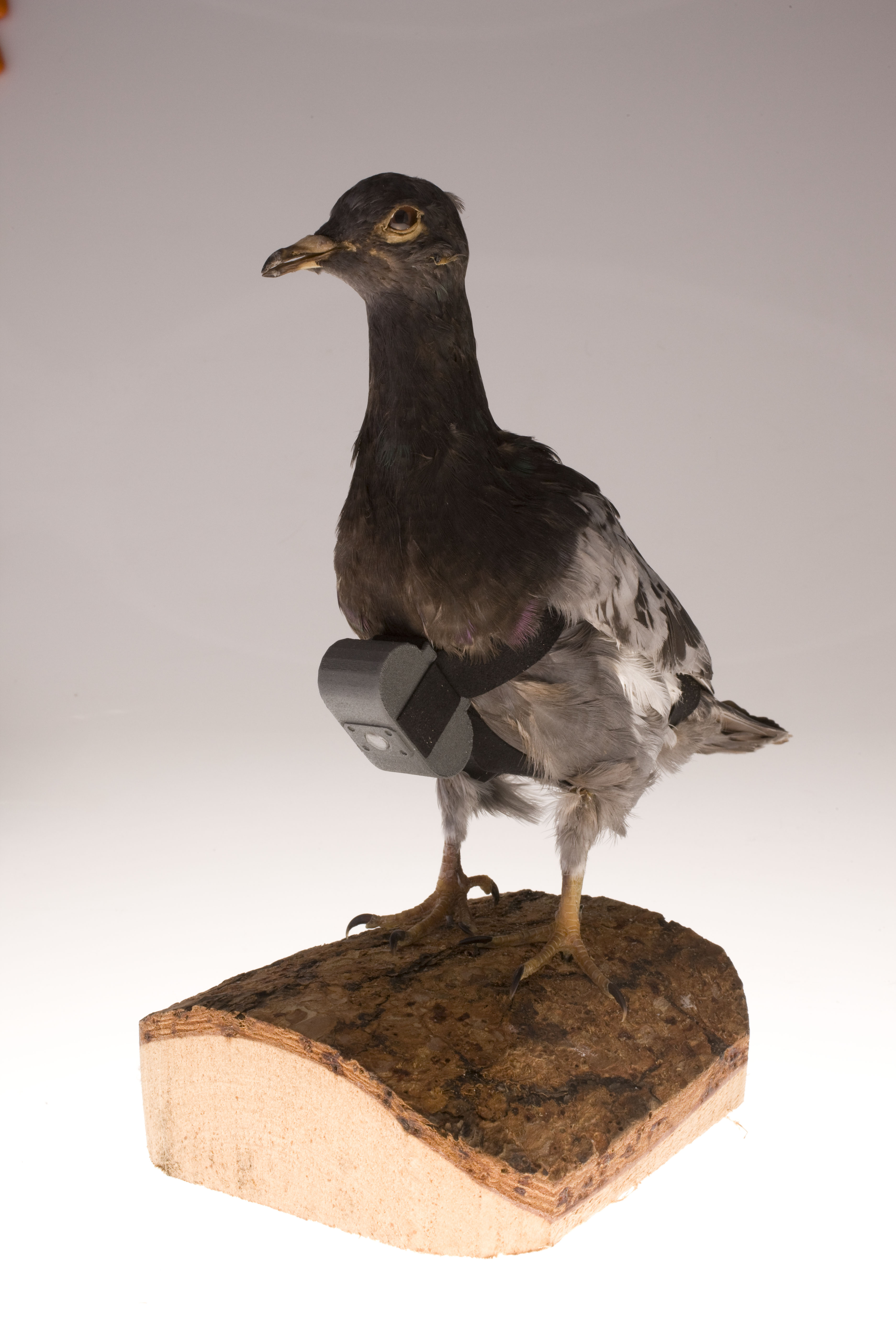
Pigeon Camera, designed in the 1970s

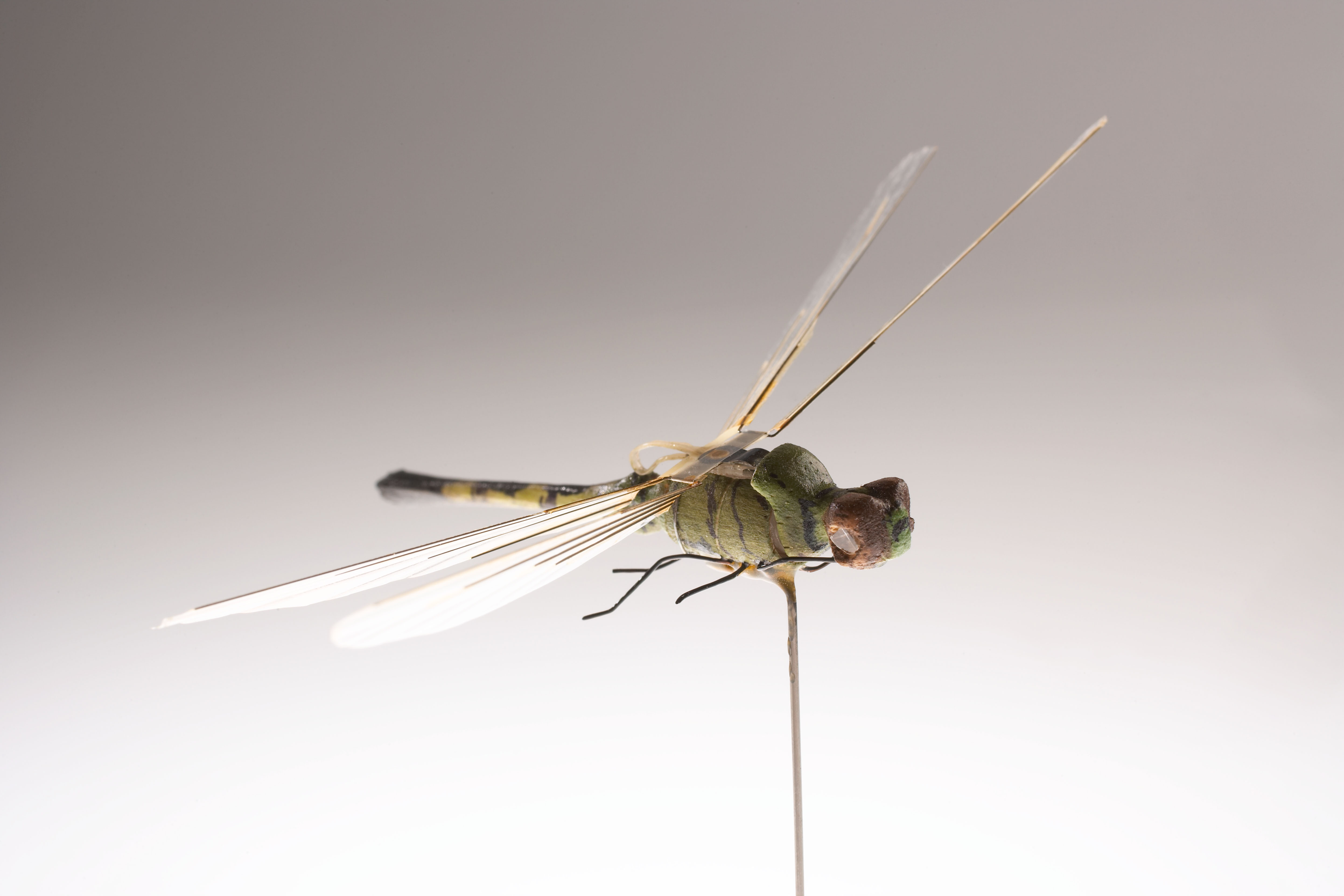
Developed in the 1970s, this micro Unmanned Aerial Vehicle (UAV) was the first flight of an insect-sized Micro air vehicle (Insectothopter).

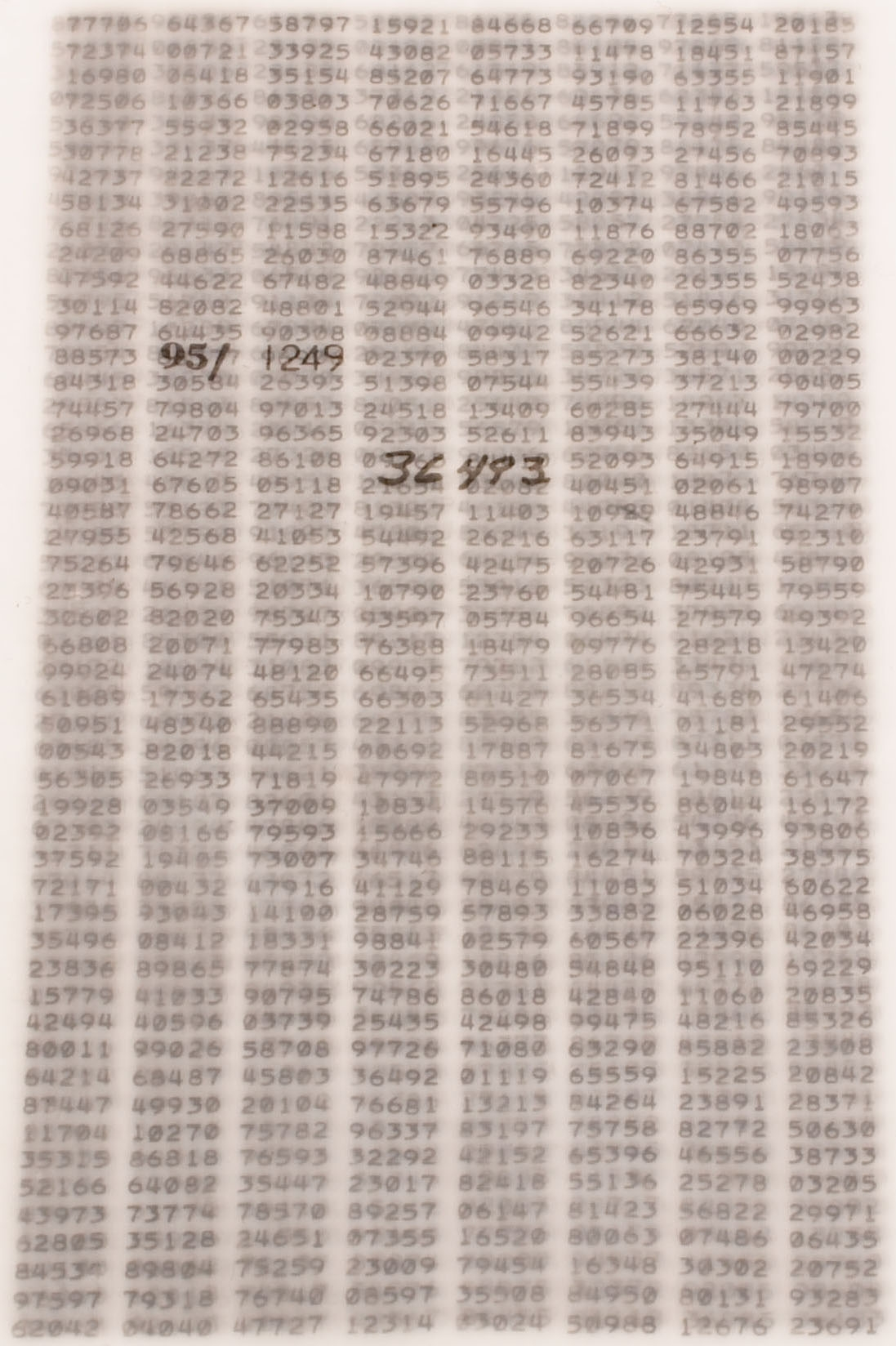
One-time pad

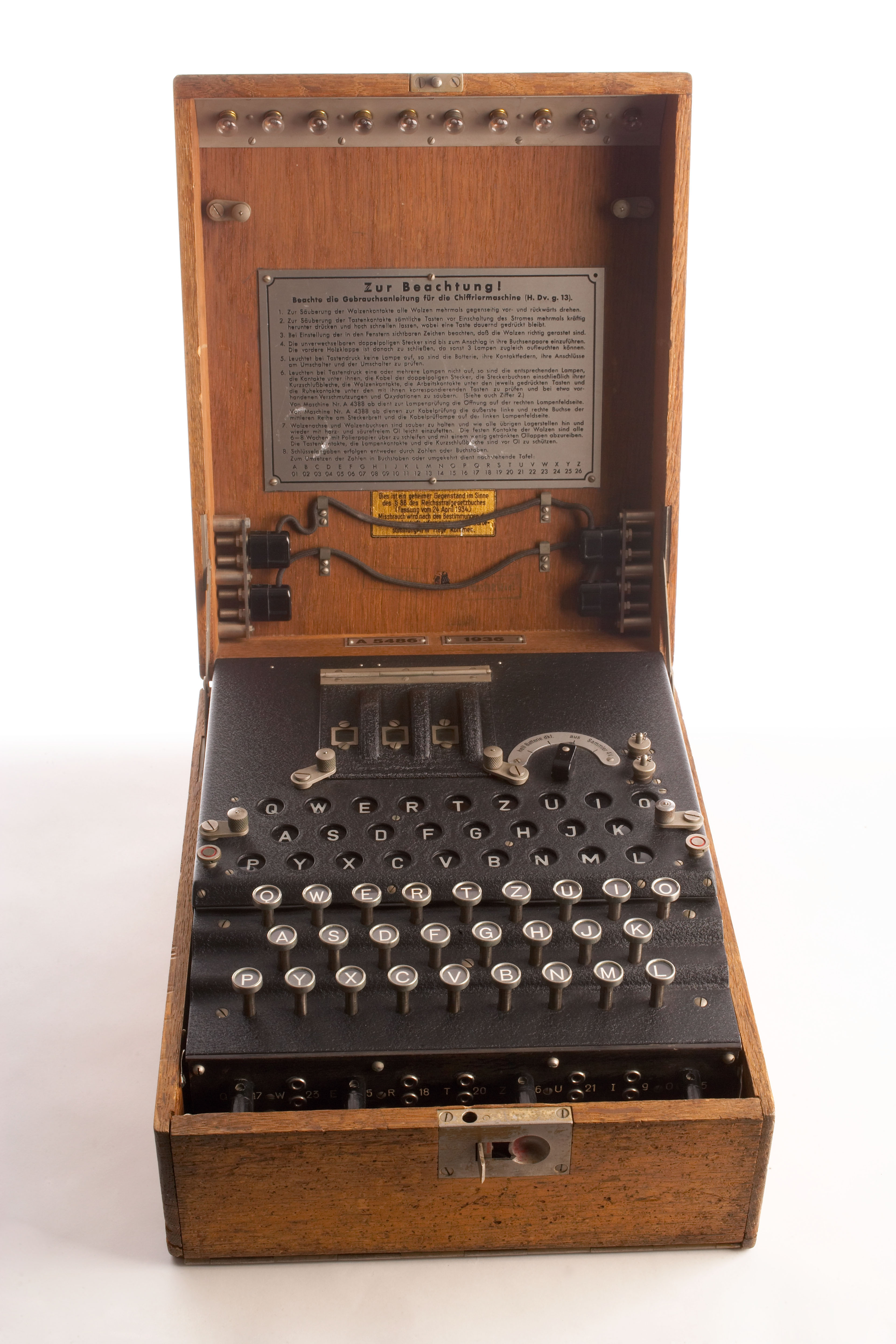
World War 2 era German Enigma Machine

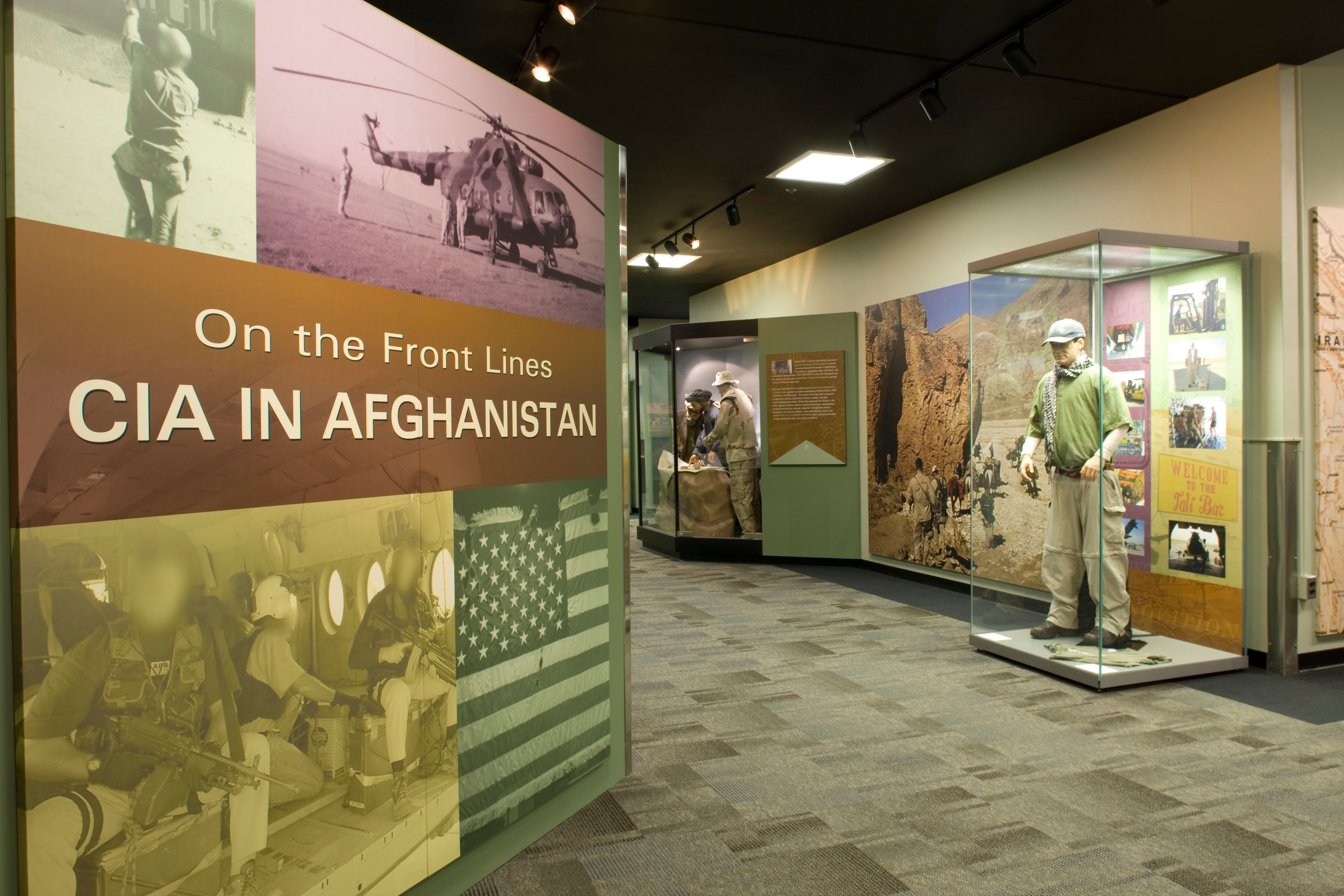
Afghan Gallery

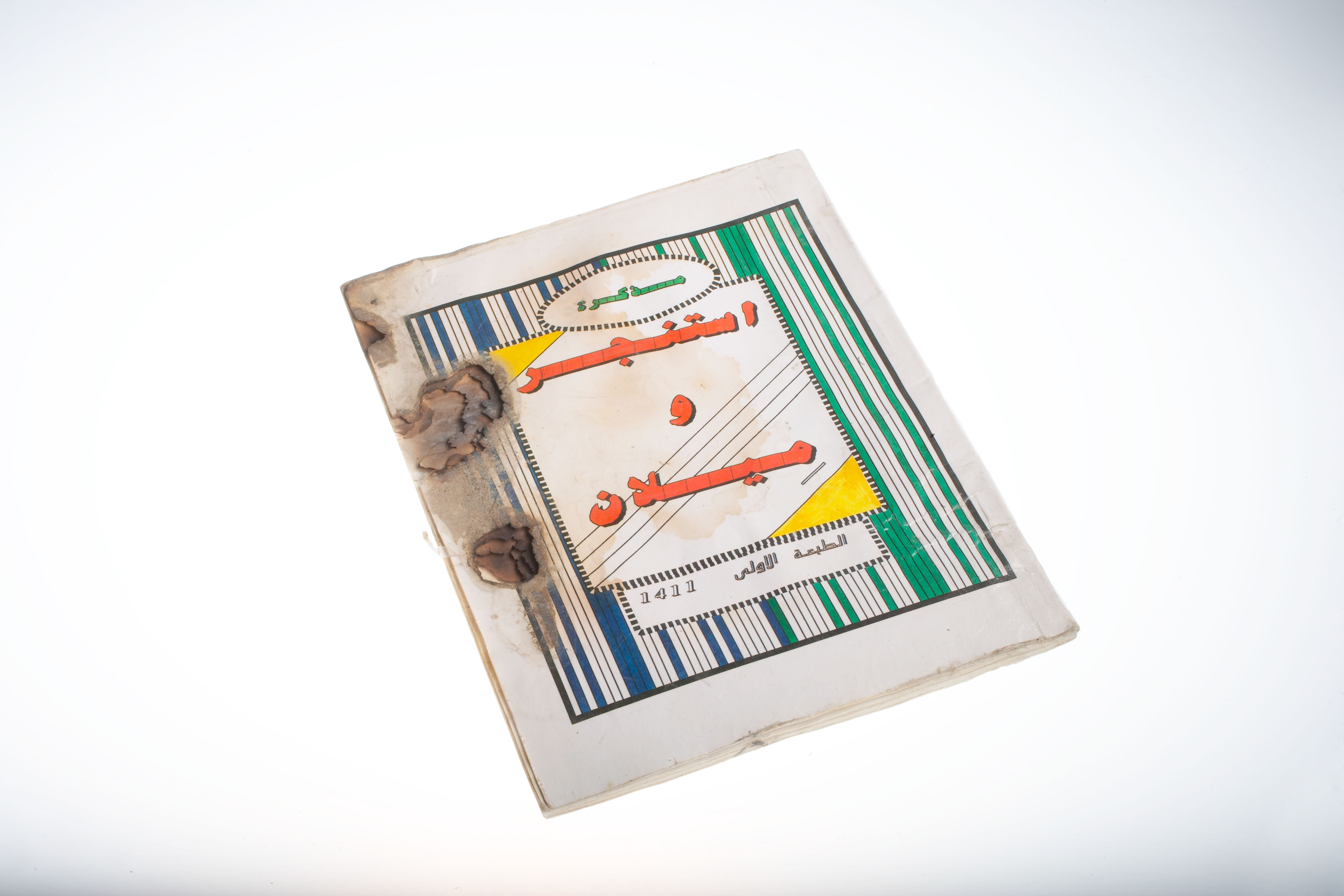
Al-Qa’ida Training Manual picked up near Kandahar, Afghanistan in 2001

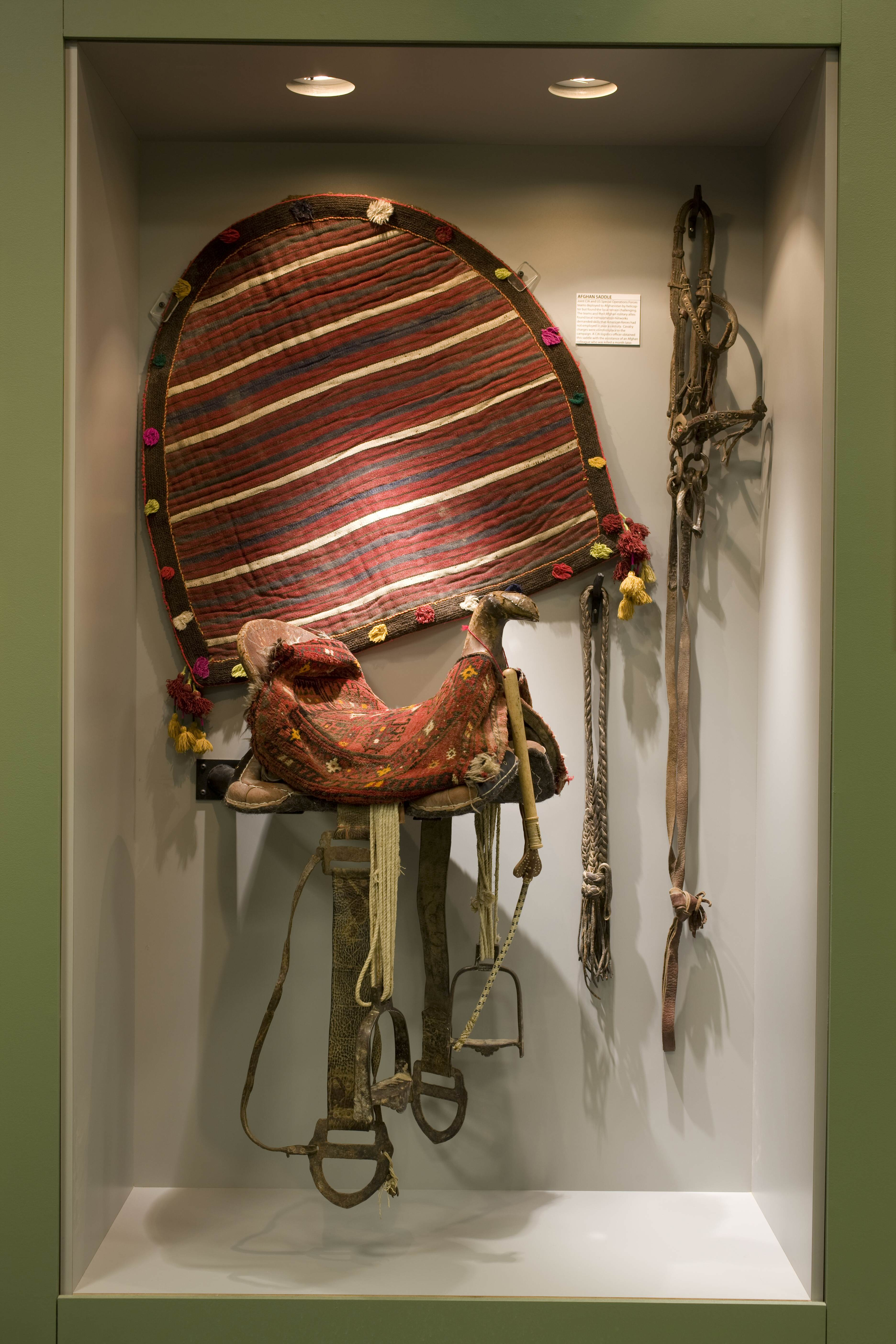
Afghan Saddle
