= Manuscript Society =

Manuscript Society may refer to:

- The Manuscript Society, an international organization that promotes the collection, preservation, and use of autographs, manuscripts, and historical documents
- Manuscript Society (Yale University), a senior society at Yale University in New Haven, Connecticut
- Manuscript Society of New York, a former organization in New York City devoted to performing new music by American composers
- Welsh Manuscripts Society, scholarly society in Wales
