= Janine De Greef =

Belgian resistance member (1925–2020)

- Born: September 25, 1925; Etterbeek, Belgium
- Died: November 7, 2020 (aged 95); Brussels

Janine Lambertine Marie Angele De Greef (born 25 September 1925, Etterbeek, Belgium – died 7 November 2020, Brussels) was a member of the Comet escape line in the Belgian and French Resistance during World War II. She lived with her family in southern France, occupied by Nazi Germany. As a teenager, together with her mother, Elvire; father, Fernand; and brother, Frederick, she helped Allied airmen shot down over Europe to escape from France to Spain. On more than 20 occasions, De Greef guided groups of airmen, most of whom did not speak French, from Paris to near the border with Spain by railroad. Her work was dangerous as the German occupiers attempted to capture airmen. If captured, their helpers were imprisoned and sometimes executed.

== Biography ==
In Belgium, De Greef's father was a businessman, while her mother, Elvire de Greef, worked for the newspaper L'Indépendance Belge. In May 1940, when the German army invaded and occupied Belgium, the De Greef family and an Englishman named Albert Edward Johnson fled in an attempt to transit Spain and take refuge in the United Kingdom or the United States. Finding the border with Spain closed, they moved into a farmhouse near Anglet, a town in the Basque Country of southwestern France about 25 kilometres (16 miles) from the border with Spain. Johnson, code named "B", formerly a chauffeur in Belgium, lived with the De Greefs, aiding them as a handyman.

By June 1941, hundreds of allied airmen who had been shot down over Europe and had evaded capture by the Germans were in Belgium. Belgians created the Comet Line to help the downed airmen escape from occupied Europe which involved travel from Belgium to southern France, usually by railroad, and hence across the Pyrenees by foot into Spain and safety. Few of the airmen spoke French and they needed documents, shelter, civilian clothing, food, and guides to successfully evade capture. Comet founder and leader, Andrée de Jongh, asked the de Greef family to guide airmen from Paris to their home in Anglet and arrange for them to make a clandestine crossing of the Pyrennes into Spain.

Janine's mother engaged in the black market as a cover for her activities with the Comet Line. Her father worked as an interpreter for the German occupiers and was able to get documentation for evacuees and soldiers. Her brother Frederick, an artist, forged official stamps. Johnson guided many evaders cross the Spanish border. Sixteen-year old Janine de Greef's first job with the Comet Line in October 1941 was picking up two airmen at a nearby railroad station and guiding them to a safe house near the border with Spain. In July 1942 Janine accompanied her mother to Paris to pick up several airmen. On the same trip the de Greefs also escorted Jewish pianist Stefan Askenase and his wife to safety. In September Janine visited Paris twice with de Jongh to accompany airmen to southern France. In October she made her first trip alone to Paris and returned to southern France with four airmen and Comet line guide Elvire Morelle. Overall, de Greef made more than twenty trips to Paris from 1942 to 1944 to escort downed airmen to southern France.

De Greef escorted her charges from Paris to Anglet by train, her youthfulness helping to evade suspicion. She would then take them to a safe house close to the Spanish border, the most dangerous part of the journey, handing them over to Basque guides. They used so many bicycles in this last route that their disposal became a big worry.

De Greef's diary was written in a mixture of shorthand, French and English.

By 1944, the northern escape route of the Comet Line had been disrupted by the Germans, and the southern part was in peril. The De Greef family used the route to reach San Sebastián in Spain, from where they were moved to England.

After the war, Janine De Greef was awarded the British King's Medal for Courage in the Cause of Freedom, the US Medal of Freedom, as well as French and Belgian gallantry medals. She was recognized as lieutenant of the Service de Renseignement et d'Action (Belgian Intelligence and Action Service). She returned to Brussels to work as a commercial attaché at the British Embassy. After her mother's death in 1991, she moved into her flat, which was later destroyed in a fire.

De Greef maintained an archive of war memorabilia as well as the family records of the Comet Line. These little black books were stolen from her.

Janine De Greef died on 7 November 2020.
