= Kattalin Aguirre =

French World War II resistance fighter

- Born: Catherine Lamothe; 28 August 1897; Sare, Pyrénées-Atlantiques, France
- Died: 22 July 1992 (aged 94); Ciboure, France
- Years active: 1936–1944
- Agent(s): Comet Line, Margot, Nana, Démocratie and Perroquet
- Known for: French Resistance
- Awards: Médaille militaire (France); Croix de Guerre (France); Legion of Honour (France)

Kattalin Aguirre, born as Catherine Lamothe (Sare, 28 August 1897 – Ciboure, 22 July 1992), was a Basque member of the French Resistance during the Second World War. She played a key role harbouring and assisting Allied soldiers (mostly airmen) and members of the resistance in their attempt to escape occupied France and Belgium. Besides of that she was a contact person between occupied France and neutral Spain. As a result of her involvement an estimated 1000 people could make their escape to Spain.

== Early life ==
Catherine Lamothe was born as the daughter of Martin Lamothe and Joséphine Légasse When she was 13 years old she started working at the Euskalduna Hotel in Ciboure, Southern France. Later on she would move to Paris to work as a maid. On 20 April 1927 she married Pierre Aguirre, whose surname she would take from that moment on. Only a few years later her husband died from the long-lasting consequences of a gas attack during the First World War. She moved to Ciboure to work at the Euskalduna Hotel again, which was run by her cousin Catherine Muruaga. Since 1936 she was helping Basque refugees who were fleeing the Spanish Civil War.

== Second World War ==
From the very beginning of the occupation Aguirre maintained close connections with smugglers and the nascent resistance, often regular visitors of the hotel. Amongst them were Florentino Goikoetxea and Alejandro Elizalde, who were invaluable for the escape lines. In 1942 she received the request to look after three "children" (the code word for fugitives). Later it would turn out that these were sent by Marguerite Corysande, countess of Grammont, who would found the Margot network. Aguirre accepted the request, and harboured the fugitives in her house.

Aguirre also worked for the Comet Line, headed by Elvire de Greef in southern France, sheltering fleeing airmen, nourishing them and bringing them safely to their mountain guide Florentino Goikoetxea. A pass through the Pyrenees allowed them to walk to Spain, which was neutral in the war, where they would be picked up by Michael Creswell, a diplomat with the British Embassy in Madrid. Creswell accompanied the airmen to Gibraltar where they were met by Donald Darling and repatriated to England.

In the beginning her tasks consisted mostly of sheltering pilots, soldiers or members of the resistance (among them Jean-François Nothomb, code name "Franco"). But soon she would play a more active role in the resistance. Marguerite Corysande put her in touch with Emile Meyran (code name "Milito"), an agent from Pau. He collected secret intel from occupied France to pass the information on to the Nana network, an organisation financed by the US intelligence agency OSS in Madrid. Aguirre carried the messages on a weekly basis to the coast, so she could hand them over to smugglers, who took the documents to Spain. Together with her 14-year-old daughter Joséphine ("Fifine") she carried out operations that involved smuggling money and forbidden radio equipment.

Her neighbour, Gracy Ladouce, worked at the municipal supply service of Ciboure, where she could collect food stamps for the fugitives

== Awards ==
- Médaille militaire (France)
- Croix de Guerre (France)
- Legion of Honour (France)

== Recognition ==
- There is a street named for her in Ciboure, l'Avenue Kattalin Aguirre.
- The walking route called le Chemin de la Liberté (the Way to Freedom) which runs through the Pyrenees is based on the escape lines of the Comet Line.
