= Antoine d'Ursel =

Member of the Belgian Resistance during WWII

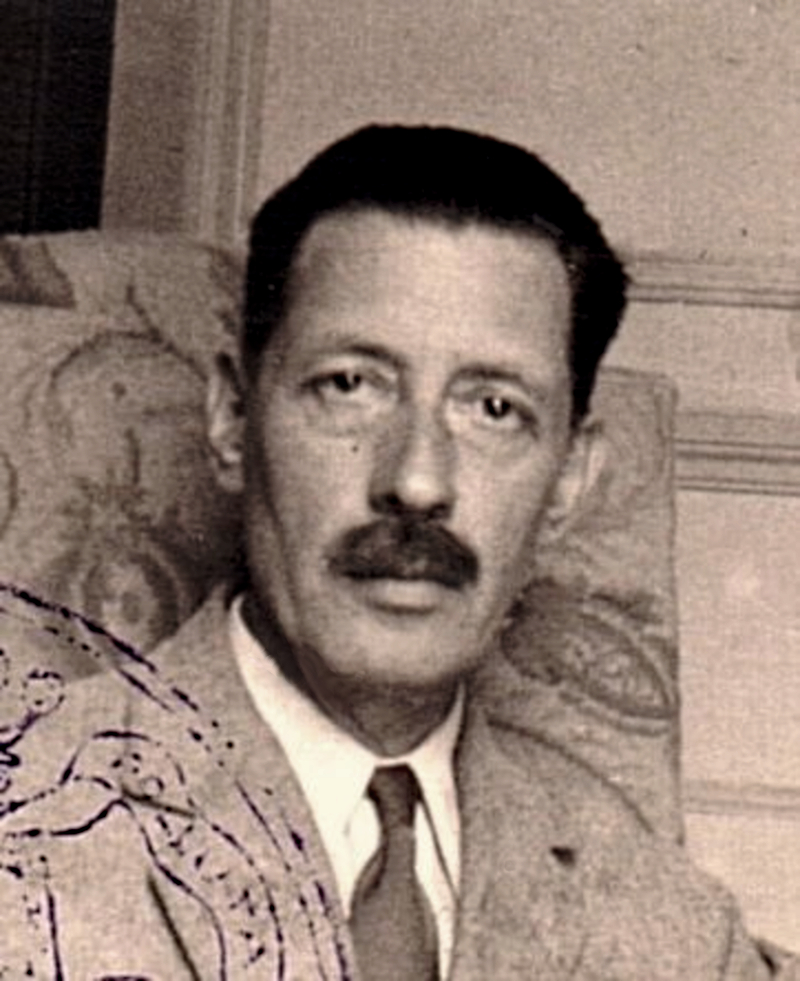

Count Antoine d'Ursel (1896–1943), code named Jacques Cartier, was a member of the Belgian Resistance during the Second World War. From February to June 1943, he led the Comet Line (Le Réseau Comète). The Comet Line, made up of thousands of civilian volunteers, helped Allied airmen shot down over Nazi-occupied Europe to evade capture and return to Britain via Spain. D'Ursel left the leadership of Comet and went into hiding to avoid being captured by the German occupiers of Belgium. In December 1943, d'Ursel drowned in the Bidasoa River on the border of Spain and France. He was attempting to cross the river to meet with British officials in Spain to gain support for a new escape line he planned to lead.

== Family and early life ==
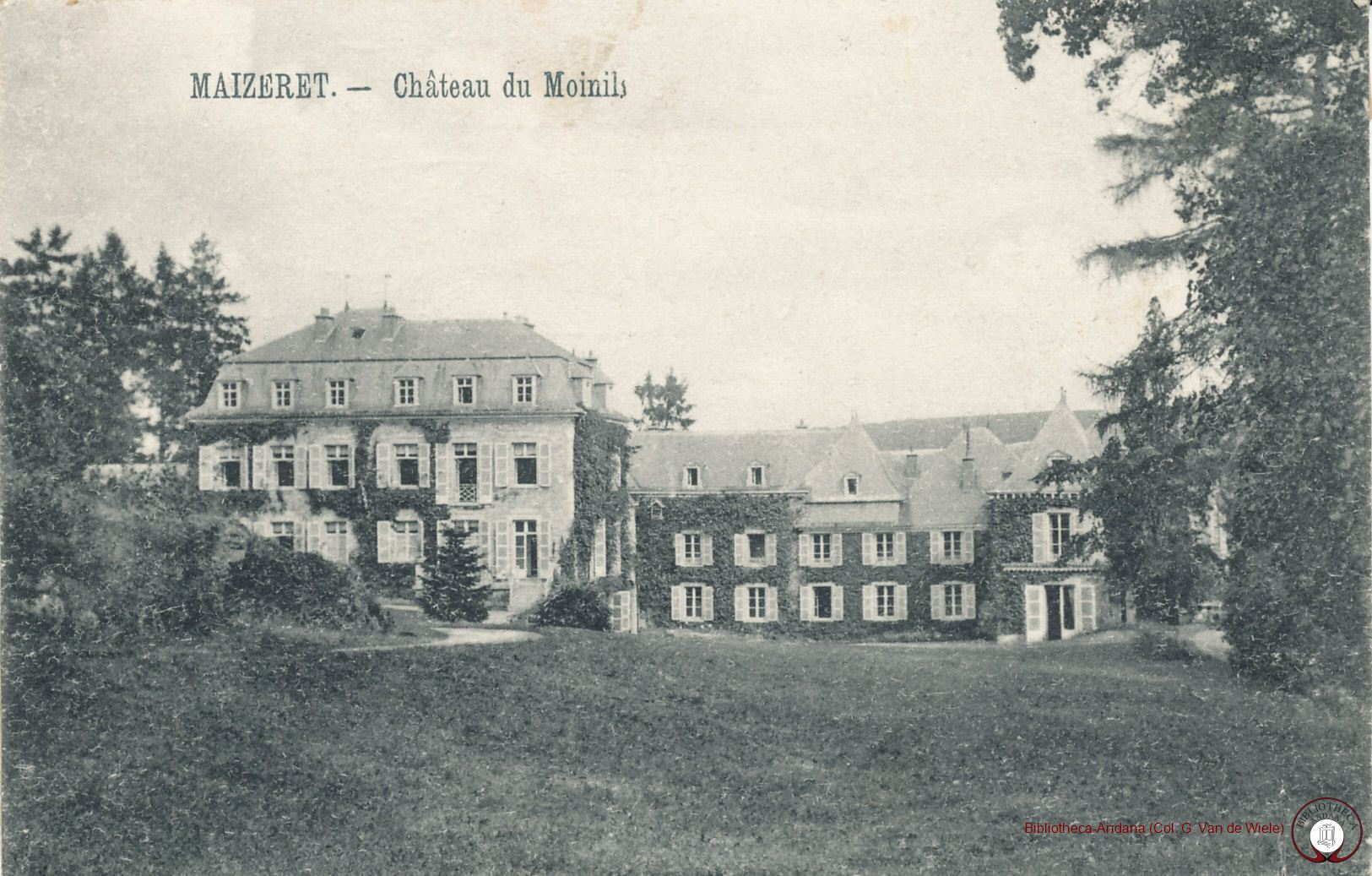
Château du Moisnil, d'Ursel and wife acquired the home in 1939

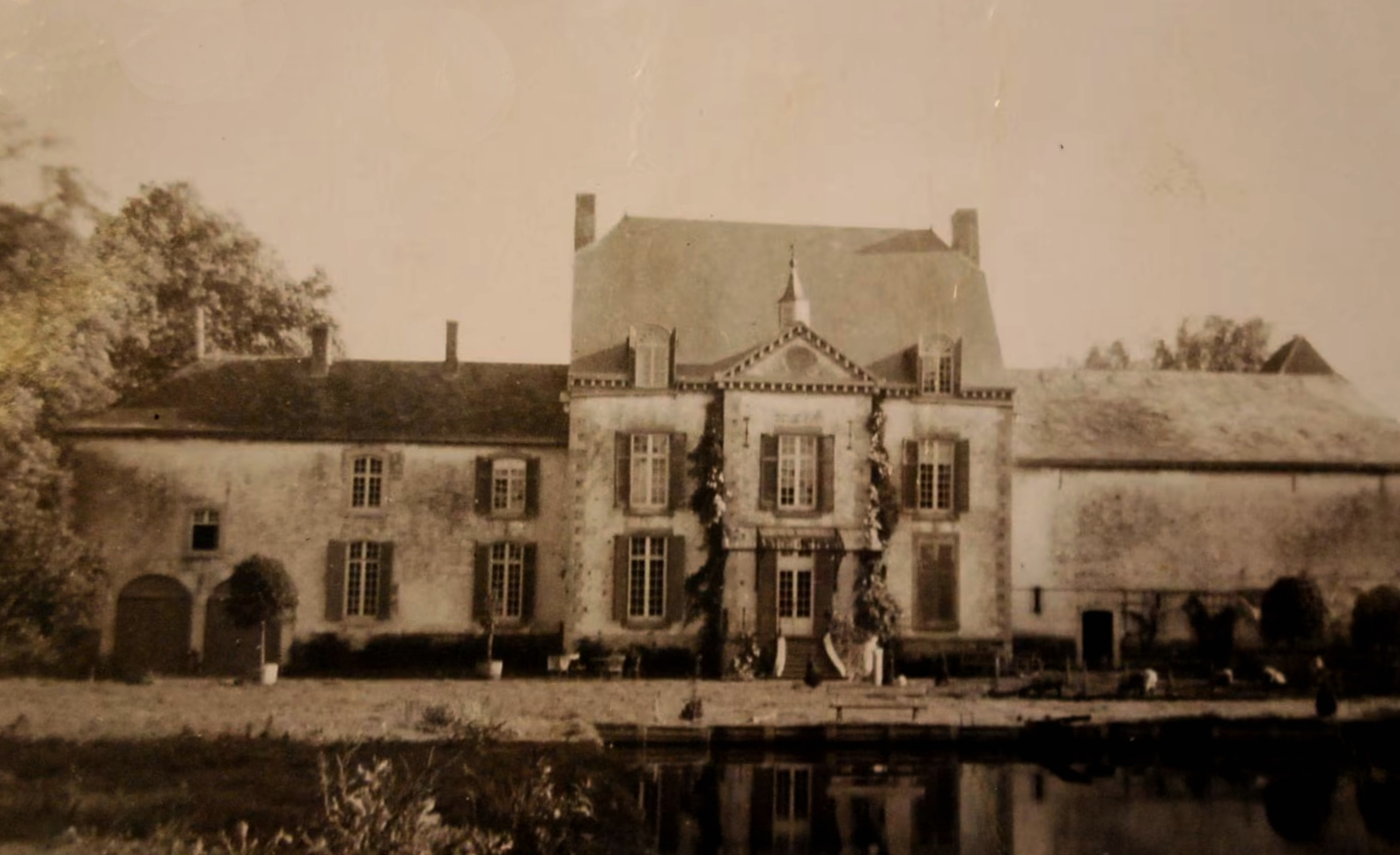
D'Ursel hid in this château fleeing capture by the Germans

Antoine d'Ursel was born into a prominent Belgian family on 23 January 1896 in Brussels. He has the youngest of eight children. He enlisted in the Belgian cavalry in August 1914 at the onset of World War I. He broke his pelvis in a fall from a horse in 1917. After the war ended he moved to Sumatra to work on a plantation. In 1920, he married Jeanne Thibault, a nurse who had cared for him while we was injured. She died in childbirth in 1924 while delivering their third child. In the 1920s he traveled in Indochina and in 1927 selected a site in Memot District, Cambodia to establish a 25,000 ha (62,000 acres) rubber plantation. In 1929, he remarried, this time to Margueritte de la Barre d'Erquelinnes. The couple had four children. In 1939, he acquired an estate near Namur, Belgium, although he continued to live mostly in Cambodia. He returned to Belgium in May 1940 when Nazi Germany invaded Belgium. His estate was bombed. His family had fled to Chamant, France where he found them on his return. In November 1940, the family returned to Namur.

Resistance to the German occupation of Belgium was a family affair. Six of d'Ursel's family members were arrested by the Germans including his wife and one of his daughters. His brother, Jacques d'Ursel, became an RAF bomber pilot and was killed during a raid on Duisburg, Germany on 6–7 August 1942. D'Ursel was described in 1943 as a "solid-looking fellow" with "deep pockets under his eyes and a baleful expression that reflected the loss of friends and family during three years of Nazi occupation...He carried himself like a military officer."

== Comet Line ==
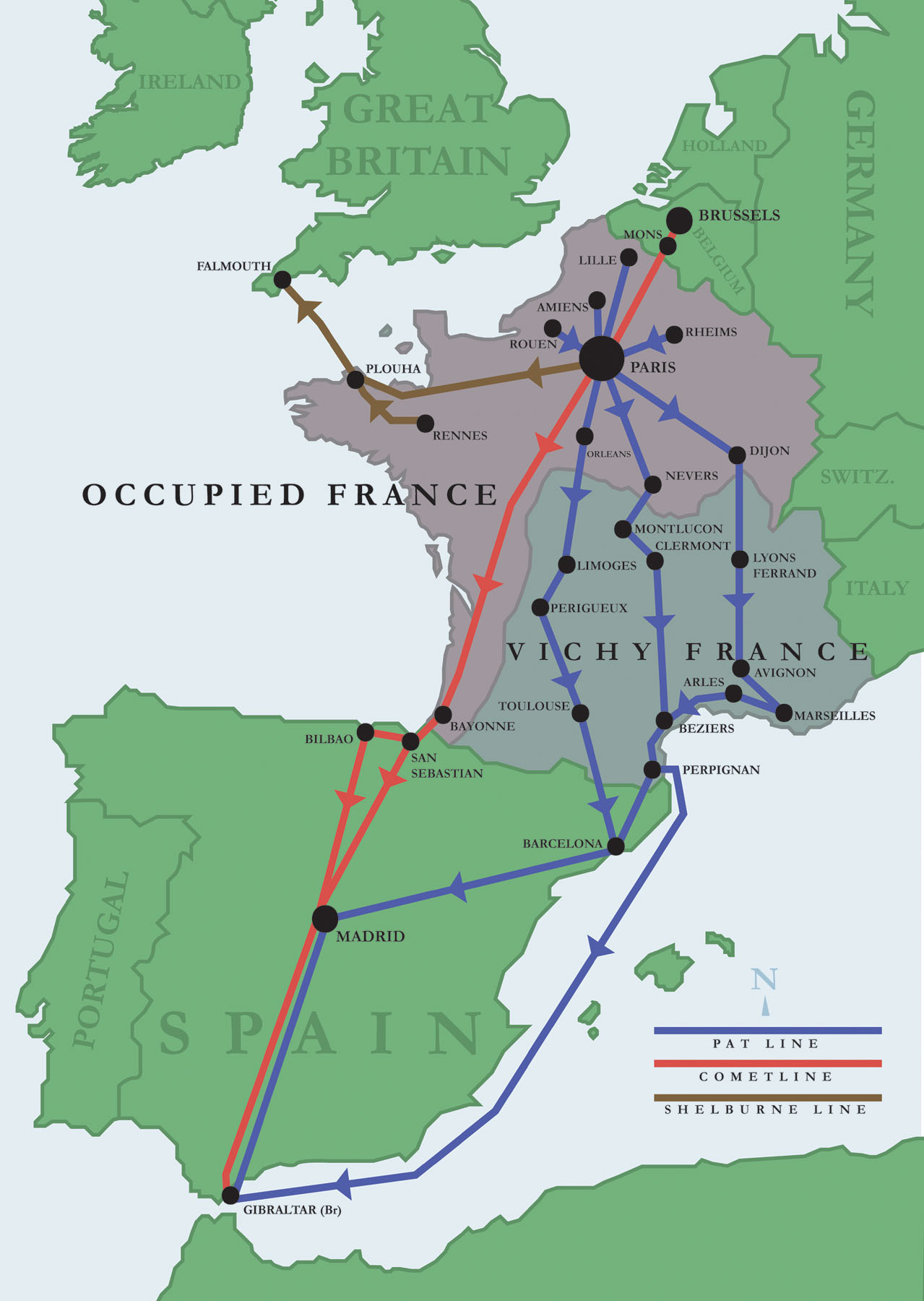
The routes used by escape lines to smuggle airmen out of occupied Europe.

During World War II, D'Ursel initially worked with the Clarence Intelligence Network which was supported by MI6, the British intelligence organization. In February 1943, he became the leader of the Comet Line in Belgium. The Comet Line helped Allied airmen shot down over occupied Belgium evade capture by Germans and return to Britain via Spain, a neutral non-combatant, to Great Britain. The Comet Line, composed of up to 3,000 civilian workers during World War II, had operational independence, but received financial assistance from MI9, the British government organization devoted to the escape of downed allied airmen. Most of the Comet Line workers were young, some even in their teens, contrary to d'Ursel who was forty-seven years old in 1943.

In early 1942, the Comet Line was decimated by arrests of its workers by the Germans, including founder Andrée de Jongh and her successor as leader, Jean Greindl. On assuming leadership in February, D'Ursel's job was to reconstitute the line in Belgium. He adopted the code name of "Jacques Cartier." Double agent Jacques Desoubrie (aka Jean Masson) resumed the German assault on the Comet Line in April 1943, again capturing many workers. In June d'Ursel, fearing capture, went into hiding in a chateau near Fallais. He turned over leadership of Comet in Belgium to Yvon Michiels. He created another escape line devoted to helping Comet Line members hunted by the Germans to escape to Spain and hence to Britain.

=== Death ===
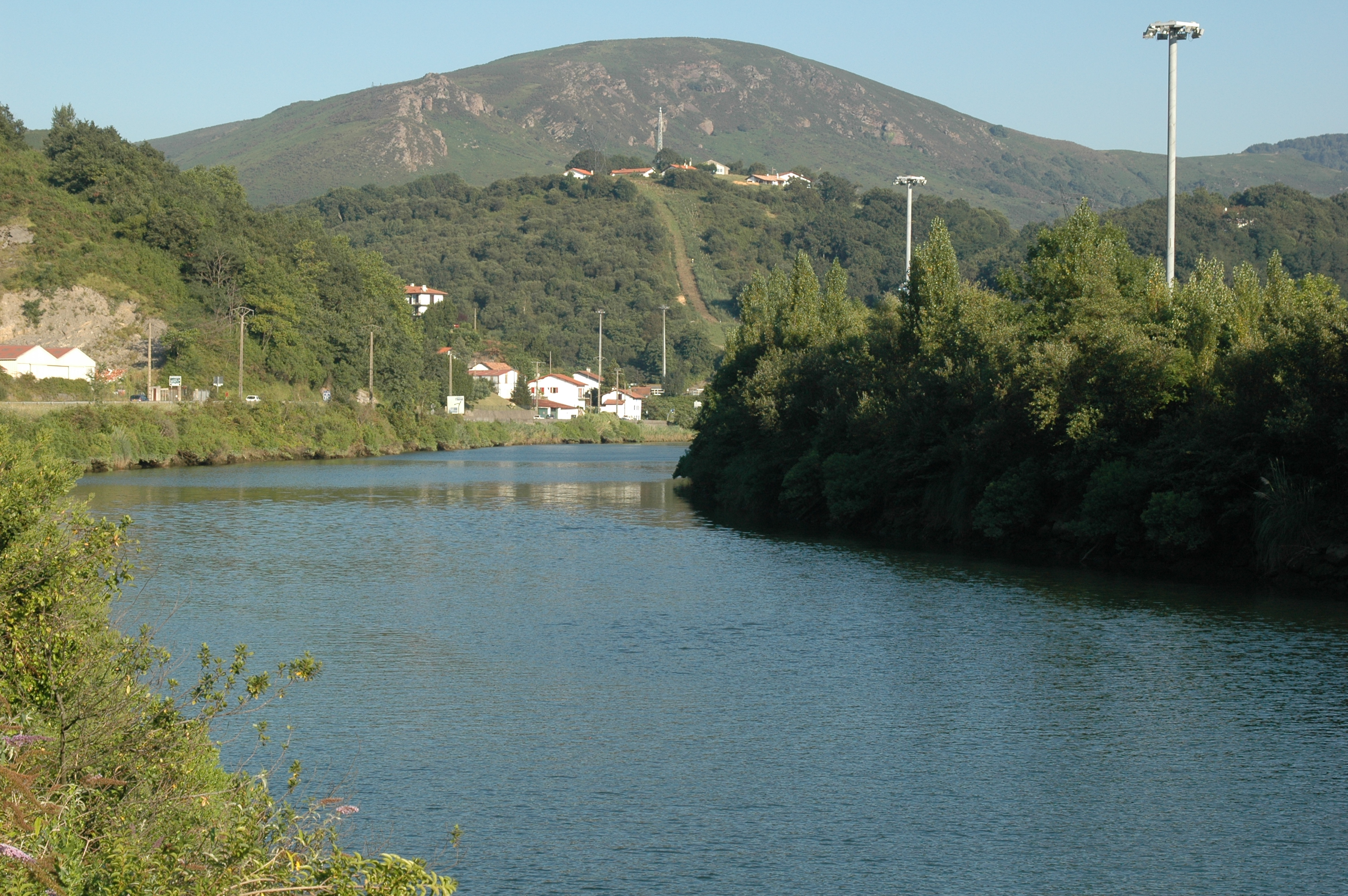
The Bidasoa River a few miles downstream from where d'Ursel drowned.

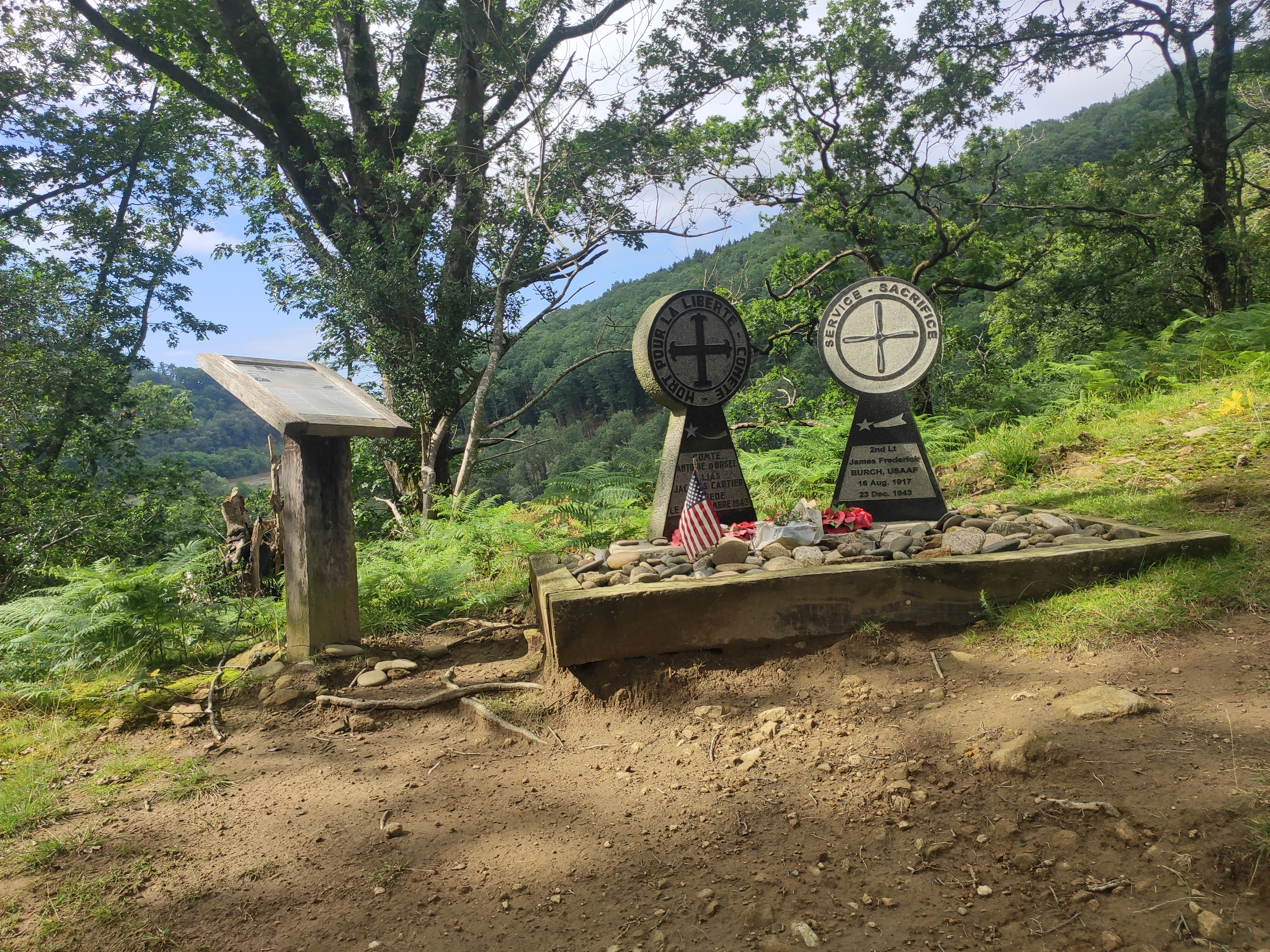
The monument to d'Ursel and Burch near the place of their deaths.

On 23 December 1943, four American airmen plus Comet Line leader in France Jean-François Nothomb and d'Ursel were in the home of Kattalin Aguirre in St. Jean de Luz, France near the border with Spain. A Frenchman named Richard and Comet Line operative, Albert Ancia, were also in Aguirre's house. D'Ursel planned to cross the border with the group and continue on to Gibraltar to discuss his new escape line with British authorities. Nothomb was there to accompany the airmen across the Pyrennes to Spain, a job he had done many times. Two Basque guides would lead them across the mountains although the Comet Line's favorite guide, Florentino Goikoetxea, was ill and would not be accompanying the group.

The Bidasoa River was the border between France and Spain. The border was patrolled by both French and Spanish police and German soldiers. The illegal crossing had to be done at clandestinely at night. The Bidasoa, usually wadeable, was swollen by rain. While crossing the river the men heard rifle shots. In the rush to get to cover, d'Ursel and airman J. F. Burch were swept away by the current and drowned. Nothomb, the two guides, and Richard escaped. The remaining three airmen and Ancia were captured on the Spanish side of the river, but were released a few days later at the behest of British Embassy officer Michael Creswell. They then returned safely to Britain. German soldiers recovered the bodies of d'Ursel and Burch downstream from the river crossing site. The Germans put the bodies on view in the town of Biriatou as a warning to the populace. They later took away the bodies and disposed of them at an unknown site. A few years later Andrée de Jongh and Nothomb placed a cross near the site of d'Ursel's drowning. In 2016, the "Friends of Comet" placed a stele honoring d'Ursel and Burch near the river crossing.
