= Andrée Dumon =

Belgian WWII resistance fighter (1922–2025)

- Born: Andrée Marie Dumon; 5 September 1922; Brussels, Belgium
- Died: 30 January 2025 (aged 102); Nivelles, Belgium
- Education: Royal Atheneum School
- Relatives: Micheline Dumon (sister)

Andrée Dumon (5 September 1922 – 30 January 2025), codenamed Nadine, was a Belgian Resistance fighter during World War II. She was captured and sent to Ravensbrück and Mauthausen concentration camps but survived.

Dumon was born in Belgium and raised in the Belgian Congo, where her father was a doctor. She returned to Belgium to train as a nurse. Aged 17 at the start of World War II, she joined the Comet Line escape network for Allied airmen and others, of which her father and sister were members. Her family was betrayed in August 1942 and her father was killed.

The Comet Line saved the lives of hundreds of airmen and soldiers. Dumon's service in the war resulted in her receiving an honorary Order of the British Empire and the US Medal of Freedom. Her memoirs were published in 2018.

== Early life ==
Andrée Marie Dumon, known as "Dédée", was born in the Uccle municipality of Brussels on 5 September 1922, the daughter of Eugene Dumon and Marie (née Plessix), a nurse. Dumon spent six years as a child in the Belgian Congo where her father was a doctor. The family returned to Belgium to enable her to train as a nurse. She was educated at the Royal Atheneum School in Uccle.

== Wartime activities ==
Dumon was aged 17 when Nazi Germany invaded Poland in 1939 and was outraged when Belgium capitulated in 1940. She joined the Resistance and became a member of the "Réseau Comète" (Comet Line), whose members guided shot-down Allied airmen, Belgian secret agents and others to a network of safe houses and helped them to escape to neutral countries. Her father was one of the leaders of the Luc-Marc intelligence network. Her sister Micheline Dumon, code-named Lily (died 2017), was in the Comet Line and after the war was awarded the George Medal for her work. Dumon was given the codename Nadine to avoid confusion with fellow resistance member Andrée de Jongh.

At first Dumon was responsible for finding food, clothing and shelter, and organising medical care and fake identity cards, but before long she was escorting Allied airmen through occupied Brussels to safe houses, under the noses of German soldiers. She recalled that being nervous was not an option. "I was very happy to do something. I had no time to be afraid." By 1941 she was accompanying British, Canadian, Australian and American airmen on nerve-wracking train journeys to Paris, from where they would escape through the Pyrenees to Spain.

The Germans knew that downed airmen were receiving help from the local population, and eventually tracked down and arrested more than 700 members of the Comet Line. More than 300 of them were killed. On 11 August 1942, the Dumon family were betrayed by a former member of the Comet Line and the Dumons were arrested and questioned, but Andrée maintained silence, even when beaten and threatened with execution. Her father was taken away and murdered in Gross-Rosen concentration camp. Dumon was held in the prisons of Trier, Cologne, Mesum, Zweibrucken and Essen, before being sent to Gross-Strehlitz concentration camp. She escaped from Gross-Strehlitz, but was betrayed by a farmer and recaptured. She was sent to Ravensbruck concentration camp in Germany and then to Mauthausen concentration camp in Austria, a four-day journey in bitter cold. When she arrived she collapsed in the snow, but was supported by other prisoners to prevent her being killed as an invalid. Dumon was freed from Mauthausen in April 1945, aged 22, suffering from typhus. It took her two years to recover and it had been expected that she would die.

== Later life ==
Dumon returned to Belgium on 1 May 1945. More than 800 airmen and 300 soldiers had been saved by the Comet Line, and after the war Dumon was contacted by many of those she had helped. In Belgium she was "decorated with the highest honours". In the UK she was awarded an honorary OBE. She was awarded the US Medal of Freedom for having "rendered extraordinary services to the cause of freedom [by] assisting directly in the recuperation and repatriation of about 100 Allied airmen". She maintained a strong relationship with the UK and represented Comète at all functions of the Royal Air Force's Escaping Society in London until it closed in 1995. She was Comète's representative in Belgium for the WW2 Escape Lines Memorial Society from 1987.

In her seventies Dumon began to lecture about her experiences in schools and elsewhere. She was a member of the board of directors of the Belgian Intelligence Studies Centre and a contributor to its publications, lectures, and exhibitions. In 1996, she and her sister opened an extension to the RAF Escaping Society's museum in East Kirkby, Lincolnshire. In the year 2000 she was still living in the house in Bruxelles where she had been arrested in 1942. In 2018 she published a memoir of the Comet Line and her experiences of the Nazi concentration camps, titled Je ne vous ai pas oubliés (I Have Not Forgotten You). In 2024 she appeared in a documentary, Comète, Women in the Resistance, screened by Flemish broadcast company VRT.

After the war, Dumon married Gustave Antoine. They had two children, and created a textiles company making what was described as "beautiful, refined clothing". Dumon died in Nivelles, Belgium, on 30 January 2025 at the age of 102.
