= Micheline Dumon =

Belgian World War II Resistance leader (1921-2017)

- Born: Micheline Aline Dumon; 20 May 1921; Brussels, Belgium
- Died: 16 November 2017 (aged 96); Saint-Siffret, France
- Relatives: Andrée Dumon (sister)

Micheline Aline Dumon (20 May 1921 – 16 November 2017), (code names Lily and Michou), was a member of the Belgian Resistance during World War II with the Comet Line (Réseau Comète). Her surname often appears misspelled as "Dumont" in historical sources. She was awarded the British George Medal and United States Medal of Freedom for helping allied airmen shot down over Belgium and France evade capture and imprisonment by Nazi Germany. As a member of the Comet Line, founded by Andrée de Jongh, she aided in the escape of more than 250 allied airmen. She guided downed airmen from Belgium and France to the border of neutral Spain from where they could be repatriated to Great Britain.

Dumon, despite her youth, was one of the Comet Line's most experienced and longest-serving members. In 1944, she unmasked a German infiltrator, Jacques Desoubrie, who had been responsible for the arrests of many Comet Line members. She became known to the Gestapo and fled to England, where she remained until the end of the war.

== The Comet Line ==
Dumon was in nursing school in August 1942 when her father Eugene, mother Marie (code name "Francoise"), and younger sister Andrée (code name "Nadine") were arrested by German security forces and imprisoned. "Nadine" was an important member of the Comet Line, being the principal courier between Brussels and Paris. Her father would die in prison; her mother was released in 1943; and her sister survived the war in Mauthausen and Ravensbrück concentration camps.

I knew a lot of people and moved around a lot. I never stayed in one place, and so I was always alone. Also I was lucky.

— Micheline Dumon, telling how she avoided capture by the Germans.

"Lily" Dumon took over for her family members in the Comet Line, helping Allied airmen shot down over Belgium elude capture and escape Nazi-occupied Europe to neutral Spain from where they could be evacuated to Great Britain. Initially, she was in charge of safe houses where downed airmen were kept, nursed wounded airmen, helped prepare false identification cards, and connected airmen with escorts who would accompany them from Brussels to Spain, a roundabout distance of 1,500 kilometres (930 miles) via train, bicycle, and foot. After nearly being captured by the Germans, she went underground, living in safe houses and with other members of the Comet Line. She had a false identification card which said she was 16 years old and a student. Being "pert" and "tiny" she appeared that age. According to one airman, she looked to be 12 or 13 years old. She emphasized her youth by dressing like a teenager, young students not being as suspicious to the Germans as older women. She spoke some English which made her suitable for interacting with Allied airman who only rarely spoke French.

Unlike most Comet Line escorts who tried to be inconspicuous, Dumon was sometimes dramatic. "Fifty times or more [she] outwitted the German agents by suddenly enacting a tender, tearful love scene in a streetcar or on a station platform with some airmen she had only known for an hour or two. Encountering such a scene, the embarrassed German agent would pass on and ask no questions."

With the near collapse of the Comet Line in June 1943 due to arrests by the Germans, Dumon assumed more of a leadership position. "She became a sort of odd-job woman: looking for hide-outs, escorting pilots, recruiting new agents, collecting food coupons, restore[ing] the escape route after each wave of arrests. She had a thorough knowledge of the whole line. If due to arrests or other circumstances there was a shortage of agents she joined in." In January 1944, with the situation becoming too dangerous for her in Brussels, she moved to Paris, then quickly to Bayonne in southwestern France, where Elvire de Greef was the leader of the Comet Line. She escorted two groups of 10 airmen across the Pyrenees to Spain. In March 1944, she was one of three Comet Line leaders meeting in Madrid with British authorities to plan for Comet Line action before and during the upcoming invasion of France by Allied forces. She went back to Paris from there and was arrested by the French police and spent two nights in jail, but she was not given to the Gestapo. She turned on her "babyish act" and the police commandant released her because she was so "young."

== Rooting out a double agent ==
Her name became a legend amongst the countless airmen who had been shepherded across Brussels by the famous Lily...[She] pursued those ideals of patriotism and duty with unflinching determination, fearing nothing and ready to sacrifice all, with the result that through her gallantry and devotion countless airmen were able to escape from the enemy.

Many of the arrests of Comet Line helpers in 1943 and 1944 had been orchestrated by a Belgian man named Jacques Desoubrie. Under the name Jean Masson he had become useful to the Comet Line in 1943 but had betrayed its leadership to the Germans, nearly destroying the organization. At a Comet Line meeting in February 1944 in Paris, Dumon met a familiar looking man who said his name was Pierre Boulain. He was wearing a polka dot necktie, and she recalled an admonition of her father, "If you see someone wearing something garish it could be a signal, so pay attention." She didn't follow up on her suspicions immediately, but in March in Paris, during her brief incarceration, she had an opportunity to ask a Comet Line helper in prison the identity of her betrayer. The answer was Pierre Boulain, and she realized that Boulain was the same man who had betrayed the Comet line one year earlier under the name Jean Masson. She passed this information along to Jean de Blommaert and Albert Ancia, MI9 agents in France implementing Operation Marathon. They were incredulous. They had been favorably impressed by Boulain and were planning to give him 500,000 francs to establish a safe-haven camp for airmen in Belgium. They wanted more proof that he was a German agent.

When the two MI9 agents met with Boulain/Desoubrie on 7 May, Dumon observed the meeting from a distance and then followed Boulain. He detected her following him and realized that he was under suspicion as a German agent. He moved toward her and she ran, finding her way into a metro station and watching as he searched the station for her. As Boulain knew her identity, she realized the Gestapo would also soon know. She left for southwestern France the next day and Elvire de Greef arranged a quick exit over the border to Spain. From Spain the British flew her to England.

In 1945, after the war had ended, an American intelligence officer called Dumon to his office to look at several photographs. Dumon identified the man in the photos as Pierre Boulain/Jean Masson/Jacques Desoubrie. The intelligence officer told her that Desoubrie was working for the Americans at Nuremberg. Desoubrie was subsequently captured and executed in 1949.

== Later life ==
Dumon arrived in England on 22 June 1944. She began training with MI9 for returning to Belgium as an undercover operative, but Belgium was liberated before she was to be parachuted into the country.

In England, she met her future husband Pierre Ugeux, a paratrooper and French Major in the Special Operations Executive (SOE). Ugeux, as an SOE employee, was familiar with her work in the Resistance. They married in 1945 and after the war moved to France. The couple had four children: Nicole, Brigitte, Guy, and Stefan. He was later highly active in motorsports. Ugeux died in 2009 Dumon died in 2017.

== Honors ==
- Awarded the British George Medal on 6 January 1967
- Awarded the U.S. Medal of Freedom with Gold Palm
