= Elvire De Greef =

Belgian World War II Resistance leader (1897-1991)

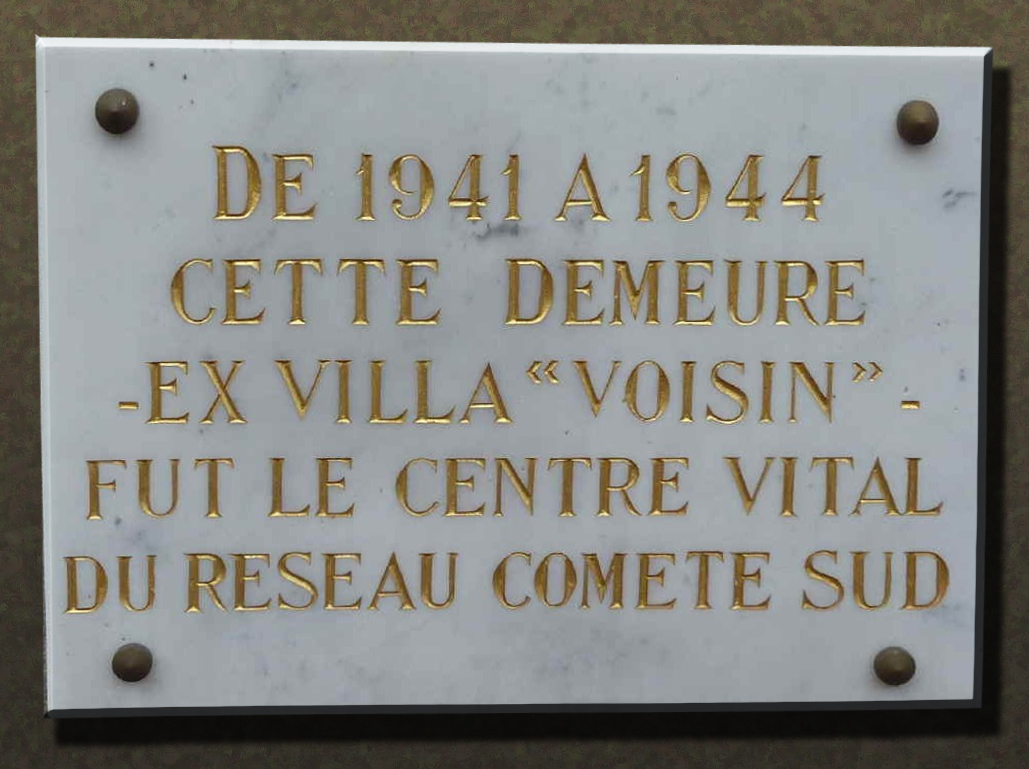
- Commemorative plaque on Villa Voisin, her former house in Anglet.
- Born: Elvire Ghislaine Berlemont; 29 June 1897; Ixelles, Belgium
- Died: 20 August 1991 (aged 94); Brussels, Belgium

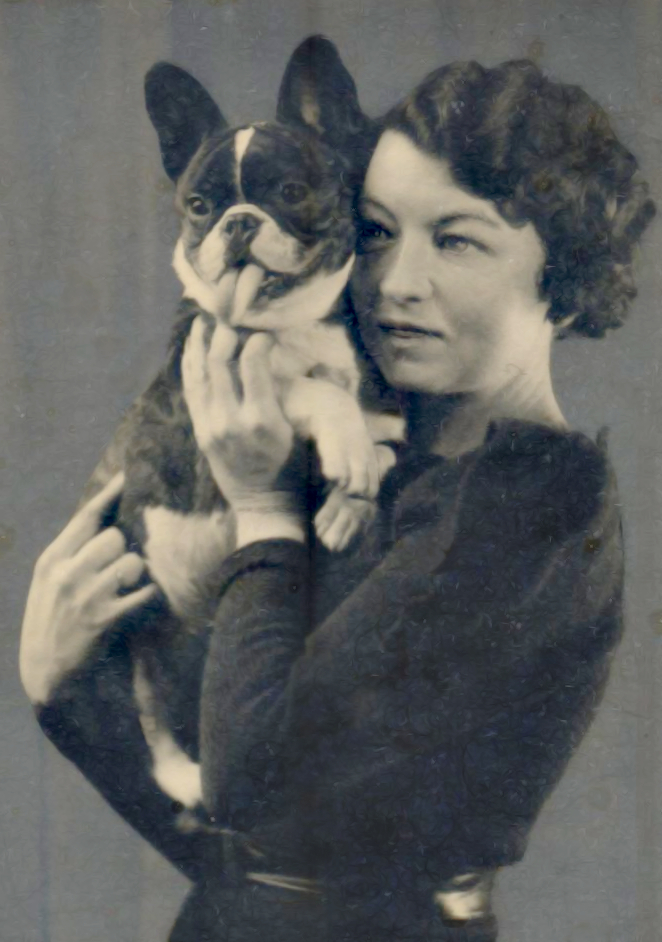
Elvire de Greef and her Dog "Go" about 1940.

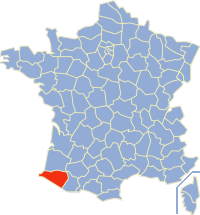
The area in which de Greef operated.

Elvire De Greef, (29 June 1897 – 20 August 1991), code name Tante Go or Auntie Go, was a Belgian World War II Resistance leader who was a member of the Comet Escape Line in World War II. From her house in Anglet in southwestern France, near the border with Spain, she led efforts by the Comet Line in the Basque country to exfiltrate people from occupied Belgium through France to Spain, especially Allied airmen whose aircraft had been shot down by Nazi Germany. Once across the border in neutral Spain the escapees were transported to the United Kingdom. De Greef's husband and two teenage children also worked with the Comet line.

De Greef was a recipient of the George Medal from the United Kingdom and the Medal of Freedom from the United States. Unlike many of the leaders of the Comet Line, De Greef was never captured by the Germans. Authors Nichol and Rennell regarded De Greef as the most important person of the Comet Line, except for founder Andrée de Jongh.

== Background ==
Born Elvire Ghislaine Berlemont, she married Fernand De Greef (born 11 November 1902) in 1922. The couple had two children: Frederick, born in 1923, and Janine (born 29 September 1925). In May 1940, when the German army invaded and occupied Belgium, the De Greef family and an Englishman named Albert Edward Johnson fled in an attempt to transit Spain and take refuge in the United Kingdom. Finding the border with Spain closed, they moved into a vacant house in Anglet, a town in the Basque Country of southwestern France about 25 kilometres (16 miles) from the border with Spain. Johnson, code named "B", formerly a chauffeur in Belgium, lived with the De Greefs, aiding them as a handyman. Johnson and the De Greef children would later serve as couriers and guides for airmen attempting to escape to Spain. Their house, the "Villa Voisin", was less than 1 kilometre (0.62 miles) from the house where the German military commander lived.

When the Germans occupied the area in June 1940, Fernand got a job with the city government. As a translator and interpreter for the French with the German army, he had the opportunity to gather intelligence and steal and falsify documents, stamps, and identification cards and was assisted by his son, Frederick. Elvire became involved in the black market and smuggling, a time-honored occupation of people on the Franco-Spanish border. The German occupiers were among her customers, relationships which she would rely on later. Her well-known black marketing activities gave her an excuse to be seen at odd times and odd places. Before leaving Brussels, Elvire had let it be known to a banker named Appert (or Apper) that she wanted to be involved in the resistance to the Germans. They agreed that a person sent by Appert to seek help from the De Greef's would present him or herself with the password of "Is Go dead?" Gogo was the name of a deceased pet dog of the De Greef's.

== The Comet Line ==
In 1941, Andrée de Jongh was a 24-year-old Belgian woman who, along with a 32-year-old Belgian man, Arnold Deppé, was attempting to set up what became known as the Comet Line ("Reseau Comete"). In June, Deppé journeyed from Belgium to southwestern France where he had once lived to look for the means to smuggle allied soldiers, downed airmen, and other people vulnerable to capture by the Germans out of Belgium. On Appert's advice, Deppé made contact with the De Greef family and arranged for their help in getting people across the border. Later, on first meeting Elvire, de Jongh jokingly called her "aunt" and thus Elvire combined aunt with the name of her deceased dog and became "Tante Go" ("Auntie Go"). Her husband Fernand's code name was "Uncle."

Andrée de Jongh and Arnold Deppé, assisted by the De Greefs, attempted their first crossing of the Spanish border in July 1941 with 10 Belgians and "Miss Richards", supposedly an English woman but actually a Belgian secret agent named Frederique Dupuich. After they successfully crossed the border, de Jongh and Deppé left their charges to fend for themselves, and returned to Belgium. The 10 Belgians and "Miss Richards" were arrested by Spanish police. Three Belgian soldiers among them were turned over to the Germans in France. The others were jailed briefly and fined. From this experience, de Jongh realized that in future exfiltrations they must accompany their charges secretly all the way to the British Consulate in Bilbao.

In August, Deppé and de Jongh escorted another group of people, de Jongh taking a longer, more rural, and safer route with three men, including a British soldier, and Deppé a shorter, more dangerous route with six men. An informer betrayed Deppé and his party and they were arrested by the Germans. Deppé was imprisoned for the remainder of the war. De Jongh arrived safely at the De Greef house in Anglet and crossed into Spain with a Basque smuggler, Thomas Anabitarte, as a guide. Anabitarte had been hired by Elvire for his knowledge of the mountainous border region. De Jongh and her charges arrived safely at the British Consulate in Bilbao. She persuaded the British government to pay the Comet Line's expenses for transporting allied soldiers and airmen from Belgium to Spain, but declined all other assistance and guidance offered by the British.

== Leader of the southern Comet Line ==
Elvire De Greef was the leader of the southern section of the Comet Line. Her helpers included the three members of her family, about a dozen other key people who lived in neighboring cities and towns plus a number of sympathizers, and several Basque guides who were paid for leading escapees over the mountains into Spain. She also had helpers inside Spain who received the escapees and assisted their onward journey to San Sebastián and Bilbao. In three years of activity de Greef aided 101 exfiltration missions which successfully exfiltrated 288 airmen, mainly British and American, and 84 other persons, mostly Belgians, needing to escape occupied Europe. The allies put a high priority on recovering airmen shot down in Europe and returning them to service as it was time-consuming and expensive to train replacement aircrew. De Greef also supervised the finances of the southern section, accounting for the expenditure of 17 million French Francs (equivalent to 5 million in 2017 U.S. dollars). Most of the money came from the United Kingdom.

One of De Greefs most important helpers was a Basque widow, Kattalin Aguirre, who along with her 14-year-old daughter, Josephine ("Fifine"), provided a safe house for airmen after they got off the train in Saint-Jean-de-Luz and set them on their way toward the nearby border. The Euskalduna Hotel where Aguirre worked was a meeting place for smugglers and Comet Line helpers. Elvire De Greef's daughter, Janine (often spelled Jeanine), was the youngest guide of the Comet Line, first accompanying aviators by train from Paris to Bayonne when she was only 16.

== Crossing the border ==
The final stretch of the Comet Line escape route crosses the French/Spanish border at the Bidasoa river near Endarlatsa...It is an intricate crossing winding along hidden stream valleys and mountain shoulders; through tunnels and past isolated mountain farms...they crossed at night, in the fear of being shot either by the Nazis on the French side or Franco's henchmen on the Spanish side.

— "The World War II Comet Line"

Elvire De Greef "was involved in numerous black market operations...and by these activities lulled suspicion of her real work....on more than one occasion she blackmailed Germans by threatening to reveal their possession of black market goods and thus escaped arrest."

— Airey Neave, MI9

The usual practice of the Comet Line was for airmen and other evacuees to travel by train from Brussels or Paris with an escort, often Andrée de Jongh, to either Bayonne or Saint-Jean-de-Luz. Both cities were near the De Greef's home and the border with Spain. The airmen and their escort were met and conducted to a safe house where they would await favorable conditions for the walk to Spain over the Pyrenees mountains which reached elevations of only about 700 metres (2,300 ft) in this region. During the first year of operation, the De Greef's home usually hosted the evacuees, but later a network of safe houses was established. From the safe houses, the evacuees were escorted to country homes and inns near Urrugne, usually traveling by bicycle. From Urrugne it was a one to three night hike of about 25 kilometres (16 mi) with a Basque guide, usually one who had been a smuggler and knew the mountains intimately, across the Franco-Spanish border to Oiartzun, near San Sebastián. There, the evacuees were met by a driver and automobile belonging to British diplomats which took them to Madrid. From Madrid, the evacuees were escorted by British diplomats to Gibraltar from where they would be flown to the United Kingdom.

The most dangerous part of the walk across the mountains was the crossing of the Bidassoa river near Endarlatsa. The Bidassoa River was the border of France and Spain. Border guards were on both sides of the river and high water often made the crossing of the river difficult or impossible. In December 1943, Comet Line leader Antoine d'Ursel and American pilot James F. Burch were drowned while attempting to cross the river.

Elvire crossed the border four times to convey intelligence about the Germans to the British in Bilbao. Her daughter Janine, only 16 years old, made four visits to Paris in 1942 to assist Andrée de Jongh in escorting evacuees from Paris by train to the border of Spain. The De Greef's handyman, Albert Johnson, "B", escorted 13 groups of escapees across the border into Spain from 1942 to 1944. Andrée de Jongh accompanied evacuees across the border 32 times according to one calculation. Jean-François Nothomb guided many evaders from Paris to Spain from October 1942 to January 1944. Several Basque guides worked with the Comet Line, the most competent being Florentino Goikoetxea, a smuggler and a fugitive from Franco's Fascist government, who could find his way across the Pyrenees at night without difficulty.

== The end of the Comet Line ==
As the demand for expatriation of flyers increased in 1943, the Comet Line added additional routes to Spain in addition to the one supervised by Elvire De Greef. On 6 June 1944 with the German Gestapo closing in on the De Greefs and their organization, Elvire and her son and daughter crossed the border into Spain. The children were evacuated to England. Elvire returned to France shortly.

Elvire and her husband Fernand participated in a rescue mission. Although movement of airmen across the Franco-Spanish border had mostly ceased with the D-Day invasion of France on 6 June 1944, the Basque guide Florentino Goikoetxea continued to cross the border to deliver messages to British authorities in San Sebastián, Spain. Returning from a mission on 26 July, he was shot four times by German border guards although he managed to hide the documents he was carrying. He was taken to a hospital in Bayonne. The local resistance forces and the De Greefs decided to rescue him. On 27 July, Elvire visited him the hospital and told him a rescue would be attempted. Later that day two German-speaking Bayonne policemen working with the resistance showed up at the hospital in an ambulance driven by Fernand. They pretended to be Gestapo agents, and demanded to take Florentino (as he was universally known) with them. They put him in the ambulance and drove away. Florentino remained in hiding until the Nazis abandoned southwestern France a month later.

The De Greef family returned to Belgium after the country was liberated from the Nazis.
