= Untxin =

Location
- Country: France

Physical characteristics
- Source
  - location: Xoldokogaina
  - coordinates: 43°19′40″N 1°42′57″W
- Mouth
  - location: Bay of Biscay
  - coordinates: 43°23′29″N 1°41′1″W
- Length: 9.5 km (6 mi)

The Untxin is a coastal river of the French Basque Country, in Nouvelle-Aquitaine, Southwest France. It is 9.5 km (5.9 mi) long.

It rises on the northern slope of the Xoldokogaina, elevation 479 metres (1,572 ft), in the east of Biriatou. The motorway of the Basque Coast (A63) is settled in its valley. It collects in Urrugne waters from the Mandale. The Untxin flows into the ocean in Ciboure.

== Main tributaries ==
- Arrolako Erreka

== Départements and towns ==
- Pyrénées Atlantiques: Urrugne, Ciboure.
