= Jean-François Nothomb =

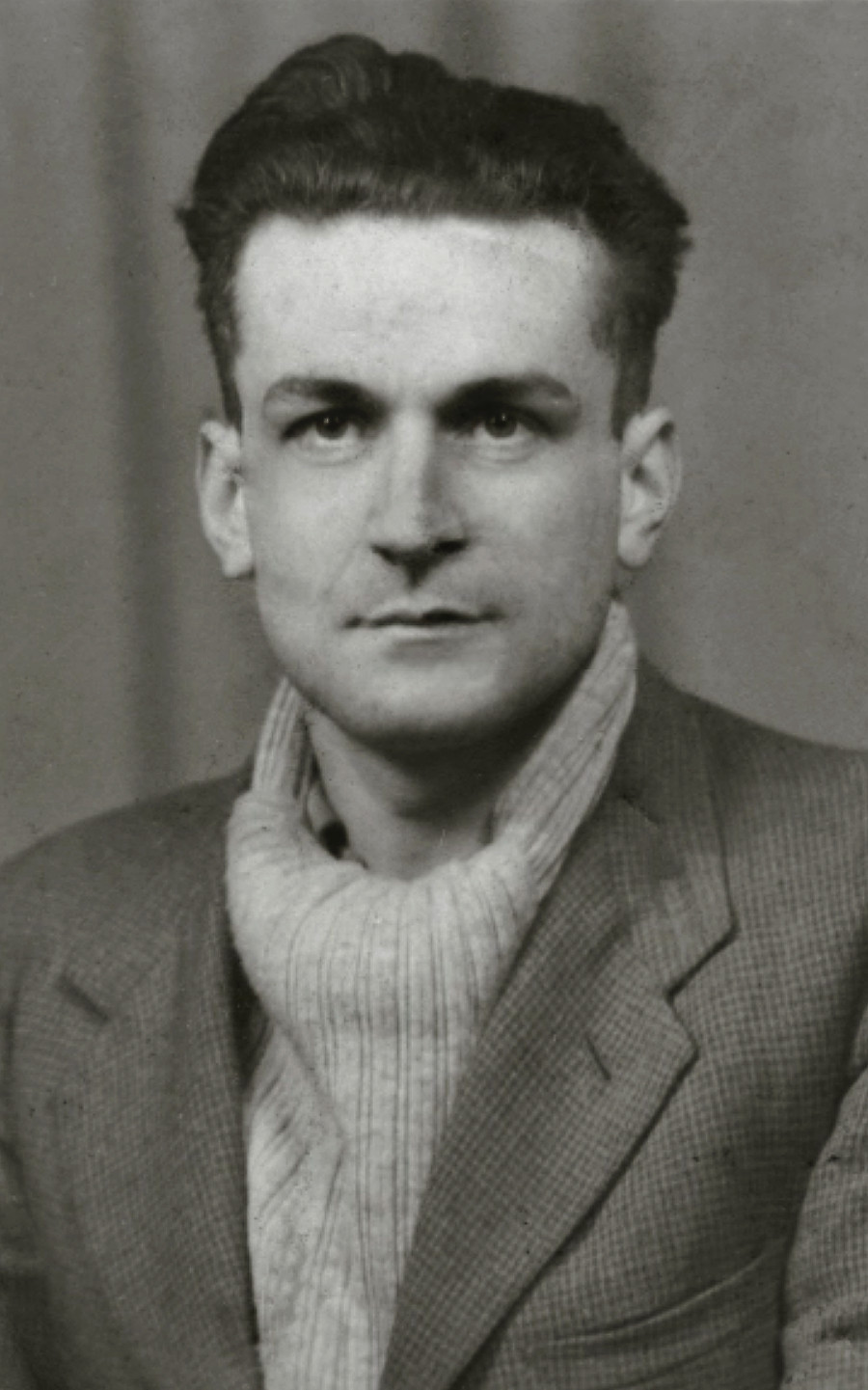
Jean-François Nothomb in 1943.

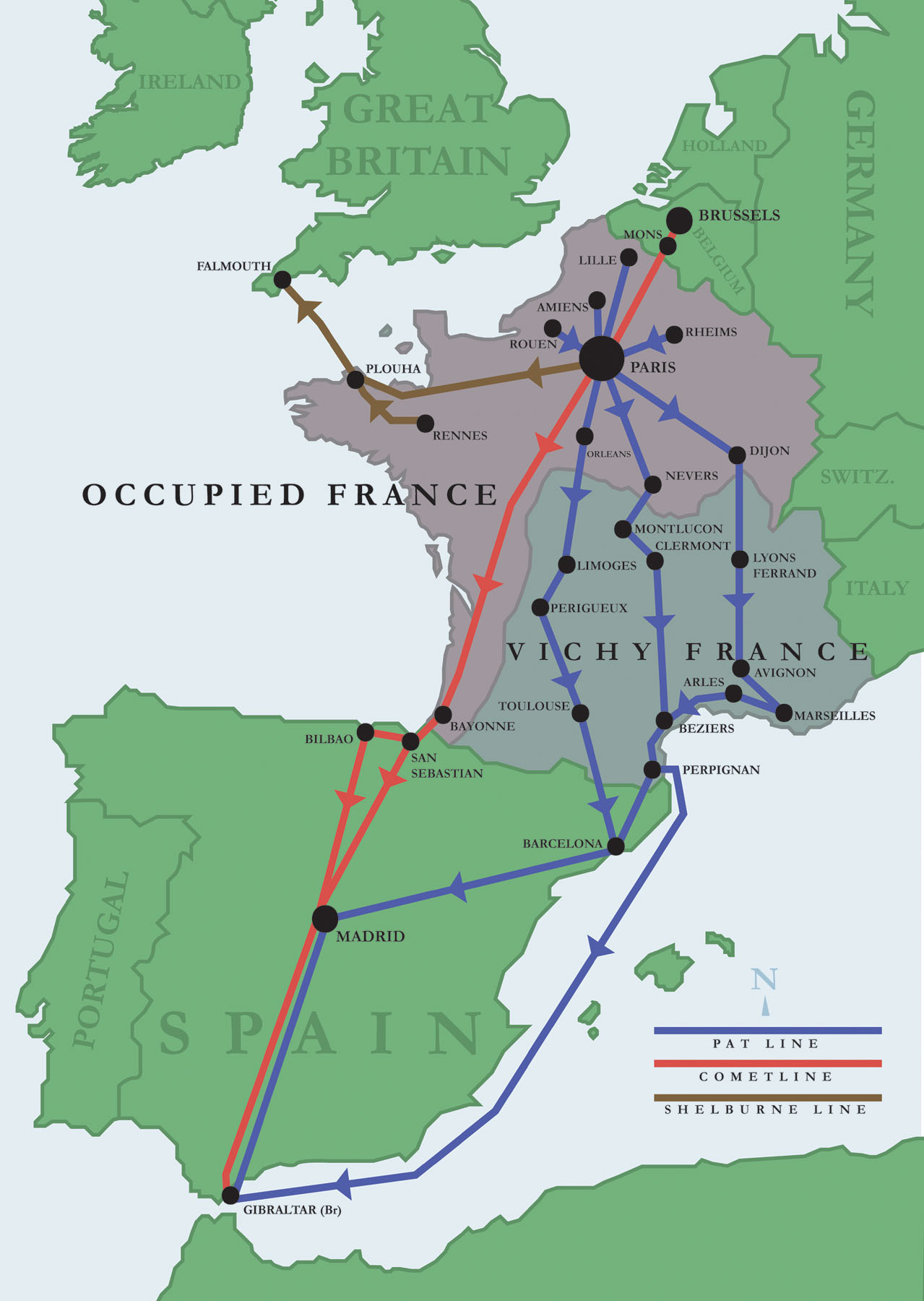
The routes used by the Pat, Comet, and Shelburne escape lines to smuggle airmen out of occupied Europe.

Jean-François Marie Victoire Northomb (born 5 January 1919, Hasselt, Belgium, died 6 June 2008, Rome, Italy), code named Franco, was a member of the clandestine Comet Line during World War II. Founded in Belgium, the Comet Line helped people, especially Allied airmen shot down over Nazi-occupied Europe, evade capture by the Germans and escape to Great Britain. Northomb joined the Comet Line in August 1942 and led the Line from June 1943 to January 1944. He is credited with helping guide 215 persons, mostly escaping and evading airmen, on the hazardous journey from Paris to Spain. He led airmen on foot across the Pyrenees many times, eluding Spanish and German border patrols. He was captured in Paris by the Germans in January 1944 and sentenced to death but instead imprisoned for the duration of the war. He survived and became a Roman Catholic priest and missionary. He later left the priesthood and married.

== Early life ==
Nothomb was a member of a prominent Belgian family. His father Pierre (1877-1966) was a nationalist, an author, a Catholic, and an early admirer of Mussolini, the fascist leader of Italy. Nothomb joined the Belgian army in 1937 and was taken prisoner by Nazi Germany when it invaded and occupied Belgium in 1940. He escaped from imprisonment in September 1941. He planned to flee to Britain or the Belgian Congo to join the anti-Nazi struggle, but in August 1942 Georges d'Oultremont persuaded him to join the clandestine Comet Line which was dedicated to helping allied airmen, shot down over occupied Europe, evade capture and return to Britain.

== Comet Line ==
The Comet Line leader in Belgium, Jean Greindl sent Nothomb to France to work as an assistant to Andrée de Jongh (Dedée), the young woman who was one of the founders of the Comet Line. The southern sector of the Comet Line reached from Paris to southwestern France and crossed the border into Spain over the Pyrenees mountains. Northomb was picked to work in the southern sector because he was dark-skinned and deemed more likely to pass as Spanish than most French and Belgian men. Operatives of the Comet Line accompanied downed airmen, most of whom did not speak French, by train from Paris to near Bayonne, a journey of about 700 km (430 miles). From there the guides led the airmen on foot across the Pyrenees, avoiding German and Spanish border patrols. In Spain, the airmen were met by British diplomat Michael Creswell ("Monday") who transported them to Gibraltar where they were debriefed by MI9 agent Donald Darling ("Sunday") and then flown back to Britain. As training airmen was time-consuming and expensive, the rescue of downed airmen from occupied Europe and their return to duty was a priority for the British. Elvire de Greef, who led the Comet Line near the border of France and Spain, called Nothomb "Franco" which became his code name (not to be confused with Francisco Franco, the leader of Spain at that time).

Nothomb's first crossing of the Pyrenees was 20 October 1942. He, de Jongh, "B" Johnson, and Basque guide Florentino Goikoetxea led four airmen across the Pyrenees to Spain. De Jongh and he led four more to Spain on 24 October. On 20 December, Nothomb alone guided another four airmen to Spain.

In January 1943, the Comet Line suffered a major reverse when Andrée de Jongh and many other members of the Line were captured by the Germans. Nothomb attempted to organize an operation to break her out of prison but failed. De Jongh's father, Frederic, took leadership but he too was captured in June 1943. Nothomb became the Comet Line leader, basing himself in Paris, and, along with Elvire de Greef, rebuilt the decimated Line. He engaged Marcel Roger ("Max"), later captured, as his assistant. As more and more allied warplanes were shot down over Nazi-occupied Europe in 1943, the demand increased on Comet and other escape lines to help airmen evade capture. Nothomb and Roger guided two parties to Spain in July, four in August, and six in September 1943. Nothomb is credited with guiding or helping guide 215 evaders, mostly airmen, to Spain.

In October 1943, Nothomb was smuggled out of France into Spain. He travelled to Gibraltar in the trunk of Michael Creswell's car and met with MI9's Airey Neave ("Saturday"). MI9 paid the Comet Line for its expenses of caring for and delivering airman to Spain. Neave was concerned that the Comet Line would be unable to meet the challenge of helping increasing numbers of downed airmen. Both the British and the Belgian government in exile wished to aid and supervise the Comet Line. Andrée de Jongh had strongly resisted both governments' attempts to control the Line, insisting that the Comet Line was a volunteer organization, not a tool of governments. Nothomb continued to emphasize Comet's independence in his meetings with Neave although he accepted the British offer to send a wireless operator to Paris to facilitate communication between the Comet Line and MI9. Jacques Le Grelle was the wireless operator. Nothomb returned to Paris from Gibraltar to continue working.

On the night of 23-24 December 1943, Nothomb led a group of nine across the Spanish border. The Bidasoa River was in flood and Comet Line member Antoine d'Ursel and American airman 2nd Lt. J.F. Burch were swept away and drowned.

== Capture and imprisonment ==
On 18 January 1944, Nothomb was captured by Gestapo agent Jean Masson (real name Jacques Desoubrie) in a Paris safehouse. In July 1944 in Belgium, he was sentenced to death by the Germans, but the sentence was not carried out. Allied armies were advancing into Belgium and Nothomb was taken by train to Germany where he was moved from prison to prison. In the chaos of Germany's defeat, his sentence of execution was either forgotten or he was held for a possible prisoner exchange. He was imprisoned in Amberg on 23 April 1945 when the American army liberated the prison. MI9 sent an airplane and flew him to Belgium for a reunion with his family. He weighed 90 lb (41 kg) and had tuberculosis.

== Later life ==
Nothomb spent a year in a sanitarium recovering from tuberculosis. In court, he testified against the German agent, Jacques Desoubrie, but asked that Desoubrie not be executed. Desoubrie was executed. Nothomb enrolled in a seminary and became a Roman Catholic priest in the order called Little Brothers of Jesus. He spent twenty years as a missionary in Algeria and to indigenous people (Indians) in Venezuela. In poor health, he was assigned to work in Rome at the Vatican. He fell in love with an Italian nurse named Anna, left the priesthood, married, and had two children, Agnese and Ghislaine. He died in Rome on 6 June 2008 at the age of 89.
