= Daniela Albizu =

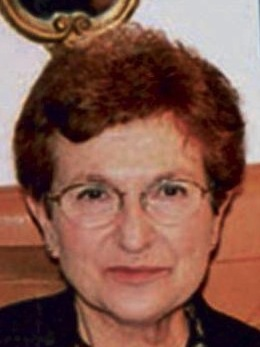
Albizu in 2015

Daniela Albizu Berasategi (Urrugne, Lapurdi, 23 May 1936 - Bayonne, 26 February 2015) was a Basque-speaking teacher, writer, and councillor. She dedicated her entire life to the Basque language and culture.

== Biography ==
Her father was from Alava and her mother from Guipuzcoa, having emigrated to Urrugne. Albizu developed a particular attachment to her mother tongue, Basque, after being prohibited from speaking it at school.

Albizu taught at the Maurice-Ravel College in Saint-Jean-de-Luz. In addition to teaching French and Spanish, she devoted herself to teaching Basque. She promoted the Gau Eskolak initiative of Basque classes on the Gure Irratia radio station in Bayonne and was president of the Basque Studies Society. She was the first nationalist councillor in Urrugne, participating in the organisation of the Herritarrak - Herritarron Alderdia group in 1982.

Albizu wrote several books in Basque, including Hiru uhainak (1979, Elkar), Lau sasoi (2003, Maiatz), and Ilargi eta hontz sorginen ipuinak (2006, Pyrémonde). She also collaborated with Joseba Aurkenerena on a collection of poems and stories which were published in Iturri-aldeko nere leihotik (2011, Maiatz).
