= Ciboure =

Ciboure Ziburu
- Commune
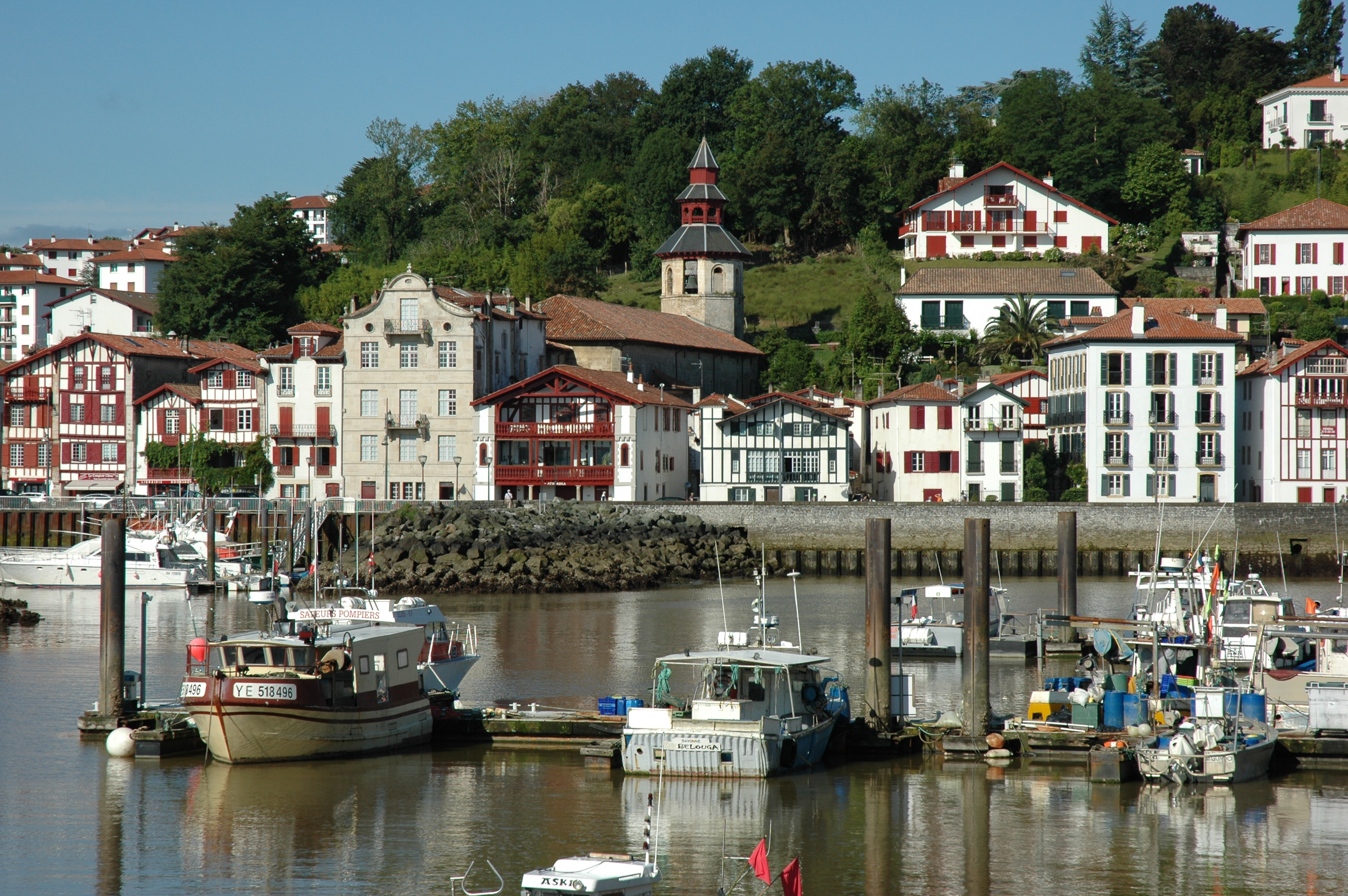
- Ciboure, seen from the harbour of Saint-Jean-de-Luz

- Coat of arms
- Location of Ciboure
- Location within France Location within Nouvelle-Aquitaine
- Coordinates: 43°23′11″N 1°40′00″W
- Country: France
- Region: Nouvelle-Aquitaine
- Department: Pyrénées-Atlantiques
- Arrondissement: Bayonne
- Canton: Saint-Jean-de-Luz
- Intercommunality: CA Pays Basque

Government
  - Mayor (2020–2026): Eneko Aldana-Douat
- Area^{1}: 7 km^{2} (2.7 sq mi)
- Elevation: 80 m (260 ft)
- Highest elevation: 83 m (272 ft)
- Lowest elevation: 0 m (0 ft)
- Population (2023): 5,951
  - Density: 850/km^{2} (2,200/sq mi)
- Time zone: UTC+01:00 (CET)
  - Summer (DST): UTC+02:00 (CEST)
- INSEE/Postal code: 64189 /64500
- ^{1} French Land Register data, which excludes lakes, ponds, glaciers > 1 km^{2} (0.386 sq mi or 247 acres) and river estuaries.

Ciboure (French pronunciation: [sibuʁ]; Basque: Ziburu, meaning 'end of bridge') is a commune in the south-western French department of Pyrénées-Atlantiques.

It lies across the river Nivelle from the harbour of Saint-Jean-de-Luz.

== Geography ==
Ciboure was formerly known as Sibourne in English-language sources.

=== Climate ===
Ciboure has an oceanic climate (Köppen climate classification Cfb). The average annual temperature in Ciboure is 14.7 °C (58.5 °F). The average annual rainfall is 1,483.0 mm (58.39 in) with November as the wettest month. The temperatures are highest on average in August, at around 21.0 °C (69.8 °F), and lowest in January, at around 9.3 °C (48.7 °F). The highest temperature ever recorded in Ciboure was 41.9 °C (107.4 °F) on 30 July 2020; the coldest temperature ever recorded was −12.0 °C (10.4 °F) on 3 February 1956.

Climate data for Socoa, Ciboure (1981–2010 averages, extremes 1921−present)
Month	Jan	Feb	Mar	Apr	May	Jun	Jul	Aug	Sep	Oct	Nov	Dec	Year
Record high °C (°F)	24.6 (76.3)	26.4 (79.5)	29.8 (85.6)	32.5 (90.5)	35.4 (95.7)	39.0 (102.2)	41.9 (107.4)	40.2 (104.4)	38.0 (100.4)	33.2 (91.8)	29.0 (84.2)	26.0 (78.8)	41.9 (107.4)
Mean daily maximum °C (°F)	12.8 (55.0)	13.4 (56.1)	15.4 (59.7)	16.5 (61.7)	19.5 (67.1)	22.0 (71.6)	24.2 (75.6)	24.8 (76.6)	23.4 (74.1)	20.6 (69.1)	16.0 (60.8)	13.4 (56.1)	18.5 (65.3)
Daily mean °C (°F)	9.3 (48.7)	9.6 (49.3)	11.4 (52.5)	12.6 (54.7)	15.7 (60.3)	18.3 (64.9)	20.5 (68.9)	21.0 (69.8)	19.1 (66.4)	16.6 (61.9)	12.3 (54.1)	10.0 (50.0)	14.7 (58.5)
Mean daily minimum °C (°F)	5.8 (42.4)	5.9 (42.6)	7.4 (45.3)	8.6 (47.5)	11.8 (53.2)	14.7 (58.5)	16.8 (62.2)	17.2 (63.0)	14.9 (58.8)	12.6 (54.7)	8.7 (47.7)	6.5 (43.7)	10.9 (51.6)
Record low °C (°F)	−10.8 (12.6)	−12.0 (10.4)	−7.2 (19.0)	−2.4 (27.7)	2.6 (36.7)	4.2 (39.6)	6.4 (43.5)	7.2 (45.0)	2.2 (36.0)	0.5 (32.9)	−5.6 (21.9)	−8.0 (17.6)	−12.0 (10.4)
Average precipitation mm (inches)	139.0 (5.47)	116.9 (4.60)	110.9 (4.37)	137.0 (5.39)	115.1 (4.53)	86.4 (3.40)	70.1 (2.76)	99.6 (3.92)	118.0 (4.65)	152.6 (6.01)	182.0 (7.17)	155.4 (6.12)	1,483 (58.39)
Average precipitation days (≥ 1.0 mm)	13.4	11.9	12.3	14.0	12.4	10.5	8.6	9.8	9.7	12.2	13.1	12.5	140.4
Source: Météo France

== Population ==
Historical population
Year	Pop.	±% p.a.
1968	6,376	—
1975	6,371	−0.01%
1982	6,205	−0.38%
1990	5,849	−0.74%
1999	6,283	+0.80%
2007	6,396	+0.22%
2012	6,855	+1.40%
2017	6,251	−1.83%
2023	5,951	−0.82%
Source: INSEE

== History ==
Ciboure and the neighbouring commune of Saint-Jean-de-Luz were suspected of "incivility" during the French Revolution and, during the Reign of Terror, were merged together under the name Chauvin-Dragon. The name was derived from a revolutionary soldier named Chauvin who, as a member of a dragoon unit, died in the region in early 1793. Although the name was in official use from 1793-1795, it was never used by the inhabitants of the communes and the two were officially separated in 1800.

The Notre-Dame de Bordagain was the only church in Ciboure from its construction in the 12th century through 1575. A tower was added in the 14th century for military purposes. During the Revolution, the church and tower fell into disrepair. The building was restored and turned into a tea house in 1911 by an architect from Saint-Jean-de-Luz. The business performed poorly and a proposal was made to turn it into a casino, which fell through. The church and tower were declared a historical monument in 1987 and were restored in 2010.

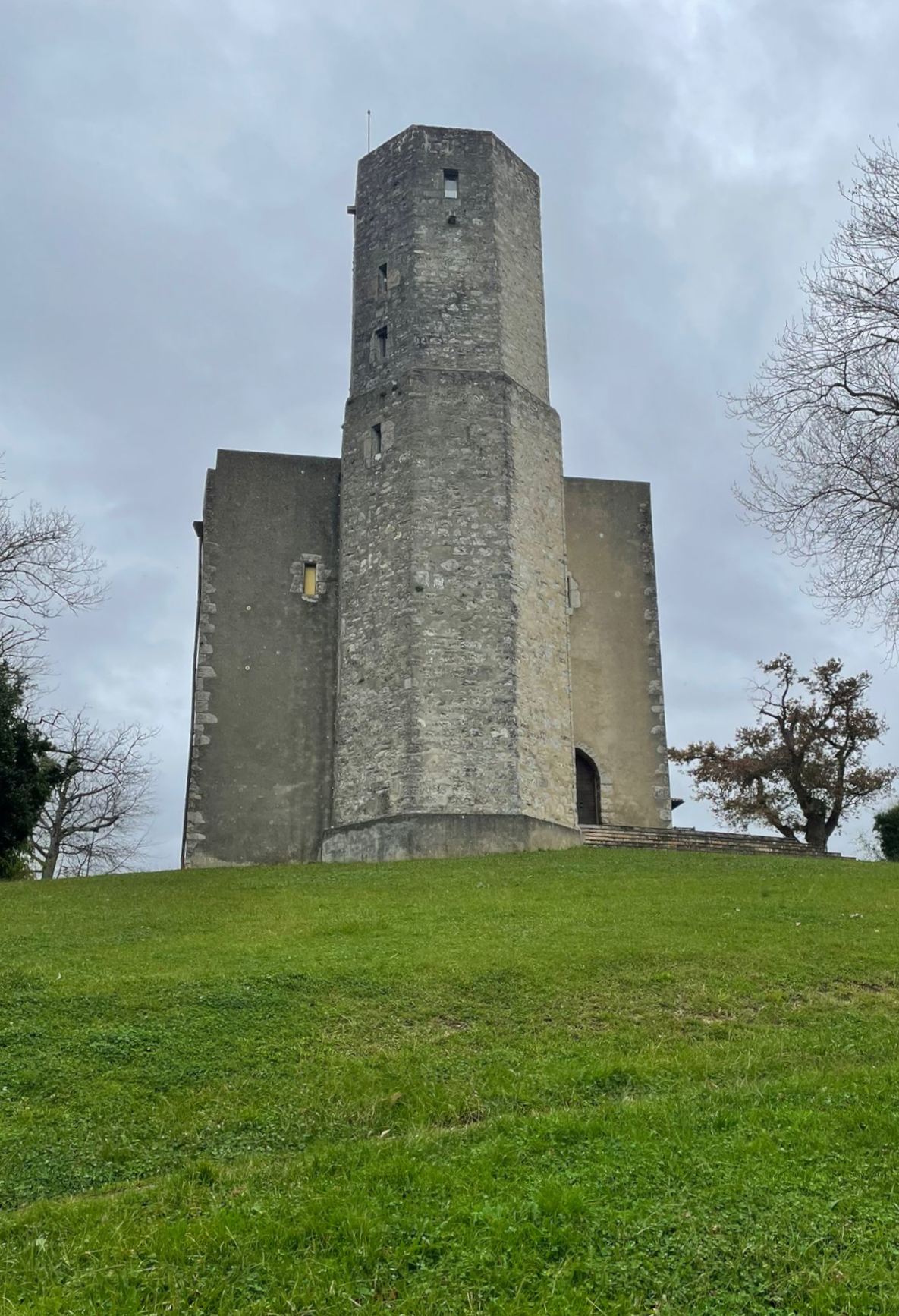
Bourdagain Tower

== Notable people ==
- Kattalin Aguirre, resistance operative, World War II
- Maurice Ravel, composer
- Martin de Hoyarçabal, mariner
- Anne Marie Palli, golfer
- Philippe Bergeroo, footballer and manager
- Michel de Sallaberry, naval officer
- Charles Wertenbaker, journalist
- Timberlake Wertenbaker, playwright
- Florentino Goikoetxea, smuggler and resistance operative, World War II

== See also ==
- Communes of the Pyrénées-Atlantiques department
- Untxin

== Gallery ==
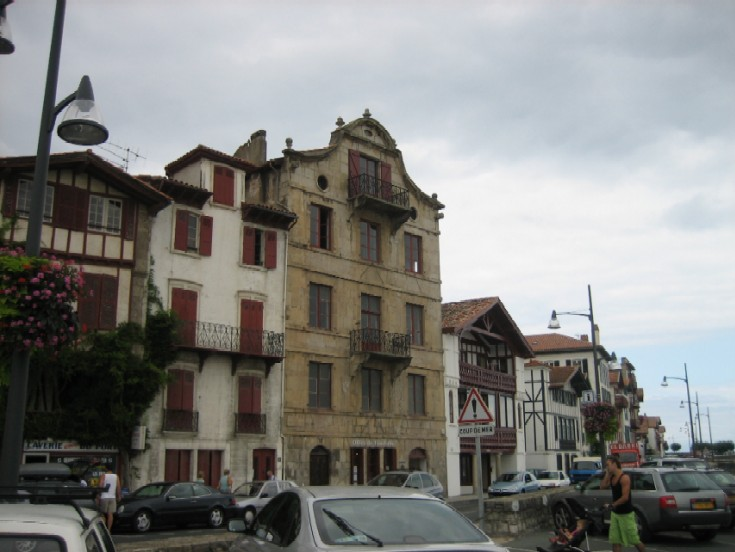
Birthplace of Maurice Ravel in Ciboure

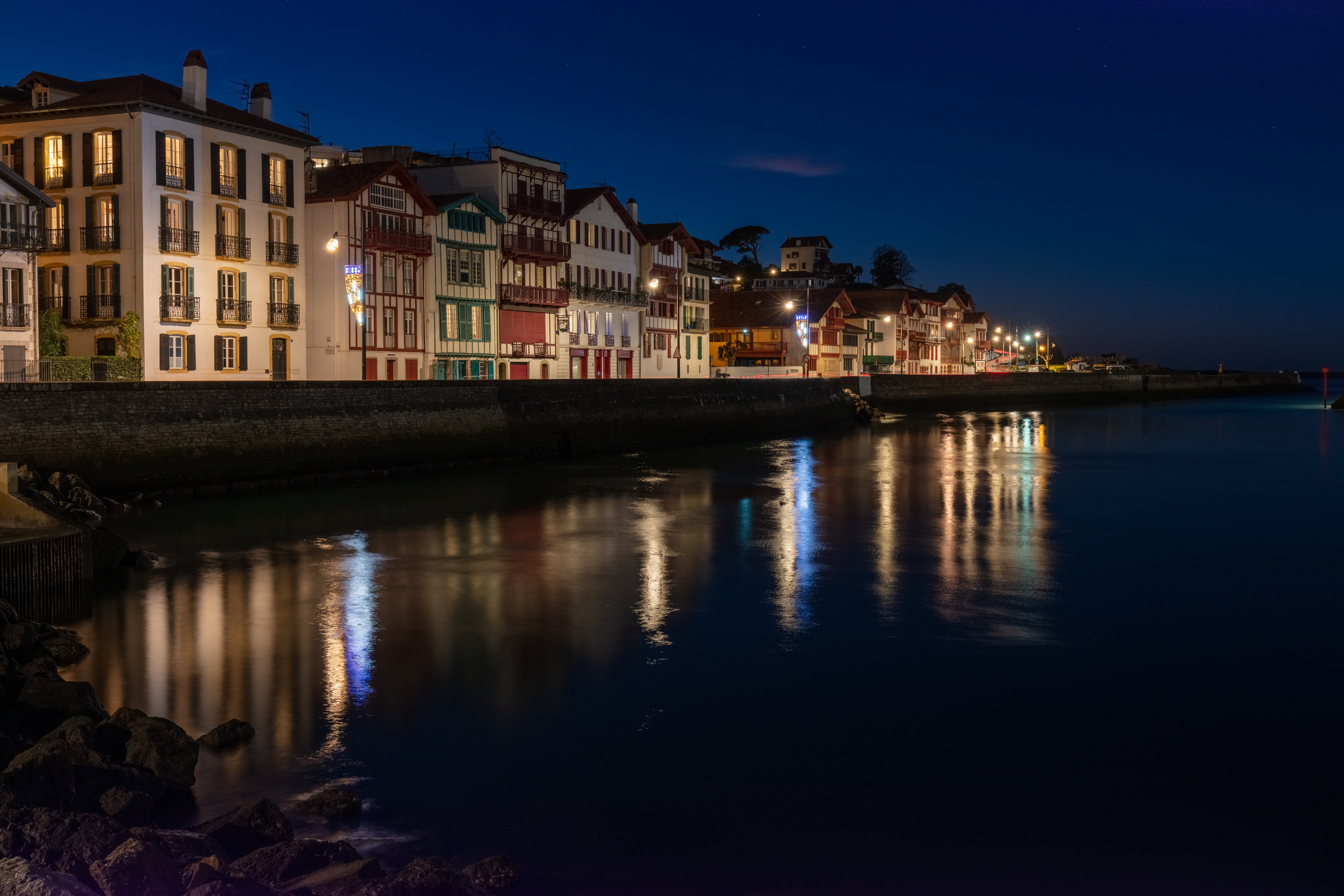
Port of Ciboure

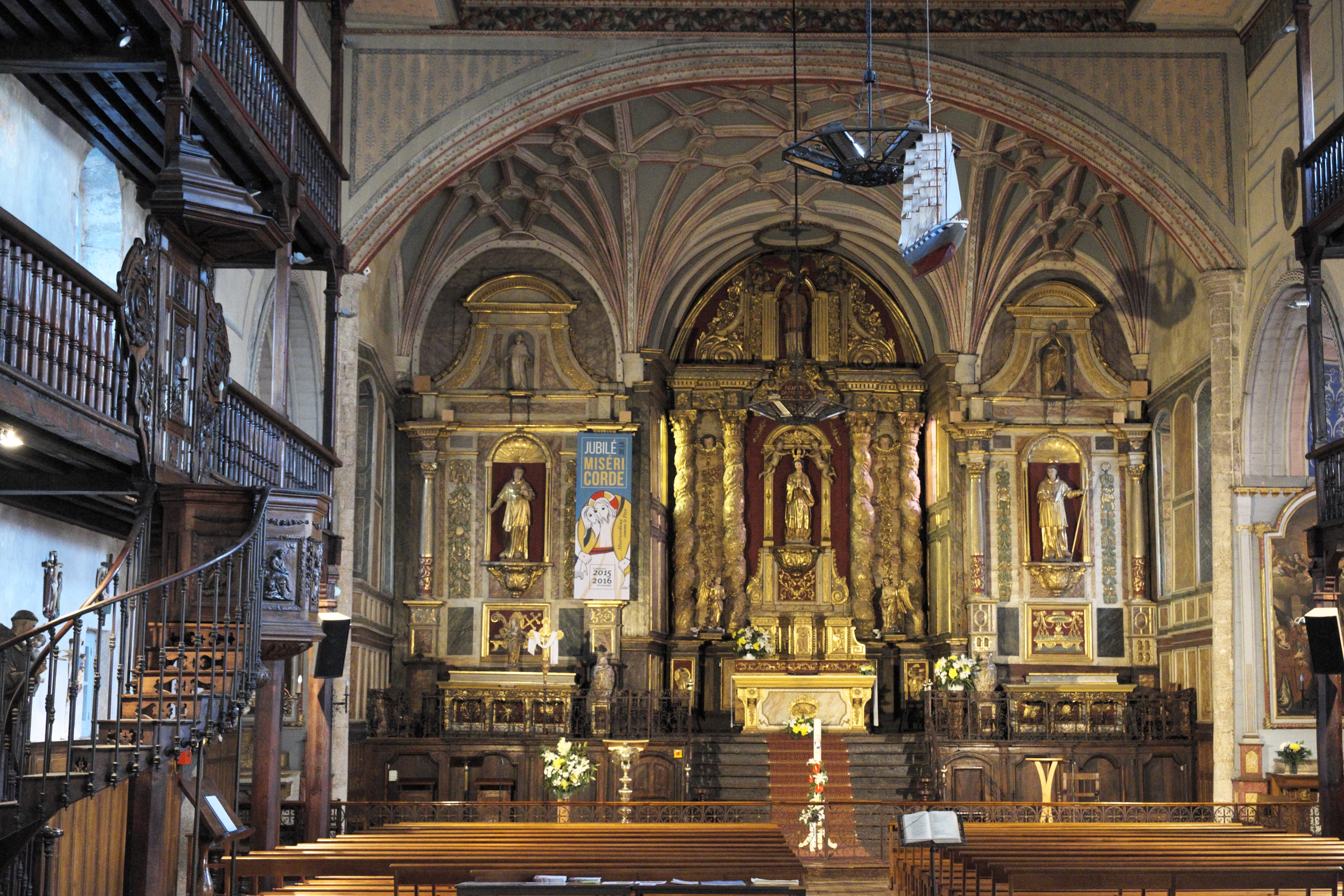
Saint Vincent
