= Donald Darling =

British spy

Donald Darling, code named Sunday (born ?, died 1 December 1977), was an agent for the clandestine British organizations MI6 and MI9 during World War II. The purpose of MI9 was to help prisoners of war to escape and downed airmen and stranded soldiers to evade capture in German-occupied Europe and return to Great Britain. Darling worked in Lisbon and Gibraltar. He financed and advised the escape and evasion lines which rescued soldiers and airmen and guided them to safety in neutral Portugal and Spain and British-owned Gibraltar. The escape lines rescued 7,000 soldiers and airmen in western Europe. Darling met and interviewed many of them on their arrival in Portugal and Gibraltar. As part of his work, Darling contributed intelligence to MI6 about conditions and events inside occupied Europe through knowing many of the key people involved in resistance and escape lines.

As the allied forces reconquered Europe from Nazi Germany, Darling was briefly in charge of the escape and evasion office (Room 900) of MI9 in London. From late 1944 to 1946, he headed the War Office and Foreign Office Awards Office in Paris, searching for missing persons who had worked with the escape lines, recognizing the contributions of escape line workers, and adjudicating claims for compensation.

== Spanish Civil War ==
In 1939 and 1940, Darling worked for the National Joint Committee for Spanish Relief in Spain and France. He assisted refugees from the Spanish Civil War. His knowledge of the border region between France and Spain and his facility with French and Spanish was valuable in his later work with MI9. His involvement with left-wing Republican Spain made him anathema in Francoist Spain. Spain remained neutral during World War II, but leaned toward Germany. Prime Minister Churchill's instructions to British Ambassador to Spain, Samuel Hoare, were to "keep Spain neutral." Hoare was leery of any British action that might push the Franco government closer to Nazi Germany. Because of Hoare's opposition, Darling was unable to base himself in Spain during World War II.

== World War II ==
Darling was in France as an agent of the Secret Intelligence Service MI6 when France was defeated by Nazi Germany in June 1940. He escaped to England. At this time, Darling was described by Airey Neave of MI9 as 'dark-haired and well -built" with "a remarkable memory for faces and names" and a "witty and ingenious" correspondent.

In mid-July 1940, Darling met in London with Claude Dansey, deputy chief of MI6 and influential in the fledgling MI9. Dansey asked Darling to organize a clandestine escape route for MI9 out of France into Spain and Portugal for allied airmen and soldiers. He said that British Ambassador Walford Selby in Portugal was willing to support Darling in his mission. Two days later, Darling was in Lisbon. His cover in the Embassy was as the Vice Consul for repatriation and he was given the code name "Sunday." Darling's mission was secret and he was not popular with the females in the Embassy who considered him "a dashing young fellow with a sports car" who was "doing something with Red Cross parcels when he should be in the [military] forces."

In Lisbon, Darling met with MI6 agent Nubar Gulbenkian, a wealthy British-Armenian businessman, resident in Vichy France, the unoccupied part of France. Gulbenkian agreed to return to Vichy and establish contacts to set up the escape line. Through Gulbenkian, Darling became aware of the Pat O'Leary Line, based in Marseille, headed at that time by Ian Garrow and dedicated to helping British soldiers stranded in France after the Dunkirk evacuation escape to Spain. Gulbenkian arranged for payment by MI9 to guides who would smuggle escaping soldiers across the Pyrenees from France to Spain. During the war, the Pat line smuggled more than 600 allied soldiers and airmen and a large number of other people wishing to escape the Nazis out of France.

=== The Comet Line ===
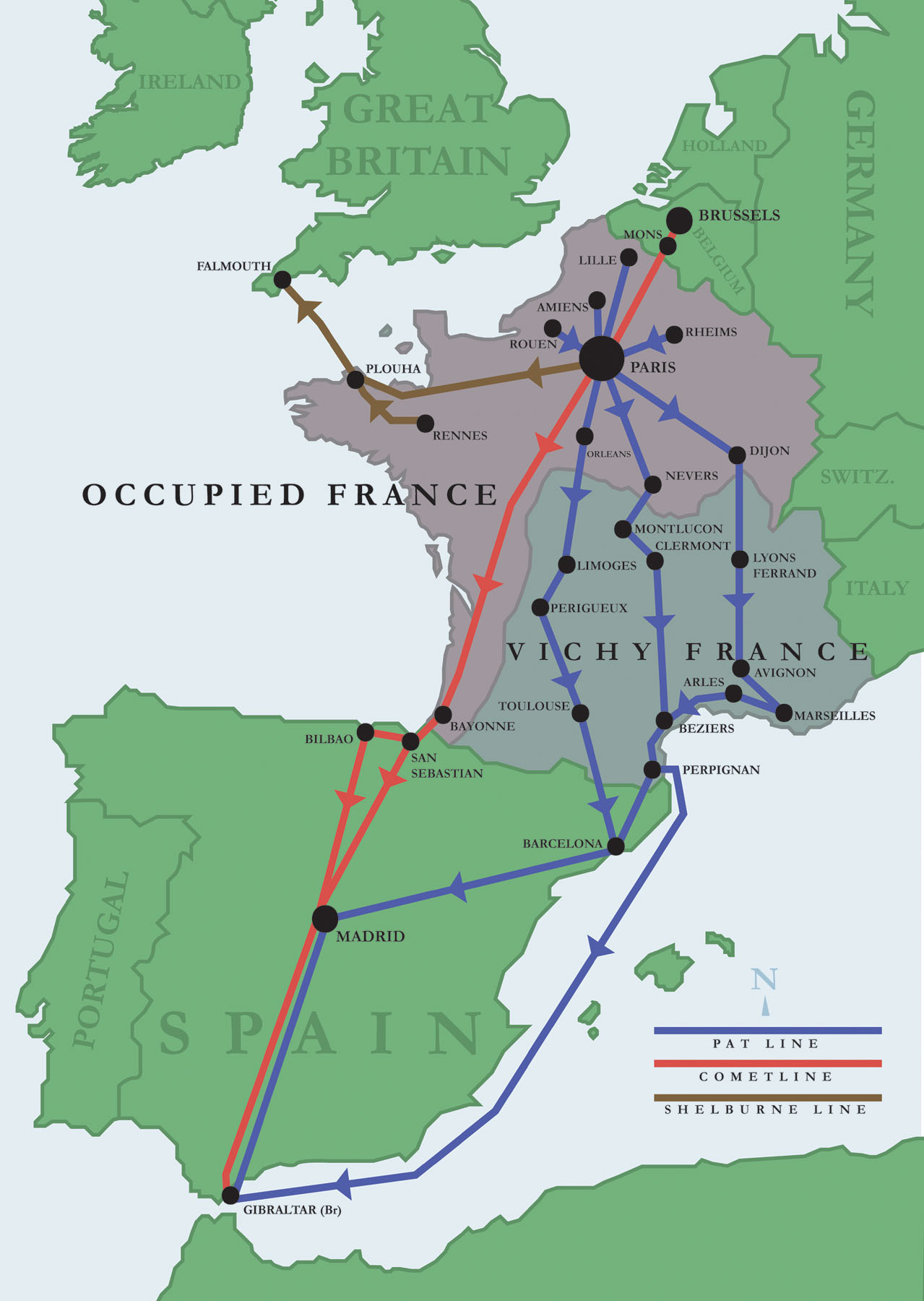
The routes used by the escape lines to smuggle airmen out of occupied western Europe.

In August 1941, a young Belgian woman named Andrée de Jongh appeared unannounced at the British consulate in Bilbao with a British airmen and two Belgian soldiers. She had guided them from Belgium, through France, to Spain and said she could rescue more British airmen if the British paid the Comet Line's expenses. The diplomats in Spain and Dansey of MI6 in London were skeptical of de Jongh, fearing she might be a German agent, but Darling had heard of her through his contacts. He said it was unlikely that she was a German agent and that the men she had smuggled into Spain were "full of admiration for her." MI6 agreed to finance the Comet Line. Darling gave de Jongh the code name "Postman" and her organization became one of the most successful escape lines operating in Europe.

=== Harold Cole ===
In late 1941, the escape lines were infiltrated by German agents and decimated by German arrests of their leadership and workers. A British soldier, Harold Cole, described by a Scotland Yard detective as the "worst traitor of the war," was one of the infiltrators.

In December 1941, acting on Cole's information, the Germans captured many of the Pat lines operatives. Albert Guérisse (also known as Pat O'Leary), head of the Pat Line, informed Darling that he was going to kill Cole. Darling dutifully informed Dansey in London of Guérisse's decision, but Dansey objected. Dansey's opposition to killing Cole has aroused speculation that Cole was a double agent, working for MI6 as well as the Germans, and that Dansey was willing to sacrifice MI9 to protect Cole. Darling disagreed with Dansey and in April 1942, he convened a meeting in Gibraltar with Guérisse and James Langley, a leader of MI9, to discuss killing Cole. However, before Cole's assassination could be accomplished, he was arrested by the Germans for double-crossing the German intelligence agency, the Abwehr. In 1945, Darling identified Cole, freed by the Germans, from a photograph of him masquerading as an American undercover agent. Cole was arrested, but escaped and would later be killed by French police.

=== Gibraltar ===
Darling moved to British-owned Gibraltar on 5 January 1942. Gibraltar became the main destination of downed allied airmen escaping occupied Europe. Numbers of downed airmen were increasing, soon to include Americans as well as British subjects. British diplomat Michael Creswell had the job of moving evaders through Spain to Gibraltar. Darling's main objective in Gibraltar was to arrange for the evacuation of evaders either by air or sea to England. On arrival, he found a backlog of downed airmen awaiting evacuation. In April 1942, he assisted in implementing a plan to pick up evaders by British naval vessels disguised as fishing boats. More than 100 airmen were rescued by the vessels in 1942.

Allied armies invaded German-occupied North Africa on 8 November 1942. On 18 November, Darling asked MI9 to tell the allied forces not to attack a camp in Tunisia which he had learned held 110 British POWs and 100 Spanish refugees

In Gibraltar, Darling interviewed evaders, verified their identities, and collected information from them which he passed along to MI9 in London. From his interviews, he acquired a detailed knowledge of the escape lines and their workers – so much so that his files were kept in weighted sacks to be sunk into the sea if Germany invaded Gibraltar.

=== London and Paris ===
In March 1944, Darling was ordered back to London where he took over the evasion section (Room 900) of MI9 replacing Airey Neave who departed to seek out survivors of the escape networks after the D-Day invasion of France on 6 June 1944. In September 1944, Darling journeyed to Paris where he headed the War Office and Foreign Office Awards Office headquartered in the Grande Hotel Palais Royal. Eventually he would have a staff of 65 persons dedicated to finding the many missing workers of the escape lines and recommending awards and compensation for services contributed by the people who had worked on the escape lines. MI6 gave him the military rank of major. By the time the office closed on 31 July 1946, 112,570 cases and claims for compensation were adjudicated. The cases included investigation of Nazi collaborators, paternity claims, locating lost airmen and soldiers, and identifying those people who had helped evaders.

About 7,000 airmen and soldiers, mostly British and American, were helped by the escape lines to evade German capture in Western Europe (mainly France, Belgium, and the Netherlands) and successfully returned to the United Kingdom during World War II. A large number of other people opposing the Nazis were also helped to escape. One estimate of the number of people who worked on escape lines is 12,000 of whom more than 500 were executed or died in concentration camps. Emaciated survivors of concentration camps, such as Andrée de Jongh and Albert Guérisse, visited the Awards Office.

== After the war ==
In 1946, MI6 transferred Darling to Germany where he investigated the "rat lines" -- the escape routes that helped Nazis escape Germany at the end of the war and relocate to South America and other places. In 1947, he was sent to Brazil to work for the British Central Office of Information.

Darling wrote two books about his WW II experiences: Secret Sunday published in 1975 and Sunday at Large: Assignments of a Secret Agent published in 1977.
