= Florentino Goikoetxea =

Basque smuggler (1898–1980)

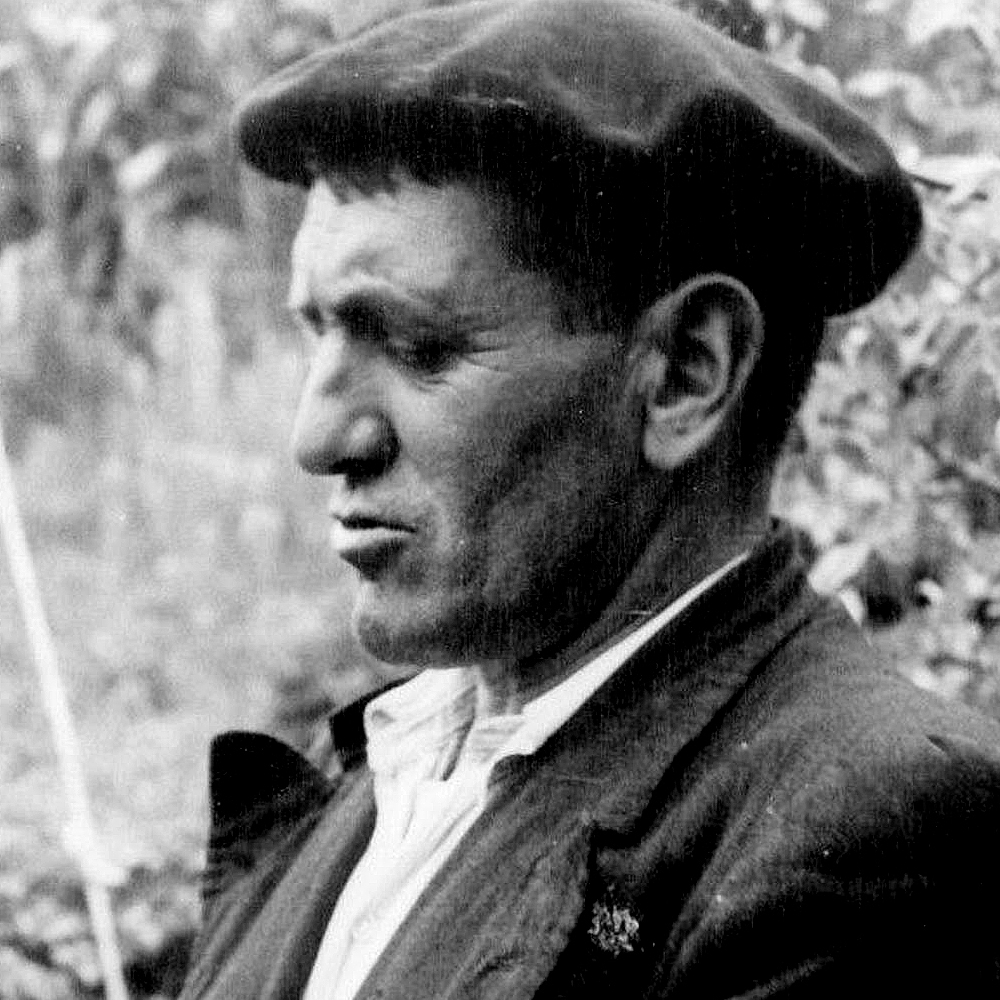
- Goikoetxea in 1945
- Born: Florentino Goikoetxea Beobide; 14 March 1898; Hernani, Gipuzkoa, Spain
- Died: 27 July 1980 (aged 82); Ciboure, France
- Years active: 1941–1944
- Agent: Comet Line
- Known for: assisting Allied airmen to escape occupied Europe in World War II
- Awards: George Medal (United Kingdom); Legion of Honor (France)

Florentino's knowledge of the mountains was fabulous. He was able to find his way even when under the influence of copious quantities of cognac...His tremendous physical strength enabled him to withstand the rigours of constant journeys, summer and winter, from 1941 until the liberation of France in 1944.

— Airey Neave, MI9

Florentino Goikoetxea (Goicoechea, Goikoetxe) (14 March 1898 – 27 July 1980) was a Basque who worked for the Comet Escape Line during World War 2. A smuggler by profession, he guided more than 200 Allied airmen shot down in occupied Belgium and France over the Pyrenees mountains to neutral Spain from where they could be repatriated to the United Kingdom. He was honored with the George Medal from the United Kingdom and the Legion of Honour from France.

== Early life ==
Of humble birth and nearly illiterate, Florentino (as he was universally known) was a hunter as a youth and became familiar with the Pyrenees on the Franco-Spanish border near his home in Hernani in the Basque country of Spain. As an adult he became a smuggler. During the Spanish Civil War, he escaped arrest by the Nationalists of Francisco Franco and fled from Spain to Ciboure, just across the border in France where he resided for the rest of his life.

== The Comet Line ==
In 1941, Belgians Andrée de Jongh and Arnold Deppé created what became known as the Comet Line to help an increasing number of Allied airmen shot down over Belgium, occupied by Nazi Germany, evade capture by the Germans and return to the United Kingdom. In 1941, they pioneered a route by train from Belgium to Saint-Jean-de-Luz in the Basque country of southwestern France and hence by foot over the Pyrenees mountains into neutral Spain. Once in Spain, they turned the exfiltrated airmen over to British diplomats who arranged their return by air to Great Britain. To cross the mountains they hired Basque guides, often smugglers, who could avoid the German soldiers and border guards in France and the border guards in Spain. In April 1942, Florentino Goikoetxea became the principal guide of the Comet Line, and was credited in his Legion of Honor citation with having led 227 airmen and a number of French and Belgian agents across the border to safety in Spain.

Florentino's associates in the Basque country included Elvire de Greef, a Belgian and head of the Comet Line in southwestern France, and Kattalin Aguirre, a Basque women who sheltered escaping airmen in her house. Until her arrest in January 1943, Andrée de Jongh usually accompanied the airmen and Florentino across the border.

== Shot and rescued ==
On 26 July 1944, Florentino was shot four times by German border guards although he managed to hide the documents he was carrying before being captured. His leg was shattered. The Germans took him to a hospital in Bayonne. The local Comet Line helpers decided to rescue him. On 27 July Elvire de Greef visited him in the hospital and told him a rescue would be attempted. Later that day two German-speaking Bayonne policemen showed up at the hospital in an ambulance driven by Fernand, Elvire's husband. They pretended to be Gestapo agents, demanded to take Florentino with them, put him in the ambulance, and drove away. He remained in hiding until the Nazis abandoned southwestern France a month later.

== Awards ==
Florentino, still a wanted man in Spain, kept a low profile after World War II. After Spain's long-time dictator Francisco Franco died in 1975, he was honored with both the George Medal of the United Kingdom and the Legion of Honor from France. When asked what his occupation was in the ceremony at Buckingham Palace, the old smuggler said in broken English that he was in the "import-export business."

== See also ==
- Mugalari
