= Andrée de Jongh =

Belgian World War II Resistance leader (1916–2007)

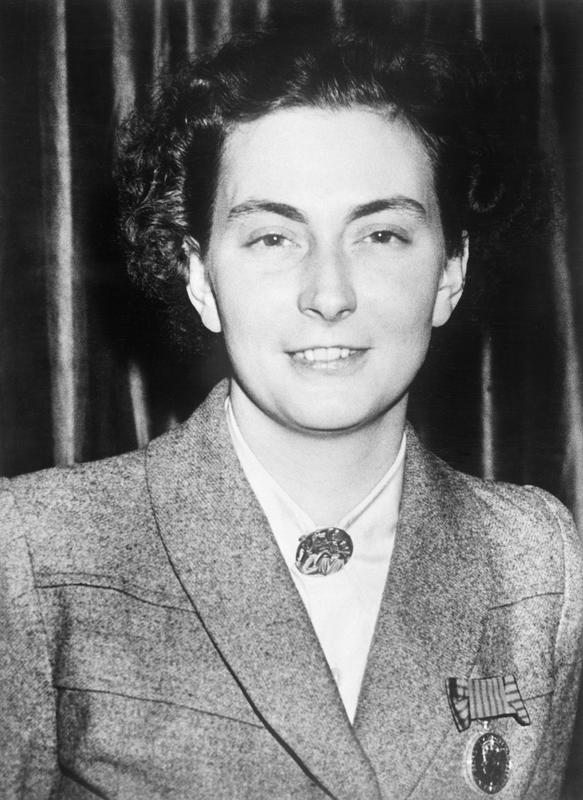
- Andrée de Jongh after visiting Buckingham Palace to receive the George Medal in February 1946
- Born: Andrée Eugénie Adrienne de Jongh; 30 November 1916; Schaerbeek, Belgium
- Died: 13 October 2007 (aged 90); Brussels, Belgium
- Years active: 1941–1945
- Agent: Comet Line
- Known for: Belgian Resistance
- Title: Honorary rank of Lieutenant-Colonel in the Belgian Army.
- Parent(s): Frédéric De Jongh and Alice Decarpentrie
- Awards: Medal of Freedom (United States); George Medal (United Kingdom); Légion d'honneur (France); Order of Leopold (Belgium) (Belgium); Croix de Guerre/Oorlogskruis with palm (Belgium)

My name is Andrée...but I would like you to call me by my code name, which is Dédée, which means little mother. From here on I will be your little mother, and you will be my little children. It will be my job to get my children to Spain and freedom.

— Andrée de Jongh to downed airmen.

Our lives are going to depend on a schoolgirl.

— A downed airman referring to de Jongh.

Countess Andrée Eugénie Adrienne de Jongh (30 November 1916 – 13 October 2007), called Dédée and Postman, was a member of the Belgian Resistance during the Second World War. She organised and led the Comet Line (Le Réseau Comète) to assist Allied soldiers and airmen in their escape from Nazi-occupied Belgium. The airmen were survivors of military airplanes shot down over Belgium or other European countries. Between August 1941 and December 1942, she escorted 118 people, including more than 80 airmen, from Belgium to neutral Spain. From there, they were transported to the United Kingdom. Arrested by the Nazis in January 1943, she was incarcerated for the remainder of World War II. After the war, she worked in leper hospitals in Africa.

De Jongh was the recipient of the George Medal from the United Kingdom, the Medal of Freedom with golden palms from the United States, and many other medals for her work during World War II. In 1985 she was made a countess by the king of Belgium. Her exploits were described in or inspired several books, movies, and television shows.

== Early life ==
Andrée or Dédée de Jongh was born in Schaerbeek in Belgium, then under German occupation during the First World War. She was the younger daughter of Frédéric de Jongh, the headmaster of a primary school and Alice Decarpentrie. Edith Cavell, a British nurse executed in the Tir national in Schaerbeek in 1915 for assisting troops to escape from occupied Belgium to the neutral Netherlands, was her heroine.

She trained as a nurse and became a commercial artist in Malmedy. Her nursing endeavours were inspired by Cavell. She was 23 years old when the Germans invaded and occupied Belgium. De Jongh was described by a British airman she helped as a "frail young girl who appears twenty years [old], very pretty, pleasant, kind, cheerful, and simple. She seems to have the carelessness of a young student who would go on vacation after passing her exams". Later, a British colonel would call her a "pure heroine of legend".

== Origin of the Comet Line ==
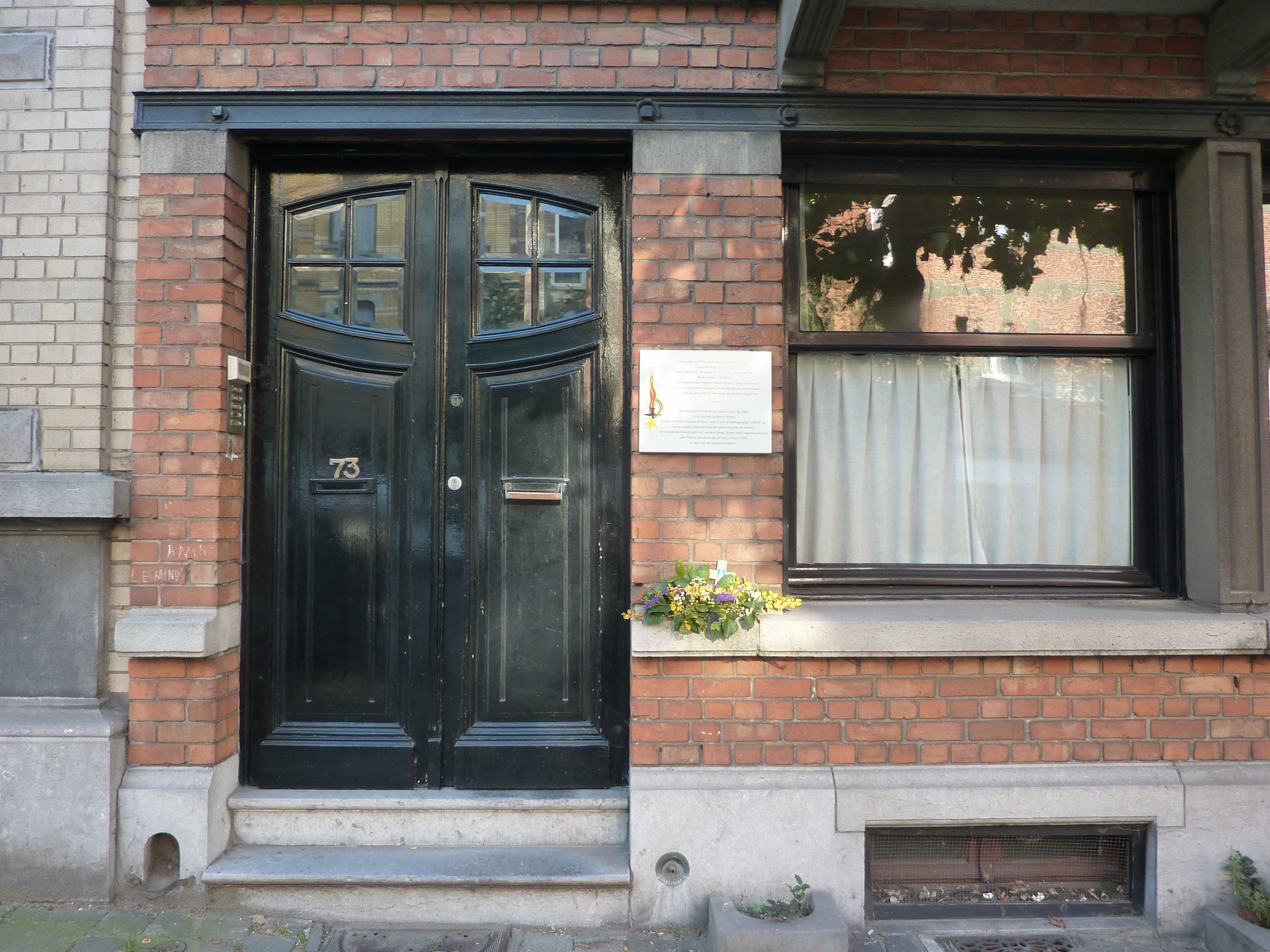
De Jongh's house in Schaerbeek

After German troops invaded and occupied Belgium in May 1940, de Jongh moved to Brussels, where she became a Red Cross volunteer, ministering to captured Allied troops. In Brussels at that time, hiding in safe houses, were many British soldiers, those left behind at Dunkirk and escapees from those captured at Saint-Valery-en-Caux. De Jongh organised a series of safe houses for these soldiers, while also procuring civilian clothes for them as well as false ID papers. Visiting the sick and wounded soldiers enabled her to make links with this network of safe-house keepers who were trying to work out ways to get the soldiers back to Britain.

In spring 1941, Henri de Bliqui, Arnold Deppè, and Andrée de Jongh organised a group of friends to help Allied soldiers and airmen escape occupied Belgium and return to Great Britain. This was the origin of what became known as the Comet Line, the largest of the escape and evasion lines in World War II. They initially called themselves the DDDs after their last names. De Bliqui was arrested in April 1941 and later executed after the group was infiltrated by Prosper Dezitter, a Belgian collaborator with the Germans.

In June 1941, Deppé journeyed from Belgium to southwestern France where he had once lived to look for the means to smuggle Allied soldiers, downed airmen, and other people vulnerable to capture by the Germans out of Belgium. Deppé made contact with Elvire de Greef and her family and arranged for their help in getting people across the border. De Greef became known as "Tante Go" ("Auntie Go").

De Jongh and Deppé, assisted by the de Greefs, attempted their first crossing of the Spanish border in July 1941 with ten Belgians and "Miss Richards", supposedly an English woman but actually a Belgian secret agent named Frederique Dupuich. After they successfully crossed the Pyrenees mountains on the Franco-Spanish border, de Jongh and Deppé left their charges to fend for themselves and returned to Belgium. The ten Belgians and "Miss Richards" were arrested by Spanish police. Three Belgian soldiers among them were turned over to the Germans in France. From this experience, de Jongh realised that in future exfiltrations they must establish a relationship with the British Consulate in Bilbao to ensure the safety in Spain of the people they escorted out of occupied Belgian and France.

In August, Deppé and de Jongh escorted another group of people, de Jongh taking a longer, more rural, and safer route with three men, including a British soldier, and Deppé a shorter, more dangerous route with six men. An informer betrayed Deppé and his party and they were arrested by the Germans. Deppé was imprisoned for the remainder of the war. De Jongh arrived safely at the de Greef house in Anglet and crossed into Spain with a Basque smuggler as a guide. She appeared in the British consulate in Bilbao with a British soldier (James Cromar from Aberdeen) and two Belgian volunteers (Merchiers and Sterckmans), having travelled mostly by train from Brussels to Bayonne and then on foot over the Pyrenees through the Basque Country.

The British diplomats were initially sceptical of de Jongh. It seemed unlikely to them that this young woman with three soldiers in tow had travelled from German-occupied Belgium, through occupied France, and over the Pyrenees to Spain, a straight-line distance of some 800 kilometres (500 miles) (and much further by the roundabout route they had taken). De Jongh promised to exfiltrate additional British soldiers and airmen if the British would pay the Comet Line's expenses which were 6,000 Belgian Francs and 1,400 Spanish Pesetas (the sum of the two currencies amounting to the equivalent of $8,000 in 2025 U.S. dollars) for each Allied airmen or soldier exfiltrated. After three weeks of doubt, suspicion that she was a German agent, and indecision by British authorities in Spain and England, the British agreed to her terms. Except for financial assistance, de Jongh turned down all other British offers of advice and assistance. She rejected efforts by the British and the Belgian government in exile to control or direct the Comet Line. British agent Donald Darling ("Sunday") gave her the code name of "Postman".

== Exfiltrating Allied airmen ==
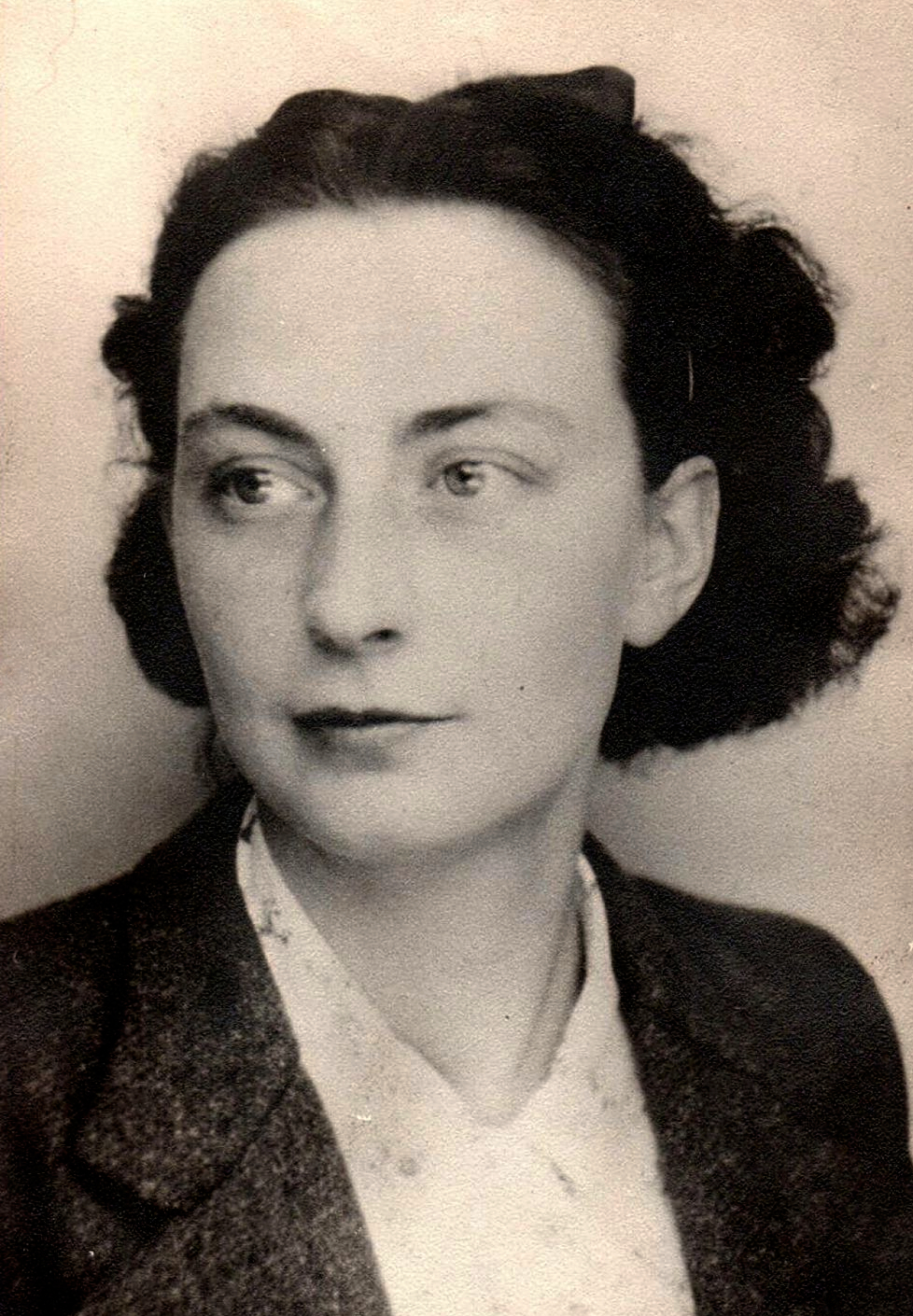
De Jongh in 1941

The arrest of Arnold Deppé in August 1941 introduced a note of caution into the Comet Line. Andrée de Jongh decided that Belgium was unsafe and thereafter worked and lived in Paris and Valenciennes, a French city on the border with Belgium. Her father Frederic took over some of her leadership duties in Belgium. In Paris, Jean-François Nothomb became her assistant. In France, de Jongh received airmen from Brussels, cared for them in safe houses, escorted them by railroad to Bayonne or nearby cities near the Spanish border, and trekked with them across the Pyrenees to Spain. She escorted one group of three airmen in October 1941, another group of three in November, and two groups totaling 11 men in December 1941. That level of activity continued in 1942. Once she had successfully crossed the border, de Jongh turned her charges over to the British who would drive them to Gibraltar where they would be flown back to Great Britain. While the airmen proceeded onward, de Jongh met in San Sebastián with British diplomat Michael Creswell, ("Monday"), who gave her money for the Comet Line's expenses plus messages to take back to France. While returning to Paris she reinforced the system of safe houses and helpers along the route and paid necessary expenses, although most members of Comet Line never received any compensation for their expenses.

Estimates of the number of times that de Jongh successfully escorted downed airmen across the border into Spain in 1941 and 1942 vary from 16 to 24 round trips. The number of persons, mostly airmen, she escorted successfully is about 118.

== Captured ==
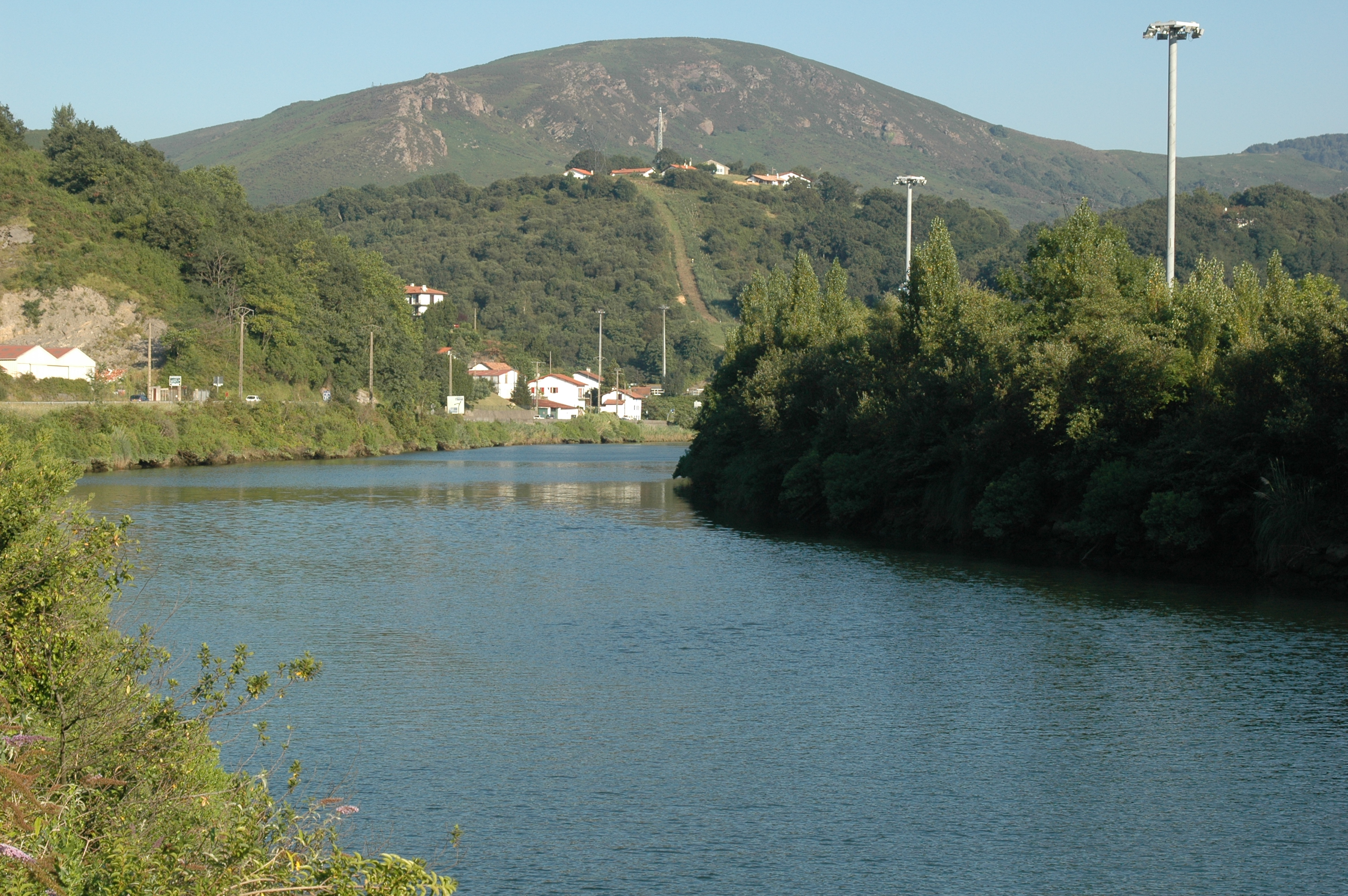
The river Bidasoa, the Franco/Spanish border, near the crossing point of the Comet Line

Comet Line members and their families took great risks. Working for escape lines became more dangerous after November 1942 when southern France was occupied by the Germans and the whole of France came under direct Nazi rule. During the war, hundreds of workers for the Comet Line were arrested by the Geheime Feldpolizei of the Abwehr and many were executed or deported to German prisons and concentration camps.

In January 1943, de Jongh led three British airmen south by train from Paris to Saint-Jean-de-Luz. From the railway station they walked in rain for two hours to the village of Urrugne, in the French Basque Country – the last stop on the escape line before the walk over the Pyrenees. With the airmen and de Jongh was her favorite Basque guide Florentino Goikoetxea, a smuggler wanted by the police on both sides of the border. They arrived at the safe house belonging to Frantxia Usandizanga, a Basque woman, intending to continue to the border, 7 kilometres (4.3 miles) distant. However, the river Bidasoa on the border was in flood and it would be too dangerous to attempt to cross. Goikoetxea went to another house to spend the night and de Jongh and the three airmen spent the night at Usandizanga's house. The next morning, 15 January 1943, de Jongh, the three airmen, and Usandizanga were arrested in the house by ten German soldiers. They had been betrayed, probably by a farm worker named Donato whom de Jongh knew but did not trust.

De Jongh was sent first to Fresnes prison in Paris and eventually to Ravensbrück concentration camp and Mauthausen. She was interrogated 19 times by the Abwehr and twice by the Gestapo. Although she admitted being the leader of the Comet Line to protect her father who was under suspicion, the Germans did not believe that this slight, young woman was more than a minor helper in the Comet Line. Their underestimation of de Jongh's importance in the Comet Line probably saved her from execution. Later, while she was a prisoner in Ravensbrück, the Gestapo realized who she was and searched for her, but she eluded them by hiding her identity.

In de Jongh's absence and under the leadership of Jean Greindl and Antoine d'Ursel, the Comet Line continued to function and helped more than 700 Allied soldiers reach safety during the war. Although de Jongh survived in the concentration camps, she became gravely ill and undernourished by the time she was released by the advancing Allies in April 1945. Many of her colleagues died in captivity. Her father, Frédéric de Jongh was arrested in Paris on 7 June 1943 and executed on 28 March 1944. The three airmen arrested with her survived the war in prisoner-of-war camps. Usandizanga was beaten to death in Ravensbrück by a guard shortly before the camp's liberation in April 1945. Goikoetxea continued to be the preferred Comet Line guide until wounded and captured by the Germans (but rescued by the de Greef family) shortly before France was liberated by the Allies in 1944.

After her concentration camp experiences, de Jongh resurfaced in summer 1945 in the middle of the night at Donald Darling's Paris Awards Office. She still wore the pink and white striped dress that was the camp uniform. She was thin and suffering from health problems that lasted for the rest of her life.

== Later life ==
Post-war, de Jongh finished her nursing studies and worked in leprosariums, first in the Belgian Congo, then in Cameroon, next in Addis Ababa, Ethiopia. and finally in Senegal. While de Jongh was working in Ethiopia, her mother was on her deathbed in Belgium and, in a measure of respect to her, the Royal Air Force made an unscheduled stop in Addis Ababa to take her to Belgium and later returned her to Ethiopia. In 1959, while working at a leper colony in Coquilhatville, she met English novelist Graham Greene. Greene recorded her candid account of her war experiences in his journal which was published in 1961. In In Search of a Character: Two African Journals, Greene wrote that he asked her why she had come to the Congo; she replied, "Because from the age of fifteen I wanted to cure lepers. If I had delayed any longer it would have been too late." In poor health she eventually returned to Belgium with her colleague, Thérèse de Wael.

For her wartime efforts, she was awarded the United States Medal of Freedom with golden palms, the British George Medal on 13 February 1946, and became a Chevalier of the French Légion d'honneur. She also became a Chevalier of the Order of Leopold, received the Belgian Croix de Guerre/Oorlogskruis with palm, and was granted the honorary rank of lieutenant-colonel in the Belgian Army. In 1985, she was made a Countess in the Belgian nobility by King Baudouin.

== Death ==
The Countess de Jongh died on 13 October 2007, aged 90, at the Cliniques universitaires Saint-Luc, Woluwe-Saint-Lambert, Brussels. Her funeral service was held at the La Cambre Abbey, Ixelles, Brussels, and she was interred in the crypt of her parents at the Schaerbeek Cemetery.

== In popular culture ==
- The Last Passage, Lurre Telleria et Enara Goikoetxea, Moztu filmak & Amo films, 2010.
- The Belgian Girls, a dual timeline novel by Kathryn J. Atwood, details the workings of the Comet Line from the perspective of its young female couriers.
- The novel The Nightingale was inspired by accounts of de Jongh.

== See also ==
- The Nightingale (2015) an historical fiction novel inspired by de Jongh's WWII experiences, written by Kristin Hannah.
- The Postwoman (2018) an historical fiction novel based on the story of Andrée de Jongh's life, written by Michael Kenneth Smith.
- Secret Army, a BBC television series, is based on Comet Line operations in Belgium.
- Airey Neave of MI9 was responsible for supporting the Comet Line. His biography of de Jongh is titled The Little Cyclone.
