= Urrugne =

Urrugne Urruña (Basque)
- Commune
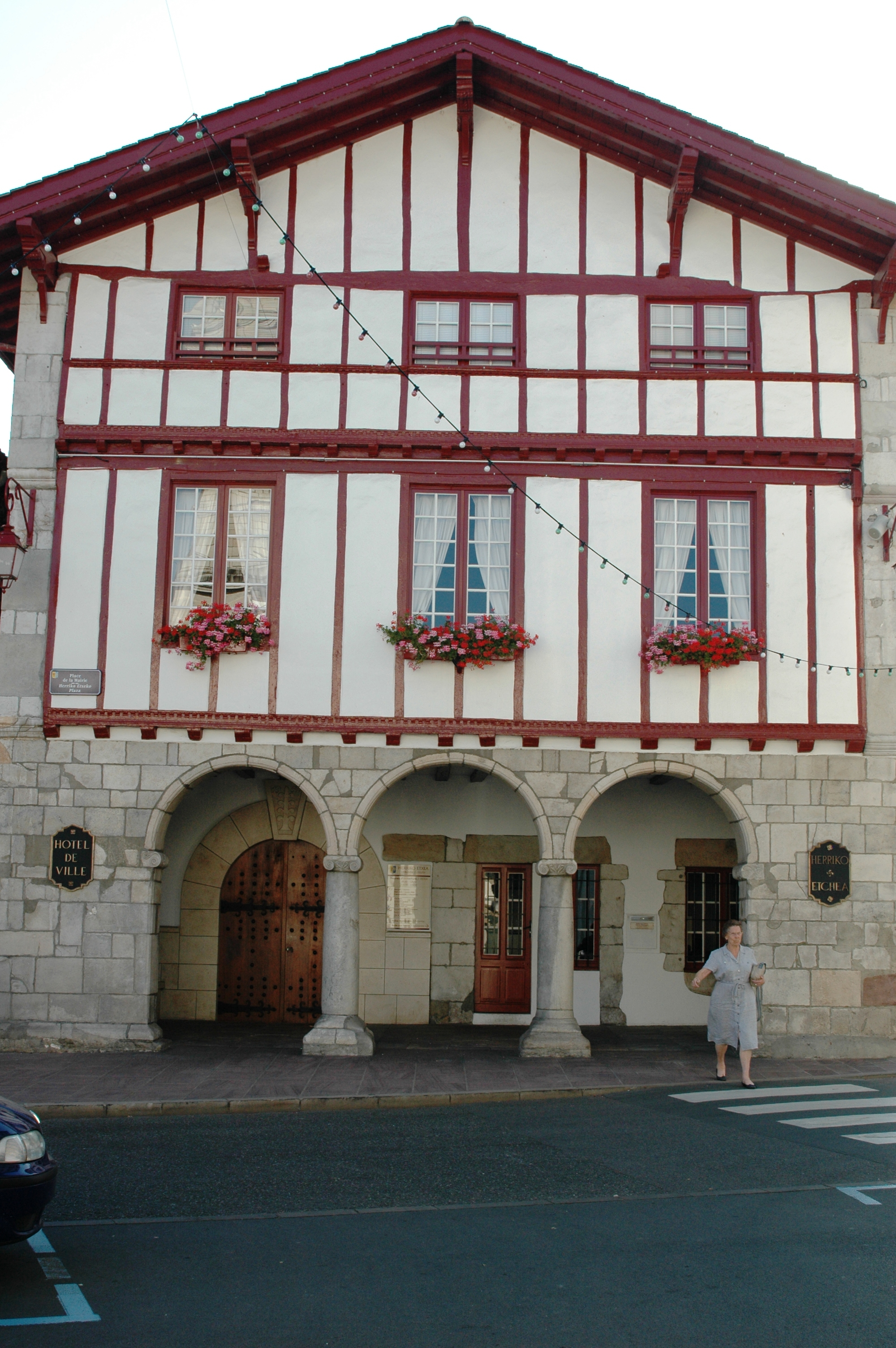
- Town Hall

- Coat of arms
- Location of Urrugne
- Location within France Location within Nouvelle-Aquitaine
- Coordinates: 43°21′47″N 1°41′56″W
- Country: France
- Region: Nouvelle-Aquitaine
- Department: Pyrénées-Atlantiques
- Arrondissement: Bayonne
- Canton: Hendaye-Côte Basque-Sud
- Intercommunality: CA Pays Basque

Government
  - Mayor (2020–2026): Philippe Aramendi
- Area^{1}: 50.57 km^{2} (19.53 sq mi)
- Elevation: 32 m (105 ft)
- Highest elevation: 880 m (2,890 ft)
- Lowest elevation: 0 m (0 ft)
- Population (2023): 10,661
  - Density: 210.8/km^{2} (546.0/sq mi)
- Time zone: UTC+01:00 (CET)
  - Summer (DST): UTC+02:00 (CEST)
- INSEE/Postal code: 64545 /64122
- ^{1} French Land Register data, which excludes lakes, ponds, glaciers > 1 km^{2} (0.386 sq mi or 247 acres) and river estuaries.

Urrugne (French pronunciation: [yʁyɲ]; Basque: Urruña) is a village and a commune in the Pyrénées-Atlantiques department in south-western France. It is part of the traditional Basque province of Labourd.

== Population ==
Historical population
Year	Pop.	±% p.a.
1968	4,245	—
1975	4,571	+1.06%
1982	4,894	+0.98%
1990	6,098	+2.79%
1999	7,043	+1.61%
2007	7,759	+1.22%
2012	9,218	+3.51%
2017	10,317	+2.28%
2023	10,661	+0.55%
Source: INSEE

== Notable people ==
- Daniela Albizu (1936–2015), teacher, writer, and councillor

== See also ==
- Communes of the Pyrénées-Atlantiques department
