= Michael Creswell =

British diplomat

Sir Michael Justin Creswell KCMG (21 September 1909 – 25 April 1986) was a British diplomat. During World War II, he was an attaché at the British Embassy in Spain. He worked with the Comet Escape Line to help allied airmen who had been shot down over Nazi-occupied Europe to escape to neutral Spain and return to Britain. He was Ambassador to Finland from 1954 to 1958, Ambassador to Yugoslavia from 1960 to 1964, and Ambassador to Argentina from 1964 to 1969. In 1961 he attended the 1st Summit of the Non-Aligned Movement in Belgrade as a guest on behalf of United Kingdom.

He was the son of Col Edmund William Creswell (who played for the Royal Engineers in the 1872 FA Cup Final) and Isabel Agnes Vulliamy.

== World War II ==
During World War II, Creswell was stationed as an attaché at the British Embassy in Madrid, Spain. The diplomatic objective of Great Britain was for Spain to remain neutral in the war despite the close association of the Franco government with fascist Nazi Germany and Italy.

In August 1941, a young Belgian woman, Andrée de Jongh, appeared in the British consulate in Bilbao along with a British soldier and two Belgian volunteers. She had guided them through Nazi-occupied Belgium and France to Spain, traveling mostly by train but crossing the Pyrenees mountains into Spain on foot, evading capture by both the Germans and Spanish border guards. As the leader of a volunteer organization called the Comet Line, she said she would exfiltrate additional Allied soldiers and airmen from occupied Europe. She asked the British to pay the Comet Line's expenses of 6,000 Belgian francs and 1,400 Spanish pesetas (the sum of the two currencies amounting to the equivalent of $2,000 in 2018 U.S. dollars) for each Allied airmen or soldier exfiltrated.

The British consul in Bilbao reported de Jongh's visit to Creswell, code named "Monday," in Madrid. When de Jongh reappeared at the Bilbao consulate in October 1941 with additional British soldiers, Creswell journeyed to meet her and concluded an agreement with her for the British to finance the Comet Line. Except for money, de Jongh turned down all other British offers of advice and assistance. She retained her operational independence. Creswell became her link in Spain. During the next three years, until the reconquest of western Europe by the allies, De Jongh and other Comet Line guides accompanied hundreds of allied military personnel to Spain. Most of the exfiltrated military personnel were airmen shot down over Europe who had evaded capture by the Germans and made their way to Spain with the help of the Comet or other escape lines. Once the airmen were in Spain, Creswell met them near the city of San Sebastián and drove them to the British Embassy in Madrid. From there the airmen were driven to British-controlled Gibraltar from where they were returned to Britain by air or sea. Creswell also served as an intermediary between the Comet Line and MI9 in London, receiving and delivering messages and money.

By October 1943, most leaders of the Comet Line, including de Jongh, had been imprisoned or killed by the Germans. Creswell smuggled the new Comet Line leader, Baron Jean-François Nothomb, into Gibraltar in the boot of his Bentley automobile. There, Creswell and Nothomb met with Airey Neave of the MI9 section of the British Directorate of Military Intelligence, a highly secret department of the War Office. The meeting secured the continued operation of the Comet Line despite its decimation by the Germans.
