= Medal of Freedom (1945) =

American civil decoration awarded 1945–1961

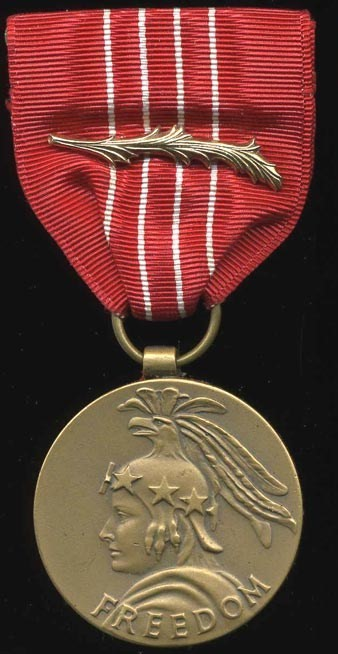
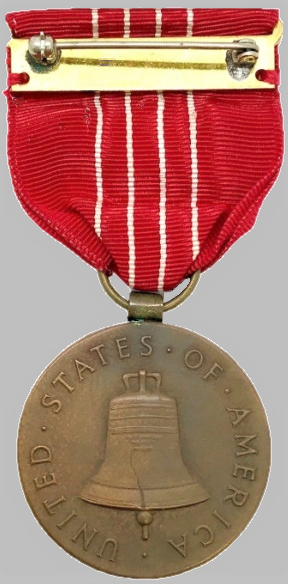
- Obverse and reverse of medal with palm device
- Type: Medal
- Awarded for: "A meritorious act or service which has aided the United States in the prosecution of a war against an enemy or enemies and for which an award of another United States medal or decoration is considered inappropriate"
- Country: United States
- Presented by: the Secretary of State, Secretary of War or Secretary of the Navy
- Eligibility: Any person not a member of the armed forces of the United States
- Status: Replaced 22 February 1963 by Presidential Medal of Freedom
- Established: 1945
- First award: 1945
- Final award: 1962

Highlights
- Total: Over 20,000
- Ribbon bar of the medal

Precedence
- Next (higher): Medal for Merit
- Next (lower): unspecified

The Medal of Freedom was a decoration established by President Harry S. Truman to honor civilians whose actions aided in the war efforts of the United States and its allies during and beyond World War II. It was intended to be awarded by the secretary of state, the secretary of war, or the secretary of the Navy, but presidents Dwight D. Eisenhower and John F. Kennedy also authorized awards. The first woman and American citizen to receive it was Anna M. Rosenberg by Robert P. Patterson on the recommendation of Eisenhower.

== Description ==
The medal is a bronze disc whose obverse features the profile of the Statue of Freedom of the US Capitol Building, with the word "FREEDOM" in capital letters in an arc at the bottom of the disc. The reverse features the Liberty Bell surrounded by the words "UNITED STATES OF AMERICA" in capital letters. The medal is suspended on a red ribbon with four thin white stripes. The original Executive Order 9586 establishing the medal specified "No more than one Medal of Freedom shall be awarded to any one person, but for a subsequent act or service justifying such an award a suitable device may be awarded to be worn with the medal" and bronze, silver, and gold palm devices were produced and awarded. There is no evidence of U.S. citizens having received these palm devices, whereas some non-U.S. citizens did receive them (e.g. Micheline "Michou" Dumon, Nancy Wake and Andrée de Jongh), and the devices have been interpreted as signifying degrees of the award.

== Ribbons ==

Without palm

With bronze palm

With silver palm

With gold palm

== Recipients ==
- Beulah Estelle Ream Allen Jarvis (World War II), Volunteer Civilian Surgeon for the US Army. Received 1945

== See also ==
- Presidential Medal of Freedom
- Awards and decorations of the United States government
