= Clypeola elegans =

Scientific classification
- Kingdom: Plantae
- Clade: Tracheophytes
- Clade: Angiosperms
- Clade: Eudicots
- Clade: Rosids
- Order: Brassicales
- Family: Brassicaceae
- Genus: Clypeola
- Species: C. elegans

Binomial name
- Clypeola elegans Boiss. & A. Huet

Synonyms
- Alyssum elegans (Boiss. & A.Huet) Al-Shehbaz; Jonthlaspi elegans (Boiss. & A.Huet) Kuntze

Species of flowering plant

Clypeola elegans is a species of flowering plant in the family Brassicaceae. It is native to Iran, Transcaucasia and Turkey.

The type specimen is kept at the Royal Botanic Gardens, Kew.
