= Anglet =

Anglet Angelu
- Commune
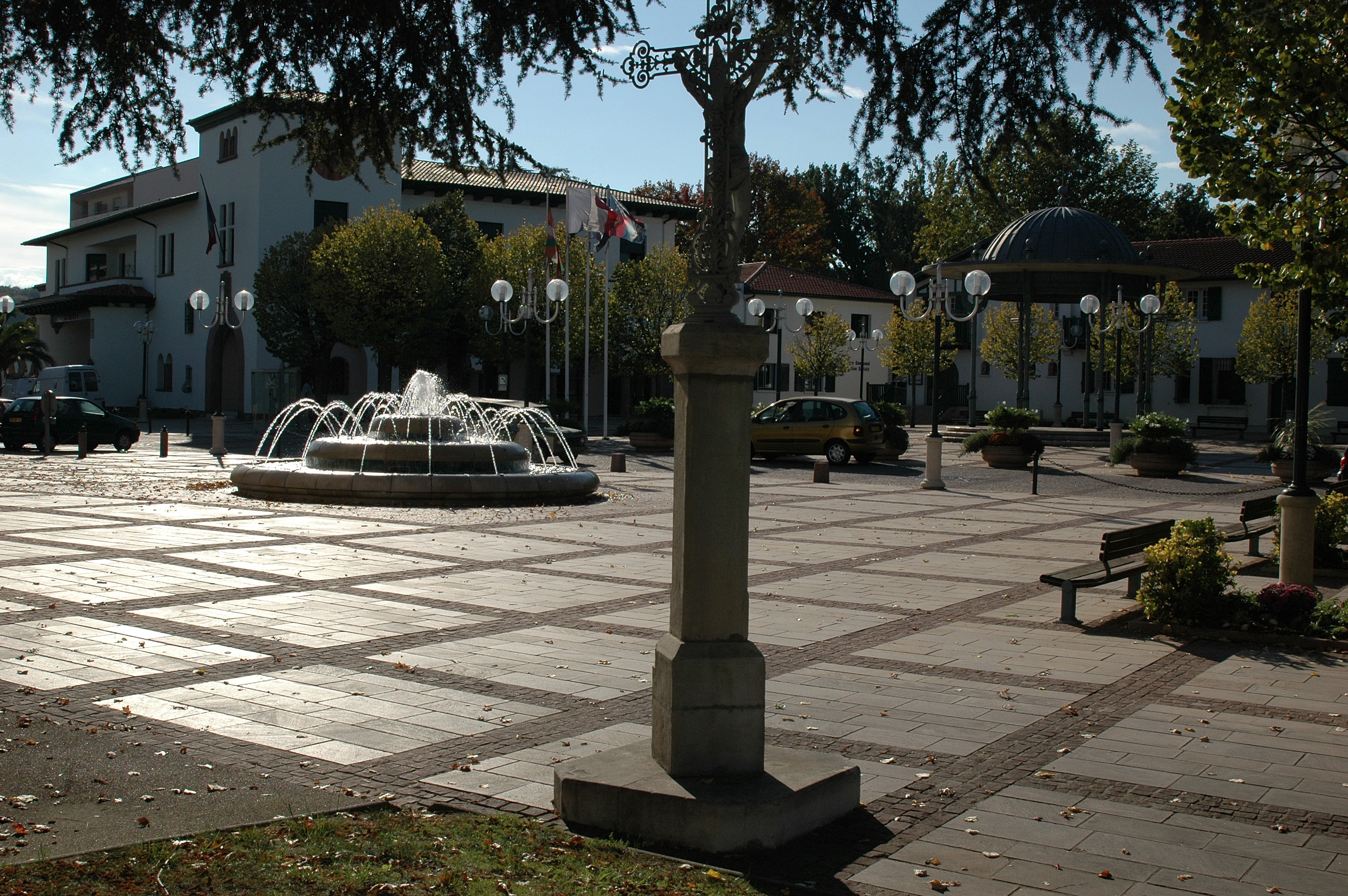
- The Hôtel de Ville

- Coat of arms
- Location of Anglet
- Location within France Location within Nouvelle-Aquitaine
- Coordinates: 43°29′06″N 1°31′06″W
- Country: France
- Region: Nouvelle-Aquitaine
- Department: Pyrénées-Atlantiques
- Arrondissement: Bayonne
- Canton: Anglet, Bayonne-1
- Intercommunality: Pays Basque

Government
  - Mayor (2026–32): Claude Olive
- Area^{1}: 26.93 km^{2} (10.40 sq mi)
- Elevation: 38 m (125 ft)
- Highest elevation: 76 m (249 ft)
- Lowest elevation: 0 m (0 ft)
- Population (2023): 43,271
  - Density: 1,607/km^{2} (4,162/sq mi)
- Time zone: UTC+01:00 (CET)
  - Summer (DST): UTC+02:00 (CEST)
- INSEE/Postal code: 64024 /64600
- Website: www.anglet.fr
- ^{1} French Land Register data, which excludes lakes, ponds, glaciers > 1 km^{2} (0.386 sq mi or 247 acres) and river estuaries.

Anglet (French: [ɑ̃ɡlɛt]; Occitan: [aŋˈɡlet], Basque: Angelu [aŋɡelu]) is a commune in the Pyrénées-Atlantiques department in the Nouvelle-Aquitaine region of southwestern France.

Anglet lies in the traditional province of Labourd of the Northern Basque Country while its inhabitants have traditionally spoken Gascon (Occitan).

== Geography ==
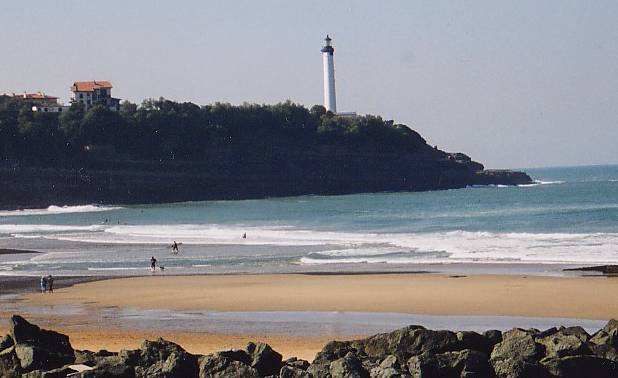
Beach on the Chambre d’Amour at Anglet and Biarritz lighthouse

=== Location ===
Anglet commune is part of the urban area of Bayonne-Anglet-Biarritz (B.A.B.) located south-west of the city and part of the Basque province of Labourd. The commune is 10% covered with pine forests, including those of Pignada, Lazaretto, and Chiberta. The sandy coast starts 200 km north at the Pointe de Grave on the shore of the estuary of the Gironde and ends in Anglet. It is punctuated by numerous seawalls cutting the shore. At Anglet the outline of the public maritime domain has been updated and a coastal reserve forty metres (130 feet) wide has been observed since 1978. With its many bays and inlets this area is a laboratory for monitoring techniques for studying coastal erosion.

The Anglet coast is about 4.5 km long and has 11 beaches from north to south:

- Beach of la Barre;
- Beach of les Cavaliers;
- Beach of les Dunes;
- Beach of l'Ocean;
- Beach of la Madrague;
- Beach of la petite Madrague;
- Beach of les Corsaires;
- Beach of la Marinella;
- Beach of les Sables d'or;
- Beach of Club;
- Beach of VVF (Village Vacances Famille).

The French Basque Coast designates the part of the Aquitaine coast between the Chambre d'Amour cave at Anglet and the Spanish border.

Anglet has an airport Aéroport de Biarritz-Anglet-Bayonne some 2 kilometres (1.2 miles) south of the town accessible from the D810 road. It has flights to destinations across France as well as Europe.

=== Access ===
Anglet is served by the A63 autoroute, the D810 road from Bayonne to Anglet town, and the D260 road from Bayonne to the northern part of the commune and continuing south-west towards Biarritz.

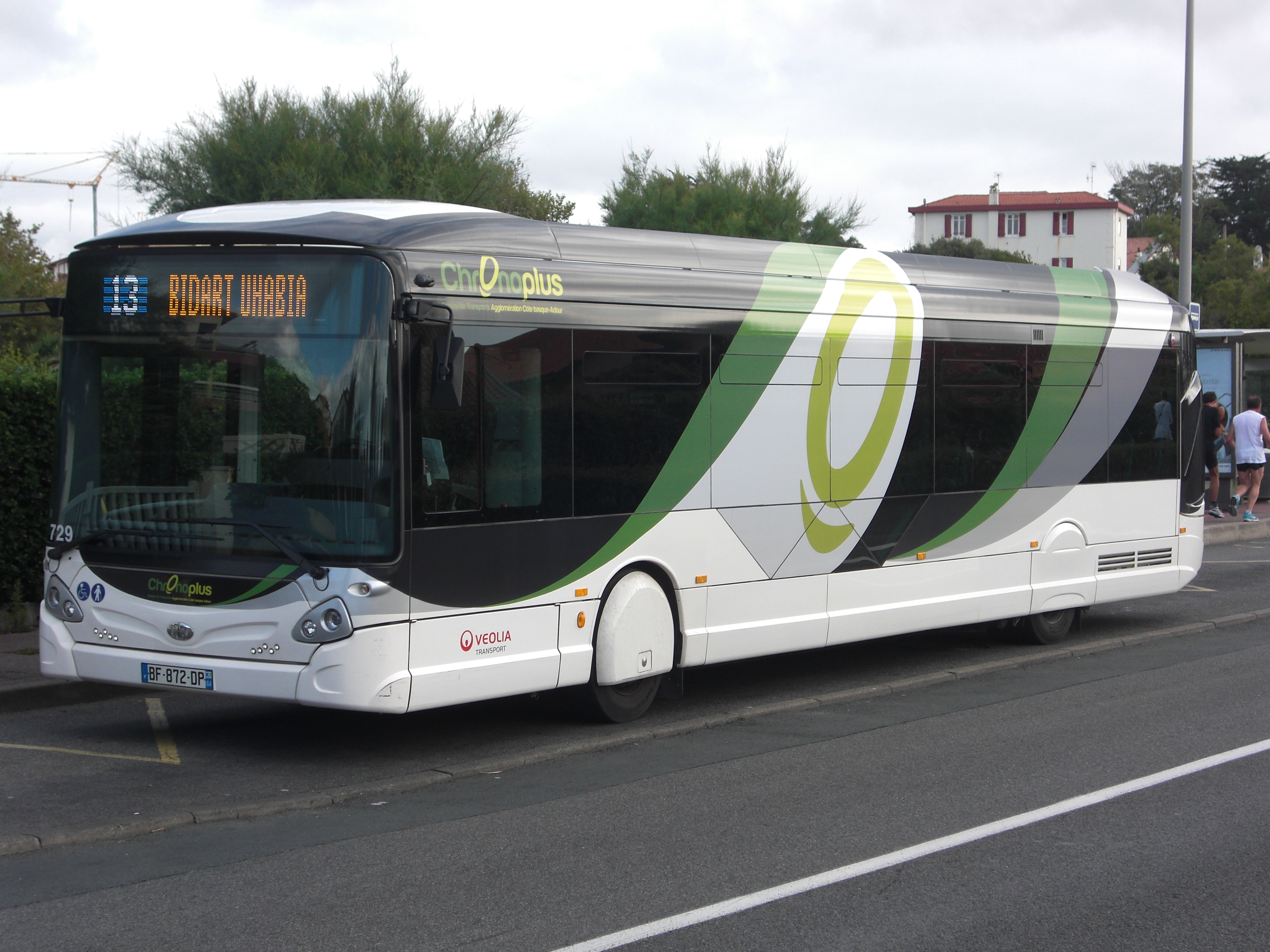
Chronoplus Bus Terminus for the Anglet beaches.

During the winter season of 2013–2014 the A1, A2, C, 4, 5, 6, 8, 10, 11, 12, 14, and N (evening) Chronoplus bus routes operated by the Transdev agglomeration de Bayonne serve Anglet connecting it to other communes in the metropolitan area: Bayonne, Biarritz, Bidart, Boucau, Saint-Pierre-d'Irube, and Tarnos.

=== Hydrography ===
The Adour flows into the Atlantic Ocean (Bay of Biscay) between Anglet on the left bank and Tarnos on the right bank.

The commune is traversed by the following tributaries of the Adour:

- the Sarraoute
- the Artigou (as well as the tributary of this - the Zubiru with its own tributary the Hòssa)
- the Camoudiet (and its tributaries, the Aouassole and the Riu Tòrt)
- the Horc (with its tributaries - the Coumelade, the Mail, and the Canaou)
- the Prade (joined by the Horn)
- the Gaoube (and the Arm of the Gaoube)
- the Houillassat
- the Gaoubole
- the Hourclat
- the Larraoudille
- the Bon
- the Adour de Gripp (as well as its tributaries - the great Canabère, the Garet, the Picharotte, the Goutil de Thou, and the Aritz and its tributary the Goutil Sec)
- the May d'Escaret
- the Arrimoula
- the Adour de Lesponne (and its tributaries, the Cantalop, the Lhécou, the Riu Grand, the Brouilh, the Maouri, the Tos - and its tributaries: the Népoutre, the Arabède, and the Cétérou; the Narbeoz, the Beliou, the Binaros, the Glère - and its tributaries: the Great Garrot, the Lardezen, and the Hont Herèda)
- the Serris

=== Localities and hamlets ===
- Aritxague
- la Barre
- Blancpignon
- Bois Belin
- le Brise-Lames
- la Butte aux Cailles
- Camiade
- Cantau
- les Cavaliers
- la chambre d'Amour
- Chassin
- Château de Brindos
- Chiberta
- Choisy
- Cinq Cantons
- les Corsaires
- Courbois
- Girouette
- Hailtz
- Hardoy
- El Hogar
- Hondritz
- Irumendy
- Jorlis
- le Lazaret
- Louillot
- la Madrague
- Maignon
- Marinella
- Mauléon
- Montbrun
- Montdeville
- Moulinau
- l'Océan
- le Pavillon Chinois
- Péan
- Le Phare
- le Pignada
- Port du Soufre
- Quatre Cantons
- Refuge Notre-Dame
- les Sables d'Or
- Saint-Bernard
- Saint-Jean
- Salines
- Stella-Maris
- Sutar
- Tivoli
- Tour de Lannes
- Les Trois Croix
- Troissonat
- l'Union

== Toponymy ==
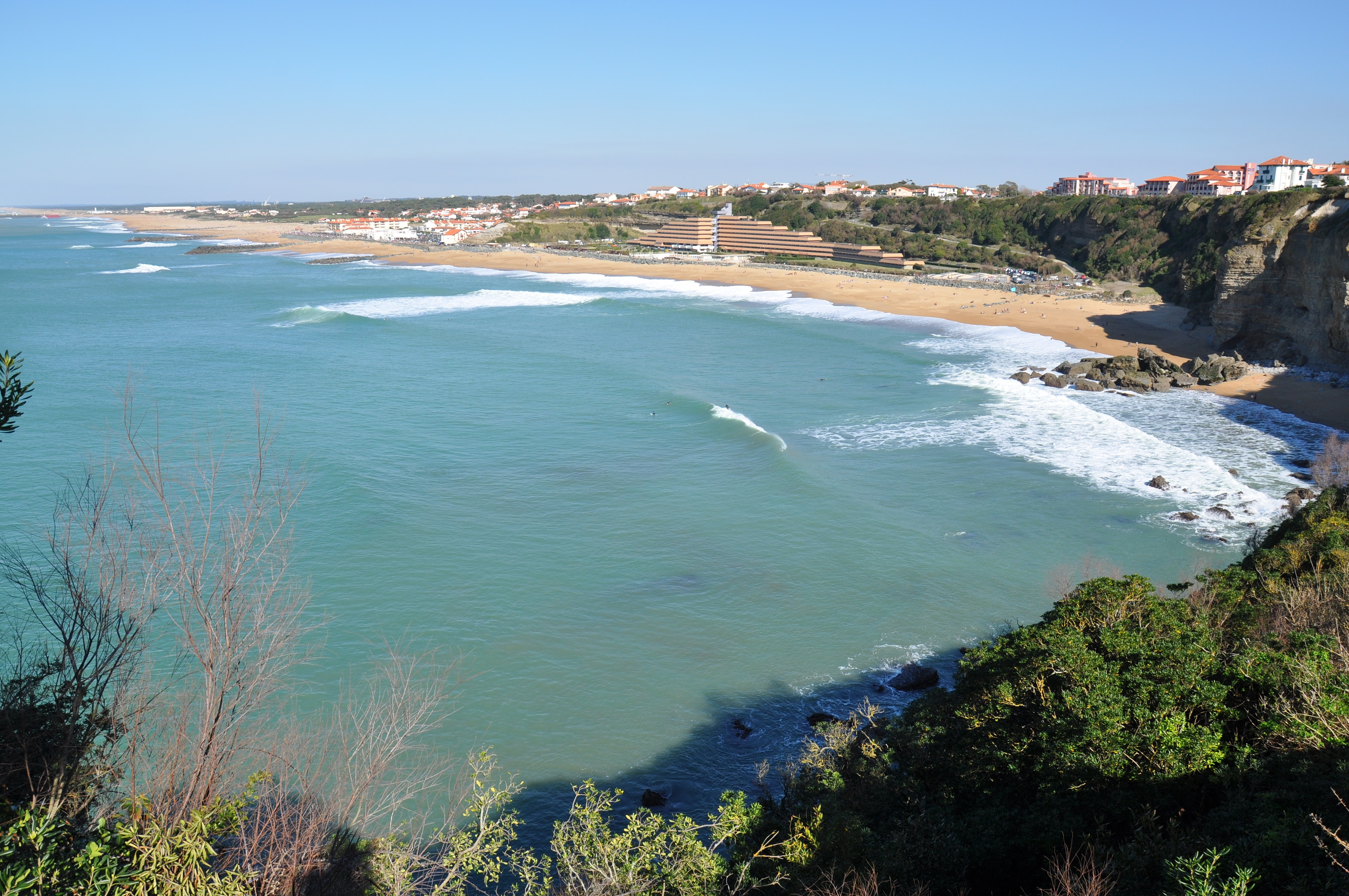
Panorama of the beaches of Anglet from la Barre (at left) towards the cliffs at the House of Love (at right)

The origin of the name Anglet is Roman from the Latin angulus, "Land shaped like a wedge" or "low terrain or depression". This last hypothesis was confirmed by Jean-Baptiste Orpustan who indicated that the official name and the basque name derived from two distinct strains of the same origin: angellu, a diminutive of Angulu, and cited by L. Michelena who affirmed that "low terrain" applies to "all the sandy beach-front in the commune".

The Basque name of the commune is Angelu and the Gascon name is Anglet. The inhabitants are known as Anglòi in Gascon and Angeluar in Basque.

The following table details the origins of the commune name and other names in the commune.

Name	Spelling	Date	Source	Page	Origin	Description
Anglet	Angles	1188	Raymond	6	Cartulary	Village
	Anglet	1249 & 1253	Orpustan	28		
	Portu de Angleto	1291	Orpustan	28		
	Sanctus Leo d'Anglet	1761	Raymond	6	Collations	
Aritxague	Urruzaga	1140	Raymond	142	Cartulary	Mill, from the Basque Haritzaga meaning "place of oaks" (tauzins).
	Urrucega	1149	Raymond	142	Cartulary	
	Urrusague	12th century	Raymond	142	Cartulary	
	Aritzague	1750	Raymond	142	Cassini	
	Ritzague	1863	Raymond	142		
Chambre d'Amour	Ygasc	1198	Raymond	48	Cartulary	Hamlet, from a cave next to the sea.
	Higas	12th century	Raymond	48	Cartulary	
Audios	Audoz	1198	Raymond	48	Cartulary	Hamlet in 1863
Blancpignon	Blanpignon	1863	Raymond	33		Place
Brindos	Villa que dictur Berindos	12th century	Raymond	36	Cartulary	Hamlet
	Beryndos	1331	Raymond	36	Gascon Roles	
	Beryndes	1334	Raymond	36	Gascon Roles	
Chiberta	Lac de Chiberta	1863	Raymond	49		Lake
Courbois	Fausegui	1198	Raymond	53	Cartulary	Hamlet
Donzacq	Molendinum de Donzag	1246	Raymond	57	Cartulary	Mill, the Donzacq stream rose in Biarritz, passed through Anglet and Bayonne and then joined the Adour
	Lo moly appelé Donzac	1539	Raymond	57	Chapter	
Moulin d'Hausquette	Molin de Fausquete	1259	Raymond	76	Cartulary	Mill
	Moulin de Hausquete	1556	Raymond	57	Saint-Clare	
Hondritz	Underitz	1149	Raymond	78	Cartulary	Hamlet
	Honderiz	1198	Raymond	78	Cartulary	
	Honderiz	1255	Raymond	78	Cartulary	
Irumendy	Yrumendie	12th century	Raymond	83	Cartulary	Hamlet (destroyed)
	Irumendie	13th century	Raymond	83	Cartulary	
Lamothe	Lamothe	1863	Raymond	91		Fief
Lastourte	Lastourte	1863	Raymond	96		Redoubt
Lazaret	Lazaret	1863	Raymond	98		"dépôt de mendicité" (Poorhouse)
Mauléon	Mauléon	1863	Raymond	110		Château
Montori	Montori	1863	Raymond	117		Hamlet
Navariz	Le Fontaine de Navariz	1198	Raymond	121	Cartulary	Fountain at Montori
Le Pignada	Le Pinada	1863	Raymond	135		Forest
Pontots	Pontots	1863	Raymond	138		Hamlet
Refuge Notre-Dame	Le Refuge	1863	Raymond	141		Religious house
Sincos	Sincos	1149	Raymond	161	Cartulary	Hamlet (destroyed)
Sutar	Villa quæ dicitur Huzater	12th century	Raymond	165	Cartulary	Hamlet
	Utsatarren	1149	Raymond	165	Cartulary	
	Usatarren	1198	Raymond	165	Cartulary	
	Ussutarren	13th century	Raymond	165	Cartulary	
	Hucetarren	13th century	Raymond	165	Cartulary	
	Sustaren	16th century	Raymond	165	Cartulary	
	Sutarre	1863	Raymond	165		
Troissonat	Troissonat	1578	Raymond	168	Chapter	the name of a place at the mouth of the Adour, called le Boucau on 28 October 1578

Sources:

- Raymond: Topographic Dictionary of the Department of Basses-Pyrenees, 1863, on the page numbers indicated in the table. (in French)
- Orpustan: Jean-Baptiste Orpustan, New Basque Toponymy

Origins:

- Cartulary: Cartulary of Bayonne or Livre d'Or (Book of Gold)
- Collations: Collations of the Diocese of Bayonne
- Cassini: Cassini Map from 1750
- Chapter: Titles of the Chapter of Bayonne
- Saint-Claire: Titles of the Abbey of Sainte-Claire of Bayonne

== History ==
=== Prehistory ===
Based on discoveries made, the oldest land in Anglet dates back to prehistory (mid-Paleolithic) and Mousterian culture (from 100,000 to 35,000 BC). Various flint tools characteristic of the Mousterian period have been discovered. The use of splinters on both faces to make sharp points (scratcher, scraper) allows working on skins and making axes with wooden handles. Around Anglet, including the Tower of Lannes, Brindos, and Sutar, open air locations high above low swampy parts were preferred as in other parts of Basque Country (Saint-Pierre-d'Irube, Ilbarritz at Bidart, Duboscoa at Villefranque, Lahonce, Urt, and Bidache).

The prefecture of the Aquitaine region, considering the knowledge elements of the archaeological heritage of the commune currently identified in the archaeological database of the Regional Directorate of Cultural Affairs of Aquitaine issued an order for the following sites: Brindos, Cote 50, La Ballastière of Micoteau (Sutar), and Hondritz referenced as having Paleolithic occupation. The sites in the Rue du Colombier and the Tower of Lannes are referenced to as prehistoric sites of refuge which also refers to occupation in proto-historic times (Copper Age, Bronze Age, Iron Age).

=== Roman times ===
During the Roman era (towards 400 AD), Bayonne served as a castrum (in Novempopulania) for a cohort large enough for a rampart to be built (still visible in some places) surrounding an area somewhat excessive for an Army (seven hectares), but no remains indicate that there was a city (no theatre, no ruins of villas or baths, etc.). At that time, the regional Roman capital was "Aquae Augustae" (Dax) and the people living in the geographical area between Dax and Oiartzun (which included the commune of Anglet) called themselves Tarbelli. Furthermore, there is evidence that outside these walls, there were many potters who worked for the Roman cohort.

=== Middle Ages ===
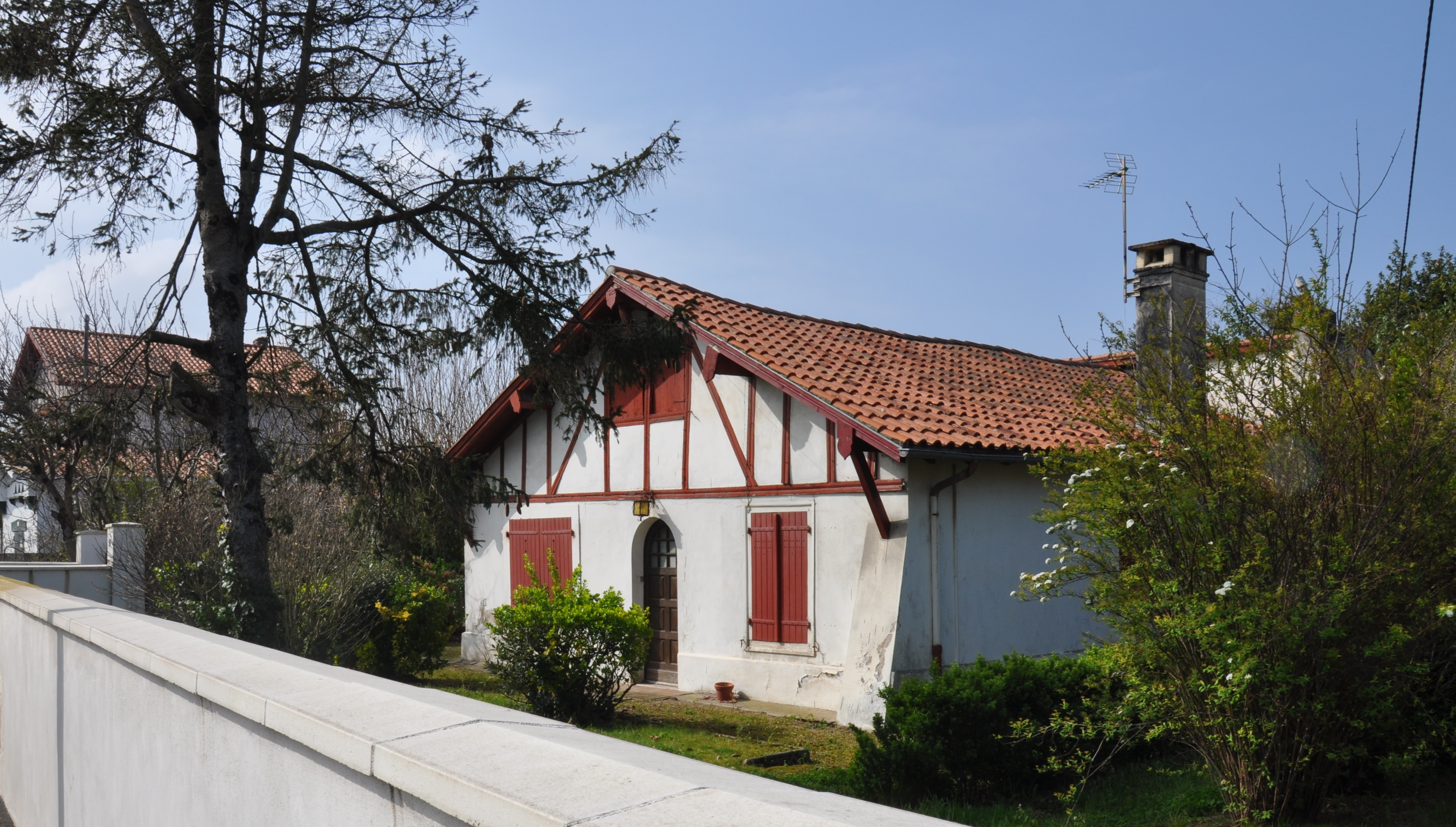
Old house in Anglet - as witness to the rural past and listed in the inventory of heritage for the city of Anglet (Annex PLU)

The history of Anglet actually appears from the Middle Ages where it was discovered that the core of the oldest settlement is located in a rural area called "Berindos" which is Brindos (mentioned in 1083). There are some remains of a mill, dating to the 12th century, which was used to grind corn (the Moulin de Brindos). Two grindstones for wheat and the mule barn are still present. It was also found that Berindos was a parish or at least included a church from the 12th century. This area is located south of the airport: its agricultural past has disappeared under residential urbanization and development.

The mill is now a ruin: saved from demolition in 2000 by a local association (Ardatza-Arroudet, Friends of the Mills of Basque and Béarn Country). A developer planned to replace it with a parking lot for a shopping area. Authorizations were granted at that time. However, what is probably one of the oldest (12th century) heritage buildings of the city remains although the house, as old as the mill, was destroyed in 1978. A fire destroyed part of the mill in 2011, creating a need for security in 2013.

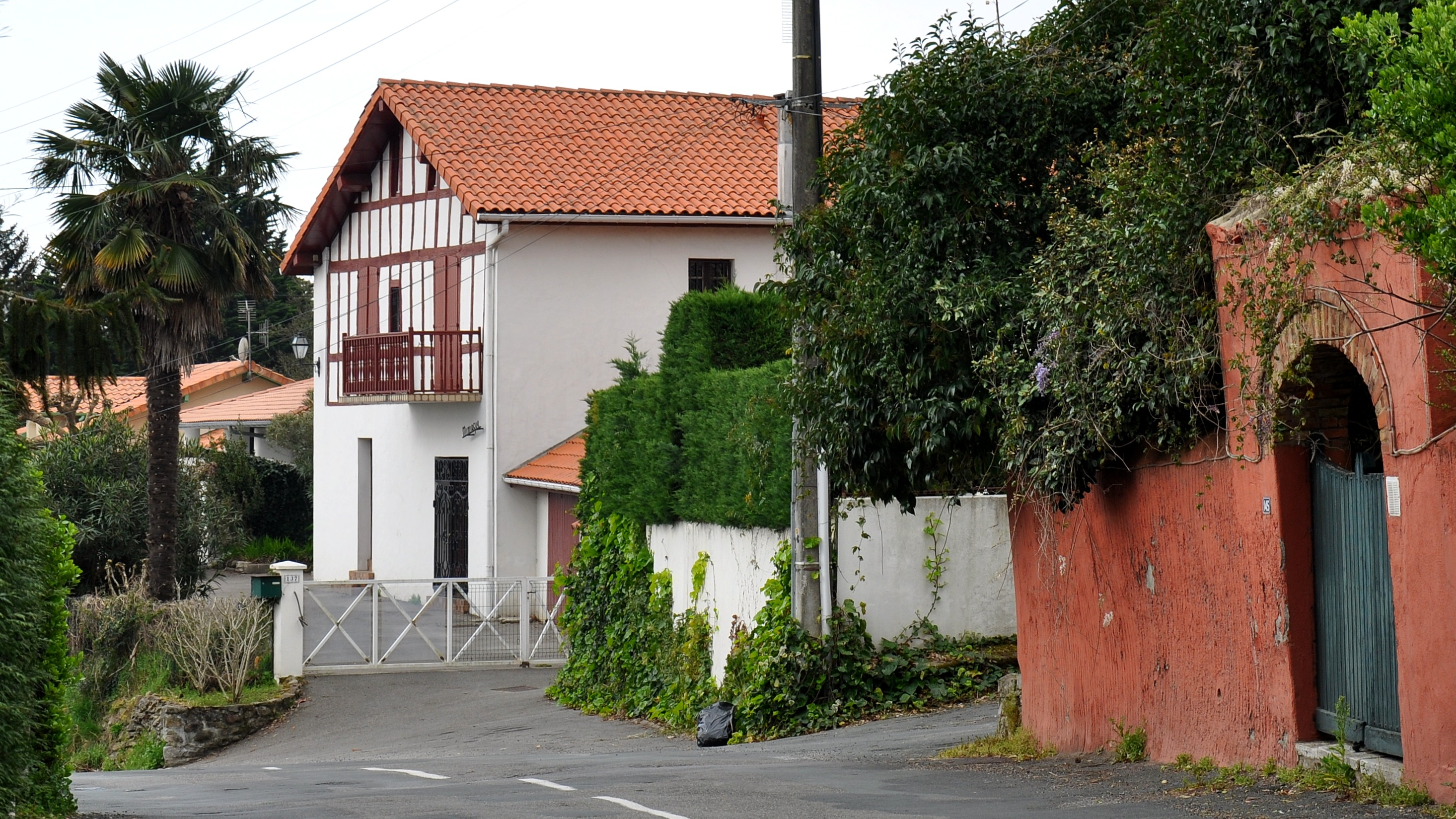
Mimiague Farm in labourdin timbered style. The ground floor was designed for living and stables, the first floor for hay drying and curing of hams - Rue de Bahinos Anglet

In the parish of Brindos there are ancient lordships and noble houses: the Domain of Urcos (1149) and the Terra de Sincos (1141). Other areas of population also appear in the Book of Gold of Bayonne namely:

- a farm at Sutar (1083 spelled Huzater),
- Places at Irandatz and Andotz (1149)
- Nalbais/Naubeis (1083),
- Fausegi (1198),
- Fondarraga

There are also references to orchards and mills at Mufale/Aumufale (on the Anglet border) and at Balaison/Balichon. In the current area of Pontots/Beyries there is also Dames de Montori (not Montaury), a religious order of Saint-Bernard d'Esteyron (no relation to the Bernardines of the nineteenth century) who established themselves on the Route de Biarritz. They later moved to the right bank (which was perhaps their original monastery) and were dependent on the Bishop of Dax and not of Bayonne.

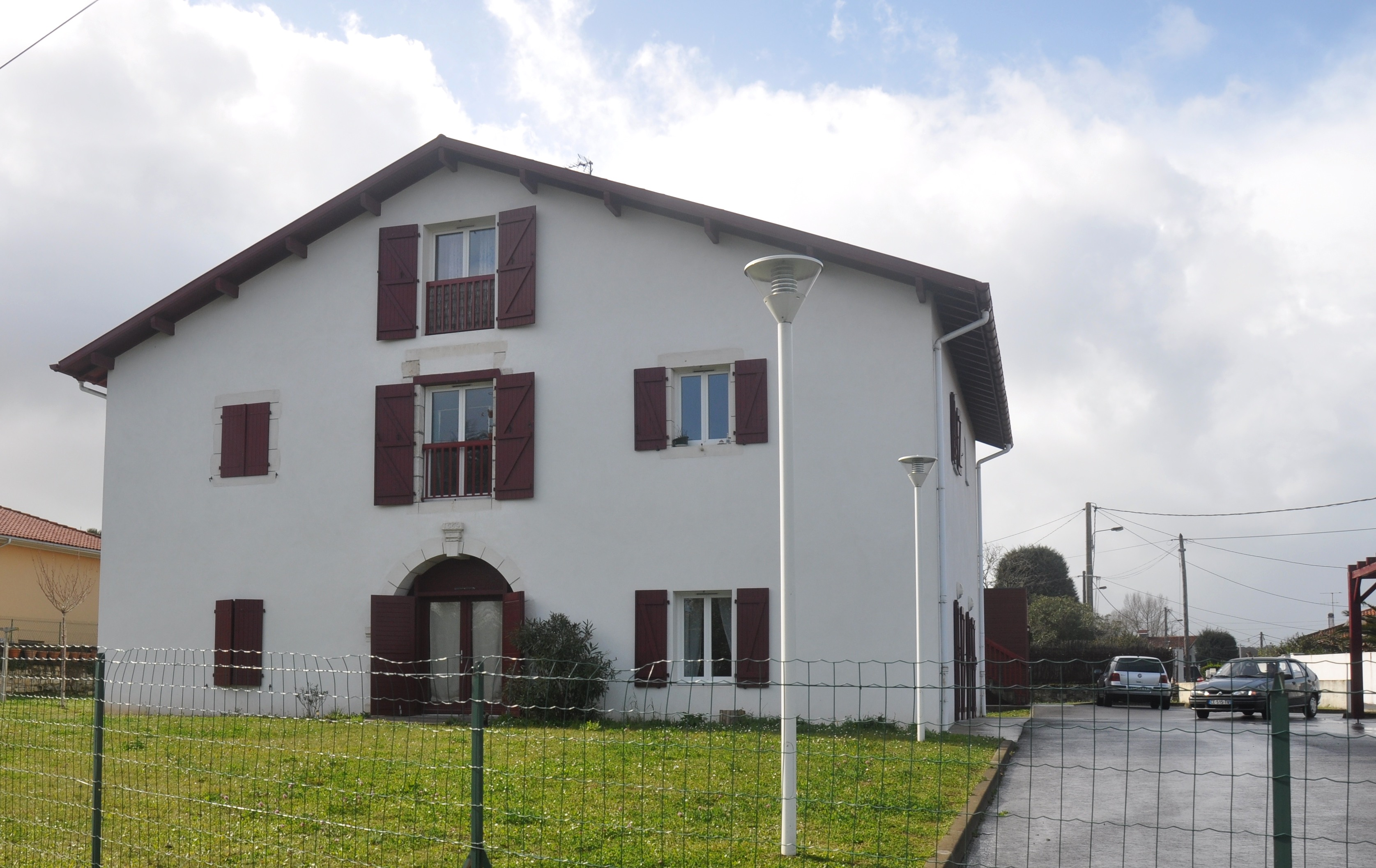
One of the oldest farms in Anglet, the Camiade farm (Rue de la Hausquette). The date 1669 is engraved on the pediment of stone. It features a carved lintel and a gabled façade with a gable roof

Anglet also had a port area, Fausquette/Hausquette, where resin, wine, cider (then called "pomade") and wheat (then called blat) were loaded. The Hausquette Mill cited in 1256 in the Book of Gold of Bayonne is located on the Maharin Stream near this port. The building is now a private house located at 181 rue de Hausquette still visible and referred to by the city as a "Route for walking and cycling - Streams and fountains - Discover the historic and natural heritage of Anglet".

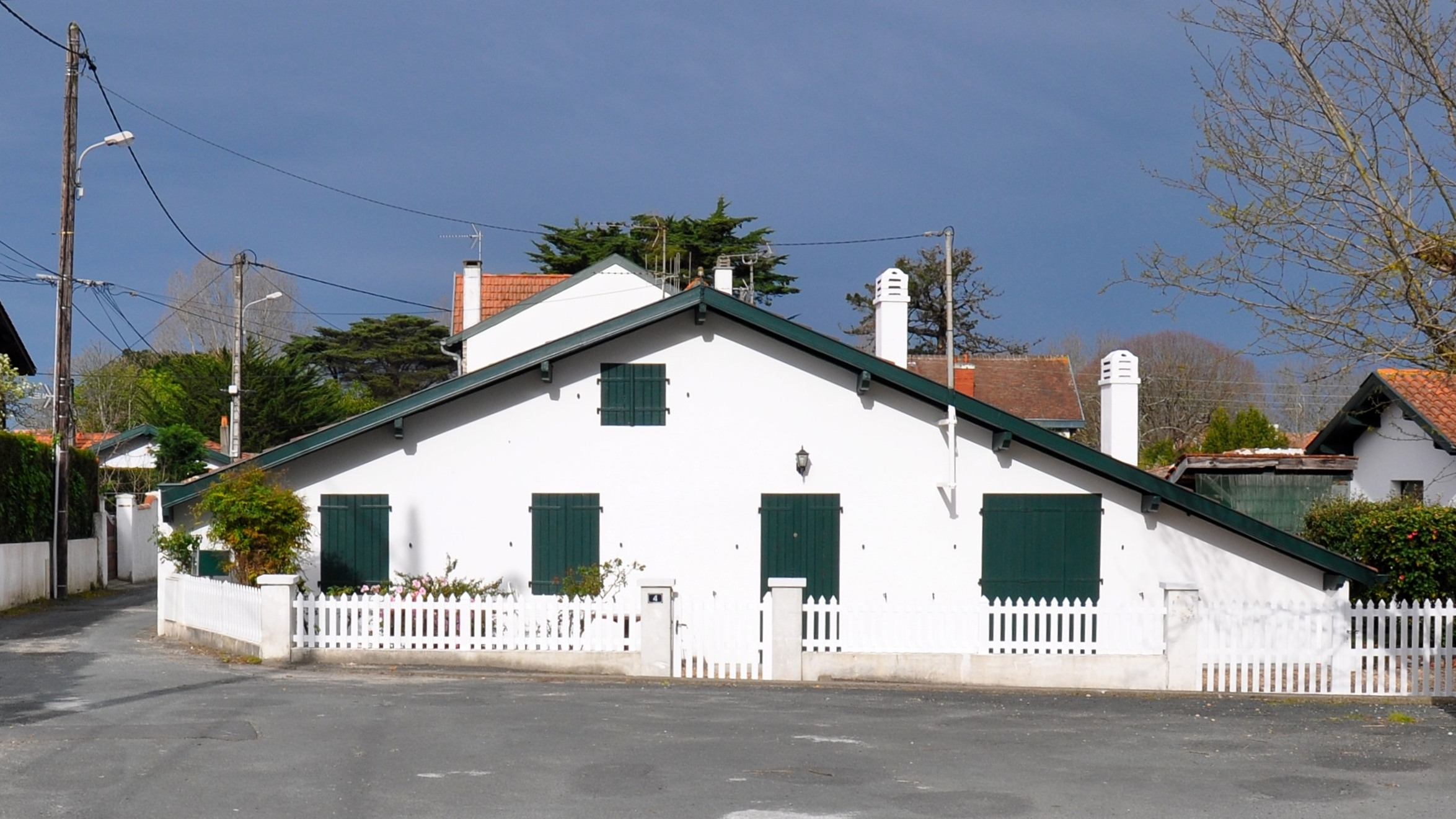
Bascot House - typical of an old Lande house, squat, on a rectangular base with or without a floor used to store hay

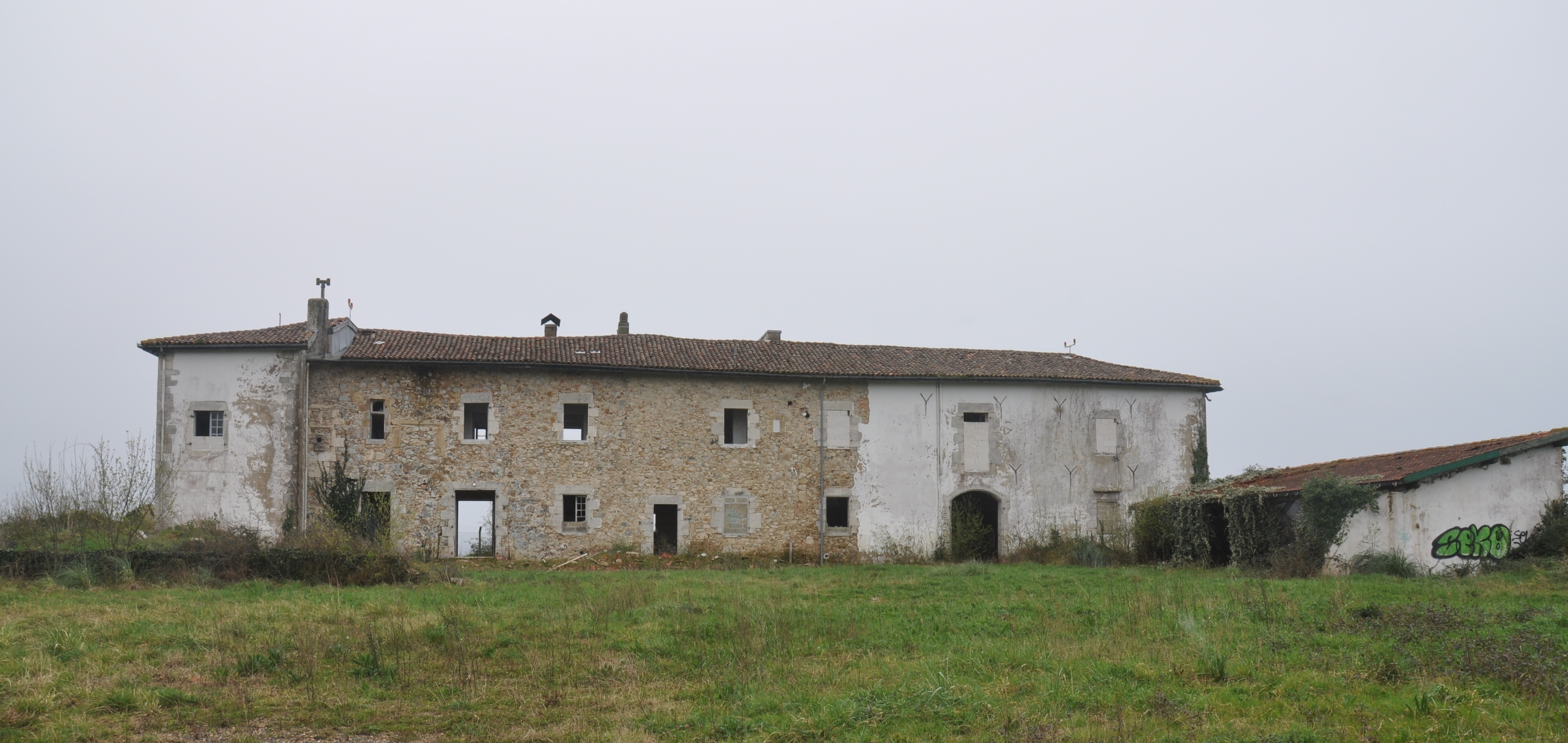
An old farm in Anglet called Mauleon but whose original name was "Bergouey Farm". Part of the building dates from the end of the 15th century and beginning of the 16th century.

In the Middle Ages, Bayonne was already a fortified city under English domination from the 12th to the 15th centuries. The population became more numerous and extended beyond the perimeter walls to settle in the suburbs surrounded by fields and vineyards where the suburb of Saint Léon was an extension from the gate of the same name. The chronicler Froissart stated that "the suburb (was) as important as the city". Saint Léon was organized around its church (Saint Léon) and extended to the "Port of Beyries" and "to the Arritzague Stream". The church dates back to 1089. Two parishes seem to have been identified: Saint Léon and Brindos. However, before the end of the 16th century, Bayonne was taken from the English by the Kingdom of France and the suburbs were demolished (Saint Léon, Marracq, and Beyris) as being too close and too prejudicial to the defence of the walled city, which concentrated within the confines of the existing small and large Bayonne (which explains the density and height of buildings in the centre of Bayonne). France was wary of Spain who tried several times to capture Bayonne (1523 and 1552).

In 1557, the Saint Léon church was demolished and transferred to its current location in 1564 in front of the current Hôtel de Ville (town hall) of Anglet. As Manex Goyhenetche points out in his book on Anglet, the city was then "the surrounding countryside of Bayonne", "densely populated rural suburb of peasants". It was more than a single entity, but a set of different districts including religious buildings (chapels) which have disappeared today. It was a large rural territory dominated by a topography of landforms (plateaus and terraces) and lower parts (Barthes and streams) covered various agricultural operations, woods, orchards, vineyards, and mills which lived on agriculture and cattle.

=== The rivalry between Anglet and Bayonne ===
Bayonne then had a monopoly on trade and fishing in the whole basin of the Adour from Biarritz to Capbreton. Bayonne tried to master the marshy strip of land that was once on the left bank of the river when the natural mouth of the Adour was much further north (located in the tenth century at Cape Breton then, after yet another quirk of the River, at Vieux Boucau from 1310 to 1578). The major event of this period was the diversion of the Adour. Trade in Bayonne declined due to the remoteness of the river mouth and especially the silting of the Adour that prevented large vessels enter the estuary. Louis de Foix, an engineer sent by the king, succeeded, after many efforts using local labour, in diverting the river to allow an exit for the Adour only five or six kilometres (3.1 or 3.7 miles) from Bayonne.

Rivalries and conflicts between Anglet and Bayonne continued for the jurisdiction and rights over this sandy strip of land that was now cut in half, with one part north of the Adour and not solely on the left bank of the river, which complicated the situation even more. A war of justification of the boundary marks and rights therefore intensified between the two cities to see who could enjoy the sands of Gauseirans where were identified as "Les Pignadas". The name of Gauseirans/Betenave would be resumed in Gibraltar and then "basquised" to Chimberta and Chiberta.

In the texts of the city of Bayonne, it says to maintain the rights to the land and demand the sand. Conversely, England on its side tried to justify the demarcation, especially those "north of the river", and showed grazing agreements from 1395 and 1525 before the diversion ("to Betenave, located in the vast space of Gauseirans containing the sand and pignadas attached "to the farm lands" of Anglet"). This did not deter the rivalry that continued throughout the 17th and 18th centuries and finally ended in settlement agreements.

=== 18th century ===
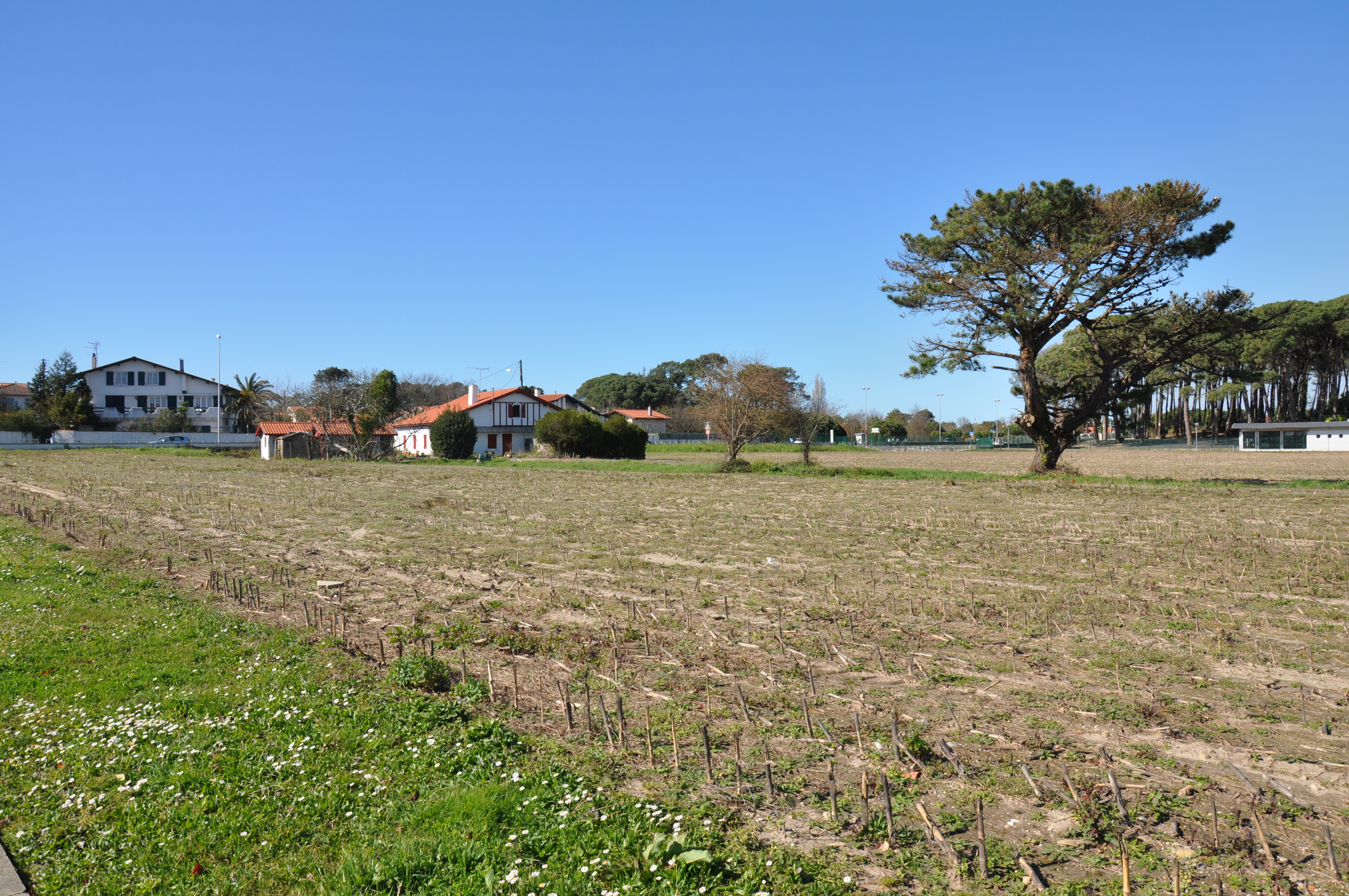
An old house surrounded by pine forests and fields

Besides the issue of communal boundaries, the rivalry was exacerbated by the antagonism of behaviour between the Bayonne bourgeoisie and the Anglet peasantry. At that time, the lords, nobles and bourgeois of Bayonne bought land at Anglet but fled from community measures and obligations (particularly in terms of taxation). Despite careful control of the people and the obstinacy of the peasants, some aristocrats from Bayonne won a fight which was not played on equal terms.

At that time, many of the inhabitants of Anglet were herdsmen who sought ox carts to bring fertilizer to their land from the stables of Bayonne. These oxen were used to transport goods between Bayonne, Saint Jean de Luz and Spain as well as to maintain their vineyards, corn, or wheat fields. In the pignadas, the resin or "gem" is harvested from pine trees for producing candles or to allow the caulking of ships as well as for making soap, perfume, and many household goods. Plastic and synthetic products would destroy his employment and his crop. There were also plantations of cork oak used for many purposes (corks but also very fashionable for planting in the 19th century).

During the Revolution and the Empire there was "a double movement of land grabbing and dilapidation of heritage" to convert land under cultivation at the expense of the old houses of Anglet who used communal land for their flocks. In 1812, an image of the town is provided by the Mayor of the time: "a population of 1965 souls (...) houses are distant from each other without any rallying point that the church (Saint Léon) provided". At Anglet, most of the people were small farmers although some wealthy Bayonne people settled in the commune such as the binder and lithographer Jean Bernain who bought "Quintau" in 1787.

The difficulties were compounded by the wars of the Revolution and the billeting of troops "at extraordinary and necessary expense occasioned by the cavalry (Napoleonic), the train of artillery, and the troops of the line" who stayed during their passage to the Spain. The same then occurred in 1814 by Wellington's British troops during the fighting that devastated the Blancpignon forest, then returning to Spain to face the routed Napoleonic army routed (who took refuge within the walls of Bayonne). Part of the population abandoned Anglet in 1813 and 1814 to escape to the north or south. In 1822 cholera struck Anglet.

In March 1815, during the disorders caused by the Hundred Days and after the Battle of Waterloo, a Spanish army commanded by the Earl of Labisbal made a brief foray beyond the Bidassoa to Anglet and Ustaritz. These troops made a fighting retreat after an intervention by Louis Antoine, Duke of Angoulême, with the Spanish monarch Ferdinand VII.

=== 19th century, the transformation of Anglet, a rural area in an urban space ===
In 1838–1839, Father Cestac acquired the property Châteauneuf to install the institution of Our Lady of refuge and create a community of servants of Mary away from the city and the critics (they collected young prostitutes wishing to exit). This property now has the last agricultural land between Chiberta forest and the Boulevard BAB. Father Cestac did not have much money which forced him to work the land with his community who were unaccustomed to working the land. The nuns founded a school, cultivated and cleared most of the land surrounding the Refuge, which grew considerably. Beyond the corn fields, near the forest, there are greenhouses where they still maintain today decorative flowers and gardens (on the other side of the Avenue de Montbrun). Some of them wanted to go further in their work of prayer and meditation, namely absolute silence. These were the Bernardines who settled in the area about a kilometre from the Refuge near the greenhouses. Next to the Bernardine convent is the cemetery for Bernardines and the Servants of Mary with more than 300 graves in sand - all symmetrically aligned and decorated with a shell cross. This site is unique in France. Each year, they are rebuilt during the season of Lent because the weather erodes them. Nearby there is also a chapel of straw with a sand floor (Our Lady of Solitude), symbol of the greatest austerity of their religious faith.

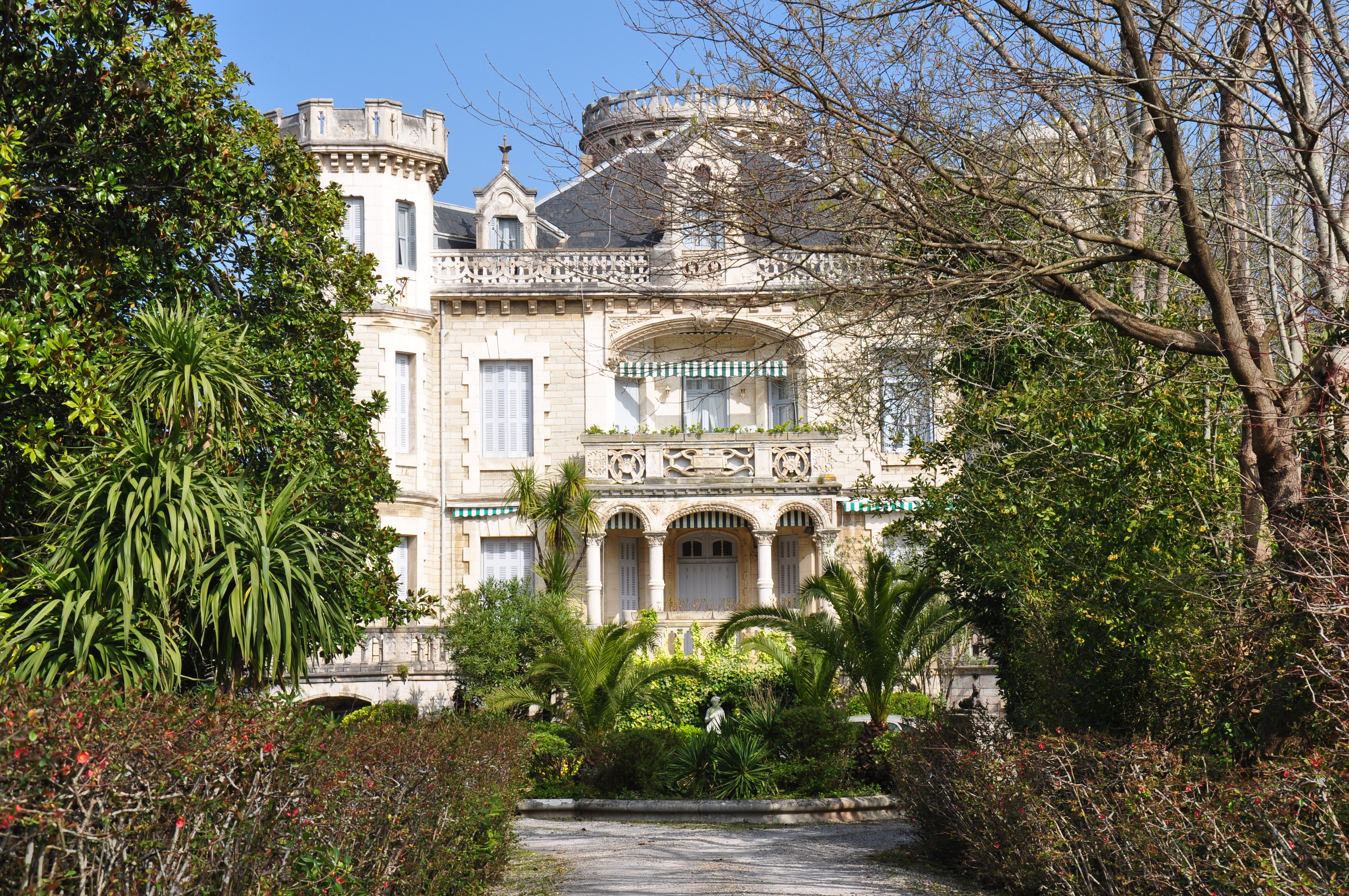
VVilla Sofia, inhabited by Princess Yourievsky, wife of Tsar Alexander II of Russia

Early in 1870 it was decided to build a racetrack on the sands of Chiberta to develop a new area of recreation and tourism on the current site of La Barre like its neighbour biarrot. This racecourse included fifty hectares of land previously used for the cultivation of vines and some market gardening, while crystallizing a divide between tourism development then reserved for the elite and the peasants, still rooted in the rural world. Its creation was due to a cousin of the mayor of Bayonne, Felix Labat, supported by an Englishman, Lord Howden, a former Spanish ambassador and owner of the Château de Caradoc in Bayonne. The racecourse and shopping places became the most fashionable distraction on the Basque coast. This was the rendezvous of all the "elite" of the time who came to show themselves in the elegant galleries.

In 1877 the BAB (Bayonne Anglet Biarritz) railway line of "American railway" (steam tram) type was inaugurated. It served Anglet through the "Five Cantons" halt near the Villa Marie Antoinette. However, it was critical that the new railway crossed rural roads in the commune by unmanned level crossings (causing many accidents) while avoiding the administrative centre of Saint John. The concern was not to serve the people of Anglet but to link Bayonne to Biarritz.

It was not until 1888 that a new line (BLB) connected Bayonne to Biarritz along the National Route N10 and strengthened the intersection located in the Saint John district. BLB quickly became more attractive than the BAB, especially because of its coverage of Saint John - the administrative district - and the Marracq High School stop in Bayonne where many students were enrolled from Anglet.

In 1884–1885, the first bathing establishment opened its doors on the House of Love beach wishing to compete with the baths in Biarritz. Swimmers had at their disposal: seventy-five cabins, a wide assortment of bathing suits, and a swimming coach who personally watched over them.

On 9 January 1924 the town was hit by a "tsunami" that destroyed the racetrack (it never succeeded in recovering from this disaster). The bathing establishment, also hit hard, was rebuilt 30 metres (98 feet) away.

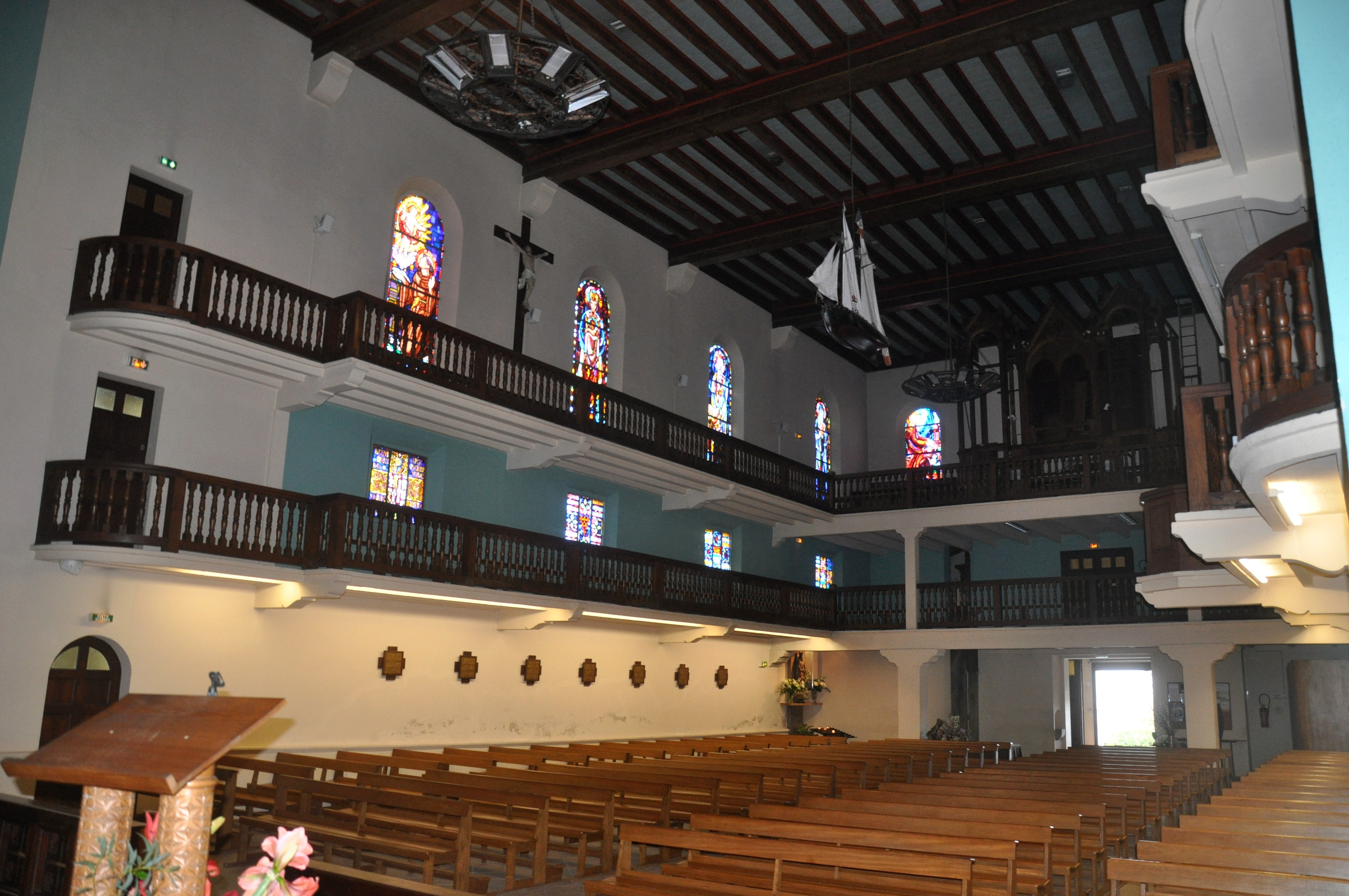
The interior of the Church of Saint Mary in the 5 cantons district built in 1933

It was not until the mid-1920s that the company BALF (Biarritz-Anglet-Forest) acquired 150 new hectares to create the Chiberta Golf Course (1927). In 1928 a second bathhouse was created at the House of Love, with a saltwater pool, a dozen "cabanas" (cabins with private bathrooms), and a large hall (the whole occupies 15,000 m2). Its art deco style is signed Anatole Durruty. This property attracted the biggest names in high society of the time (the Baroness de Rothschild, the Maharajah of Jasdan, the Grand Duke Dimitri, the King and Queen of Spain, the Prince of Wales, Buster Keaton etc.) and caused a real buzz for the performances, sporting events, galas and world exhibitions. This was the golden age of Anglet.

In 1929, the city was classified as a "resort". The three cities, Bayonne, Anglet, and Biarritz agreed to the creation of an airport offering international services which was located two-thirds in the commune of Anglet.

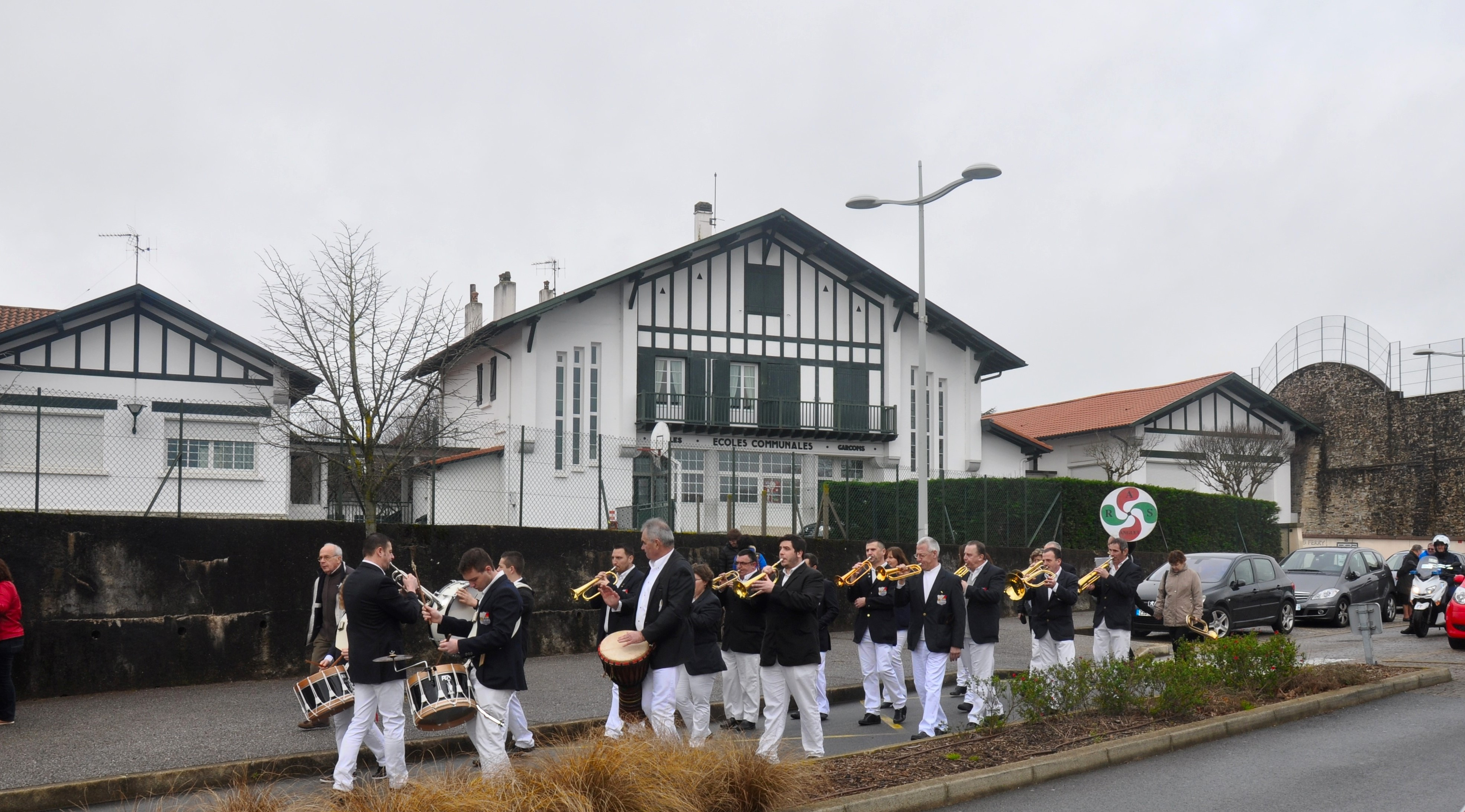
The Jules Ferry School at Anglet. In the foreground the school was built in neo-Basque style with additions on both sides with openings that reveal a more contemporary architecture. At the right is the rear side of the pediment, today in the courtyard of the school. Made of Bidache stone, it dates from 1899 and Chiquito de Cambo played there.

The VFDM railway line (Voies Ferrées Départementales du Midi) which links Bayonne to Hendaye via la Barre was built from 1913 to 1927 [ref. desired]. Traversing the woods and countryside Chiberta and overlooking the beaches of the House of Love, the "coast tram" quickly became a tourist line and was also popular with families and local residents. The line closed in 1948 due to a growing disaffection related to the crisis of the 1930s.

The chapel of the House of Love, created by Napoleon III became obsolete. Father Sabes was able to mobilize funds from High Society parishioners which allowed him to build a new church, Saint Mary's, in 1932 which became a listed church in 2014 - the first historical monument in Anglet.

=== Post-Second World War: continuing urbanization ===
Postwar, urbanization continued because of the space available and attractive prices, unlike Bayonne or Biarritz. From 1970 to 1980 Anglet absorbed 70% of subdivision projects in the metropolitan area against 10% for Biarritz. The "thirty glorious years" spared no area of the commune, when only a few years past it had farmland, parks, ancient marshes (object of fervour a few centuries earlier). There were real estate programs of all kinds (subdivisions, condominium buildings, shops, industries, business area, highways, 2x2, etc.). Even areas reserved for high society changed in the democratization of holidays and mass tourism. The rural past of the town was relegated to memory.

During the 1960s and 70s, the pool of prestigious bathing establishments underwent violent storms that damaged them and eventually lead to their demolition in 1977. The pier was consolidated and the building became a community centre. Today the buildings have been renovated and renamed Space Ocean.

Urban planning was done without a large-scale organizational plan, torn between two neighbouring communes. It was not until 1972 that the agglomeration created a first instance of intercommunal dialogue and today the urban community of Côte Basque-Adour (CAFB).

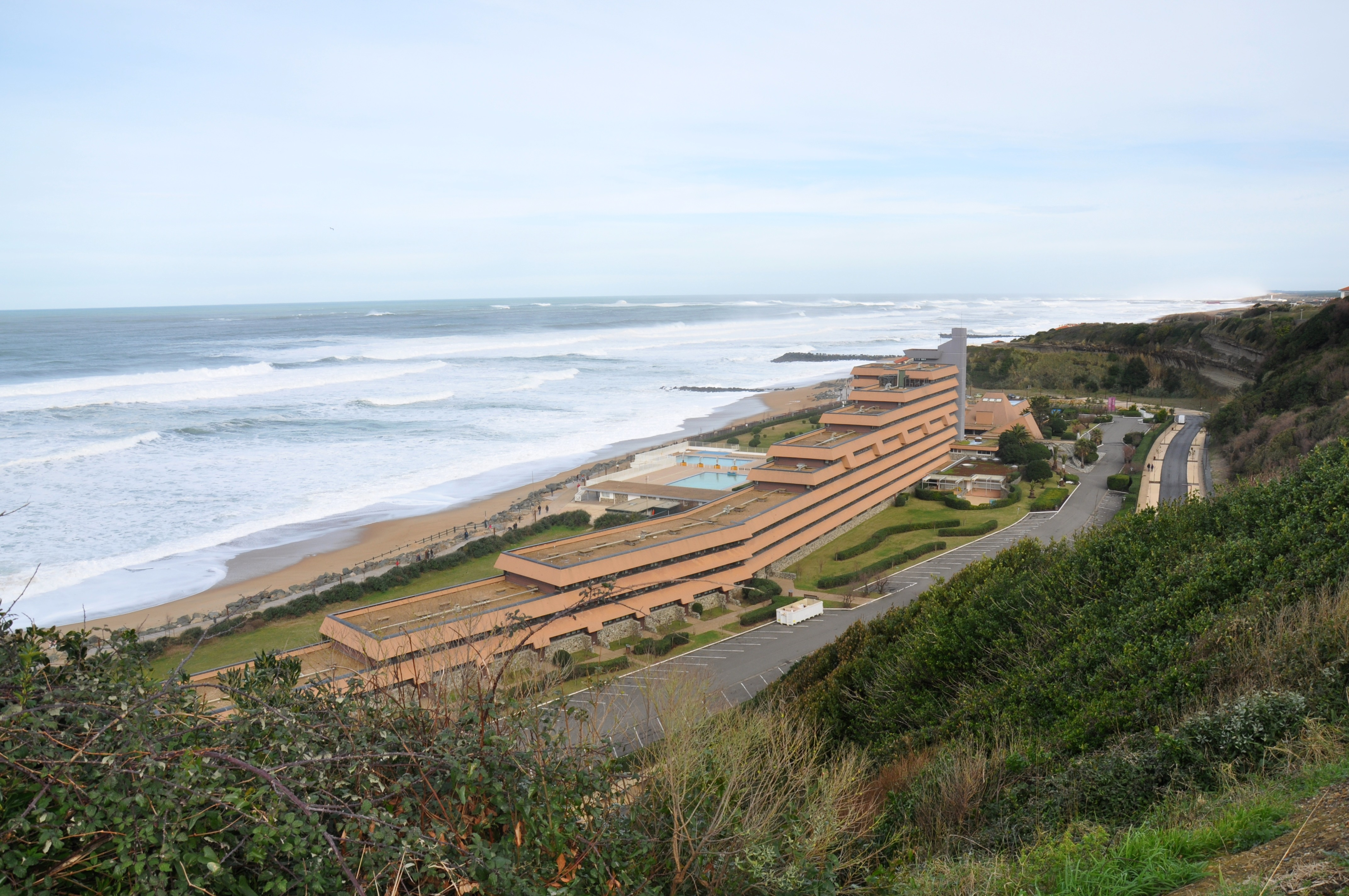
A characteristic image of the time, urbanization and the famous tourist site of Chambre d'Amour by Hotel VVF-1970

=== Heraldry ===
Arms of Anglet	The Gascon motto for Anglet is Mar e pinhader per m'ajudar which means "Sea and Forest will help me" (pinhader in Gascon is a forest of marine pines which are shown on the arms) Blazon: Argent, three pines in Vert posed in pale issuant from waves of Argent and Azure in base, in chief Gules charged with a lion passant gardant in Or holding a spear in his paw.

== Administration ==
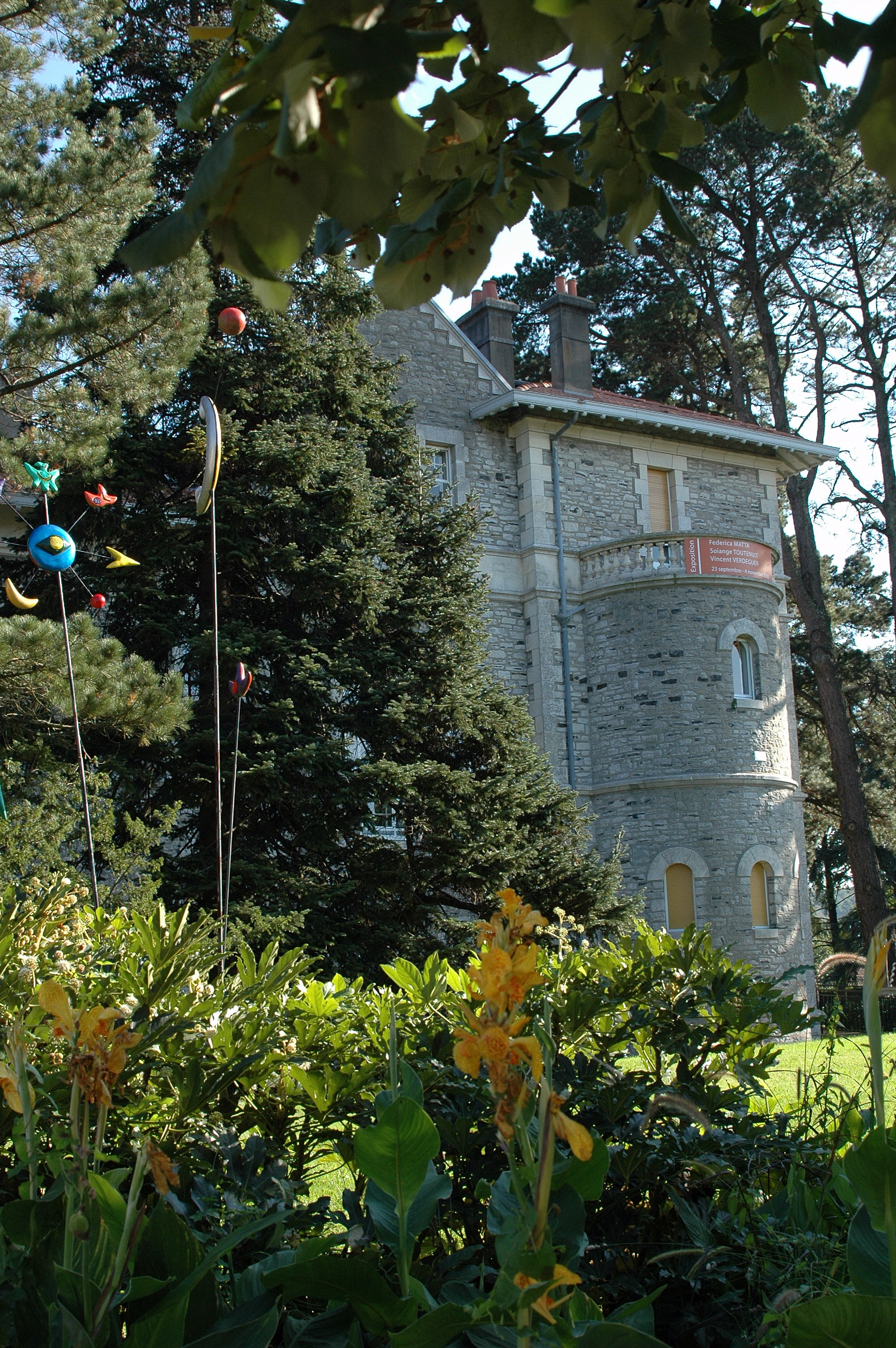
The Villa Béatrix Enea, head office of cultural affairs and the Twinning committee

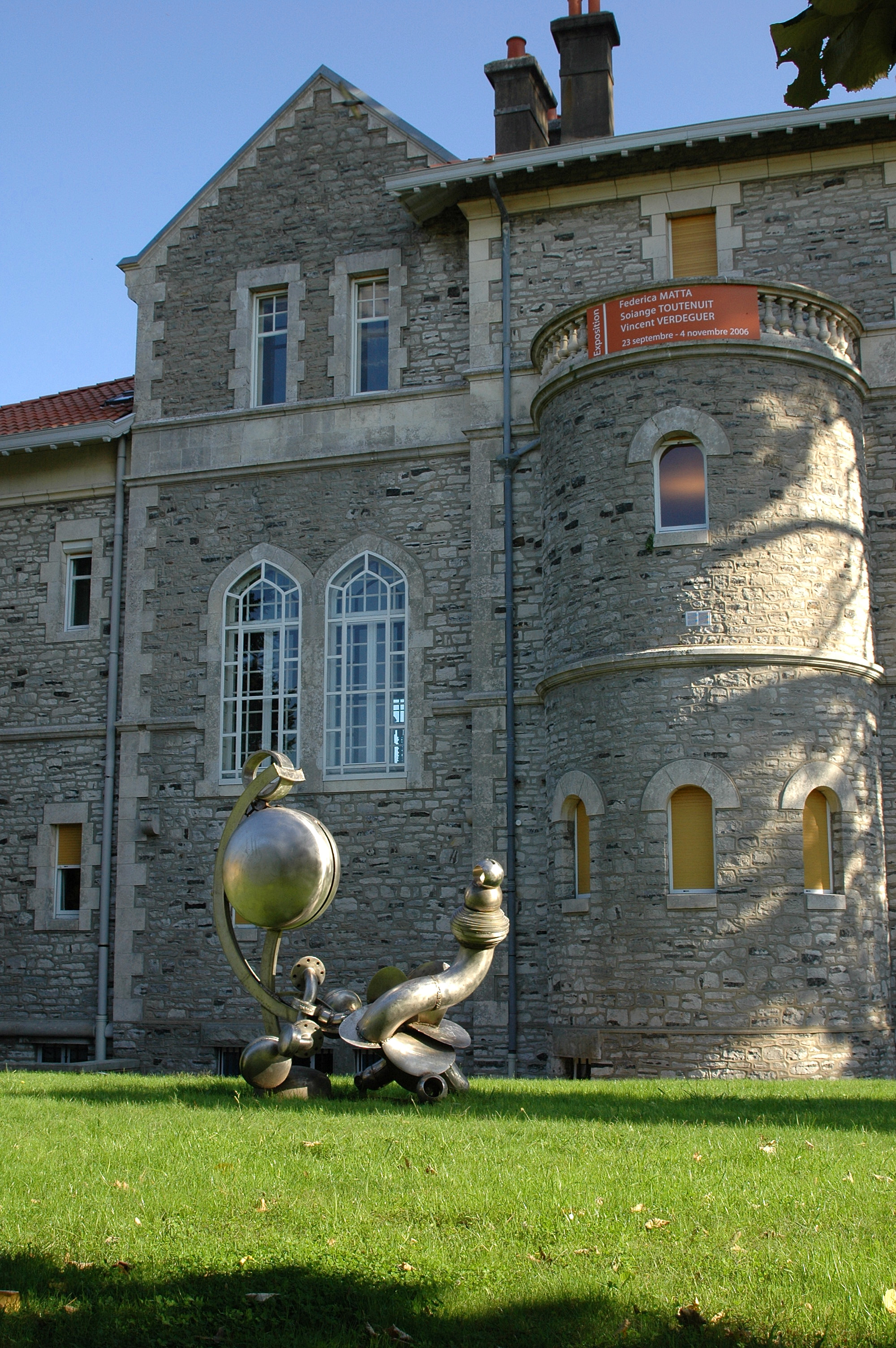
Sculpture in the public gardens in front of the Villa Béatrix Enea

Anglet town is the seat of the canton of Anglet, which covers part of the commune.

List of Successive Mayors

From	To	Name	Party	Position
1870	1897	Eugène Bernain		
1897		Albert Le Barillier		
1935	1937	Daubin		Doctor
1937	1941	François Dommain	Radical	
1971	1993	Victor Mendiboure	UDF	
1993	1999	Michel Bonnet	UDF	
1999	2001	Alain Lamassoure	UDF	Vice President of the UDF; Advisor to the Court of Auditors
2001	2008	Robert Villenave	UDF; PS	Vice-president of CABAB; Vice-president of Côte Basque-Adour agglomeration
2008	2014	Jean Espilondo	PS	
2014	2026	Claude Olive	UMP	General Councillor for Anglet-Nord Canton

=== Inter-communality ===
The town is part of six intercommunal structures:

- the Communauté d'agglomération du Pays Basque;
- the public agency for local management;
- the inter-communal association for management of the Txakurrak centre;
- the association to support Basque culture;
- the Joint association for the usage of the Nive;
- the energy association for Pyrénées-Atlantiques.

It is also a member of the Eurocity Basque Bayonne - San Sebastian.

== Twin town – sister city ==
Anglet is twinned with:

- Ansbach, Germany (1968)

== Demography ==
The inhabitants of the commune are known as Angloys or Angloyes in French, and as Angeluar in Basque.

Historical population

Year	Pop.	±% p.a.
1793	1,748	—
1800	1,811	+0.51%
1806	1,984	+1.53%
1821	2,213	+0.73%
1831	2,588	+1.58%
1836	2,944	+2.61%
1841	3,016	+0.48%
1846	3,312	+1.89%
1851	3,223	−0.54%
1856	3,350	+0.78%
1861	3,605	+1.48%
1866	3,780	+0.95%
1872	3,886	+0.46%
1876	4,116	+1.45%
1881	4,425	+1.46%
1886	4,839	+1.80%
1891	5,115	+1.12%
1896	5,382	+1.02%
1901	5,679	+1.08%

Year	Pop.	±% p.a.
1906	5,694	+0.05%
1911	6,627	+3.08%
1921	6,833	+0.31%
1926	8,233	+3.80%
1931	11,467	+6.85%
1936	11,320	−0.26%
1946	11,601	+0.25%
1954	12,603	+1.04%
1962	16,150	+3.15%
1968	21,190	+4.63%
1975	25,245	+2.53%
1982	29,821	+2.41%
1990	33,041	+1.29%
1999	35,263	+0.73%
2007	37,934	+0.92%
2012	39,223	+0.67%
2017	38,929	−0.15%
2023	43,271	+1.78%

Source: EHESS and INSEE

== Economy ==
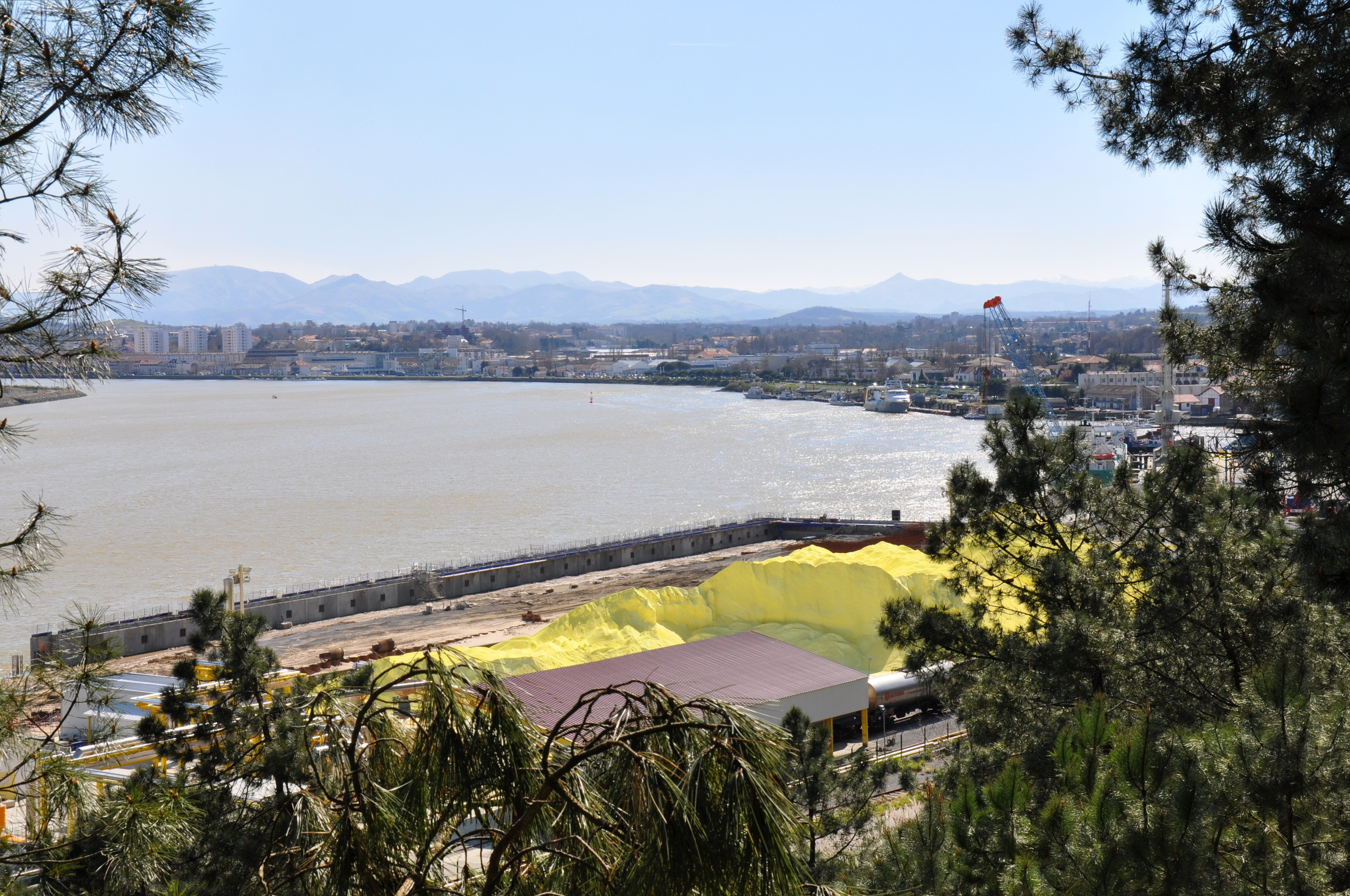
View from the Lazaret Forest: in the foreground, the stock of sulphur from Sobegi for the terminal at the Port of Bayonne, but located in the commune of Anglet

Once oriented towards agriculture (the town is part of the Appellation d'origine contrôlée (AOC) zone designation of Ossau-iraty) and in particular vegetable crops, Anglet now has, thanks to its location within the Bayonne-Anglet-Biarritz urban area, a broader economic scope.

Anglet is associated with the cities of Bayonne and Biarritz with which it shares the administration of the Biarritz – Anglet – Bayonne Airport.

Anglet is included in the control of the Port of Bayonne which also covers the communes of Bayonne and Boucau in the Pyrénées-Atlantiques and Tarnos in Landes.

Among local economic activities there are seaside tourism, Thalassotherapy, sports (surfing and water-slides) and aerospace (Dassault Aviation).

The commune also hosts agri-food sector enterprises who are among the top fifty largest in the department:

- the Bayonnaise Des Viandes (meat production);
- SAS TDA (production and preserving of meat);
- Mandion SA (industrial production of fresh bread and pastry);
- the Société d'abattage du Pays basque (Abattoir Company of Basque Country) (production and preserving of meat);
- SARL Sonath (production of bakery products).
- BAB2 is a shopping centre located in Anglet, with a Carrefour hypermarket of 13,000 m2 surrounded by some 90 smaller shops. The Carrefour hypermarket is the largest hypermarket in Pyrénées-Atlantiques and the third largest in Aquitaine based on turnover. The magazine Surf Session is based in Anglet.

== Culture and heritage ==
Winds and Tides was a lively review of poetry in Anglet which was organised by Jeanne Monteil and Jean-Léopold Dumontier-Béroulet from 1976 to 1992.

=== Languages ===
Anglet and the neighbouring communes of Biarritz and Bayonne can be seen at different times and through different points of view as either Gascon or Basque. The majority of people in this area spoke Gascon according to the Linguistic Atlas of Gascony (ALG) (1954-1966) and investigations on the limits of the Basque language by Lucien Bonaparte in 1863. At the same time some areas could be described as Basque (no doubt as a result of Basque campaigns in surrounding areas). Since the 20th century the French language has been the majority language.

=== Civil heritage ===
The commune has several buildings that are registered as historical monuments:

- The Hôtel de Ville (town hall) (1935). The town hall has two remarkable pieces of furniture:
  - A Buffet by Christian Ortet (1937)
  - A Table by Christian Ortet and Jean Lesquibe (1937)
- The Villa Arguia (1927)
- The Villa El Hogar (1924)
- The Villa Gomez, a former building for bridges and roads, has an item that is registered as a historical object:
  - a Writing desk and Armchair (1938)

Paul Campagne (1870-1941) and his wife Julienne Moussempès (1879-1956) were owners of the famous Hotel de l'Angleterre in Biarritz and in 1900 built a second home called "Marnoger" whose name comes from the names of their three children Marcel (1901-1918), Nora (1902-1956) and Roger (1905-1945) based on plans by architect Raymond Larrebat Tudor (1859-1943). This sumptuous house and its park renamed "Beatrix Enea" are part of the municipal heritage of Anglet which was acquired in 1985: the municipal city services are housed there.

=== Architectural Heritage ===
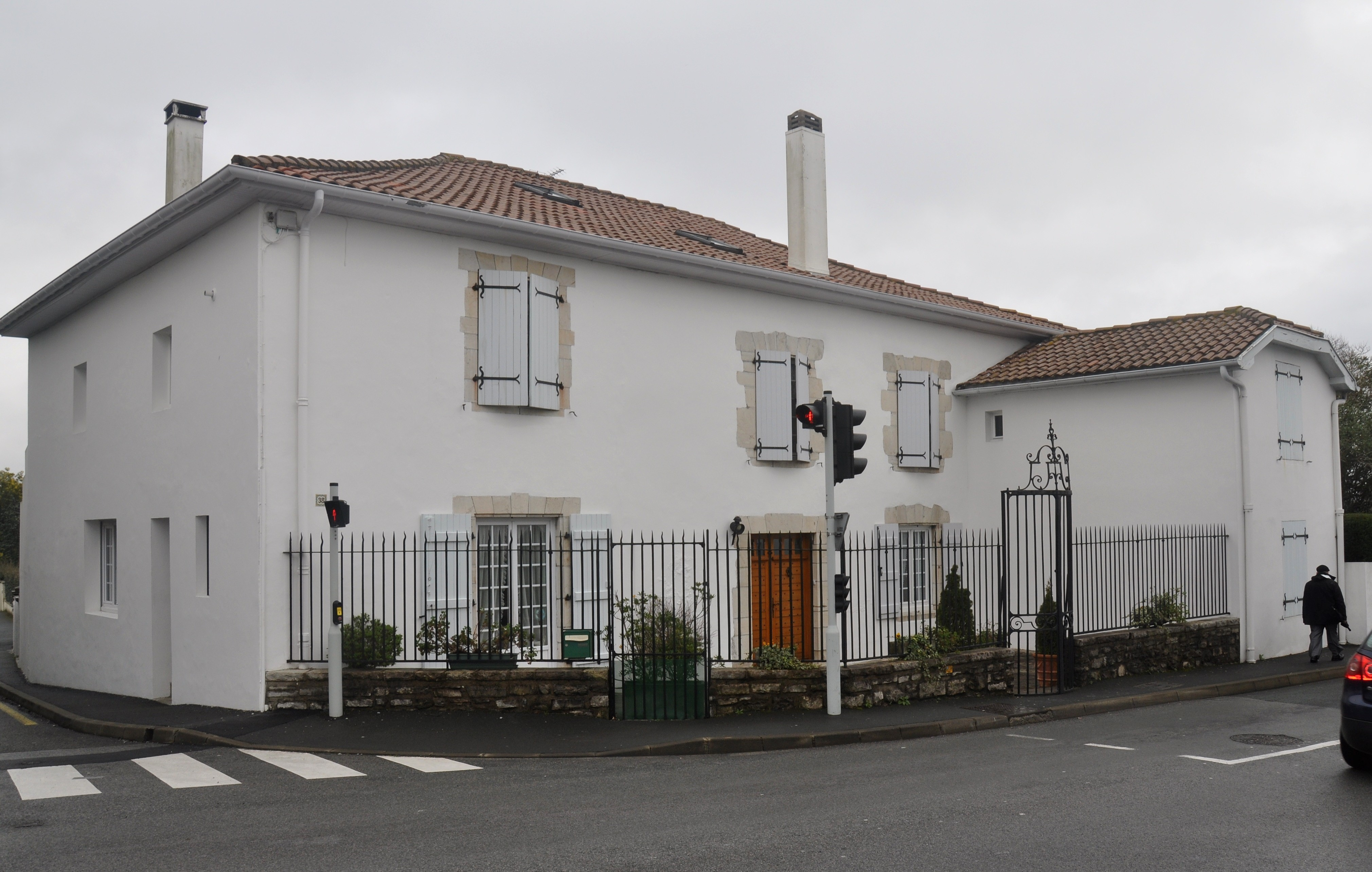
Very old Anglet house called Maison Bearnes cited in ancient writings (1600)

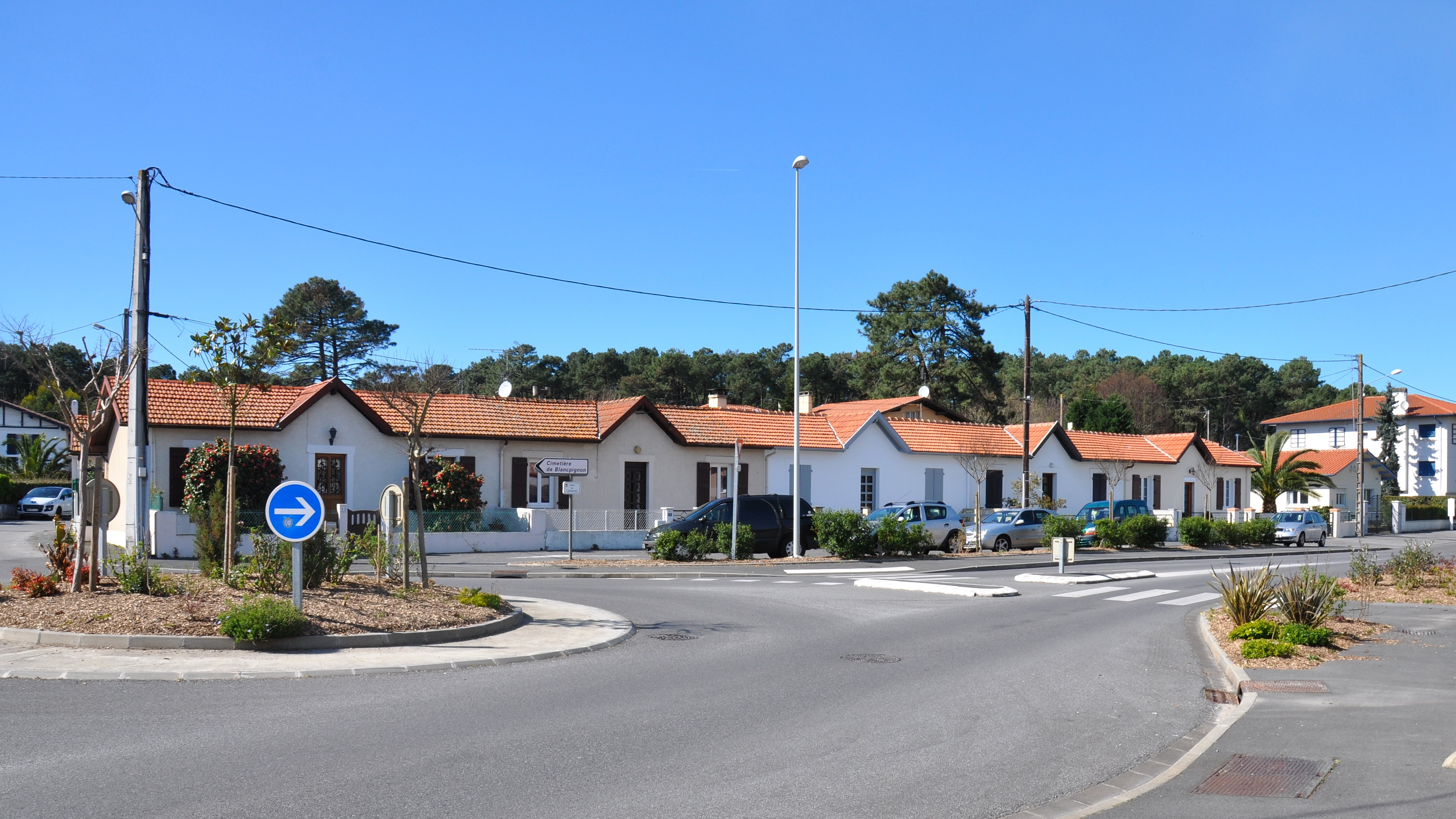
Blanc-Pignon district - an example of popular architecture in Anglet

During the urbanization of the late 19th and early 20th century architecture in Anglet was dominated by a model which took as a reference a Labourd farm, typical of the Basque Country, modelled from Villa Arnaga to Cambo-les-Bains. This model was called Néobasque. This movement was very popular at the beginning of the 20th century. Another type of architecture, the "chalet" for permanent and popular housing in a commune where the population increased sharply and lost its original rural character. Its purpose was residential and had no connection with what was later called the vacation home.

The vacation home is found along the coast, between the Biarritz golf course and Anglet near Chiberta and Chambre d'Amour. These vacation homes had an architectural style called eclecticism. There is no model and each house is influenced by and mixes various styles. Some houses are Moorish style, some are Mediterranean, others Norman-style English, and some are unclassifiable. Neo-Basque challenged this style of architecture.

Around 1930, in the works of the Gomez brothers and architect William Marcel (see the works in the Paulmy Alleys in Bayonne), the model evolved into the "casa torre" which is typical of the neighbouring provinces of Navarre and of Gipuzkoa. The El Hogar home was of this style and was a milestone in the architecture of the time. The house was made for an old Béarn native who made his fortune in Chile and so had a high sensitivity to Hispanic architecture which inspired its architect. William Marcel also designed the new Hôtel de Ville (town hall) in Anglet in the "New Spanish" style where (1935) is clearly displayed. In 1950, the labourdine neo-Basque-type house still remains as the predominant model and reference for appreciating a building well integrated into its environment.

=== Religious heritage ===
The city has seven churches: Saint-Michel, Holy Trinity, Saint-Léon, Saint-Bernadette, Our Lady of Refuge, Saint-Joseph, and Saint-Marie.

One wall of the former Dominican monastery of Couillioure was classified as an historic monument in 1928.

The Church of Notre-Dame-du-Refuge of the Congregation of the Servants of Mary contains one item that is registered as an historical object:

- Painting with frame: Father Cestac

There is also a worship hall for Mormons and a Kingdom Hall for Jehovah's Witnesses in the commune.

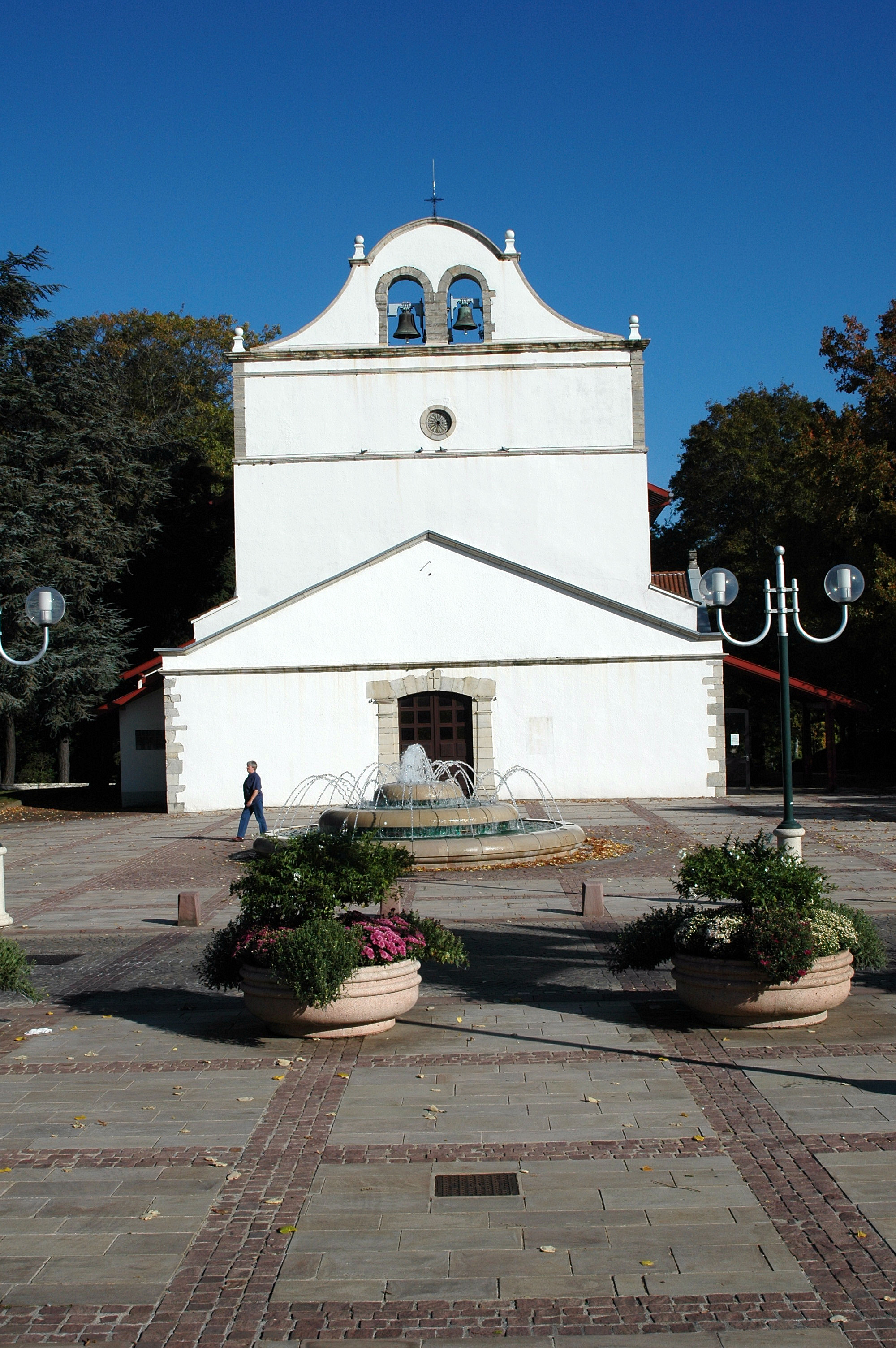
The church of Saint-Léon

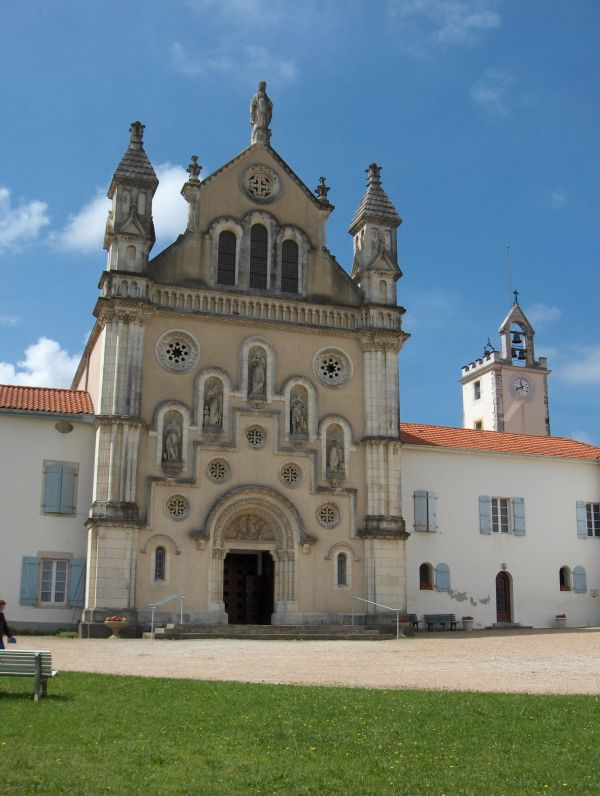
Facade of the Chapel of Our Lady of Refuge

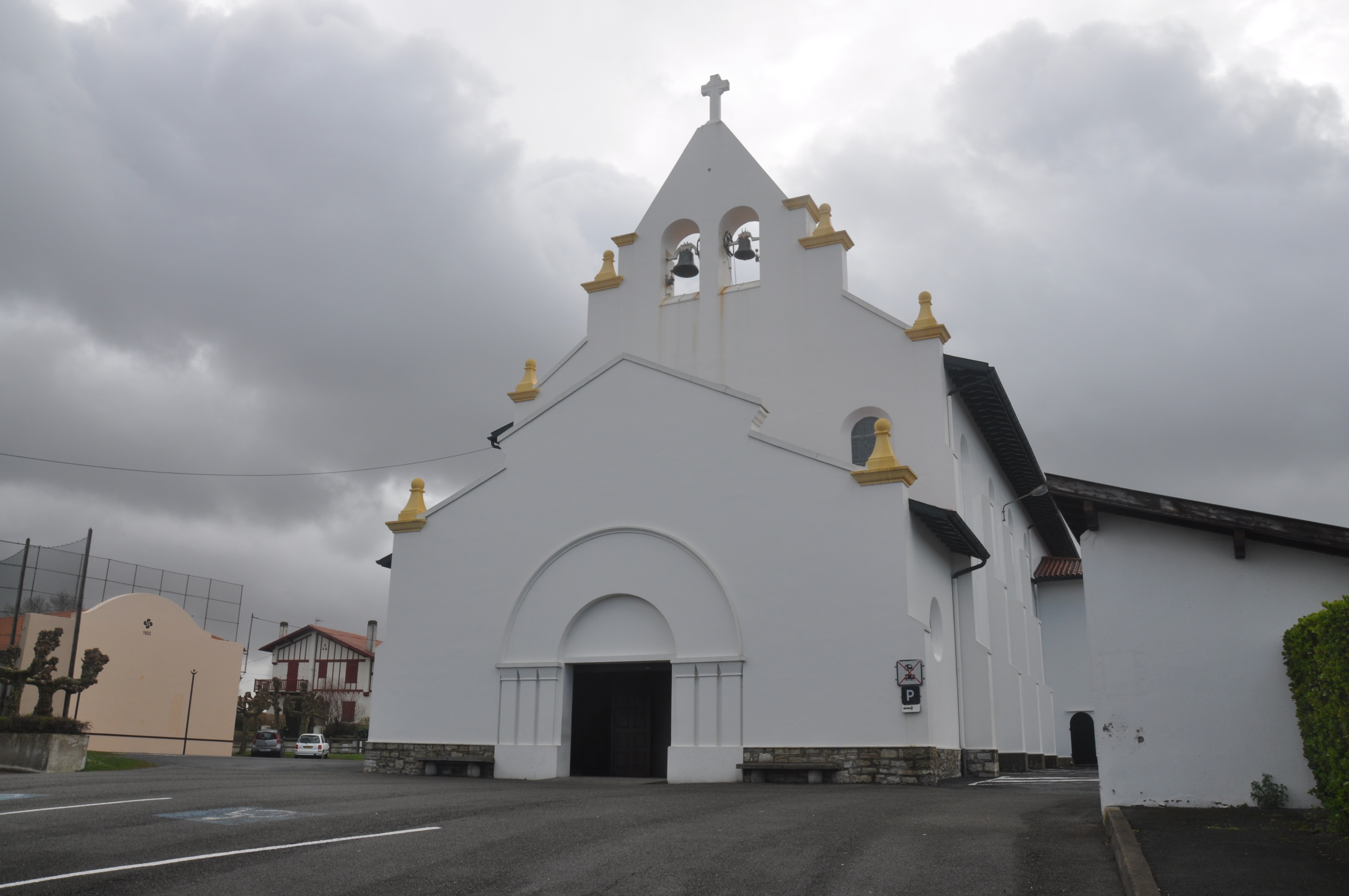
Church Saint Mary (5 Cantons) - classified as a historical monument

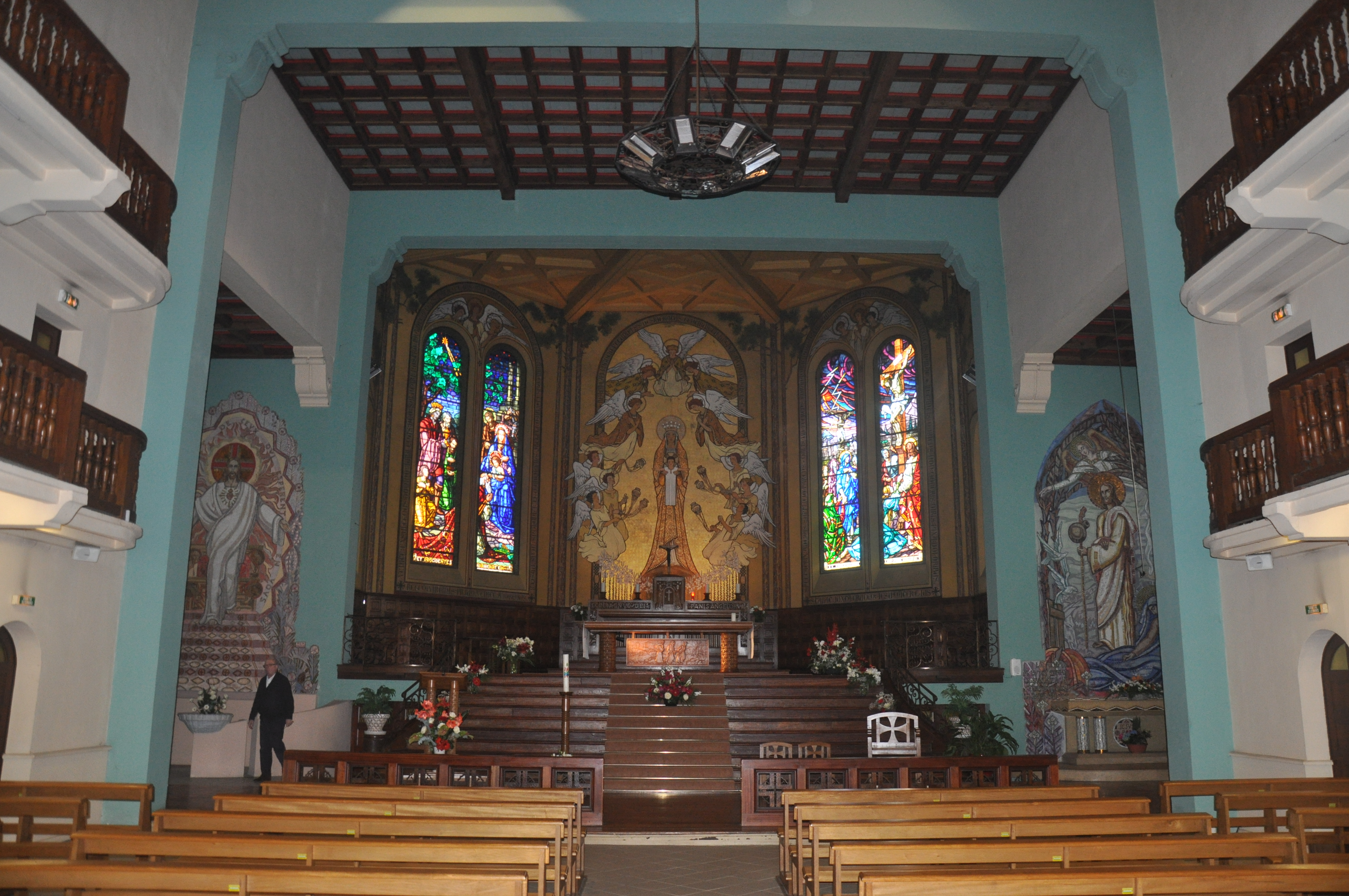
Church Saint Mary interior - of Basque inspiration but in art-deco style

=== Environmental heritage ===
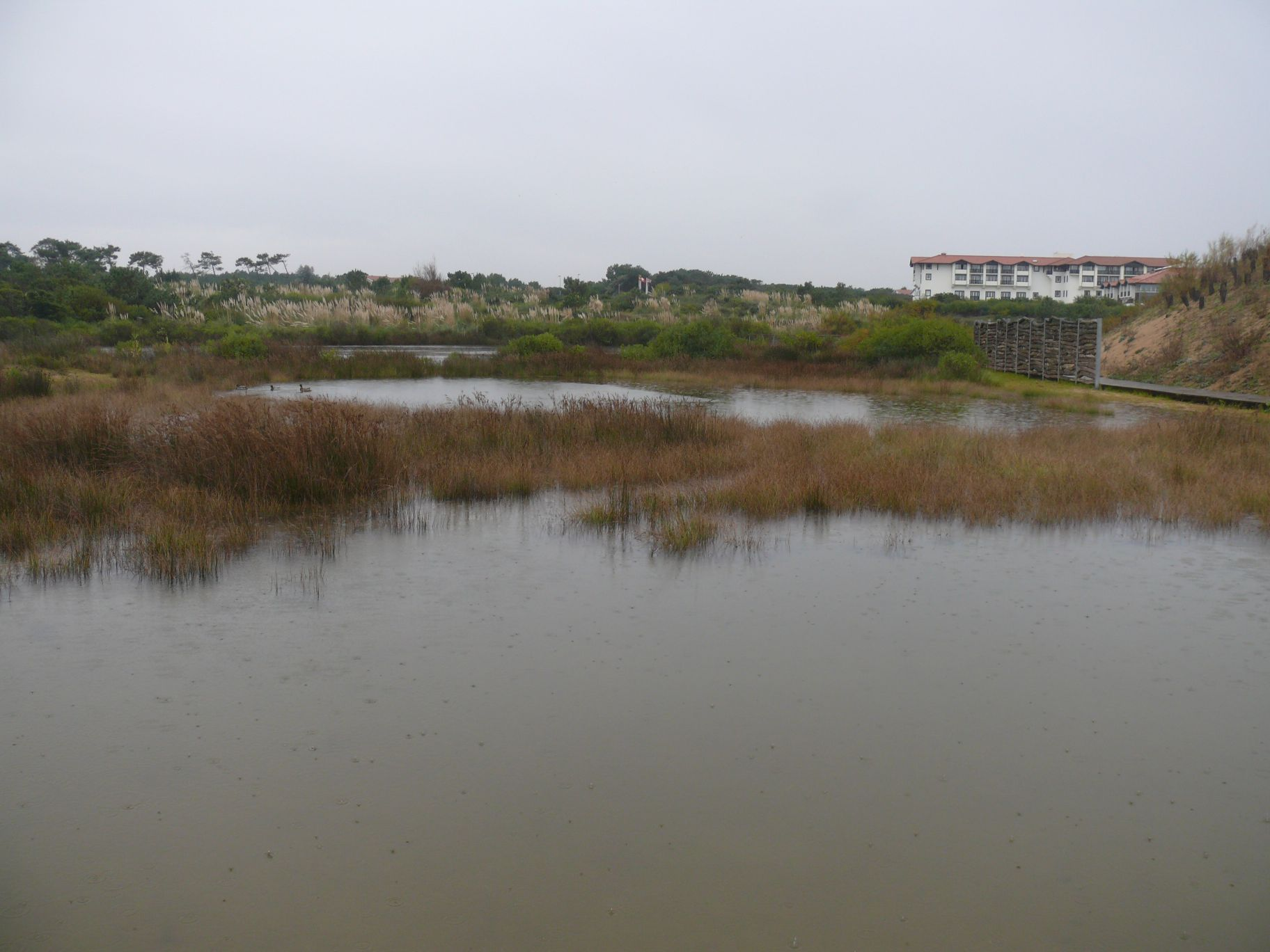
Izadia Park

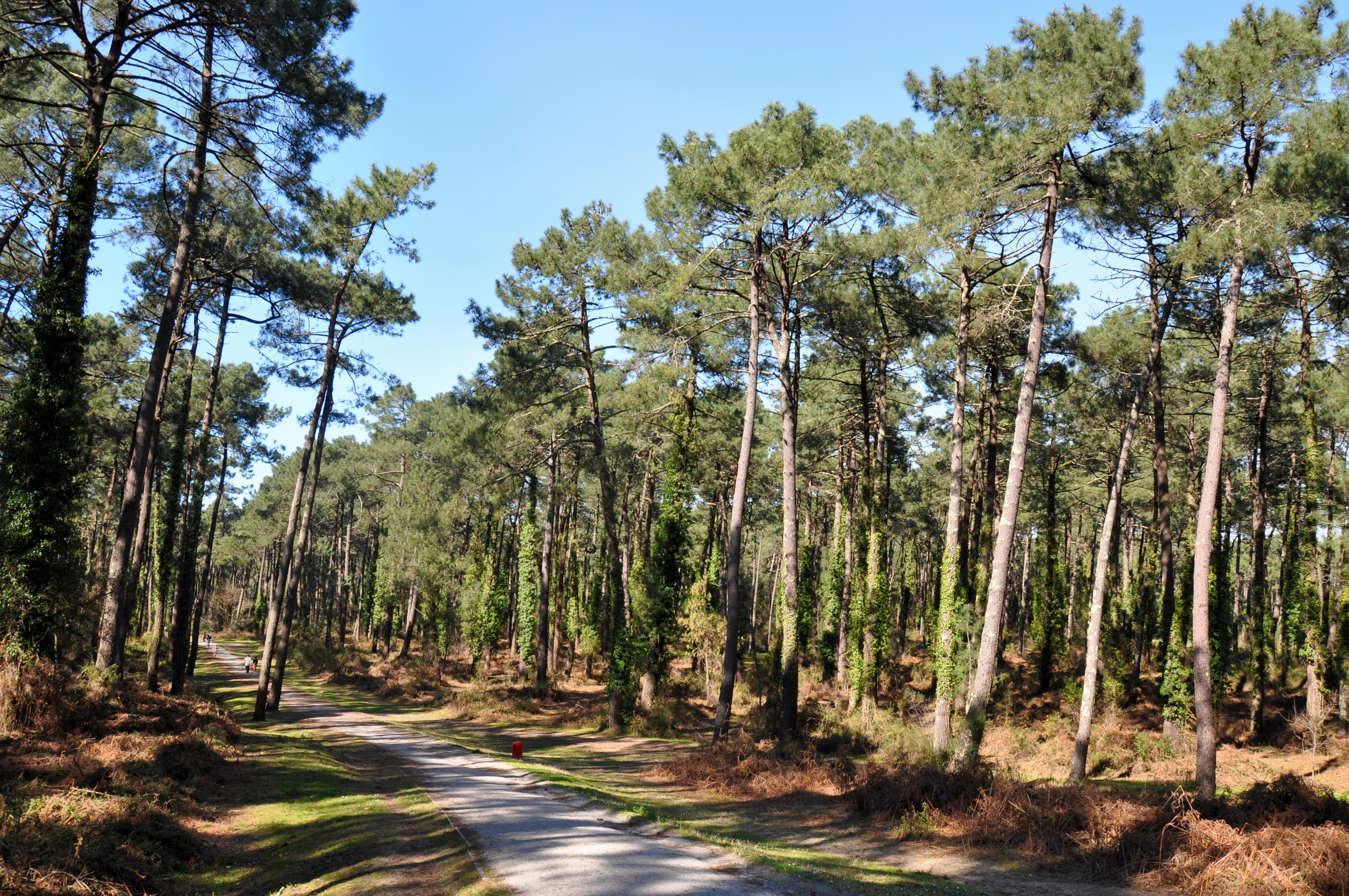
The Pignada Forest

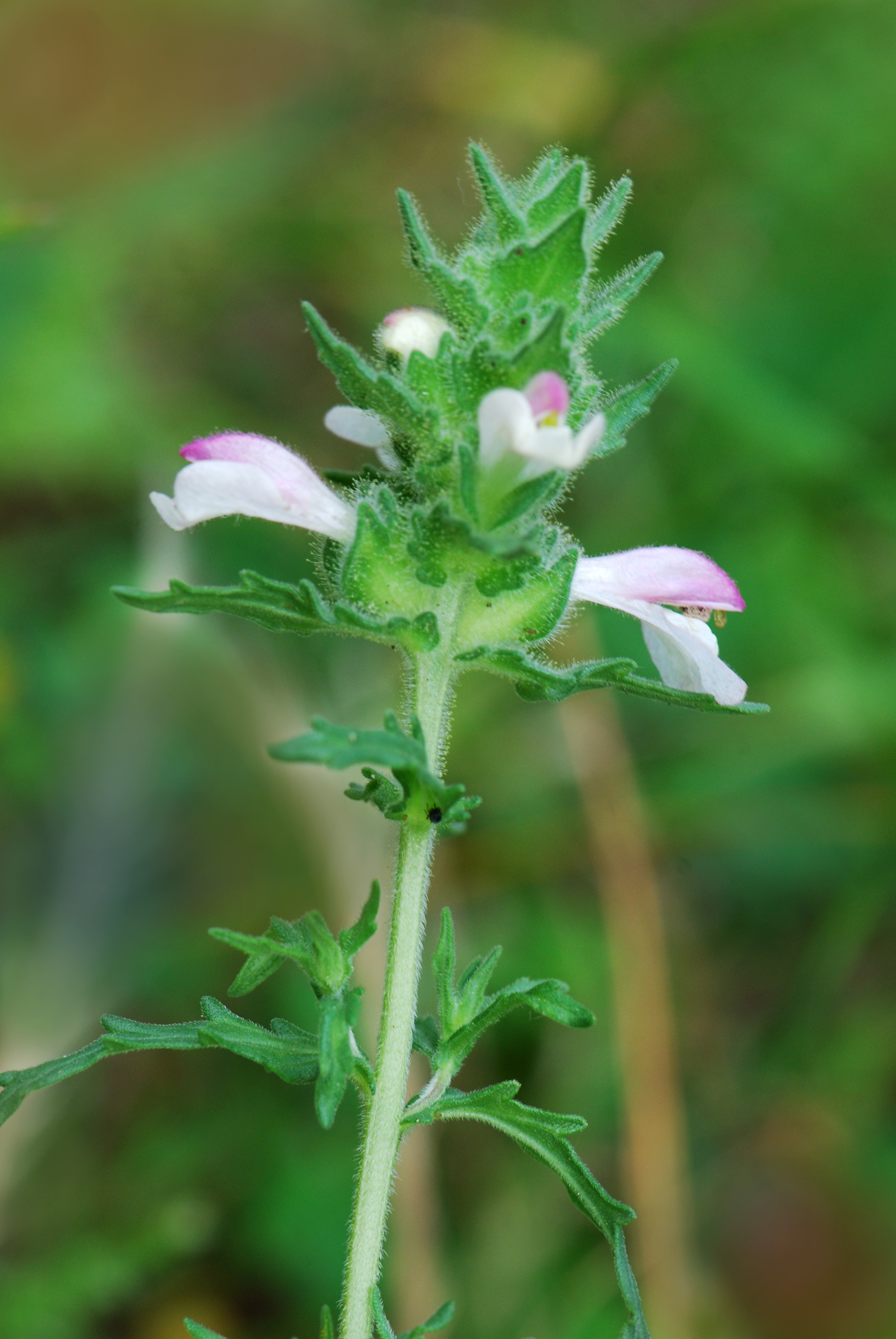
Bellardie

- The cave of the Chambre d'Amour is part of the heritage of the commune.
- The Izadia Ecological Park (literary root meaning "the being, the nature" in Basque) was inaugurated in November 2007 in the area of la Barre. It is an urban park of 14 hectares and is one of the last vestiges of a "dune environment" coastline. In this park, one of the ambitious project is the reinstatement of the original species and therefore the removal of endemic species, such as Pampa reeds to cite one example. It includes a lagoon, lakes of brackish water, an expanse of sedge marsh, and marine bulrushes. There are also more arid environments encountered such as heath and Helianthemum sand grass. 200 plant species have been identified. Among them there are 7 heritage species with national, regional or departmental protective statutes: Œillet de France (Dianthus gallicus) is protected at the national level; Bellardie (Bartsia trixago), Maritime Ruppia, and Lotus are protected at the regional level; and Glaux (Lysimachia maritima) and Clypéole (Clypeola jonthiaspi) is protected at departmental level. Finally, there is the iconic Centaurea with dense flowers for which the park is the only known location in France. More than 4700 birds were observed in 2012 of 103 different species. Among these species, 60 are protected including 16 classified in the red list of threatened birds species of France.
- The Pignada is a forest of 220 hectares representing 10% of the city area. This is the largest green space in the Bayonne-Anglet-Biarritz agglomeration. The Anglet forestry domain is divided between various pine, pignada (the largest with more than 200 hectares), chiberta (a coastal pine forest which is now urbanized in an upscale subdivision between la Barre and Chambre d'Amour), and the Lazaretto (a pinewood between Blancpignon and Adour). The forest is popularly called the Chiberta Forest. It is an urban forest because it is surrounded on all sides by various suburban districts. It is mostly a pine forest mixed with cork oak, ferns, and other broom. Until the early Middle Ages, the Anglet coastline resembled a sort of "no man's land": a sanded area of dunes and heath so pines were planted to reduce the spread of sand to the interior (planted from 1630 to 1640). Vineyards were once planted on these sands. Napoleon III revived the planting with a grant of 90,000 francs to plant 300 hectares of pine trees. At the beginning of the 20th century, it resembled the Landes mountains. It was exploited for the wood and resin. Of the 450 hectares that had a pine forest in the last century and a half, there remains more than 220 hectares.
- Montaury Park is located south of the NR10, part of the heart of the city project, is an urban park next to the scientific campus of the University of Pau and Pays de l'Adour. There is exotic vegetation: roses, hydrangeas, palms, and exotic ferns mixed with the existing vegetation of the park. Water is sprayed into basins with intermittent jets. There are children's games and walks.
- The Latchague Valley in Anglet. Landscaped retention ponds have been made to store rainwater from exceptional rainfall events which can occur each month, 10 years, or 30 years, and to regulate them. This park was created after the floods on the site in 2005. A little over 3 hectares, there is a landscaped path around the edge of the water from the Rue Latchague to the Rue Bahinos.

In its prize list of 2012, the National Council of Cities and Villages in Bloom of France awarded four flowers to the commune in the Contest of cities and villages in bloom.

== Amenities ==
=== Education ===
The town has many public kindergartens (Camiade, Jules Ferry, Aristide Briand, Jean Jaurès, Evariste Galois, and Tivoli), two colleges (Endarra college and the private Stella Maris college), two schools (Technological School of Cantau and the Sainte-Anne school) and an ikastola (Angeluko ikastola). Furthermore, a Building Institute, an art school and a unit of the National Conservatory of Arts and Crafts are present in the commune.

Montaury Park hosts disciplines from the University of Pau and Pays de l'Adour such as those dealing with biology, physics, chemistry, logistics, and construction and public works.

=== Internet ===
In 2010 the commune of Anglet was awarded the label "Internet City @@@@".

=== Sports and sports facilities ===
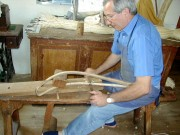
Making a chistera

- Aikido: the Aikido Dojo of Angloy is the 20th largest club in France in number of members with more than 560 active members;
- Basketball: the ACBB is a mixed club with the pennant team playing in the National 2 Championship of France;
- Riding: the Equestrian club of the Basque coast already had its 50th year in 2006 and is an association under the law of 1901. With almost 500 active members it is the second largest club in Aquitaine;
- Football: the Genêts d'Anglet play in the CFA;
- Golf: The commune has two golf courses: the Chiberta Par 71 Course which provided a test of skills at qualifications for the Open de France in 2005; and the Golf du Phare which was created in 1888 and is located in the communes of Anglet and Biarritz;
- Ice hockey, figure skating and ice dancing at the rink of la Barre. The ice hockey team of Anglet Hormadi Élite competes in Division 1;
  - Figure skating: the French Figure Skating championships in 1981 took place at the rink at la Barre for 3 events: men's singles, women's singles and artistic couples;
- Basque pelota: The commune hosts the Hardoytarrak club created by Gilen Zaldunbide. Facilities are: three walls at left (El Hogar, Orok, Les Cigales, and Orok Bat), a wall at left in the open (in the forest of Lazaretto), three free places (Haitz Péan, Hardoytarrak, and Orok Bat), three trinquets (El Hogar, Haitz Péan (trinquet and board trinquet), Oroc Bat);
- Inline hockey: the Artzak d'Anglet won the silver medal in the European Cup in 2006 and 2010. They became champions of France in 2011;
- Rugby union: the Anglet Olympique advanced to the second federal division;
- Skateboarding: The town has a skatepark on the seafront (in front of the la Barre beach). It has an L-shaped curb and rounded on the inside, an area of 1.80 metres (5.91 feet) in height, a pyramid, a spine, a rail, a flat-bar, a double table (small 20 centimetres (7.9 inches) high, large around 20 centimetres (7.9 inches) high), and a triple spine (with a triangular top). It also includes three concreted hollows. The skatepark occupies a space approximately 200 metres (660 feet) long and about 50 metres (160 feet) wide;
- Surfing and board sports: the various beaches host many male and female international competitions. Anglet is a spot known around the world (the city hosted the board sports championship of France in the summer of 2005, the Quiksilver Air Show, the O'Neill Pro, the O'Neil Angel's Challenge, the KanaMissCup, the Coupe de France Open Bodyboard, the Wake n'Ski Tour, and the OP Royal Single Trophy. The Anglet Surf Club is the biggest club in France with over 1,200 members.

== Notable people ==
- Léon Jean Larribau (1889–1916), rugby union player
- Lucien Lelong (1889–1958), fashion designer, died here
- Elvire De Greef (1897–1991), member of the Comet Line in World War II, lived here
- Janine de Greef (1925-2020), teenage Comet line guide in World War II.
- Clément Duhour (1912–1983), athlete, singer, actor, film director and producer
- José Miguel Beñaran Ordeñana (1949–1978), Basque militant and key figur of ETA, killed here by the explosion of a bomb in his car
- Lyudmila Putina (born 1958), ex-wife of Vladimir Putin, owns a villa here
- Guy Forget (born 1965), tennis player and captain of the French Davis Cup team

== See also ==
- Communes of the Pyrénées-Atlantiques department
