= Carum leucocoleon =

Scientific classification
- Kingdom: Plantae
- Clade: Tracheophytes
- Clade: Angiosperms
- Clade: Eudicots
- Clade: Asterids
- Order: Apiales
- Family: Apiaceae
- Genus: Carum
- Species: C. leucocoleon

Binomial name
- Carum leucocoleon Boiss. & A.Huet

Synonyms
- Carum leucocoleon var. porphyrocoleon Freyn & Sint. 1895; Carum porphyrocoleon (Freyn & Sint.) Woronow ex Schischk. 1950

Species of plant in the carrot family native to Türkiy

Carum leucocoleon is a perennial species of plant in the Apiaceae family. It was described by Pierre Edmond Boissier and Alfred Huet du Pavillon in 1856.

== Distribution ==
The species is native to Turkey and the Caucasus.

== Conservation status ==
The species' conservation status is "not threatened".
