= Hôtel de Ville, Anglet =

Town hall in Anglet, France

Hôtel de Ville
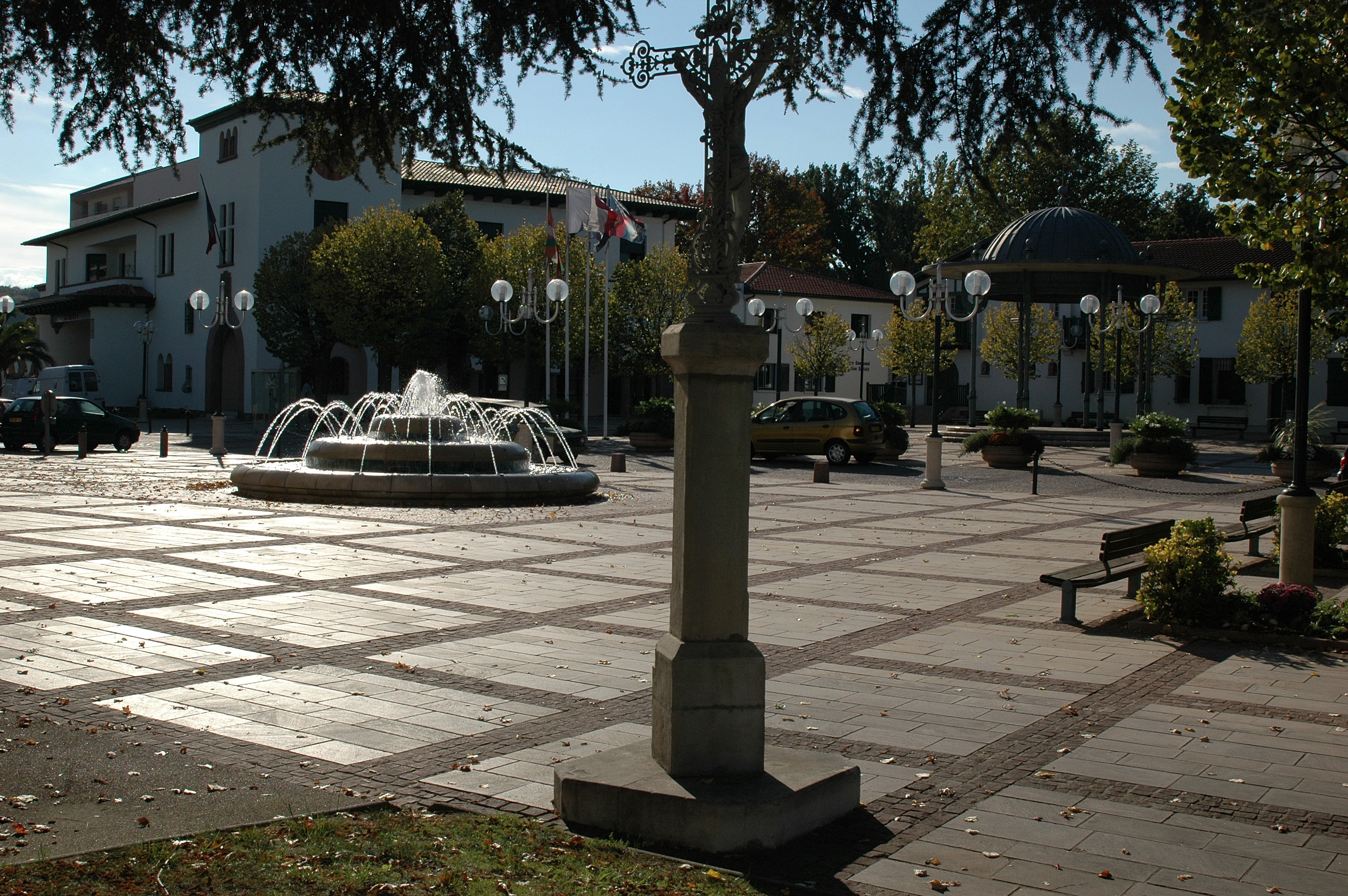
- The main frontage of the Hôtel de Ville in August 2006
- Interactive map of the Hôtel de Ville area

General information
- Type: City hall
- Architectural style: Neo-Basque style
- Location: Anglet, France
- Coordinates: 43.4814°N 1.5151°W
- Completed: 1936

Design and construction
- Architect: William Marcel

The Hôtel de Ville (French pronunciation: [otɛl də vil], City Hall) is a municipal building in Anglet, Pyrénées-Atlantiques, in southwestern France, standing on Rue Amédée Dufourg.

== History ==
Following the French Revolution, the town council initially established an office in a building, which was also used as a school, close to the Church of Saint-Léon. This building was destroyed by British troops during the campaign in south-west France, part of the Peninsular War. The council relocated to Maison Laventure in 1814, to Maison Larrebat in 1823 and to Maison Pierre-Brun in 1824. In the mid-1880s, the council decided to commission a new building on a site opposite the church. The new building was designed in the traditional style, built in brick with a stucco finish and was completed in 1886.

In the early 1930s, after a significant increase in population largely associated with the tourism industry, the council led by the mayor, Albert Le Barillier, decided to commission a more substantial building. The site it selected was immediately to the south of the old town hall. Construction of the new building started in 1935. It was designed by William Marcel in the Neo-Basque style, built in brick with a stucco finish and was completed in 1936.

The design involved a long asymmetrical main frontage facing onto what is now Rue Amédée Dufourg. It was laid out around a courtyard and, in the central bay, there was a wide opening providing access to the courtyard. The opening was fronted by a porch, formed by a pair of semi-circular columns supporting a canopy and, on the floor above, there was a recess containing three casement windows. There was a colonnade to the left (at the southeast corner) and a three-storey clock tower to the right (at the northeast corner). Internally, the principal room was the Salle des Mariages (wedding room) which was decorated with a mural by José de la Peña.

The grand staircase was decorated with stained glass windows created by Jean Lesquibe and the floors were inlaid with tiles designed by Édouard Cazaux. The rooms were furnished with fine furniture including a buffet table carved by Christian Ortet in 1937 and a low table crafted by Christian Ortet and Jean Lesquibe the same year.

During the Second World War, the town hall was the headquarters of the southern Comet Line, a network founded by a Belgian woman, Andrée de Jongh, which was responsible for extracting some 800 allied airmen from occupied Belgium and France, smuggling them across the border into neutral Spain, and then evacuating them back to the United Kingdom. The use of the town hall for this purpose was facilitated by the mayor, François Dommain, who was dismissed by the Vichy regime, because of his French Resistance sympathies, in 1941.
