= Léon Jean Larribau =

France international rugby union player (1889-1916)

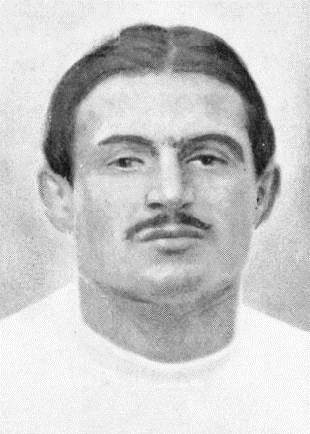
- Born: Léon Jean Aimé Larribau; 3 February 1889 Anglet, France
- Died: 31 December 1916 (aged 27)
- Height: 1.60 m (5 ft 3 in)
- Weight: 72 kg (11 st 5 lb)

Rugby union career
- Position: Scrum-half
Senior career
Years	Team	Apps	(Points)
	Biarritz Olympique	6	
International career
Years	Team	Apps	(Points)
1912–1914	France	6	(3)

Léon Jean Aimé Larribau (2 March 1889 – 31 December 1916) was a French rugby union player, killed in action during World War 1 near Verdun.

He's buried in Nécropole Nationale de Glorieux (tomb 2810)

Larribau was a 1.60m 72 kg scrum-half who played CA Périgueux until 1912, then for Biarritz Olympique and a French international. He was renowned for his long passes.

On 19 November 1954 the Aguilera stadium in Biarritz was renamed after him.

== Highlights ==
- 6 caps for France in 1912 (4 matches) and 1914 (2 matches)
- 1 try (3 points)
