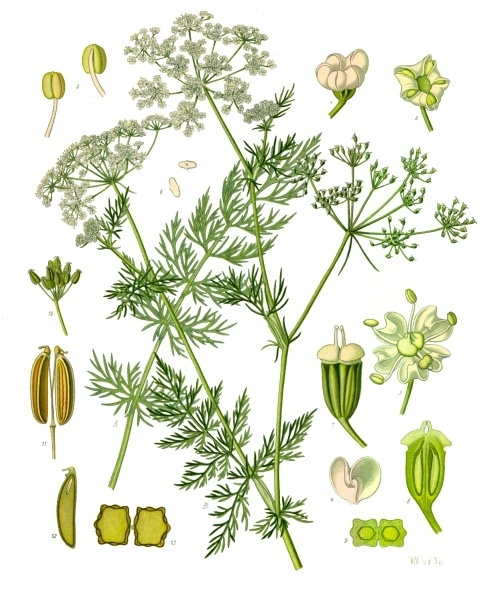
- Carum carvi

Scientific classification
- Kingdom: Plantae
- Clade: Tracheophytes
- Clade: Angiosperms
- Clade: Eudicots
- Clade: Asterids
- Order: Apiales
- Family: Apiaceae
- Subfamily: Apioideae
- Tribe: Careae
- Genus: Carum; L.

= Carum =

Genus of flowering plants

Carum is a genus of flowering plants in the family Apiaceae, native to temperate regions of the Old World. A well-recognized species is caraway (C. carvi), the seeds of which are widely used as a spice.

== Species ==
A total of 16 species are currently recognized:

- Carum appuanum (Viv.) Grande
- Carum asinorum Litard. & Maire
- Carum buriaticum Turcz.
- Carum carvi L.
- Carum caucasicum (M. Bieb.) Boiss.
- Carum graecum Boiss. & Heldr.
- Carum heldreichii Boiss.
- Carum iminouakense Quézel
- Carum jahandiezii Litard. & Maire
- Carum lacuum Emb.
- Carum leucocoleon Boiss. & A. Huet
- Carum meifolium (M. Bieb.) Boiss.
- Carum meoides (Griseb.) Halácsy
- Carum porphyrocoleon (Freyn & Sint.) Woronow
- Carum proliferum Maire
- Carum rupicola Hartvig & Strid
