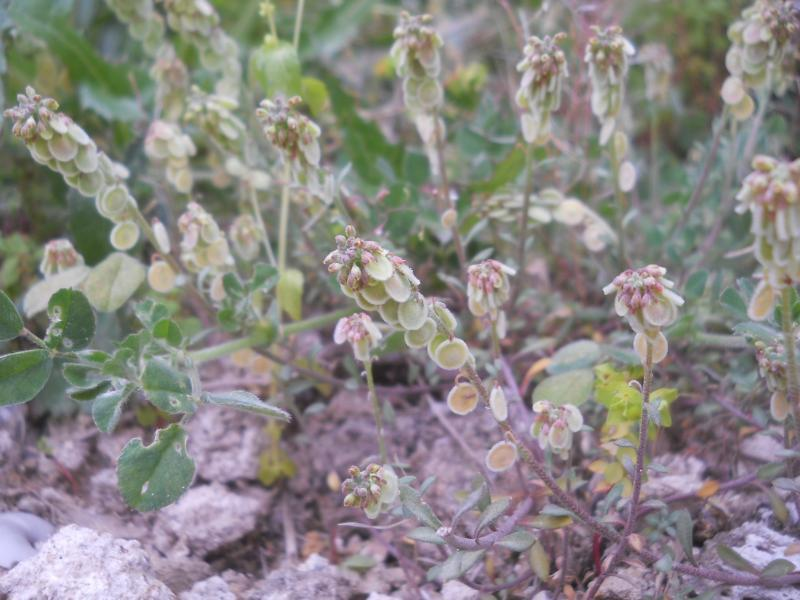
- Clypeola jonthlaspi

Scientific classification
- Kingdom: Plantae
- Clade: Tracheophytes
- Clade: Angiosperms
- Clade: Eudicots
- Clade: Rosids
- Order: Brassicales
- Family: Brassicaceae
- Genus: Clypeola; L. (1753)

Species
- See text

Synonyms
- Bergeretia Desv.; Fosselinia Scop.; Ionthlaspi Adans.; Jonthlaspi All.; Orium Desv.; Pseudoanastatica (Boiss.) Grossh.

= Clypeola (plant) =

Genus of flowering plants

Clypeola is a plant genus in the family Brassicaceae. It includes nine species native to the Mediterranean Basin, Western Asia, Arabian Peninsula, Caucasus, Central Asia, and Pakistan.

== Species ==
Nine species are accepted.

- Clypeola aspera (Weber) Turrill
- Clypeola ciliata Boiss.
- Clypeola cyclodontea Delile
- Clypeola dichotoma Boiss.
- Clypeola elegans Boiss. & A.Huet
- Clypeola eriocarpa Cav.
- Clypeola jonthlaspi L.
- Clypeola lappacea Boiss.
- Clypeola raddeana Albov
