= Alfred Huet du Pavillon =

French botanist (1829–1907)

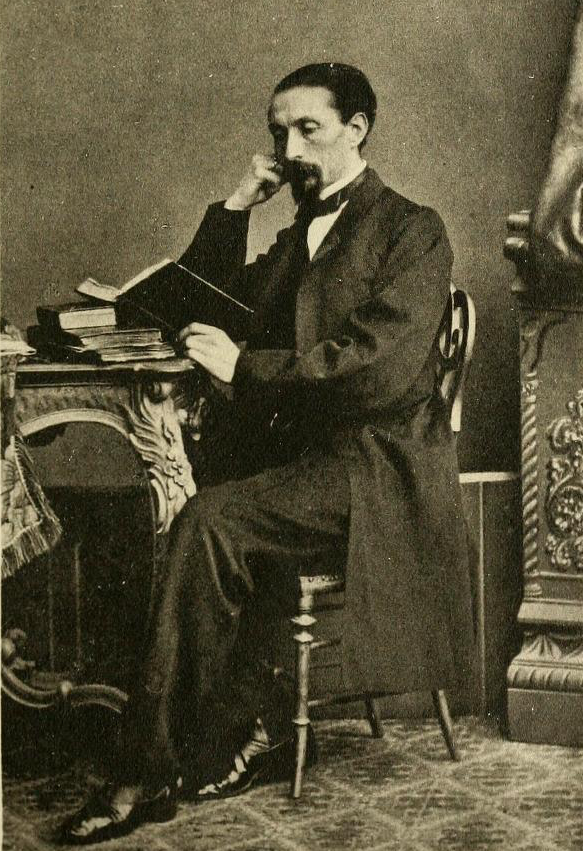
Image of Alfred Huet du Pavillon

Alfred Huet du Pavillon (January 1829, in Blain, Loire-Atlantique – 1907, in Frohsdorf) was a French botanist. His brother, Édouard Huet du Pavillon (1819-1908), with whom he often collaborated, was also a botanist.

He spent his childhood in Switzerland and later studying under botanist Alphonse de Candolle. From 1852 to 1856, he served as the curator of de Candolle's herbarium. In the 1850s, he embarked on a series of botanical expeditions to the Pyrénées, Armenia, Italy (including Sicily) and Sardinia. In Italy and Sicily, he was accompanied by his brother, Édouard Huet du Pavillon.

Together, the Huet brothers amassed an impressive herbarium and issued some widely distributed exsiccatae and exsiccata-like duplicate specimen series, among others in 1852 Plantes des Pyrénées, and in 1856 Plantae Neapolitanae and Plantae Siculae 1856. In 1856, Pierre Edmond Boissier introduced the genus name Huetia in honor of the Huet brothers.

== Associated writings ==
- Description de quelques plantes nouvelles des Pyrénées, 1853 - Description of some new plants of the Pyrénées.
- Notice biographique sur les botanistes Edouard et Alfred Huet du Pavillon, 1914, by Edouard Huet du Pavillon, Alfred Huet du Pavillon, and John Briquet.
