= Aroue-Ithorots-Olhaïby =

Aroue-Ithorots-Olhaïby Arüe-Ithorrotze-Olhaibi
- Commune
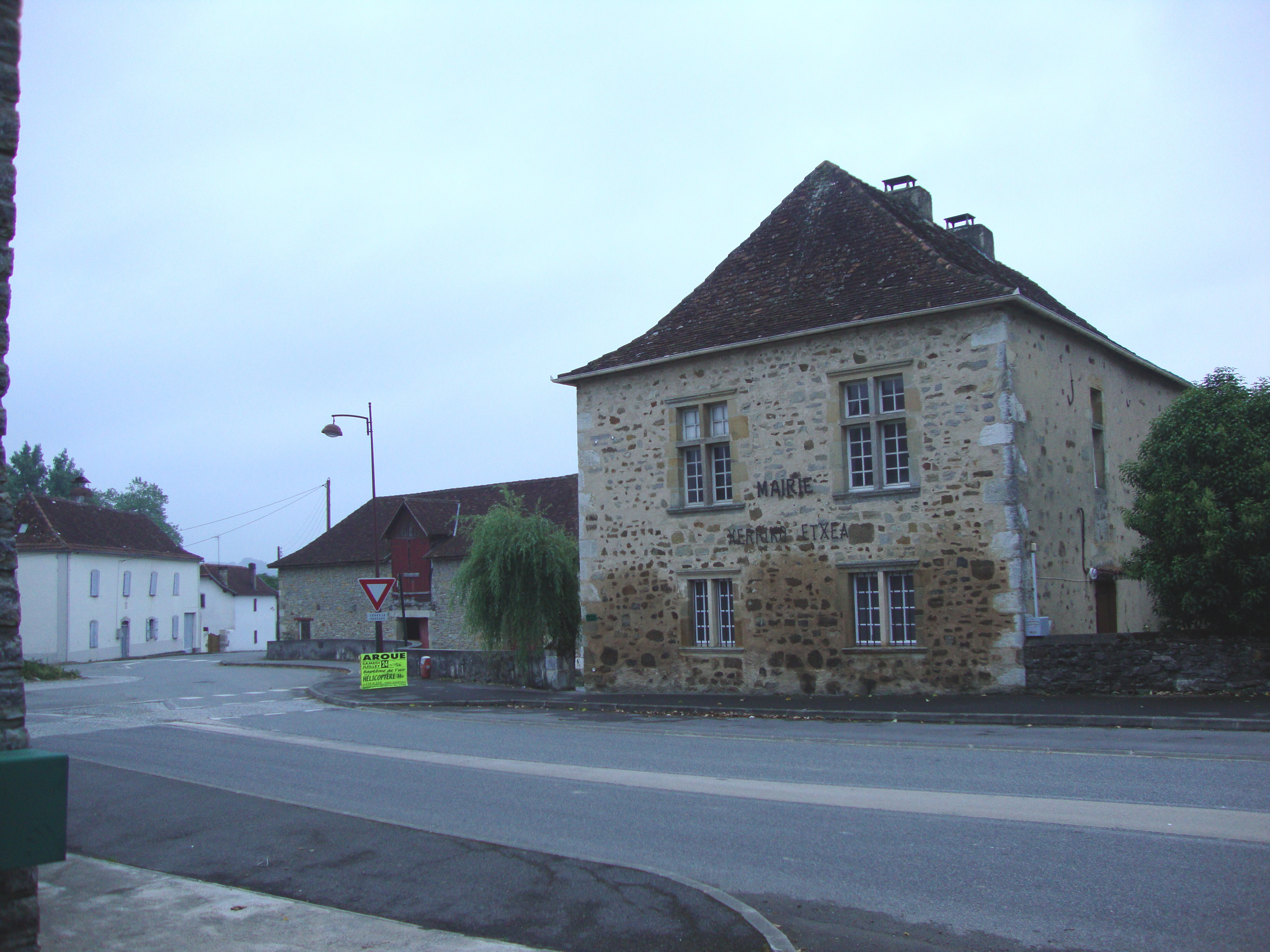
- The Town Hall at Aroue
- Location of Aroue-Ithorots-Olhaïby
- Location within France Location within Nouvelle-Aquitaine
- Coordinates: 43°19′09″N 0°54′59″W
- Country: France
- Region: Nouvelle-Aquitaine
- Department: Pyrénées-Atlantiques
- Arrondissement: Bayonne
- Canton: Pays de Bidache, Amikuze et Ostibarre
- Intercommunality: CA Pays Basque

Government
  - Mayor (2020–2026): Michel Sicre
- Area^{1}: 17.85 km^{2} (6.89 sq mi)
- Elevation: 114 m (374 ft)
- Highest elevation: 231 m (758 ft)
- Lowest elevation: 89 m (292 ft)
- Population (2023): 240
  - Density: 13/km^{2} (35/sq mi)
- Time zone: UTC+01:00 (CET)
  - Summer (DST): UTC+02:00 (CEST)
- INSEE/Postal code: 64049 /64120
- ^{1} French Land Register data, which excludes lakes, ponds, glaciers > 1 km^{2} (0.386 sq mi or 247 acres) and river estuaries.

Aroue-Ithorots-Olhaïby (French pronunciation: [aʁu itɔʁɔts ɔlajbi]; Basque: Arüe-Ithorrotze-Olhaibi) is a commune in the Pyrénées-Atlantiques department in the Nouvelle-Aquitaine region of south-western France. It is located in the historic Basque province of Soule.

== Geography ==
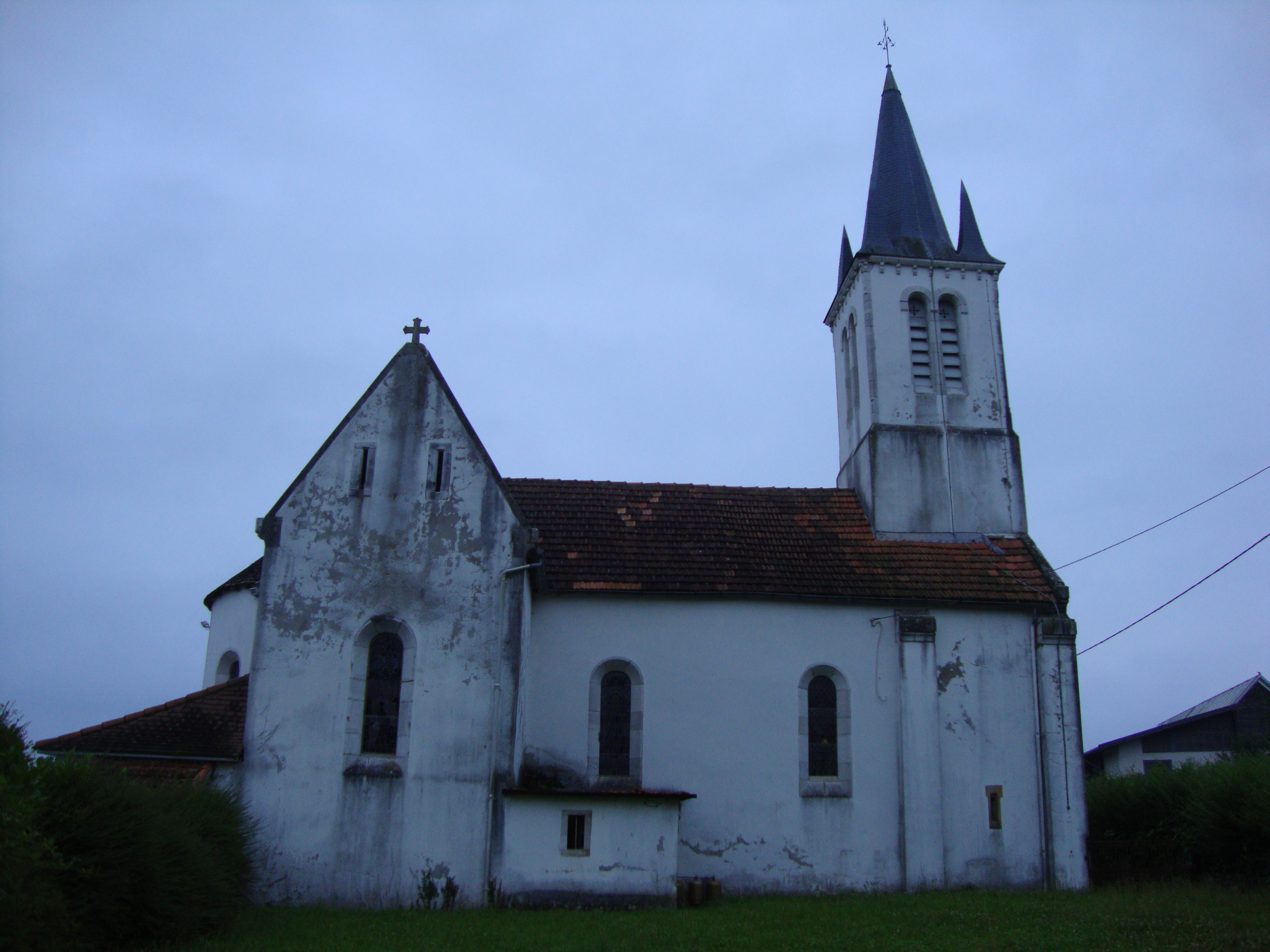
The Church of Saint-Étienne of Aroue in the morning sun.

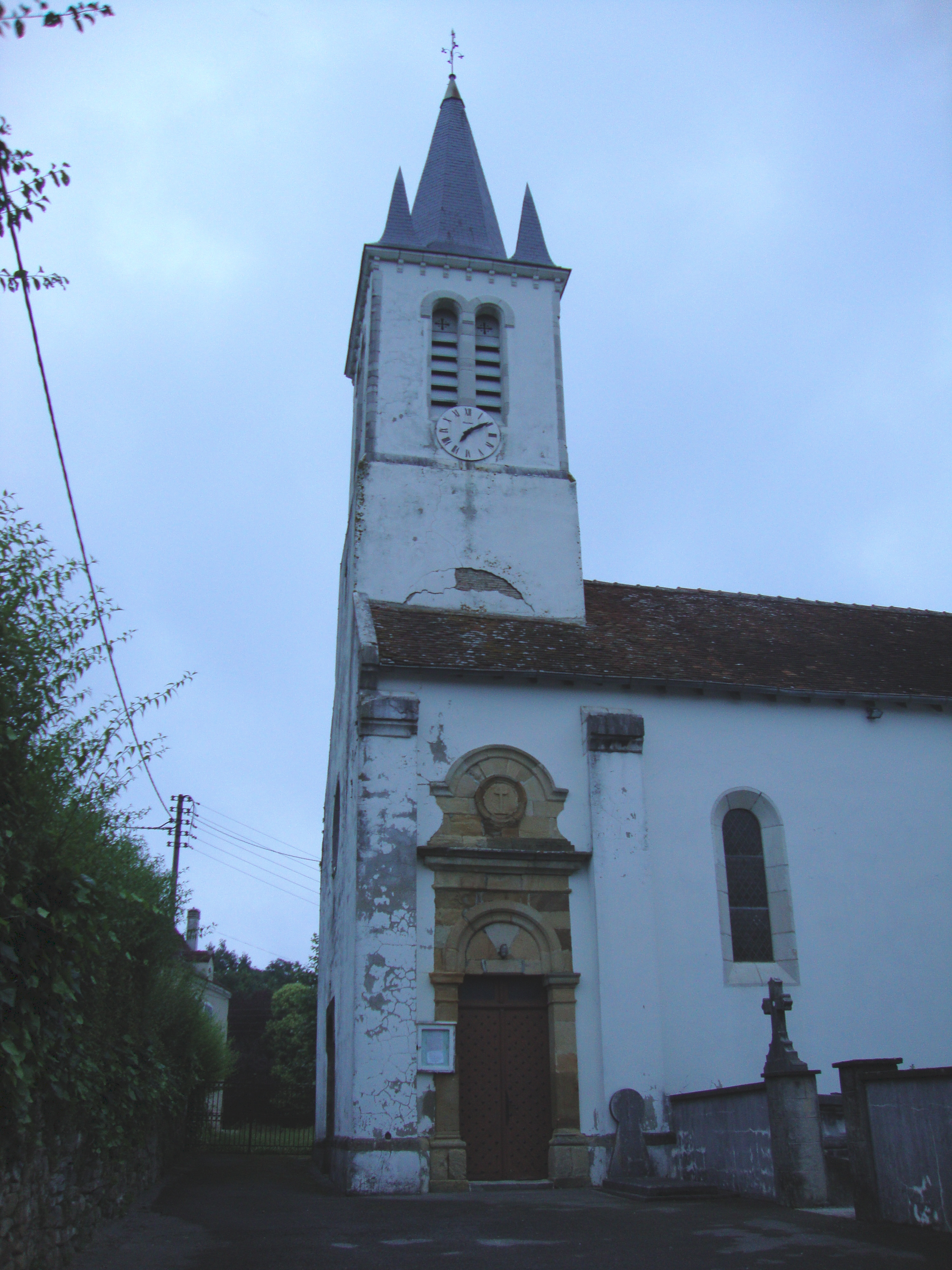
The Church Tower.

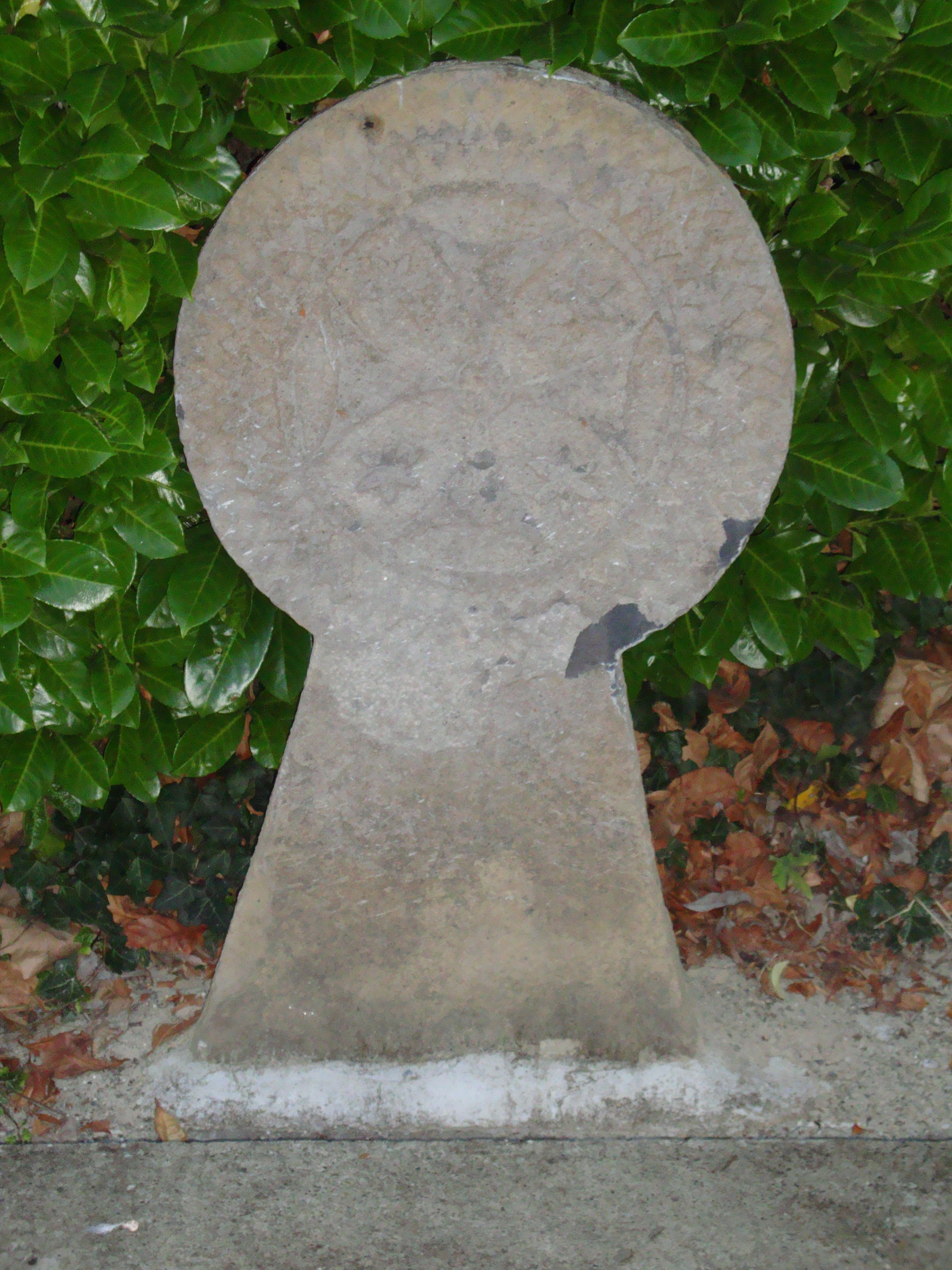
Hilarri in the cemetery in Aroue.

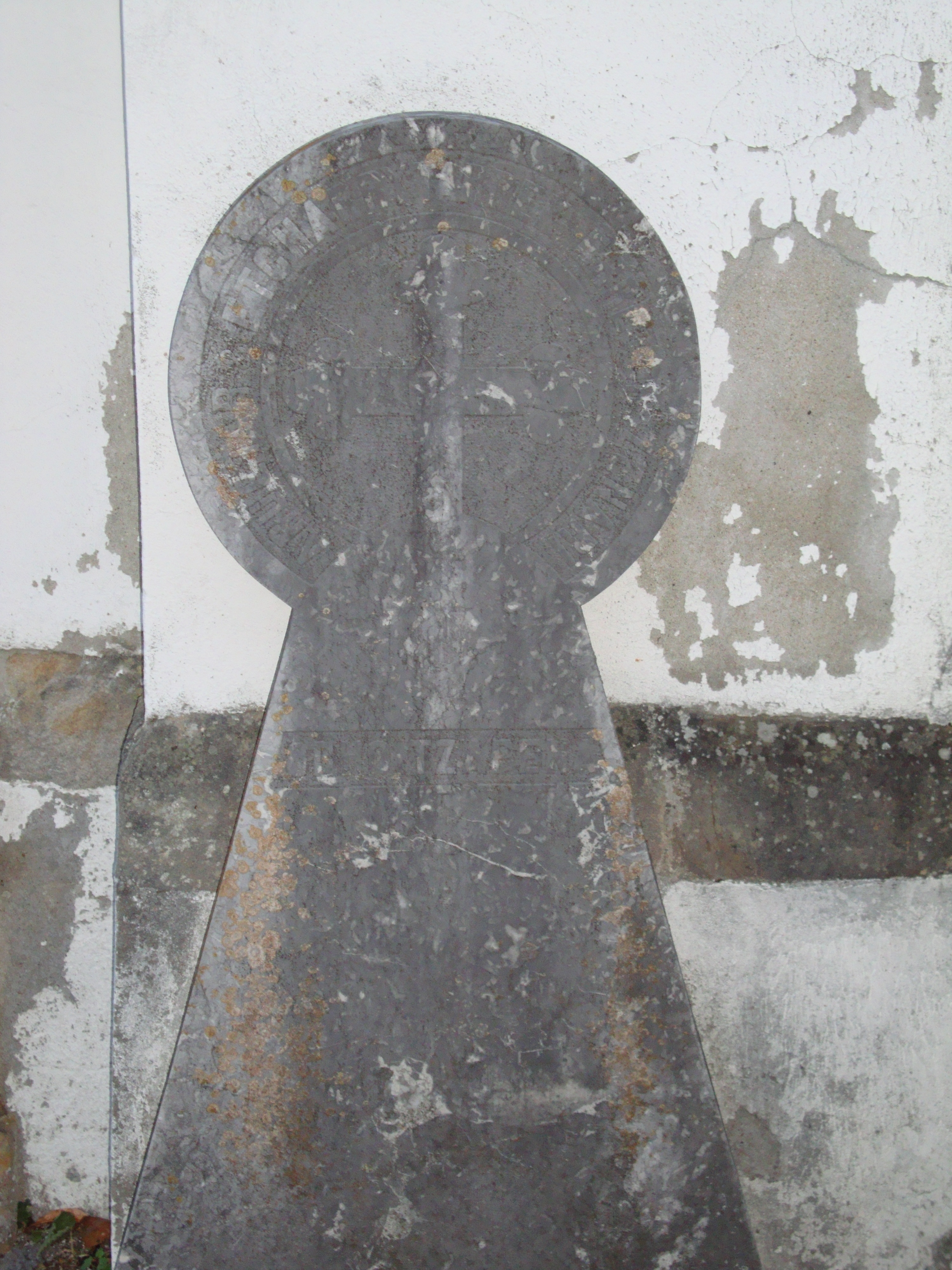
Hilarri in the cemetery in Aroue.

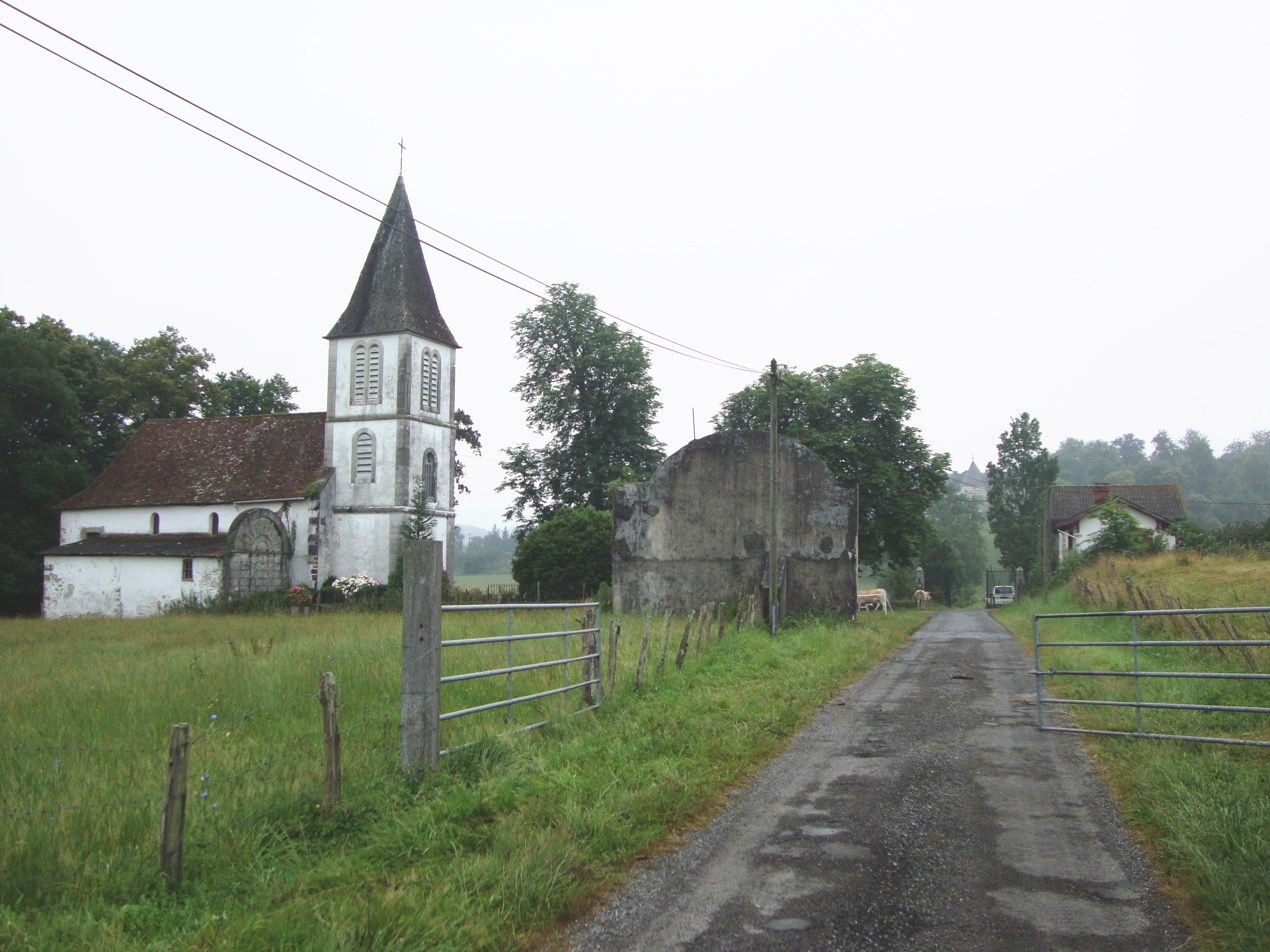
View of the hamlet of Ithorots, the church, and the fronton with a glimpse of the chateau in the background.

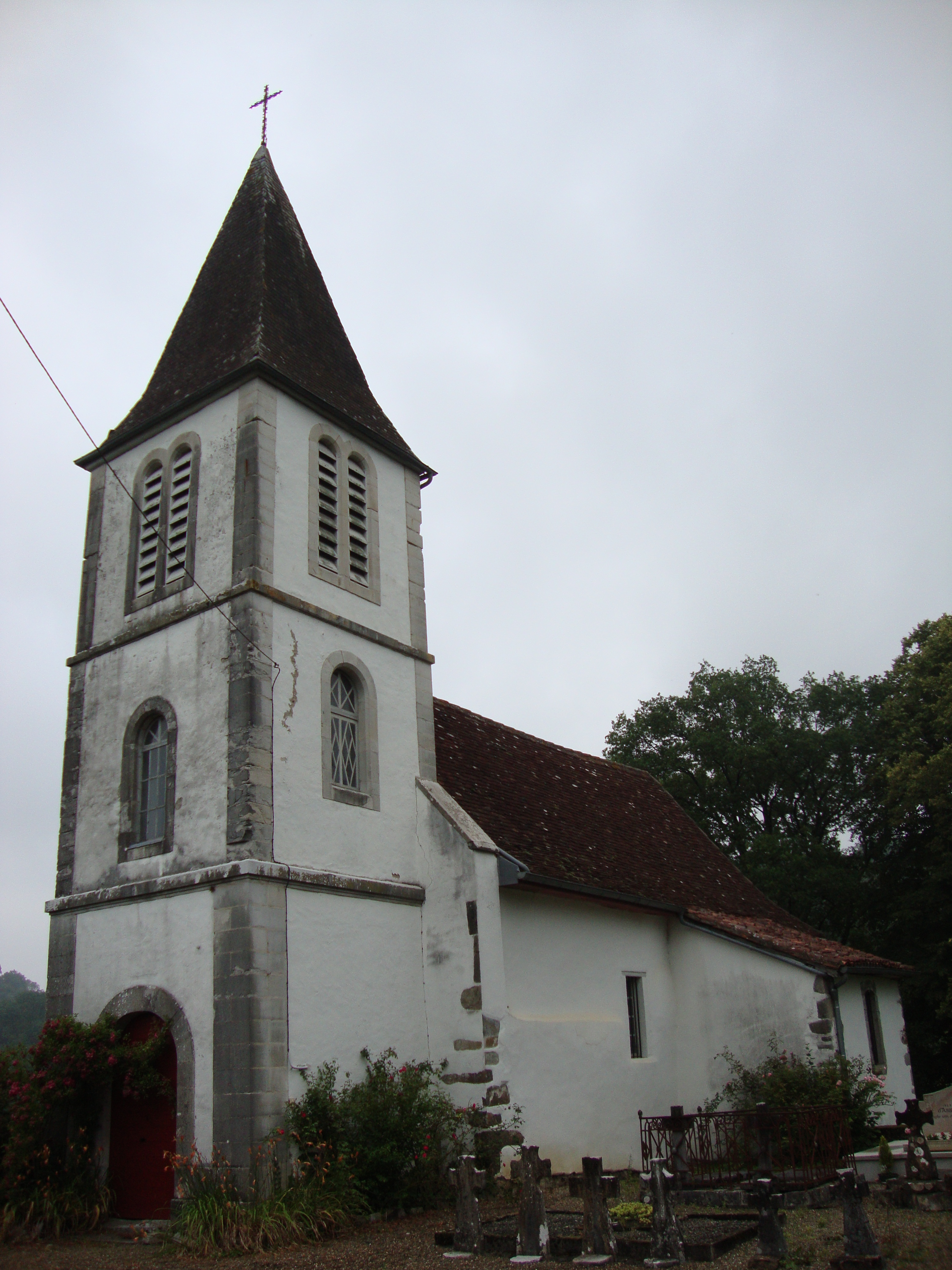
The church at Ithorots.

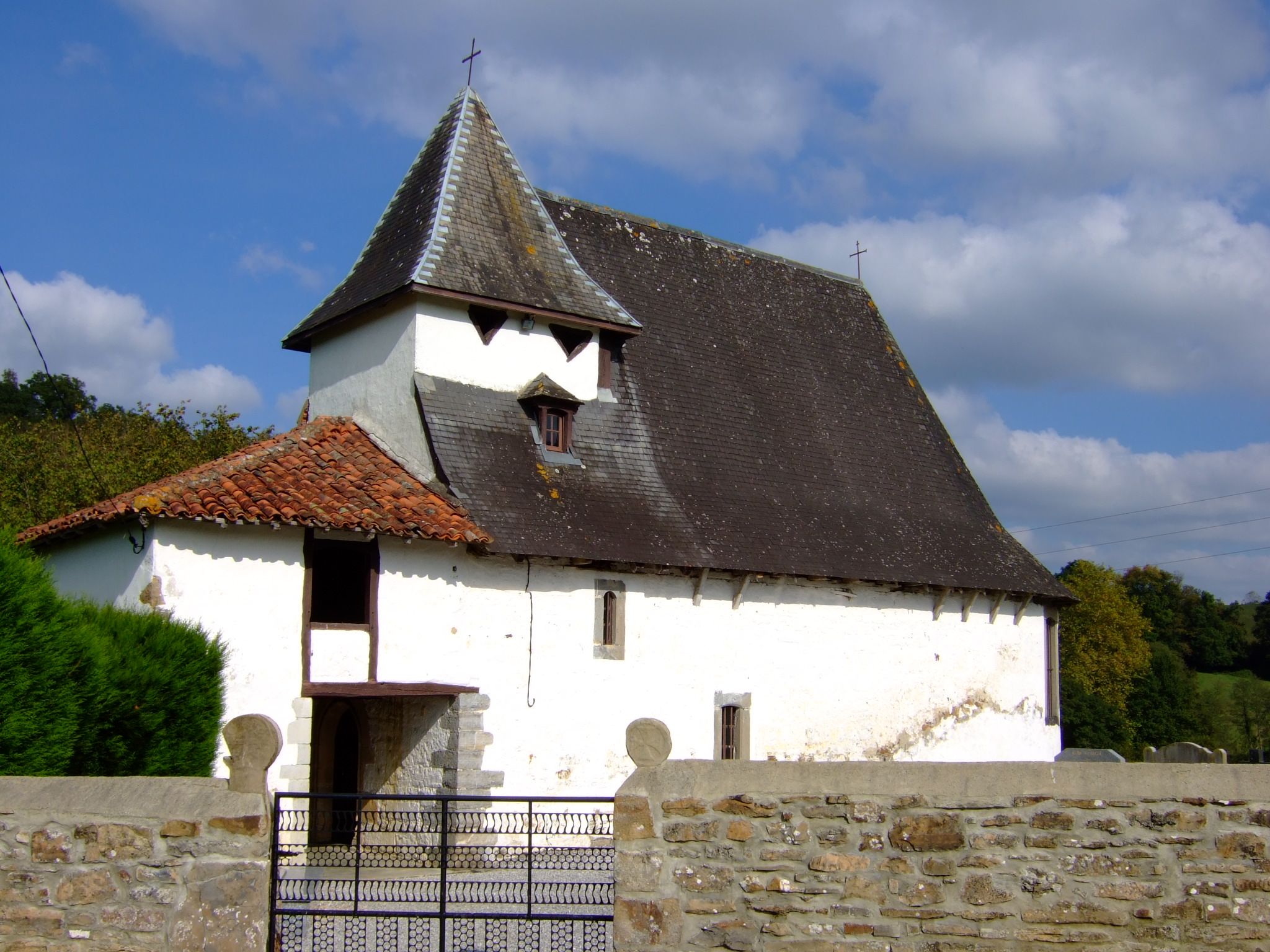
The Chapel at Olhaïbe.

Aroue-Ithorots-Olhaïby is located in the former Basque province of Soule some 10 km east of Saint-Palais and 10 km south of Sauveterre-de-Béarn. Access to the commune is by the D11 road from Domezain-Berraute in the west passing through the west fork of the commune then Etcharry then the east fork and the village before continuing south-east to Charritte-de-Bas. The commune is mixed forest and farmland.

Located in the Drainage basin of the Adour, the commune is traversed from south to north by the Lafoure (a tributary of the Saison) with its tributary the Hourquet and the Lauhirasse with its tributary the Thiancoenia erreka.

=== Places and hamlets ===
- Abbadie (château)
- Aïntcia
- Aitzaguer
- Aroue
- Bagardoy
- Bartulague
- Begorre
- Beheria
- Benoscar (Forest)
- Bentaberria
- Berhon
- Berrogain
- Bethe
- Bidauria
- Bohoteguia
- Bouhaben
- Carriquiry
- Ertorraenia
- Etchebarnia
- Etcheberria
- Etchecoin
- Etchelecu
- Etchemborde
- Eyherabide
- Garay
- Guestereguia
- Hagoua
- Harguina
- Harguinaborda
- Ithorots
- Jaureguiberria
- Joantho (château)
- Landaco
- Landuchia
- Larraburuzahar
- Larrartia
- Lassartia
- Linchinbiague
- Mendiburia
- Mendicoi
- Mendionde
- Metcha (Mill)
- Olhaïby
- Olhassaria
- Oxaïby
- Oxart
- Oxidoya
- Oyhamburia
- Oyhenart-Chipi
- Oyhençabal
- Pagueguy
- Poulit
- Quillilauquy
- Salla
- Sallagaray
- Saubidet

== Toponymy ==
The commune name in basque is Arüe-Ithorrotze-Olhaibi.

Jean-Baptiste Orpustan indicated that Ithorots possibly signified "source of cold water" and Olhaïby "the ford of the huts".

The following table details the origins of the commune name and other names in the commune.

Name	Spelling	Date	Source	Page	Origin	Description
Aroue	Aroe	1337	Orpustan	228		Village
	Aroa	1385	Raymond	11	Duchesne	
	Aroe	1460	Raymond	11	Ohix	
	Sent Stephen d'Aroe	1469	Raymond	11	Ohix	
	Degaierie de Aroa	1520	Orpustan	228		
	Aroue	1690	Orpustan	228		
	Aroüe	1750	Cassini			
Ithorots	Ithorrodz	1337	Orpustan	233		Village
	Uthorrotz	1469	Orpustan	233		
	Itorrotz	1469	Raymond	84	Ohix	
	Utorrotz	1478	Raymond	84	Ohix	
	Utorrotz	1480	Raymond	84	Ohix	
	Ytorrotz	1482	Raymond	84	Ohix	
	Y Ptorrotz	1690	Orpustan	233		
	Iptorrotz	1690	Orpustan	233		
	Ithorrotz	1750	Cassini			
	Ittorrolz	1801	EHESS (1)		Bulletin des Lois	
Olhaïbi	Olhaivi	1308	Orpustan	233		Village
	Olhabie	1375	Raymond	124	Luntz	
	Olƒabie	1376	Raymond	124	Military	
	Olhaibie	1385	Raymond	124	Duchesne	
	Olhabia	1407	Raymond	124	Duchesne	
	Olhayvi	1496	Raymond	124	Ohix	
	Olharby	1563	Raymond	124	Languedoc	
	Olhayby	1690	Orpustan	233		
	Olhaybié	1690	Orpustan	233		
	Olhaybi	1750	Cassini			
	Olhaiby	1793	EHESS (2)			
Abbadie	L'Abbadie	1863	Raymond	1		Lay Abbey of Ithorots, vassal of the Viscounts of Soule
Bartulague	Batrulague	1477	Raymond	22	Ohix	Farm of Ithorots-Olhaïby
	Barthulague	1863	Raymond	22		
Béloscar	Belhoscar	1496	Raymond	27	Ohix	Farm in Aroue
Lafaure	La Phaura	1538	Raymond	135	Reformation	Stream which rises in Aroue, crosses Etcharry and joins the Saison at Espiute
	La Phaure	1863	Raymond	135		
Olhassaria	Olhassari	17th century	Raymond	124	Arthez-Lasalle	Fief under the Viscounts of Soule
	Olhassarry	1863	Raymond	124		

Sources:

- Orpustan: Jean-Baptiste Orpustan, New Basque Toponymy on the page numbers indicated in the table.
- Raymond: Topographic Dictionary of the Department of Basses-Pyrenees, 1863, on the page numbers indicated in the table. (in French)
- Cassini: Cassini Map from 1750
- EHESS (1): Des villages de Cassini aux communes d'aujourd'hui: Commune data sheet Ithorots-Olhaïby, EHESS (in French).
- EHESS (2): Des villages de Cassini aux communes d'aujourd'hui: Commune data sheet Olhaïbi, EHESS (in French).

Origins:

- Duchesne: Duchesne collection volume CXIV
- 'Ohix: Contracts retained by Ohix, Notary of Soule
- Luntz:
- Military: Military Inspection of Béarn
- Languedoc: Confessions of Languedoc)
- Reformation: Reformation of Béarn
- Arthez-Lasalle: Titles of Arthez-Lassalle

== History ==
Paul Raymond noted on page 11 of his 1863 dictionary that Aroue was one of the seven districts of Soule and depended on the messagerie of Barhoue. There was a Lay Abbey at Ithorots, vassal of the Viscounts of Soule. The fief of Olhaïby was a vassal of the Viscounts of Soule and its owner was one of ten potestats of Soule.

The commune had a "Temple of Reason" during the French Revolution, undoubtedly because in the Béarnais region, Aroue was the only Basque commune to adopt the Jacobin anti-religion policy.

Between 1790 and 1794 Ithorots commune was merged with Olhaïby to form the new commune of Ithorots-Olhaïby. On 1 August 1973 (by prefectural order of 20 July 1973), the commune of Aroue merged with Ithorots-Olhaïby to form the new commune of Aroue-Ithorots-Olhaïby.

== Administration ==
List of mayors

From	To	Name
1953	2001	Franz Duboscq
2001	2008	Marcel Gégu
2008	2014	Jean-Pascal Barneix
2014	2020	Jean-Pierre Barneix
2020	2026	Michel Sicre

=== Inter-communality ===
The commune is part of eight inter-communal structures:

- the Communauté d'agglomération du Pays Basque;
- the AEP association of Pays de Mixe;
- the AEP association of Pays de Soule;
- the educational regrouping association of Arbérats-Sillègue, Arbouet-Sussaute, Aroue, and Etcharry;
- the Energy association of Pyrénées-Atlantiques;
- the inter-communal association for the functioning of schools in Amikuze;
- the joint forestry association for oaks in the Basque and béarnais valleys;
- the association to support Basque culture.

== Demography ==
The inhabitants of the commune are known as Arouetarrak. The population data given in the table and graph below for 1968 and earlier refer to the former commune of Aroue.

Historical population

Year	Pop.	±% p.a.
1793	464	—
1821	509	+0.33%
1846	500	−0.07%
1872	400	−0.85%
1901	328	−0.68%
1926	277	−0.67%
1946	270	−0.13%
1954	265	−0.23%
1962	268	+0.14%

Year	Pop.	±% p.a.
1968	223	−3.02%
1975	286	+3.62%
1982	249	−1.96%
1990	254	+0.25%
1999	230	−1.10%
2007	255	+1.30%
2012	247	−0.64%
2017	240	−0.57%
2023	240	+0.00%

Source: EHESS and INSEE

== Economy ==
The town is part of the Appellation d'origine contrôlée (AOC) zone of Ossau-iraty.

== Culture and heritage ==
=== Civil heritage ===
The village has architecture typical of the eastern Basque Country: gable roofs covered with tiles, whitewashed walls with houses from the 16th century.

As in many Basque villages, the fronton is adjacent to the church.

=== Religious heritage ===
Two churches are registered as historical monuments:

- The Church of Saint-Étienne at Aroue (12th century) is a Romanesque church rebuilt in the 19th century. There is a sculpture from the 12th century of Saint Jacques on a horse and a Spanish image of "Matamoro".
- The Church of Saint-Samson at Ithorots (19th century)
- The Church at Olhaïby has several items that are registered as historical objects:
  - A Retable over the main altar (18th century)
  - A Candlestick (17th century)
  - An altar cross (18th century)
  - A tabernacle at the main altar (18th century)
  - A candlestick (18th century)
  - Statuettes (18th century)
  - A Painting: The Martyrdom of Saints Cyr and Judith (18th century)
  - A Tabernacle, Retable, 2 Candlesticks, Statues, Altar Cross, and Painting (18th century)
  - A Processional Cross (18th century)

=== Environmental heritage ===
The town lies on the GR 65. It is at the beginning of the 7th section of the GR which is listed by UNESCO as World Heritage. The presentation file to UNESCO locates the commune on the Via Podiensis on the Way of St. James. There is no real historical justification for this but it is an important fact for this small town. Justification was found by Dr. Urrutibetehy, the pioneer who traced the paths in the region (it was he who set up the so-called Stele of Gibraltar and made a point of convergence of these paths). He saw in the horseman shown on the lintel of the door of the sacristy, a representation of Saint Jacques Matamoros.

== Notable people linked to the commune ==
- Franz Duboscq, born in Saint-Jean-de-Luz in 1924, MP and senator, former president of the council and mayor of the town until 2001.

== See also ==
- Communes of the Pyrénées-Atlantiques department
