= Darrieussecq =

Darrieussecq is a French surname of Basque origin. Notable people with the surname include:

- André Darrieussecq (1947–2020), French rugby union player
- Geneviève Darrieussecq (born 1956), French doctor and politician
- Marie Darrieussecq (born 1969), French novelist
