= Jardin botanique littoral de Saint-Jean-de-Luz =

Nonprofit botanical garden in Aquitaine, France

Jardin botanique littoral Paul Jovet
- Interactive map of Jardin botanique littoral Paul Jovet
- Type: Botanical garden
- Location: Saint-Jean-de-Luz, Pyrénées-Atlantiques, France
- Coordinates: 43.3855°N 1.6586°W
- Area: 2.5 hectares (6 acres)
- Founder: Paul Jovet
- Website: www.saintjeandeluz.fr/fr/decouvrir-saint-jean-de-luz/jardin-botanique-littoral/

The Jardin botanique littoral Paul Jovet (2.5 hectares) is a nonprofit botanical garden located at 31, avenue Bernoville Gaëtan, Saint-Jean-de-Luz, Pyrénées-Atlantiques, Aquitaine, France. It is open several days per week in the warmer months; an admission fee is charged.

The garden was first envisioned in the 1980s by French botanist Paul Jovet (1896–1991) of the National Museum of Natural History in Biarritz. Its first landscaping and pond excavation took place in 1991, with first trees planted in 1996 and plant exchanges begun in 2003. In 2008 it opened to the public.

The garden focuses on regional flora and the seacoast's natural environment. It is set atop a rocky cliff about 50 meters above the Atlantic Ocean, conserves indigenous oak-pine forests and wetland areas, and provides a range of plant habitats for local flora. The grounds are organized as follows: magnolia collection, plants from five continents, useful garden, Atlantic oaks, rock garden, coastal heathland, cliff plants, botanical squares, dunes, wetlands, and coastal oak–pine forest.

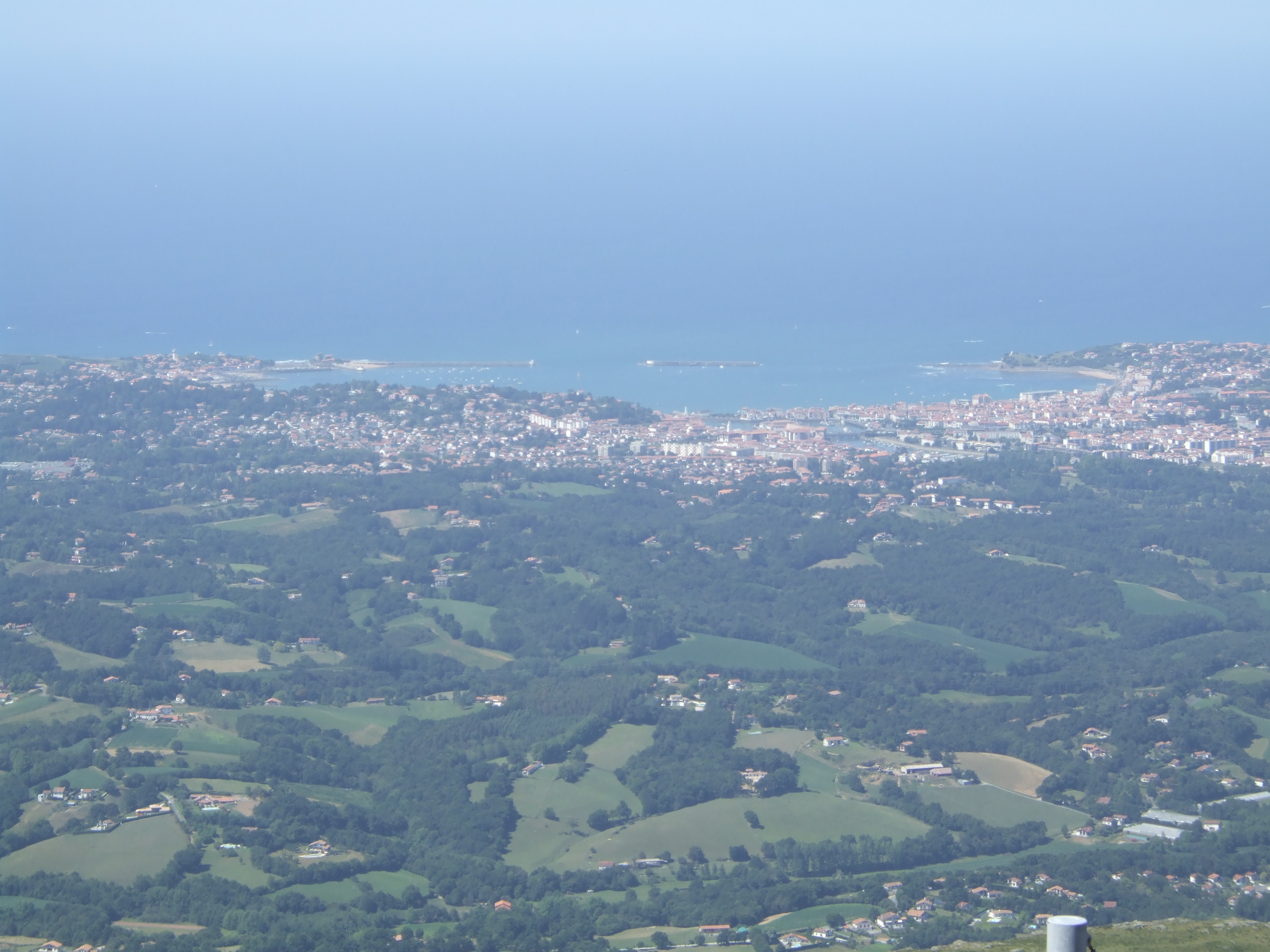
Jardin botanique littoral de Saint-Jean-de-Luz

== See also ==
- List of botanical gardens in France
