= Église Saint-Jean-Baptiste de Saint-Jean-de-Luz =

Church in the Northern Basque Country

Church of St John the Baptist, Saint-Jean-de-Luz
- Église Saint-Jean-Baptiste de Saint-Jean-de-Luz; San Joan Bataiatzailearen eliza (Donibane Lohizune)
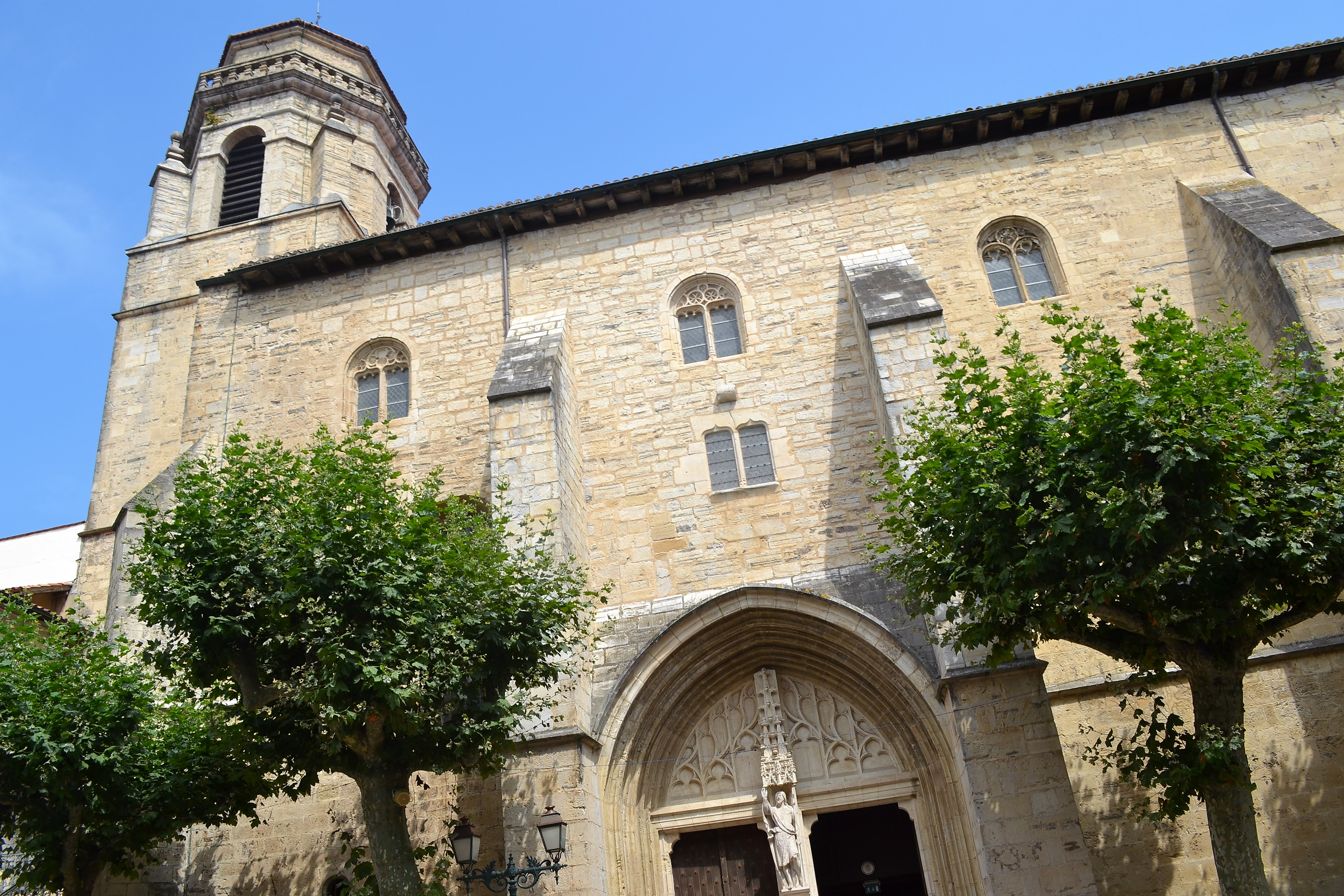
- Church of St John the Baptist, Saint-Jean-de-Luz
- 43.3883°N 1.6627°W
- Location: Saint-Jean-de-Luz, Nouvelle-Aquitaine
- Denomination: Roman Catholic

Architecture
- Heritage designation: Monument historique
- Completed: 1685

The Church of St John the Baptist, Saint-Jean-de-Luz (French: Église Saint-Jean-Baptiste de Saint-Jean-de-Luz; Basque: San Joan Bataiatzailearen eliza (Donibane Lohizune)) is a Roman Catholic church in the commune of Saint-Jean-de-Luz, in the French department of Pyrénées-Atlantiques.

== History ==
Louis XIV was married in the church on 9 June 1660.

== Architecture ==
The church is known for its monumental altarpiece, in carved gilded wood, that occupies the entire height of the back wall of the apse, and the two wings that flank it.

The church has been a Monument historique since 1931.

== Gallery ==
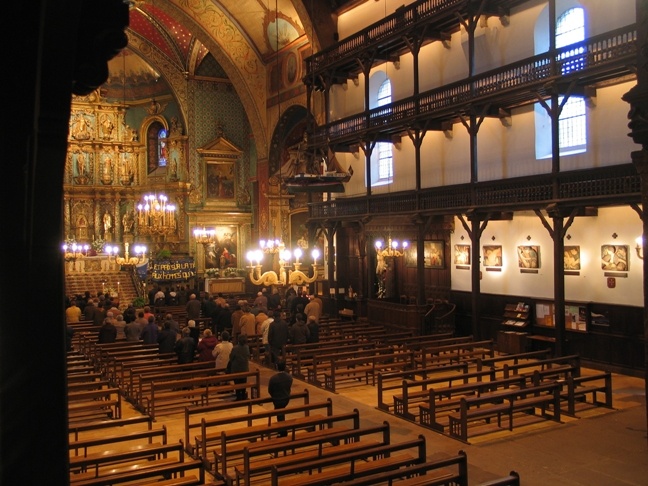
Interior

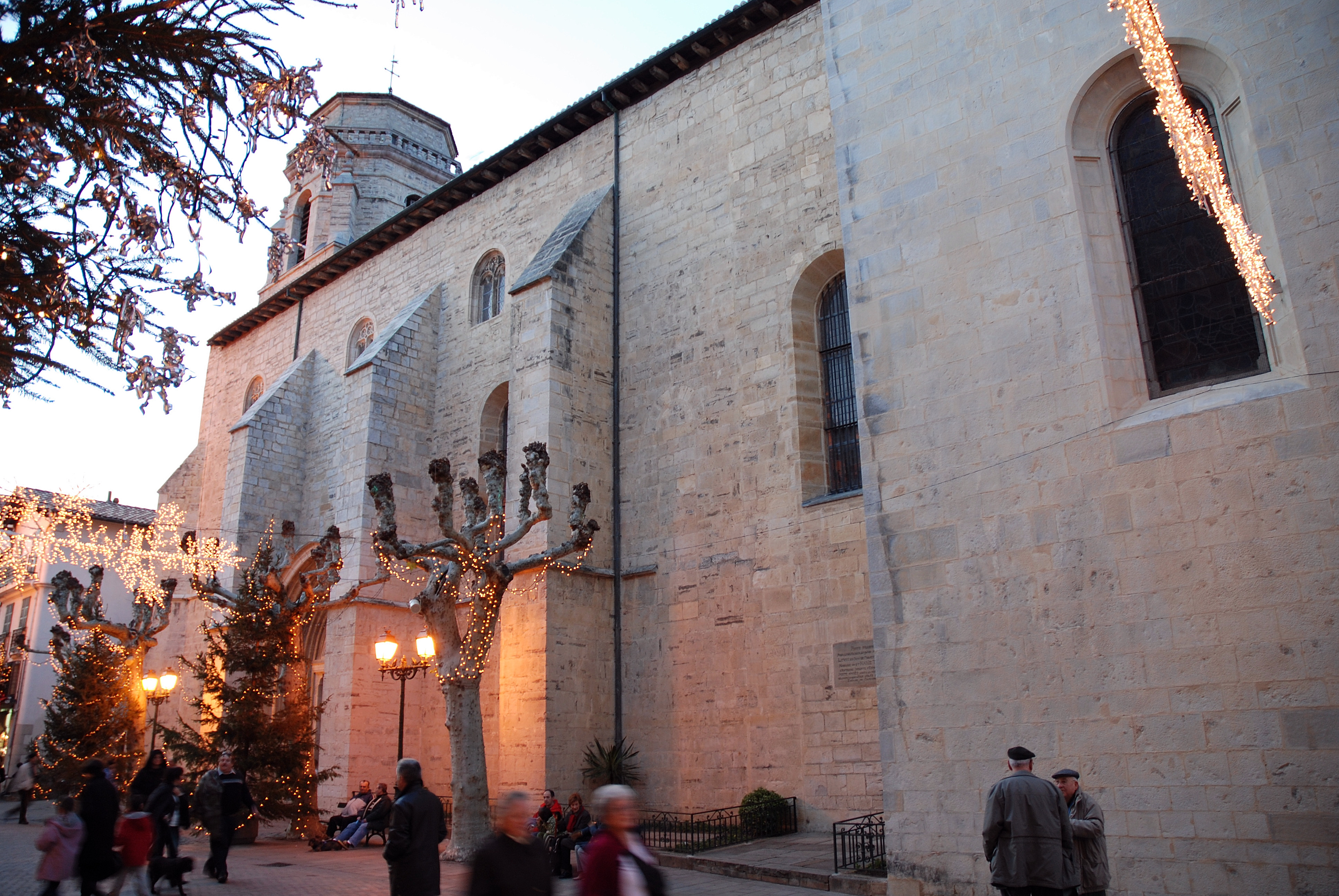
Exterior

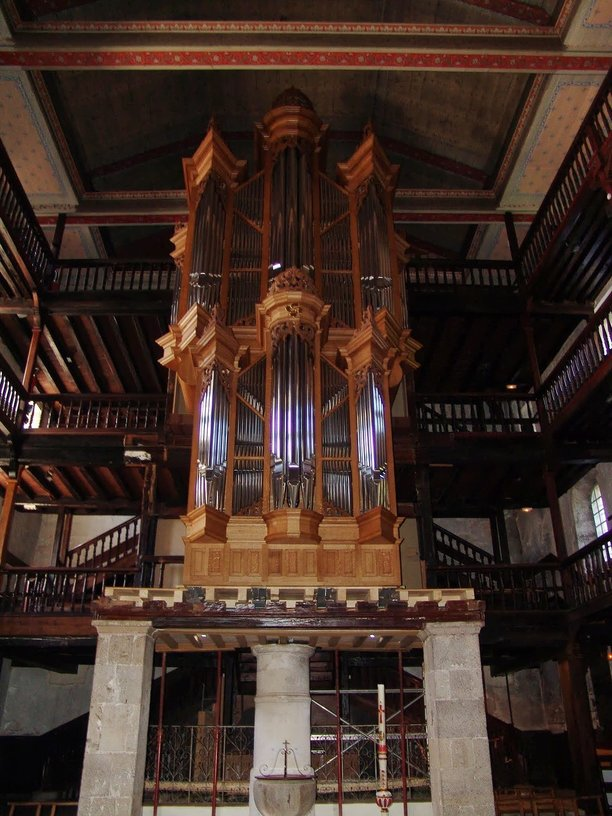
The organ

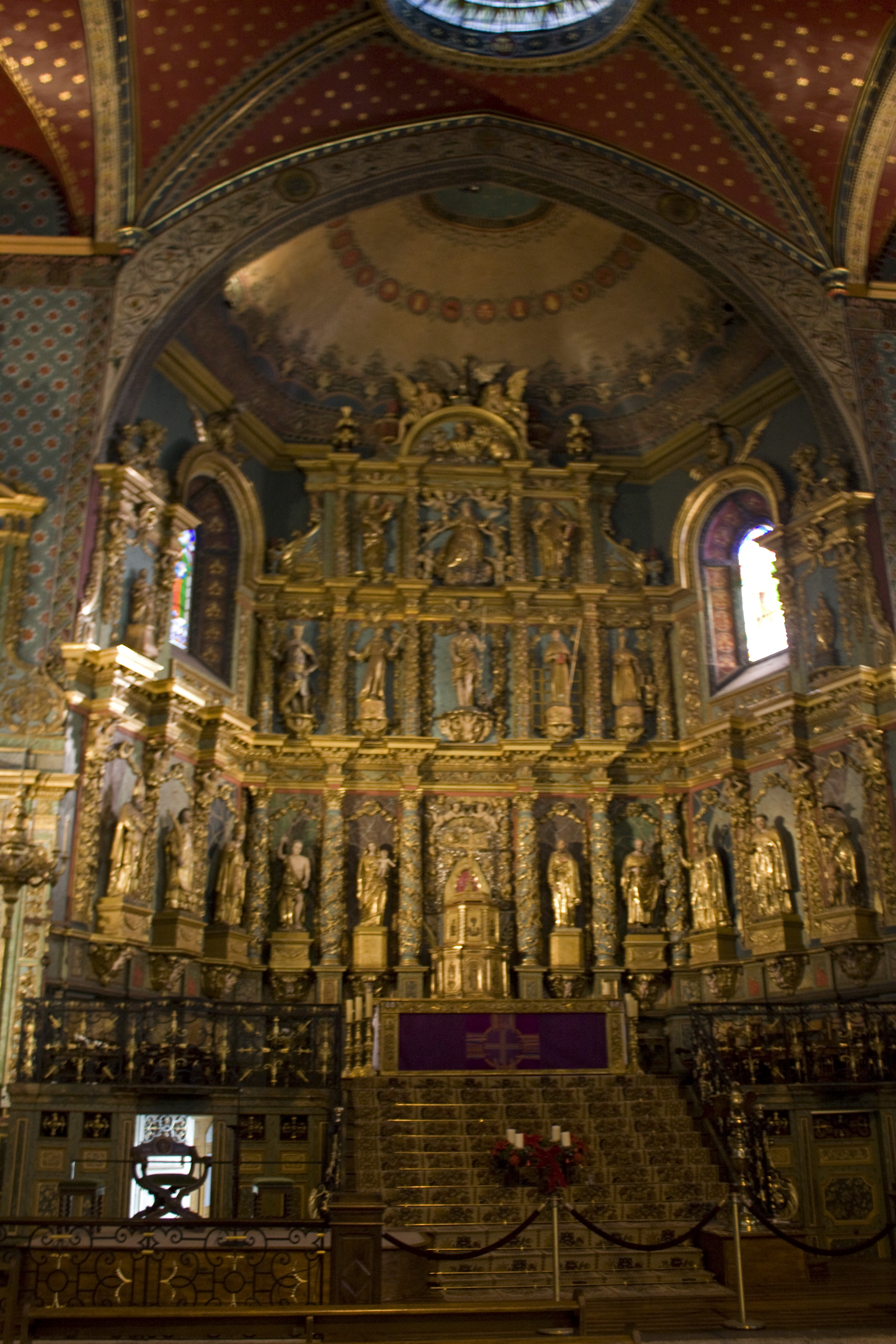
The altarpiece

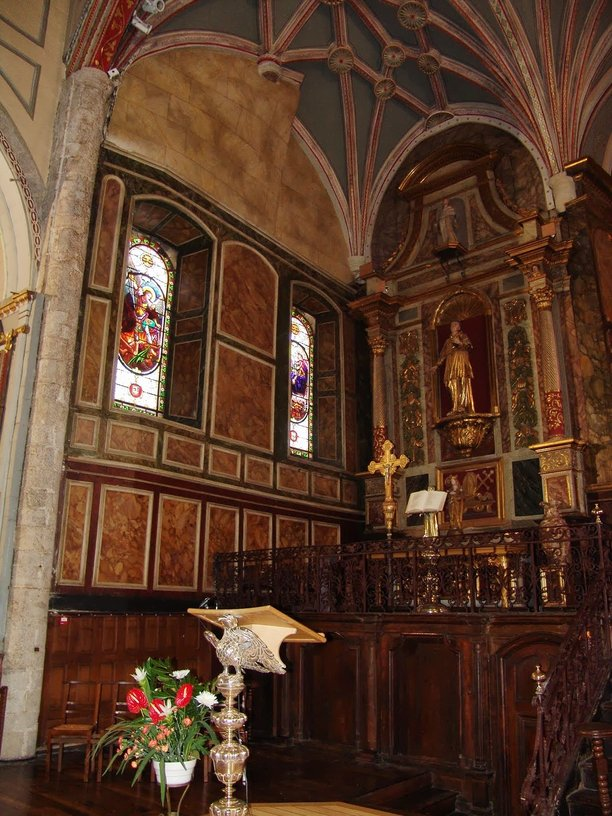
The pulpit
