= Saint-Jean-de-Luz =

Saint-Jean-de-Luz Donibane Lohizune (Basque)
- Commune
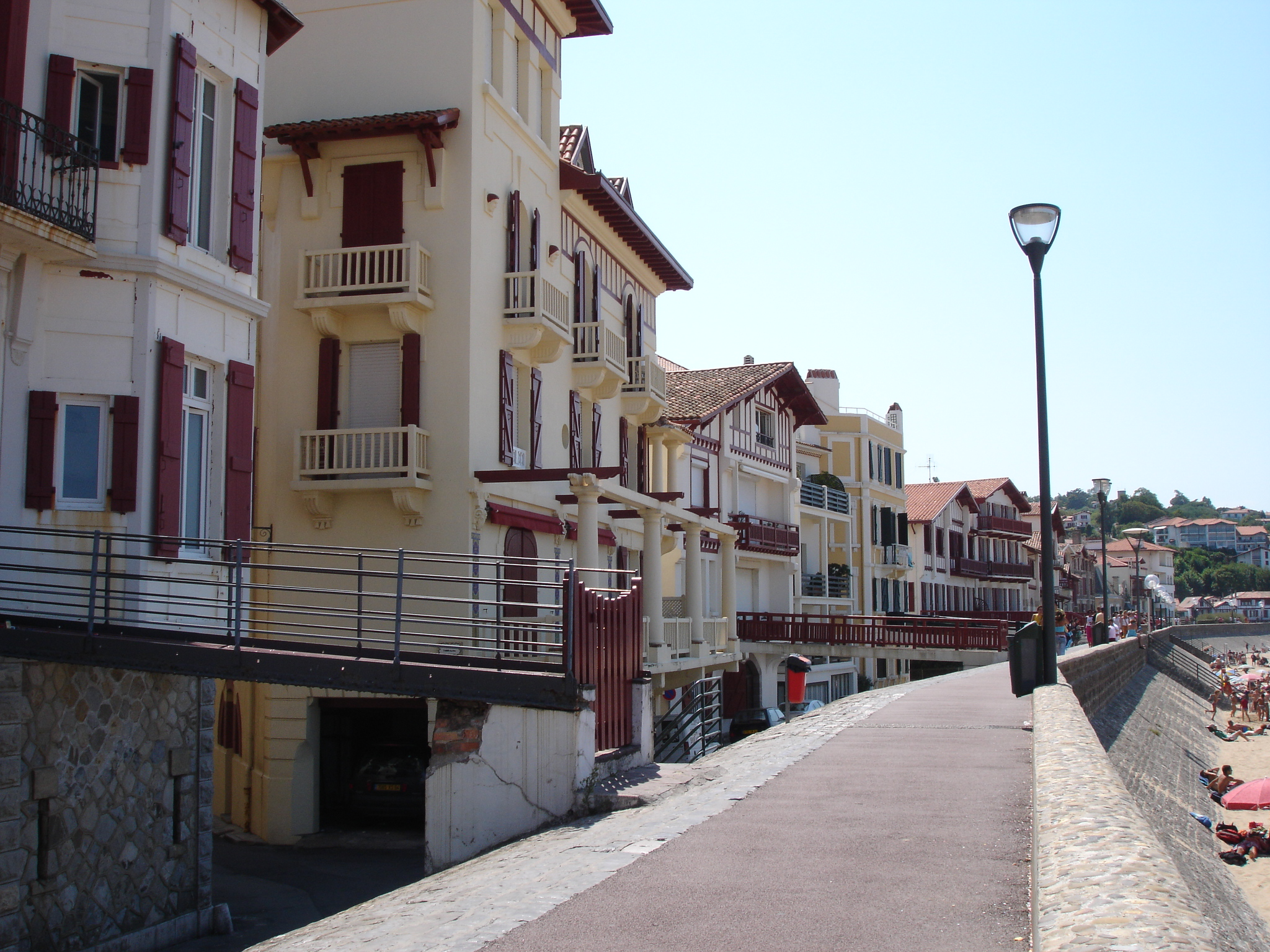
- Waterfront

- Coat of arms
- Location of Saint-Jean-de-Luz
- Location within France Location within Nouvelle-Aquitaine
- Coordinates: 43°23′N 1°40′W
- Country: France
- Region: Nouvelle-Aquitaine
- Department: Pyrénées-Atlantiques
- Arrondissement: Bayonne
- Canton: Saint-Jean-de-Luz
- Intercommunality: CA Pays Basque

Government
  - Mayor (2020–2026): Jean-François Irigoyen
- Area^{1}: 19 km^{2} (7.3 sq mi)
- Elevation: 6 m (20 ft)
- Highest elevation: 84 m (276 ft)
- Lowest elevation: 0 m (0 ft)
- Population (2023): 14,857
  - Density: 780/km^{2} (2,000/sq mi)
- Time zone: UTC+01:00 (CET)
  - Summer (DST): UTC+02:00 (CEST)
- INSEE/Postal code: 64483 /64500
- ^{1} French Land Register data, which excludes lakes, ponds, glaciers > 1 km^{2} (0.386 sq mi or 247 acres) and river estuaries.

Saint-Jean-de-Luz (French: [sɛ̃ ʒɑ̃ d(ə) lyz]; Occitan: Sent Joan de Lutz; Basque: Donibane Lohitzune, locally Donibane Lohizune [doniˈβane lohiˈs̻une]) (Note: Occitan: Sent Joan de Lus [sen ˈʒwan de ˈlys]; Spanish: San Juan de Luz.) is a commune in the Pyrénées-Atlantiques department, southwestern France. Saint-Jean-de-Luz is part of the former Basque province of Labourd (Lapurdi).

== Geography ==
Saint-Jean-de-Luz is a fishing port on the Basque coast and now a famous resort, known for its architecture, sandy bay, the quality of the light and the cuisine. The town is located south of Biarritz, on the right bank of the river Nivelle (French for Urdazuri) opposite to Ciboure. The port lies on the estuary just before the river joins the ocean. The summit of Larrun is about 8 km (5 mi) south-east of the town. The summit can be reached by the Petit train de la Rhune, which starts from the Col de Saint-Ignace, 10.5 km (6.5 mi) east of the town on the D4 road to Sare. It is in the traditional province of Lapurdi of the Basque Country.

Saint-Jean-de-Luz bay is a natural harbour in the south-east of the Bay of Biscay. It is the only sheltered bay between Arcachon and Spain. Thanks to its strong sea walls or dykes that protect the town from the full savagery of the Atlantic Ocean, it has become a favorite for bathers across the Basque Coast. Although the seaside resort is relatively recent, the port itself is centuries old, with the most prominent point in its history being the marriage in 1660 of Louis XIV and the Spanish princess Maria Teresa.

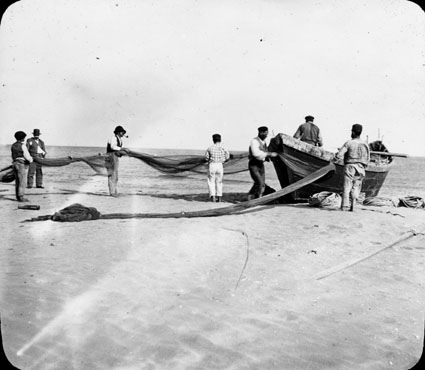
Fishermen from St Jean de Luz

Water from the area flows into the town from the Nivelle and its smaller tributaries, the Etxeberri, Isaka and Xantako streams. There is also the Basarun, and its smaller tributary the Mendi, which passes directly through Saint-Jean-de-Luz. The river has been made accessible to boats and it joins the sea by the Erromardia beach. A branch of the Uhabia, an emblematic river in the neighbouring Bidart district, and its smaller Amisola tributary, also pass to the sea through St Jean de Luz.

=== Transportation ===
Saint-Jean-de-Luz straddles Route départementale D810, the old Route nationale 10. The town can be reached from the A63 motorway, Exit 3 (Saint-Jean-de-Luz Nord) and Exit 2 (Saint-Jean-de-Luz Sud). The Saint-Jean-de-Luz-Ciboure station is served by the SNCF Bordeaux–Irun railway. Biarritz Airport is the closest airport to Saint-Jean-de-Luz.

== Etymology ==
Saint-Jean-de-Luz is the French adaptation of the Labourdine Basque Donibane Lohizune – from done 'saint', Ibane 'John' and lohi 'mud' + -z 'made of' + -une 'place of'; thus meaning 'Saint John's swamp'. It is a common misconception that Luz would be the Spanish word for 'light'.

The town is named after the frequent floodings which occurred in the area over the centuries.

== History ==
Saint-Jean-de-Luz is located on the Atlantic coast of France, just a few kilometres from the border with Spain. Its wealth stems from its port and its past, with the town being associated with both fishing, and with the capture of vessels by its own Basque corsaires, or pirates (English sailors used to call Saint-Jean-de-Luz the "Viper's Nest"). This prosperity reached its height during the 17th Century, which is still considered as the town's "Golden Age." During this period, Saint-Jean-De-Luz became the second largest town in the Labourd region with a population or around 12,000, just behind Bayonne.

=== Marriage of Louis XIV ===
Saint-Jean-de-Luz is known for its royal wedding connection. In 1659, Cardinal Mazarin spent several months in Saint-Jean-de-Luz, from where he would embark on almost daily trips to Pheasant Island in the river Bidassoa (near modern-day Hendaye) for Franco-Spanish meetings that resulted in the Treaty of the Pyrenees, one clause of which was the marriage of Louis XIV to Maria Theresa, the Infanta of Spain. Saint-Jean-de-Luz and its church were chosen to host the royal wedding on 9 June 1660. The marriage is one of the most important political marriages in history that brought an end to a bitter war. Today, visitors of the cathedral can see that the main door is bricked off. Two legends circulate this oddity: First, it has been said that the door the couple passed through was later closed to represent the closing of the troubles between France and Spain. A more popular theory among the locals is that the king, Louis XIV, ordered the door to be closed off, so no other couple could walk into the church to be married in his footsteps.

=== Peninsular War ===
The Duke of Wellington set up his winter headquarters in the town during the Peninsular War, 1813–14.

=== End of the nineteenth century ===
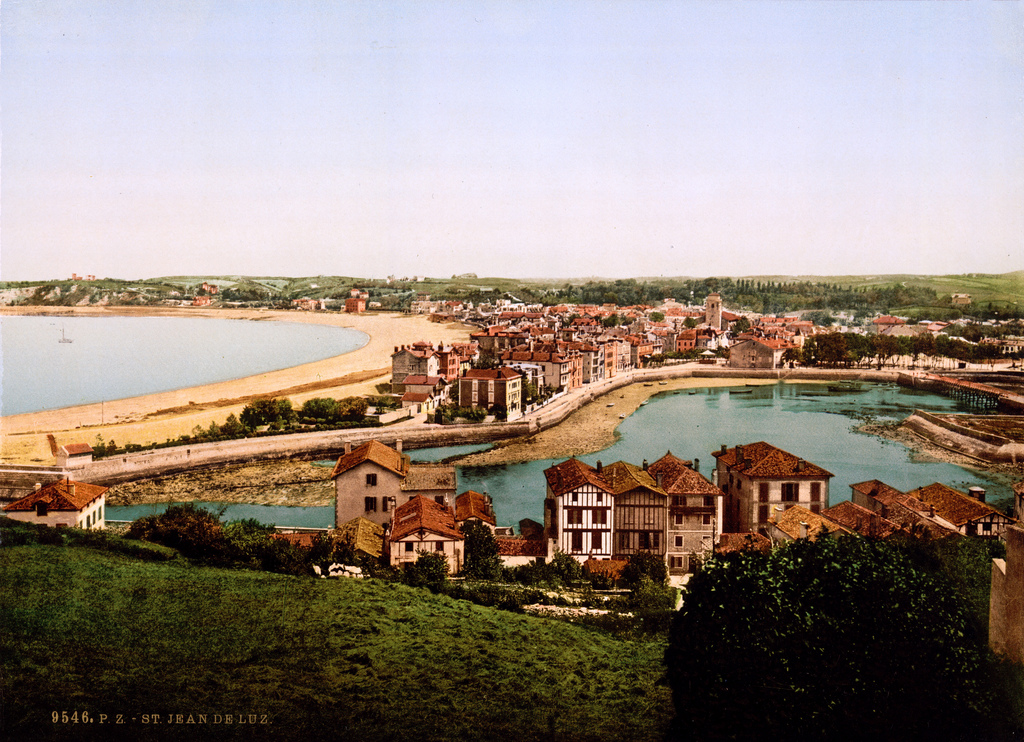
View over the town, and Ciboure (Ziburu) in the foreground, 1895

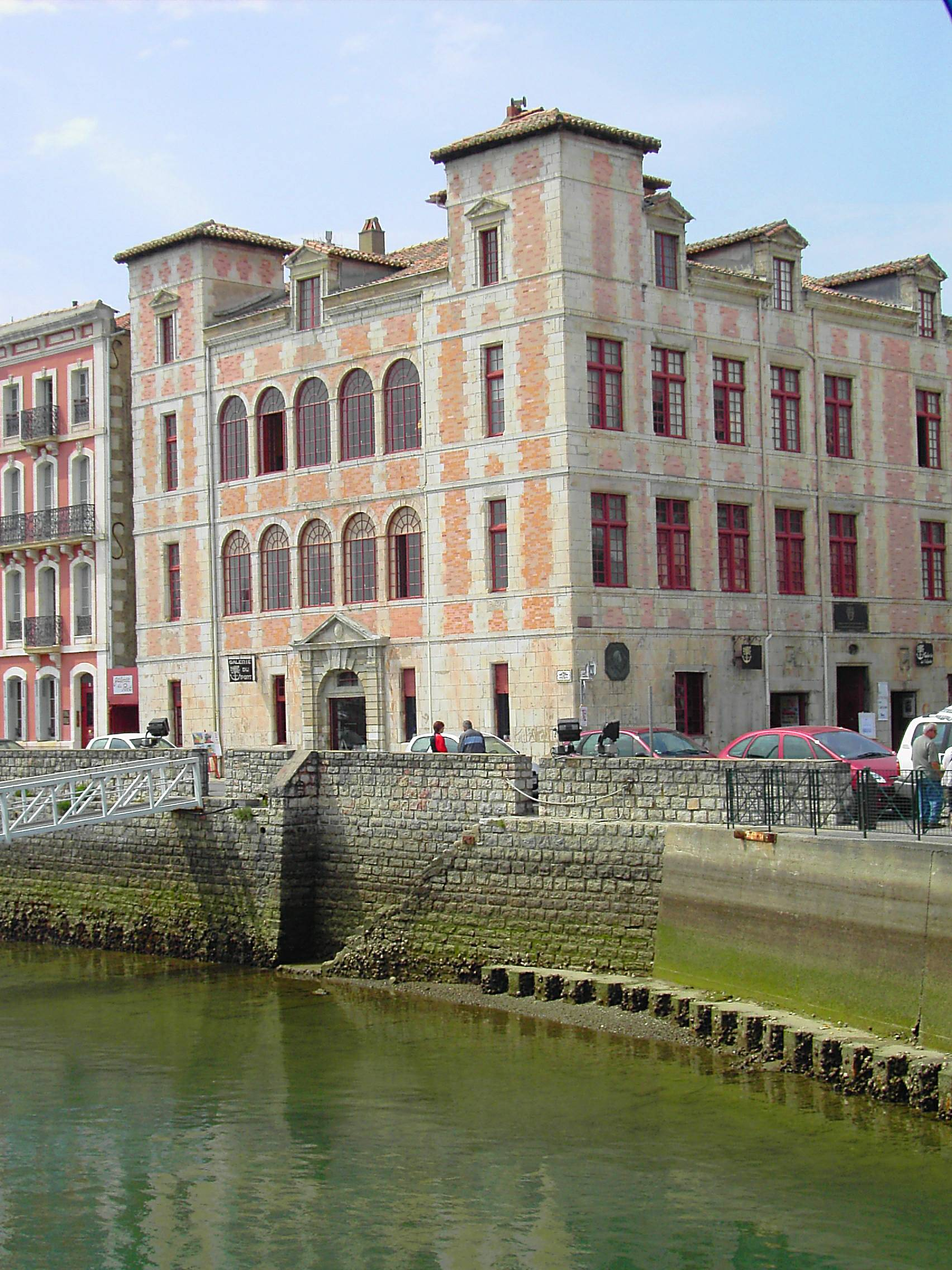
Infanta of Spain's House

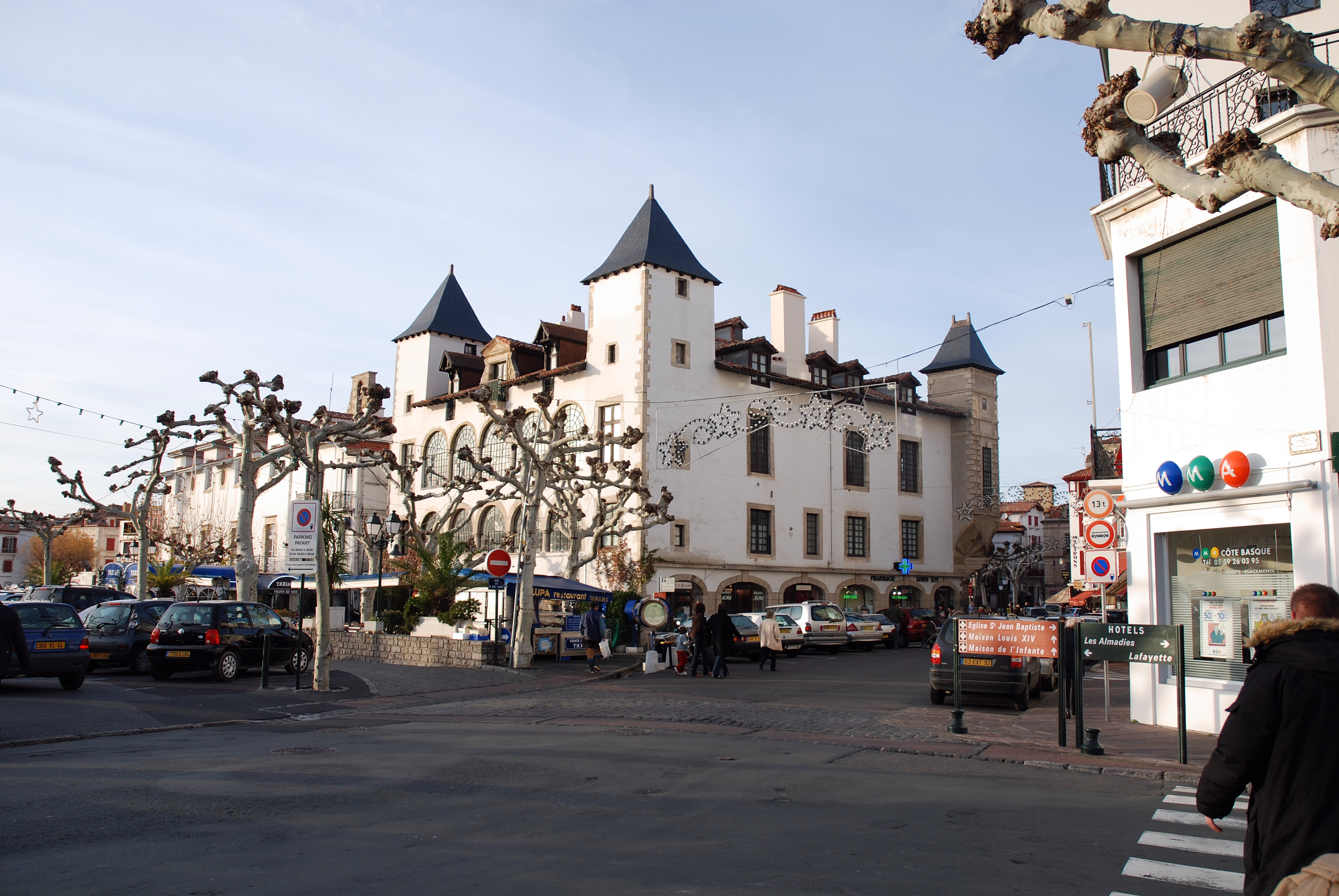
St-Jean-de Luz Town Hall

At the end of the nineteenth century, Saint-Jean-de-Luz became a popular beachside resort town for the surrounding high-society. Like Biarritz (called "The queen of the beaches, the beach of kings"), Saint-Jean-de-Luz was particularly appreciated by the French and Spanish aristocracy. By the early 1900s, it turned into the scene of Carlist conspiratorial activities. The composer Maurice Ravel, a native of the nearby town of Ciboure, frequently vacationed at Saint-Jean-de-Luz from Paris, where he was centered for almost his entire life.

Following Marshal Pétain's call for an armistice on the outset of World War II, a coastal fringe of the Basque Country fell in the German occupation area. Before the agreement was enforced, a retreating Polish Army was evacuated from the town in mid June 1940.

=== Postwar ===
After 1945, some of the traditional fishing-based industries of the Fargeot district gradually disappeared, mainly by overfishing and competition from elsewhere. The change strengthened the transformation of the town towards more luxury and tourism industries. In Saint-Jean-de-Luz over 40% of dwellings of the town are second homes.

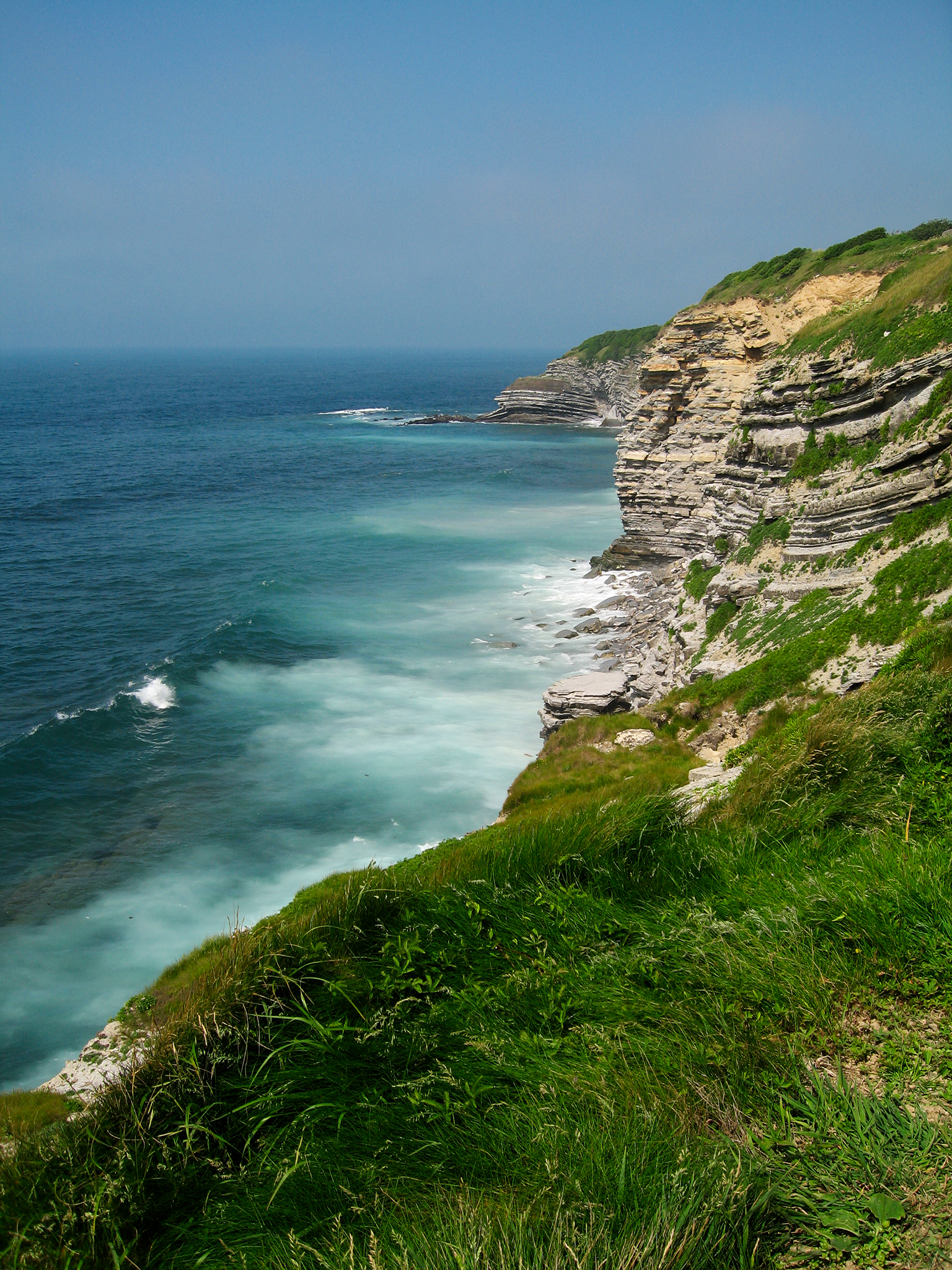
Saint-Jean-de-Luz

In the 1960s, the town expanded northwards (Avenue de l'Ocean) and also southwards in the direction of (the Urdazuri district). Since the 1970s, St Jean de Luz has been connected to Bordeaux to the north and Spain to the south by the motorway, and more recently by the TGV railway. St-Jean-de-Luz boasts extensive and attractive land and scenery, as well as a well-preserved coastline which has so far escaped urbanization. Although some of the Basque coast has seen a degree of development, the area between Fort Socoa and the Abbadia nature reserve and castle remains in its natural state.

On 22 February 2023, Agnès Lassalle, a Spanish high school teacher was killed by a 16-year-old student in the town.

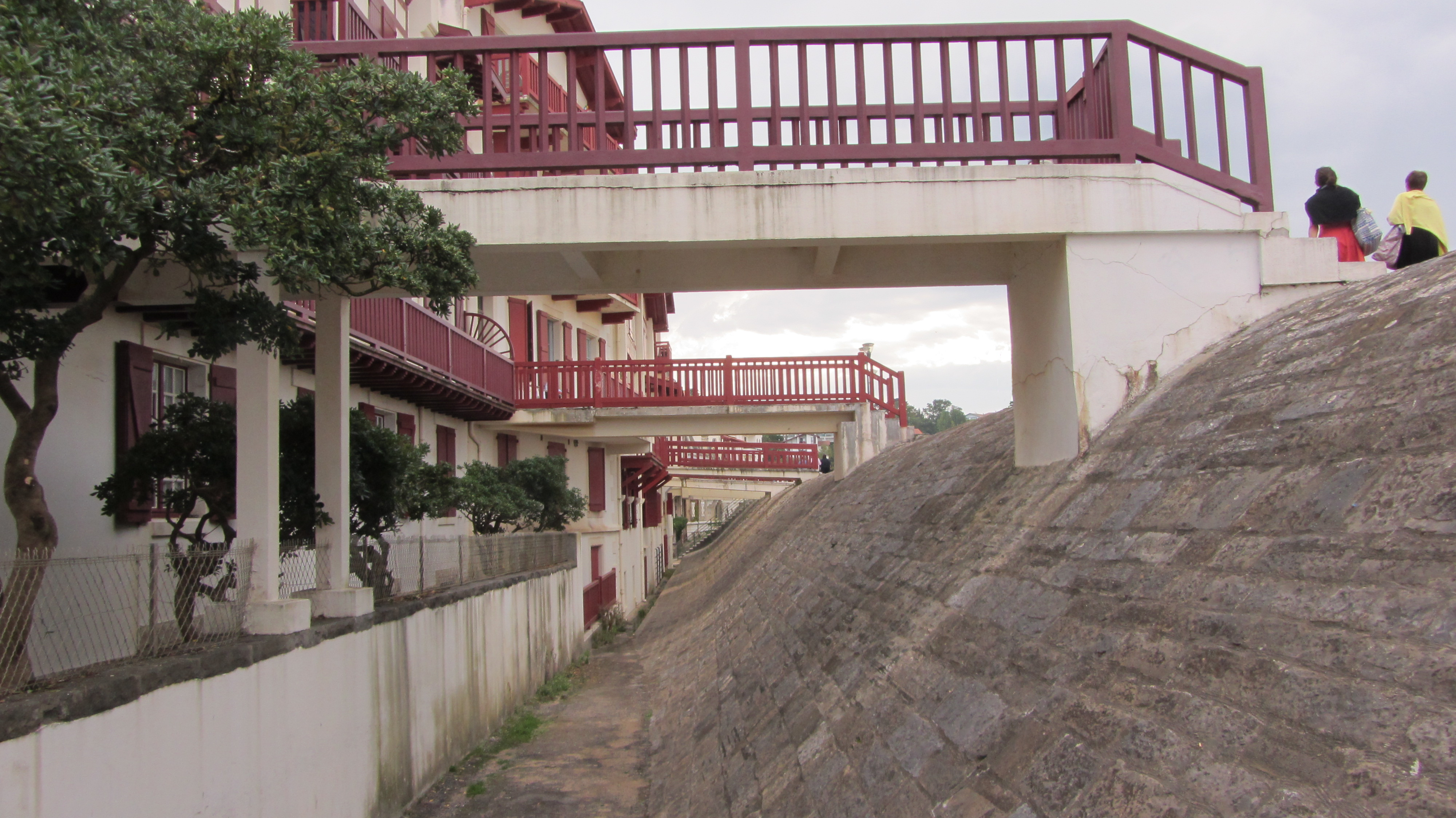
Beach housing.

== Population ==
Historical population
Year	Pop.	±% p.a.
1968	10,841	—
1975	11,854	+1.28%
1982	12,769	+1.07%
1990	13,031	+0.25%
1999	13,247	+0.18%
2007	13,728	+0.45%
2012	12,994	−1.09%
2017	14,093	+1.64%
2023	14,857	+0.88%
Source: INSEE

== Cultural heritage ==
The town features a large number of residences built in the 17th and 18th centuries along the Quai de L'Infante, Rue Mazarin, Rue Gambetta and at the Place Louis XIV. In some respects this is testament to the families, shipowners and Basque merchants from this period. One of these, built alongside the Quai de L'Infante around 1640, is called the "Maison Joanoenea", and it is here that the Queen Mother, Anne of Austria, stayed before the marriage of Louis XIV to Maria Theresa, the Infanta of Spain on 8 May 1660. The Infanta stayed there on 7 June. Locally this house is referred to as the "Maison de l'Infante", and it has become a popular tourist attraction and museum. A monument in the Verdun Square honours the memory of the fallen soldiers from World War I and World War II, and another monument on the Quai L'Infante is dedicated to the resistance movement Orion. This second plaque commemorates the importance of the work of French escape networks which helped people evade capture in Occupied France during World War II. Finally, there are some bunkers still visible along the coast. These formed part of the infamous Atlantic Wall, German defences against the anticipated Allied invasion of Westen France. Some remains are still visible on the Santa-Barbe promenade.

== Transport ==
The nearest airport is Biarritz Airport, located 17 km (11 mi) north east of Saint-Jean-de-Luz. However, other airports such as San Sebastián Airport, Bilbao Airport, Bordeaux-Mérignac Airport, and Pau Pyrénées Airport are also fairly used by air travellers from the town.

== Tourism ==
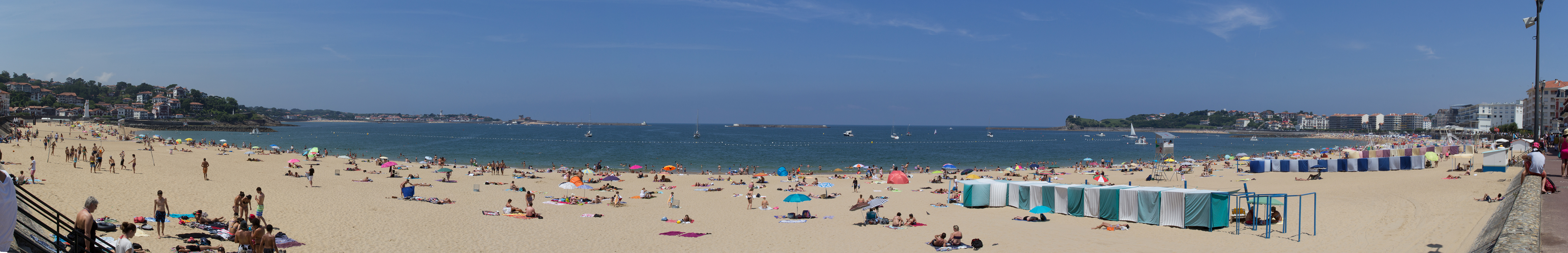
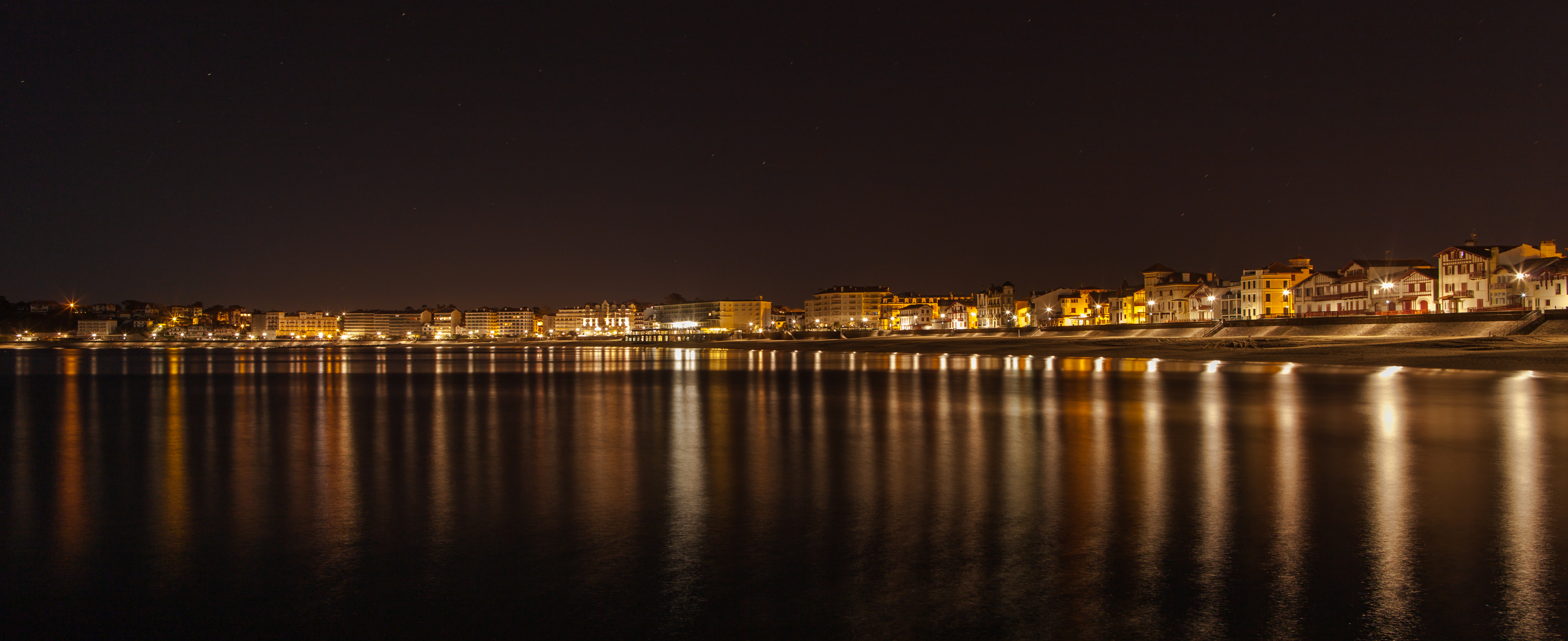
Saint-Jean-de-Luz Panorama

Nowadays, St-Jean-de-Luz depends strongly on tourism with safe clean beaches, notable high quality hotels and a seawater spa, swimming pools, a casino, golf courses and a conference centre that is under construction. The town also benefits from regional tourism, with many attracted by the pedestrian area full of shops open all year round. It also attracts a large number of visitors from Basque Country, Spain, or Gipuzkoa along with many from nearby Bayonne and the rest of southwestern France. The city is particularly attractive to retired people, many of whom come to settle there from other areas across France.

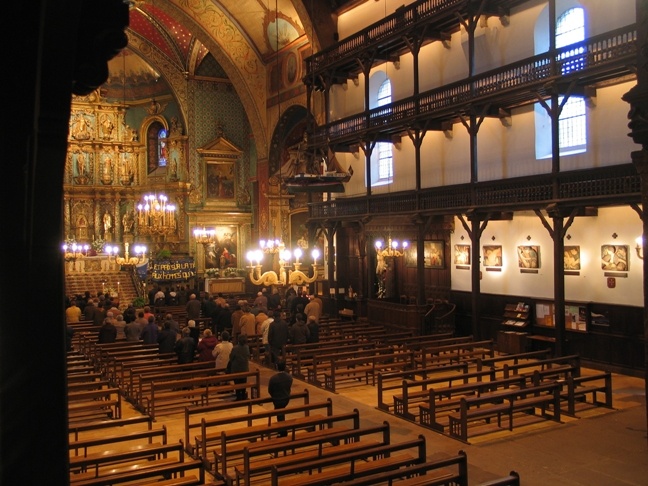
Church of St. John the Baptist

Many cultural and sporting events are held throughout the year. There are internships and public concerts of classical music organized by the Académie Ravel, usually in the auditorium of the same name. There is a film festival dedicated to young filmmakers, a surfing film festival and Basque Pelota championships.

== The tradition of the Basque ‘Trials of Strength' ==
The origin of Basque Trials of Strength is found in the daily tasks carried out across the region. For centuries, young Basque farmers pitted themselves against each other in physical challenges. Labouring in the forests of the Basque country gave rise to the challenge known as aizkolariak (based on lumberjacks working with an ax or arpanariak), as well as athletic sawing of tree stumps and wood. The construction of buildings, often based on large stones for the cathedrals and monasteries led to the development of the challenge known as arrijasotzaileak – literally those who lift stones.

Several events originate from working in the fields, the best known of which is lastoaltxatzea, the lifting of straw bales. This is done either using a pitchfork or a pulley, and is often organized in tandem with joko (cart-lifting), zakulasterka (individual relay or sack races), and untziketariak, a race involving pitchers of milk. Also well-known is soka-shot, or tug-of-war, which is an internationally recognised discipline celebrated in fourteen countries. During the summer, demonstrations of Force Basque are organised by the local Xiste organization, often at the main municipal arena in Saint-Jean-de-Luz.

== Carnivals, festivals, and events ==
- Basque carnival of Ihauteriak held in February
- Weekend Andalusian festival of Pentecost
- Festival of Saint Jean, patron saint of the city, held end of June
- Tuna Festival held second Saturday of July along with the Amateur Tuna Festival
- Sardine Night Festival – end of July and into August
- Since 1953, the local Basque Yacht Club has organised an international Amateur Tuna Fishing Championship in August
- Classical Music of the Basque Coast Festival in September with concerts and free master classes
- Maurice Ravel International Academy of Music holds classes in first half of September
- Rue de la République Festival organised by local merchants, third weekend in September
- Young International Film Directors Festival each October
- International Basque Choral Singing Festival Festival around Halloween (1 November)

== Climate ==
Climate data for Saint-Jean-de-Luz (Socoa) 1981–2010 averages, records 1921–present
Month	Jan	Feb	Mar	Apr	May	Jun	Jul	Aug	Sep	Oct	Nov	Dec	Year
Record high °C (°F)	24.6 (76.3)	28.4 (83.1)	29.8 (85.6)	32.5 (90.5)	35.4 (95.7)	39.0 (102.2)	39.2 (102.6)	40.2 (104.4)	38.0 (100.4)	33.2 (91.8)	29.0 (84.2)	26.0 (78.8)	40.2 (104.4)
Mean daily maximum °C (°F)	12.8 (55.0)	13.4 (56.1)	15.4 (59.7)	16.5 (61.7)	19.5 (67.1)	22.0 (71.6)	24.2 (75.6)	24.8 (76.6)	23.4 (74.1)	20.6 (69.1)	16.0 (60.8)	13.4 (56.1)	18.5 (65.3)
Daily mean °C (°F)	9.3 (48.7)	9.6 (49.3)	11.4 (52.5)	12.6 (54.7)	15.7 (60.3)	18.3 (64.9)	20.5 (68.9)	21.0 (69.8)	19.1 (66.4)	16.6 (61.9)	12.3 (54.1)	10.0 (50.0)	14.7 (58.5)
Mean daily minimum °C (°F)	5.8 (42.4)	5.9 (42.6)	7.4 (45.3)	8.6 (47.5)	11.8 (53.2)	14.7 (58.5)	16.8 (62.2)	17.2 (63.0)	14.9 (58.8)	12.6 (54.7)	8.7 (47.7)	6.5 (43.7)	10.9 (51.6)
Record low °C (°F)	−10.8 (12.6)	−12 (10)	−7.2 (19.0)	−2.4 (27.7)	2.6 (36.7)	4.2 (39.6)	6.4 (43.5)	7.2 (45.0)	2.2 (36.0)	0.5 (32.9)	−5.6 (21.9)	−8 (18)	−12 (10)
Average precipitation mm (inches)	139.0 (5.47)	116.9 (4.60)	110.9 (4.37)	137.0 (5.39)	115.1 (4.53)	86.4 (3.40)	70.1 (2.76)	99.6 (3.92)	118.0 (4.65)	152.6 (6.01)	182.0 (7.17)	155.4 (6.12)	1,483 (58.39)
Average precipitation days (≥ 1.0 mm)	13.4	11.9	12.3	14.0	12.4	10.5	8.6	9.8	9.7	12.2	13.1	12.5	140.4
Source: Météo France

== Notable people ==
18th century

- Joachim Labrouche, born 1769 in Hendaye died 1853 in Saint-Jean-de-Luz, French political figure;

19th century

- John O'Byrne, Count O'Byrne, born 1834, died 1905 in Saint-Jean-de-Luz;
- Tirso de Olazábal y Lardizábal, Count of Arbelaiz, born 1842 in Irun, died 1921 in San Sebastián, a Spanish Carlist politician;
- Ernest William Hornung, born 1866 in Middlesbrough (UK) died in 1921 in Saint-Jean-de-Luz, a British writer;
- Feodor Chaliapin, born 1873 in Kazan in Russia died in Paris in 1938, a famous singer who owned a villa in Sainte-Barbe;
- Maurice Ravel, born 1875 in the nearby town of Ciboure, was a world-renowned composer who frequently visited Saint-Jean-de-Luz throughout his life
- Jesús Fernández Duro, born 1878 in La Felguera (Spain), died 1906 in Saint-Jean-de-Luz, noted flyer, received the Chevalier de la Légion d'Honneur
- Pierre Etchebaster, born 1893 in Saint-Jean-de-Luz died 1980, seven times Real Tennis World Champion;
- Louis Paulhan, born 1883 in Pézenas died 1963 in Saint-Jean-de-Luz, a French aviation pioneer;
- Jean Sébédio, born 1890 in Saint-Jean-de-Luz died 1951 in Carcassonne, French rugby player who played for Tarbes and the French national side
- André Pavlovsky, born 1891 in Paris died 1961 in Saint-Jean-de-Luz, was a famous French architect;
- Ramiro Arrue, born 1892 in Bilbao (Spain) died 1971 in Saint-Jean-de-Luz, a painter, illustrator, and ceramic designer whose work celebrated Basque culture;

20th century

- Julio Urquijo Ibarra, born 1871 in Deusto died 1950 in San Sebastián, Basque linguist
- René Lacoste, born 1904 in Paris died 1996 à Saint-Jean-de-Luz, French tennis champion;
- José Antonio Aguirre, born 1904 in Bilbao, died 1960 in Paris buried in Saint-Jean-de-Luz, leading Basque politician and political figure;
- William Biehn, born Metz in 1911 and died in Saint-Jean-de-Luz in 1997 a painter specialising in Orientalist art;
- Michel Etcheverry, born 1919 in Saint-Jean-de-Luz died 1999 in Paris, French actor;
- Jean Diharce, born 1920 in Saint-Jean-de-Luz, a Basque poet with the pseudonym Iratzeder
- Marie Sabouret, born 1924 in La Rochelle died 1960 in Saint-Jean-de-Luz, a French actress
- Franz Duboscq, born 1924 in Saint-Jean-de-Luz, French politician
- Jacques Pavlovsky, born 1931 in Saint-Jean-de-Luz, a French photographer
- Charles Ducasse, born 1932 in Saint-Jean-de-Luz, a French footballer;
- Philippe Ogouz, born 1939 in Saint-Jean-de-Luz, died 2019 in Paris, French actor and director
- Miguel Boyer, born 1939 in Saint-Jean-de-Luz, economist and Spanish politician
- Michèle Alliot-Marie, born 1946 in Villeneuve-le-Roi, French politician who was Mayor of Saint-Jean-de-Luz from 1995 to 2002;
- André Darrieussecq, born 1947 in Saint-Jean-de-Luz, a French rugby player who played for Saint-Jean-de-Luz Olympique Rugby and the French national side;
- Sophie Audouin-Mamikonian, born 1961 in Saint-Jean-de-Luz, author of the famous French book series about heroine Tara Duncan, followed by young people and translated into many languages;
- Jean-Marie Ecay, born 1962 in Saint-Jean-de-Luz, guitarist;
- Laurence Ostolaza, born 1967 in Saint-Jean-de-Luz, television journalist
- Zacarias Moussaoui (born 1968), terrorist convicted in September 11 attacks
- Bixente Lizarazu, born 1969 in Saint-Jean-de-Luz, French footballer and a winner of a World Cup with the French national side in 1998;
- Anne-Sophie Lapix, born 1972 in Saint-Jean-de-Luz, French journalist, news anchor, and television presenter
- Sandrine Mendiburu, born 1973 in Saint-Jean-de-Luz, professional golfer
- Frédéric Aranzueque-Arrieta, born 1975 in Saint-Jean-de-Luz, author and essayist writing about Franco-Spanish affairs;
- Yoan Anthian, born 1979 in Saint-Jean-de-Luz, a rugby player who has represented the Armenian national side;
- Patxi Garat, born 1981 in Saint-Jean-de-Luz, a French author, writer and performer discovered on the French TV version of Star Academy

== Points of interest ==
- Jardin botanique littoral Paul Jovet
- Église Saint-Jean-Baptiste de Saint-Jean-de-Luz

== See also ==
- Communes of the Pyrénées-Atlantiques department
- The works of Maxime Real del Sarte
