= MS Sobieski =

Polish passenger ship launched in 1939

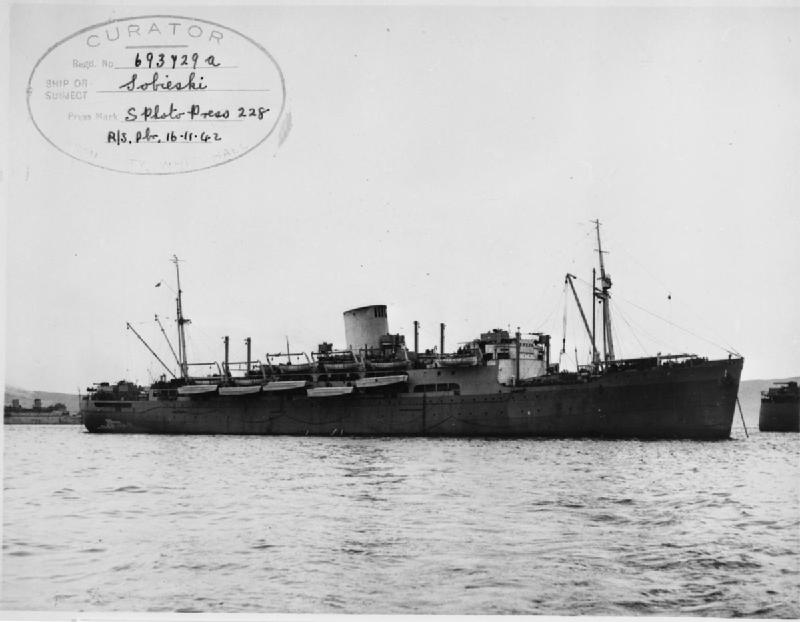
- HMS Sobieski in wartime service

History
- Name: Sobieski
- Namesake: King Jan III Sobieski
- Owner: Gdynia-America Line – GAL
- Port of registry: 1939–1950: Gdynia, Poland; 1950–1975: Odessa, Soviet Union
- Route: South America service
- Builder: Swan, Hunter and Wigham Richardson, Wallsend.
- Launched: 25 August 1938
- Completed: 15 June 1939
- Maiden voyage: 15 June 1939
- Out of service: 1939 taken up as troopship
- Identification: Call sign: UPOV; IMO number: 5136866
- Fate: 1975 scrapped at La Spezia
- Notes: 1947 returned to civilian service; 1950 sold to Russia renamed Gruziya

General characteristics
- Tonnage: 11,030 GRT
- Length: 155.85 m (511 ft 4 in)
- Beam: 20.41 m (67 ft 0 in)
- Draft: 8.30 m (27 ft 3 in)
- Installed power: Engines by J. G. Kincaid & Co, Greenock
- Propulsion: 2 × screws; 2 × two-stroke diesel engines
- Speed: 17 knots (31 km/h)
- Capacity: 44 first-class, 250 third-class and 850 emigrants

MS Sobieski was a Polish passenger ship launched in 1939. It was constructed for the South American service of the Gdynia-America Line – GAL to replace the aging SS Kościuszko and SS Pulaski. She was named in honour of the Polish king Jan III Sobieski. Sobieski was to be a sister ship to the MS Chrobry.

== Maiden voyage ==
Sobieski only managed one journey before the war, arriving in Buenos Aires on the 10th of July 1939.

== Wartime service ==
The ship was used as a troopship in the Allied evacuation of western France in 1940 (Operation Aerial), where she was one of the last ships to leave St Jean de Luz during the final evacuation of Polish troops from France, and in the Battle of Dakar. During Operation Streamline Jane, the invasion of Madagascar, in May, 1942, Sobieski was the flag ship.

She was also used to transport the British 18th Division to the defence of Singapore.

== Post-war ==
At the end of the war she repatriated the remnants of that division's Cambridgeshire Regiment that had survived captivity at the hands of the Japanese in Malaya and Thailand. She also returned former Changi prisoners of war (POWs) from Singapore, sailing via Cape Town and docking at Liverpool during a dockworkers' strike. Disgusted, dismayed ex-POWs had to unload their own baggage, such as it was.

Between 1947 and 1950, Sobieski sailed on the Genoa – Halifax – New York route, under the Polish flag.

The vessel was sold to Russia in 1950 and renamed Gruziya and scrapped in Italy in 1975.

== Pictures ==
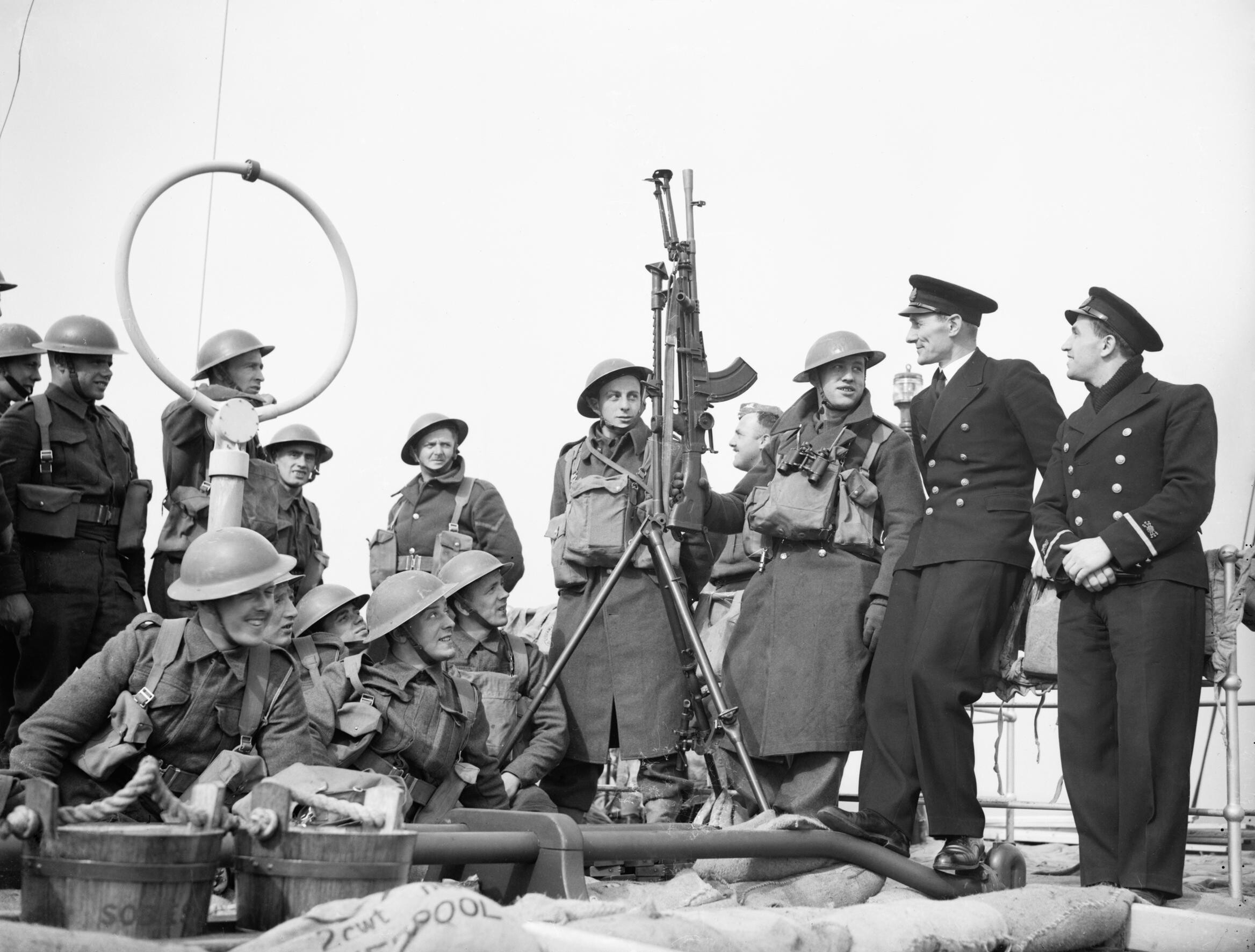
Duke of Wellington's Regiment aboard Sobieski on route to Norway, 20 April 1940

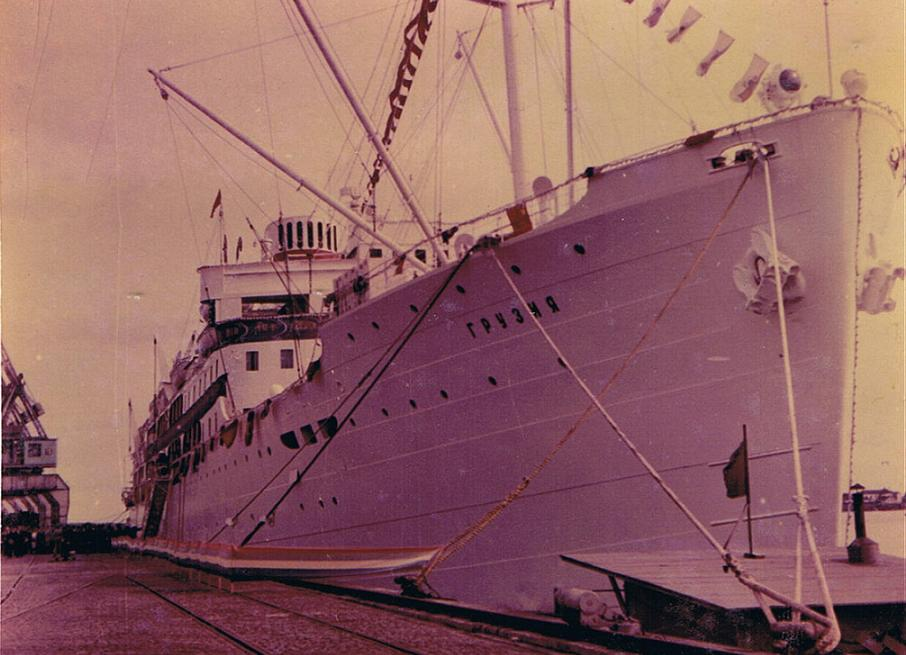
Gruziya, the former Sobieski, in Helsinki
