= Evacuation of the Polish Army from Saint-Jean-de-Luz =

The evacuation of the Polish Army from Saint-Jean-de-Luz took place in June 1940 during the Second World War following their fight in the Battle of France, where 55,000 men of the Polish Army in France had fought.

After the French Marshal Pétain's call for an armistice and demobilisation on 16 June the Poles had fought on, until on 19 June Polish Commander-in-Chief General Władysław Sikorski ordered all units to withdraw to the coast to seek evacuation to the United Kingdom as part of Operation Aerial. Units unable to get on ships trying to leave Saint-Nazaire made a fighting retreat south to Saint-Jean-de-Luz, where they flocked onto the beach and the pier in the fishing port.

The Gdynia-America Line passenger ships Batory and Sobieski anchored in the harbour, where local fishermen volunteered to ferry the soldiers out to them. The sea was rough and the fishing boats had difficulty approaching the side of these ships to enable the men to transfer without falling into the water. It is reported that women and children were helped aboard by sailors. Diplomats and officials of the Polish Ministry of Foreign Affairs also embarked on these ships, and some French who had been inspired by General De Gaulle's appeal of 18 June to continue the struggle against Germany. The ships sailed early on 21 June and the Senior Naval Officer reported that 9,000 Polish troops were loaded on these two ships.

We know in detail the various movements of ships through the logs that have been preserved. Sobieski was at the mouth of the Gironde river on 20 June, and arrived in Saint-Jean-de-Luz harbour on the night of 20–21 June where she immediately embarked evacuees. Batory reached the mouth of the Adour at 0700 hrs on 21 June and then began an approach to enter the port of Bayonne without anchor. However, on the recommendation of a British liaison officer, she then went to Saint-Jean-de-Luz, where troops and Polish civilian refugees were gathered. The French soldier, writer and later politician Maurice Schumann was among those who embarked on her.

The Ettrick arrived on 23 June and embarked about 1,100 British refugees and 300 Poles. The British liner Arandora Star also arrived in Saint-Jean-de-Luz, where she embarked about 3,000 troops and refugees including most of the Polish Staff and took them to Liverpool. Bad weather and low clouds prevented a Luftwaffe attack and hence another disaster like the sinking on 17 June of the British liner RMS Lancastria at Saint-Nazaire, which was laden with thousands of troops and refugees as part of Operation Aerial. Arandora Star got out of Saint-Jean-de-Luz just in time before a Luftwaffe bomber attack on the town and port began. Ettrick and Arandora Star sailed with escort provided by HMS Harvester (H19)

A total of 24,352 Polish troops managed to evacuate France by the armistice deadline of 25 June, in total. One of the last evacuees was Sir Ronald Hugh Campbell, the British Ambassador to France.

== See also ==
- World War II in the Basque Country
