= Jacques Pavlovsky =

French photojournalist (1931–2023)

- Born: 1931; Saint-Jean-de-Luz, France
- Died: 15 October 2023 (aged 92); Urrugne, France
- Education: Beaux-Arts de Paris
- Occupation: Photojournalist

Jacques Pavlovsky (1931 – 15 October 2023) was a French photojournalist.

== Biography ==
Born in Saint-Jean-de-Luz in 1931, Jacques was the son of architect André Pavlovsky and Yvonne Longi. He studied at the Beaux-Arts de Paris and subsequently the École de photographie et de cinéma. After serving in the Algerian War, he moved to Paris and joined the Rapho news agency, directed by Raymond Grosset. During this time, he began to pursue press photography within the agency, covering French politics, May 68, the death of Charles de Gaulle, and the election of Georges Pompidou.

In April 1974, Pavlovsky joined the Sygma photo agency at the invitation of Hubert Henrotte. He met numerous popular reporters at this time, such as Henri Bureau, Alain Keler, Alain Noguès, Jean-Pierre Laffont, William Karel, Patrick Robert, and Philippe Ledru. He notably reported on the Fall of Saigon, the death of Francisco Franco, the accession of Juan Carlos I, the inauguration of Saddam Hussein, and the Iran–Iraq War. His reports were published in Newsweek, The Times, and Paris Match.

Jacques Pavlovsky died in Urrugne on 15 October 2023, at the age of 92.

== Publications ==
- Architectures d'André Pavlovsky - La côte basque des années trente
- Pottoka, le petit cheval basque
- Les animaux de Pays basque, vautours, pottok, moutons manex, betisoak
- Regardez les danser
- Objets et saveurs du Pays basque
