= Charles Ducasse =

French footballer (1930–1983)

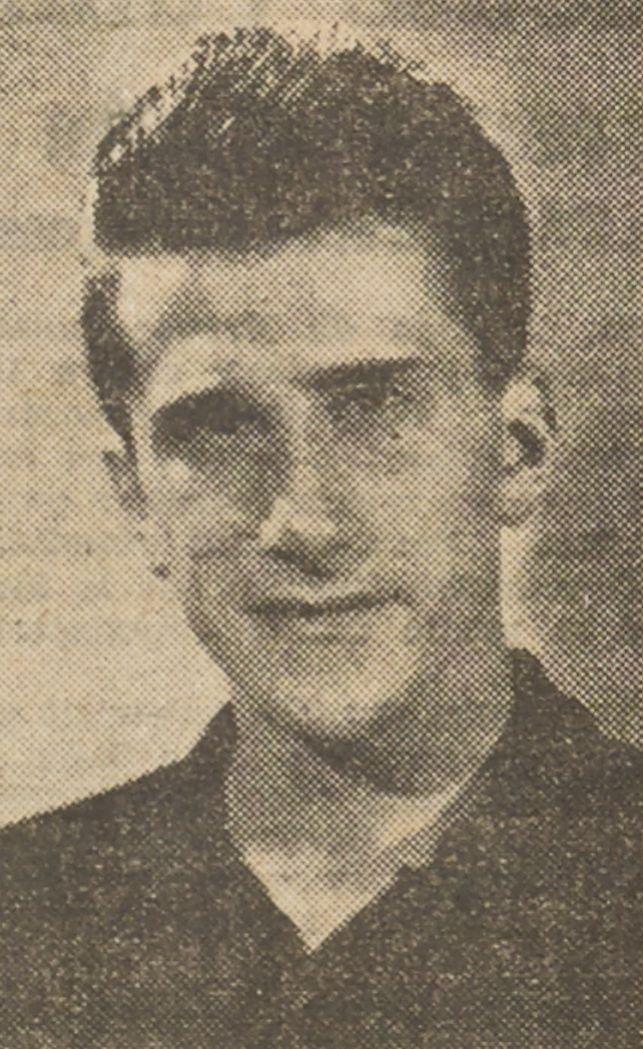

Personal information
- Full name: Charles Jean Jacques Ducasse
- Date of birth: 1 May 1930
- Place of birth: Saint-Jean de Luz, France
- Date of death: 26 October 1983 (aged 53)
- Place of death: Bayonne, France
- Position: Midfielder

Senior career*
Years	Team	Apps	(Gls)
- Arin Luzien
- Stade Français
- Bordeaux
- Arin Luzien
1952–1953	Real Sociedad	18	(8)
1953–1957	Real Valladolid	68	(14)
1957	Marseille	10	(3)
1957–1958	Alès		
- * Club domestic league appearances and goals

Charles Ducasse, known in Spain as Carlos Ducasse (1 May 1930 in Saint-Jean de Luz – 26 October 1983 in Bayonne), was a French footballer. He mostly played for Spanish clubs—one year with Real Sociedad and four years with Real Valladolid.
