= Etcharry =

Etcharry Etxarri
- Commune
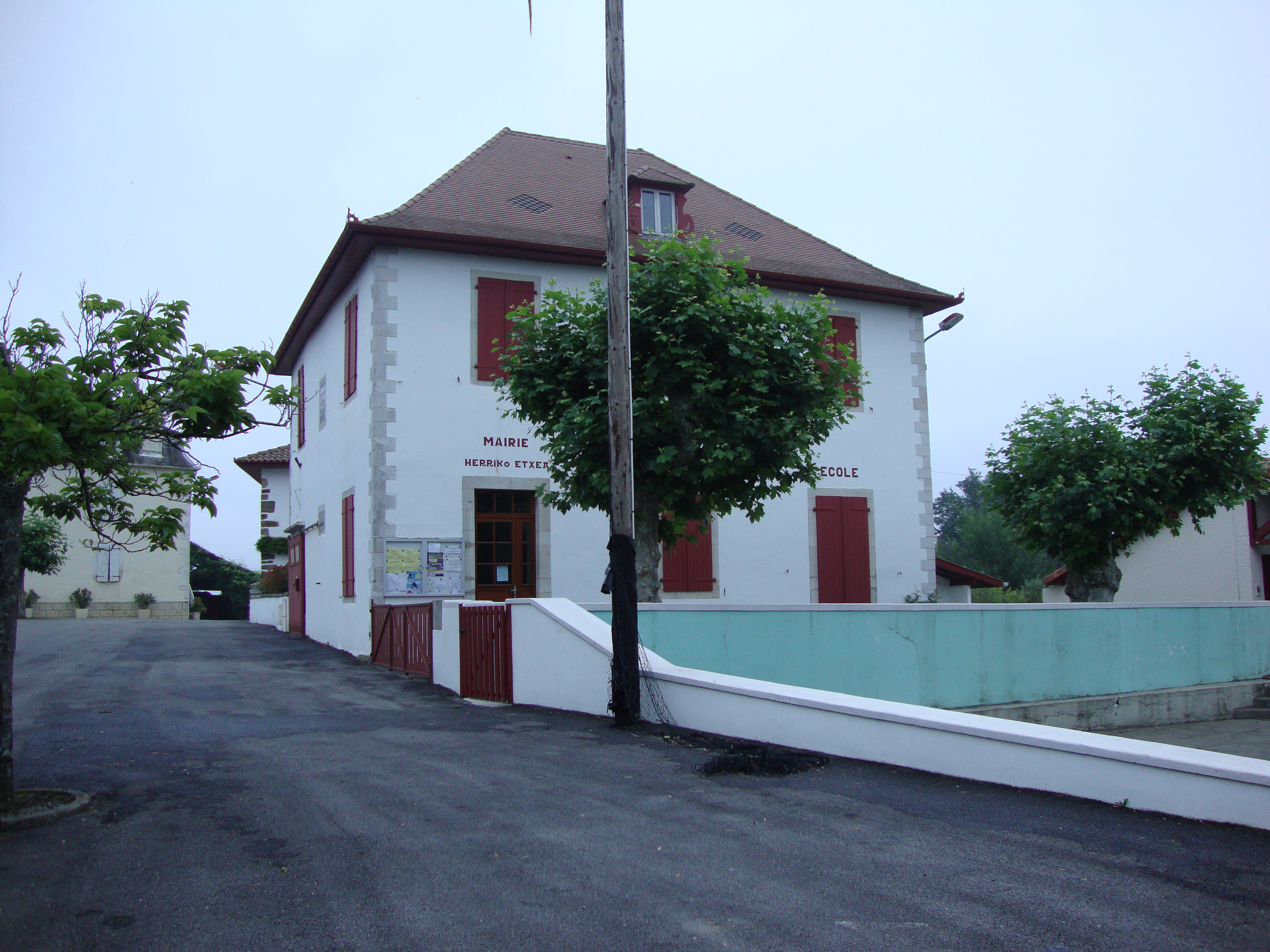
- The town hall and school of Etcharry
- Location of Etcharry
- Location within France Location within Nouvelle-Aquitaine
- Coordinates: 43°19′28″N 0°55′37″W
- Country: France
- Region: Nouvelle-Aquitaine
- Department: Pyrénées-Atlantiques
- Arrondissement: Bayonne
- Canton: Pays de Bidache, Amikuze et Ostibarre
- Intercommunality: CA Pays Basque

Government
  - Mayor (2020–2026): Bernard Casabonne
- Area^{1}: 7.43 km^{2} (2.87 sq mi)
- Elevation: 132 m (433 ft)
- Highest elevation: 227 m (745 ft)
- Lowest elevation: 86 m (282 ft)
- Population (2023): 144
  - Density: 19.4/km^{2} (50.2/sq mi)
- Time zone: UTC+01:00 (CET)
  - Summer (DST): UTC+02:00 (CEST)
- INSEE/Postal code: 64221 /64120
- ^{1} French Land Register data, which excludes lakes, ponds, glaciers > 1 km^{2} (0.386 sq mi or 247 acres) and river estuaries.

Etcharry (French pronunciation: [etʃaʁi]; Basque: Etxarri) is a commune in the Pyrénées-Atlantiques department in south-western France.

It is located in the former province of Soule.

== See also ==
- Communes of the Pyrénées-Atlantiques department
