= André Darrieussecq =

French rugby union player (1947–2020)

- Born: 4 June 1947 Saint-Jean-de-Luz, France
- Died: 31 July 2020 (aged 73)
- Height: 1.80 m (5 ft 11 in)

Rugby union career
- Position: Prop
Senior career
Years	Team	Apps	(Points)
- Saint-Jean-de-Luz Olympique
1968–1977	Biarritz Olympique		
- Stade Français
International career
Years	Team	Apps	(Points)
1973	France		

André Darrieussecq (4 June 1947 – 31 July 2020) was a French rugby union player who played in the prop position.

== Biography ==
Darrieussecq began his career with his hometown team, Saint-Jean-de-Luz Olympique. From 1968 to 1977, he played with Biarritz Olympique. He was also selected for the French national team during the 1973 Six Nations Championship. He played one game on 24 February 1973 against England.

André Darrieussecq died on 31 July 2020 at the age of 73.
