= World War II in the Basque Country =

Hitler and Franco during Meeting at Hendaye (23 October 1940)

World War II in the Basque Country (a region in northern Spain and southwestern France) refers to the period extending from 1940 to 1945. It affected the French Basque Country (a region in southwest France), but also bordering areas across the Pyrenees on account of the instability following the end of the Spanish Civil War, and the friendly ties between Germany, Vichy France, and the triumphant Spanish military dictatorship.

== Fallout of the Spanish Civil War ==
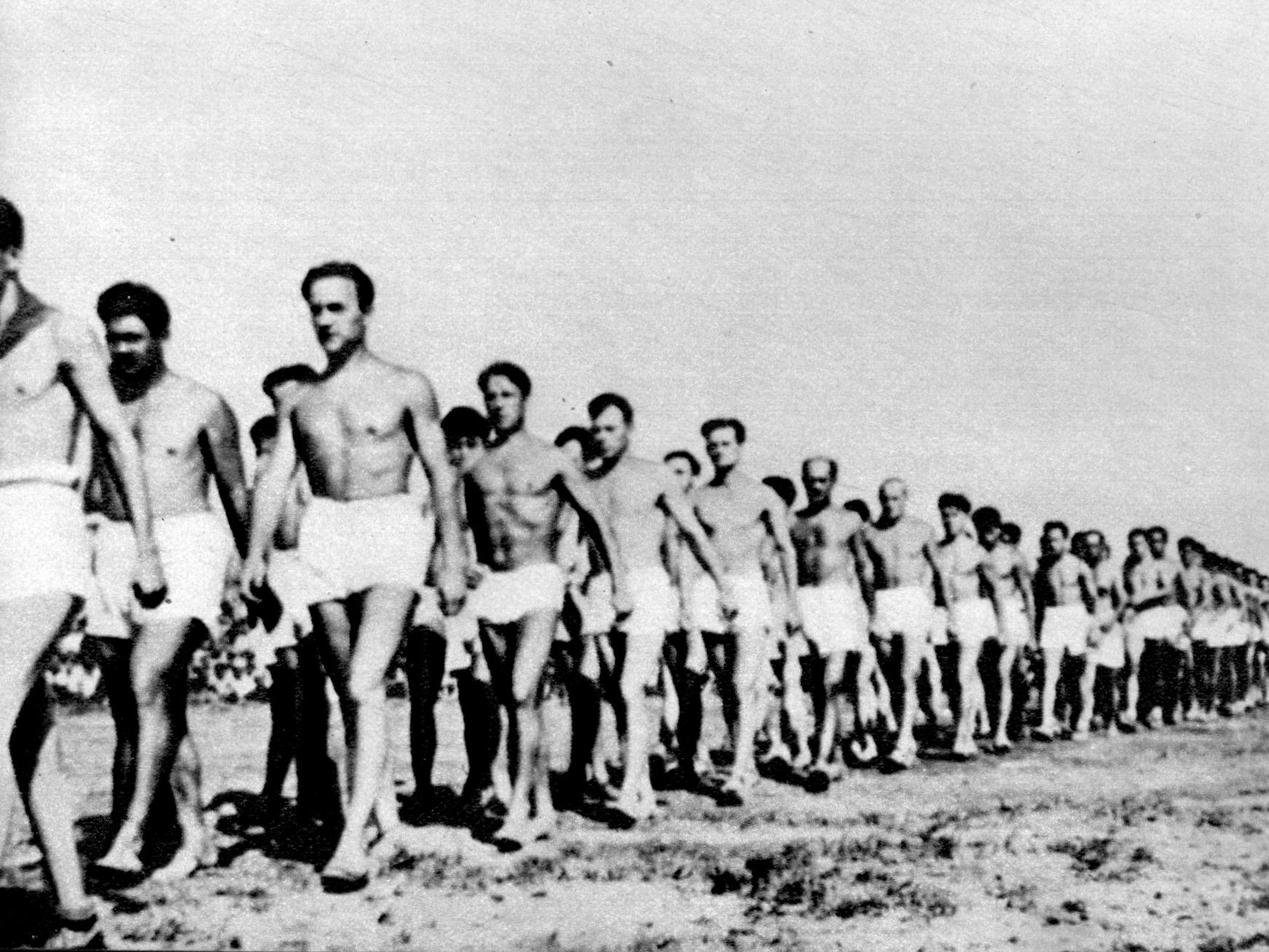
Inmates in Gurs internment camp (1939)

In June 1937, the Northern Front of the Spanish Civil War collapsed for the Republicans. Approximately half a million Republicans and civilians fled to France for their lives in Spain, but possibly up to 150,000 of them were Basques, an extraordinary proportion in the overall account. Some of them, including many gudaris, crossed the border to the Labourd. They were confined next to Bayonne, while the French government set about constructing internment camps at the feet of the northern Pyrenees aimed at sheltering the civilians and Republicans fleeing from the Basque front, as well as Catalonia, stranded in Roussillon. Next to Gurs (outer fringes of Soule, in Bearn), an internment camp was established in Mars-April 1939. It lasted up to 1945.

The population's reception to the Spanish refugees, perceived as 'reds', was generally negative, since the Bearnese and the Basques stuck to a traditionalist mindset, spearheaded in the Basque area by Ybarnegaray, prominent former sports personality and deputy from Lower Navarre. Jean Ybarnegaray appealed to the instinctively cautious nature of his rural constituency, warning against a consciously Basque political culture, as the one promoted by Basque Nationalist Party. Only Oloron (bordering on Soule), with a leftist council, showed active support to the exiles from the Spanish Civil War.

== Outbreak of World War II ==
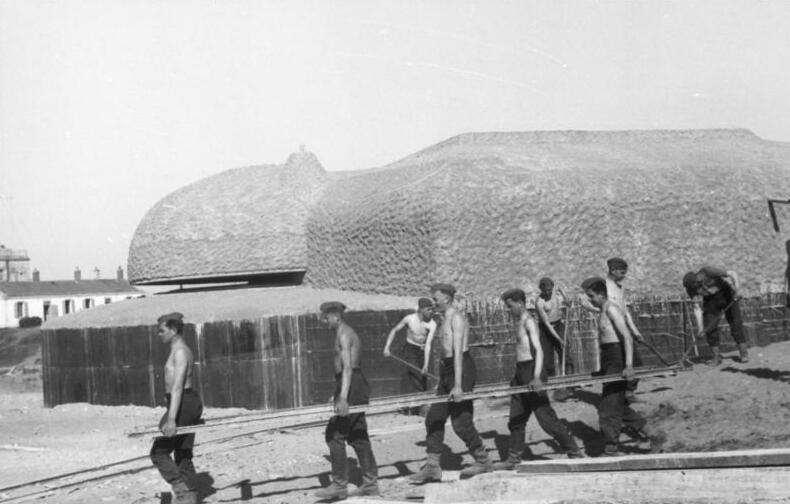
Construction of the Atlantic Wall somewhere near Hendaye, 1942

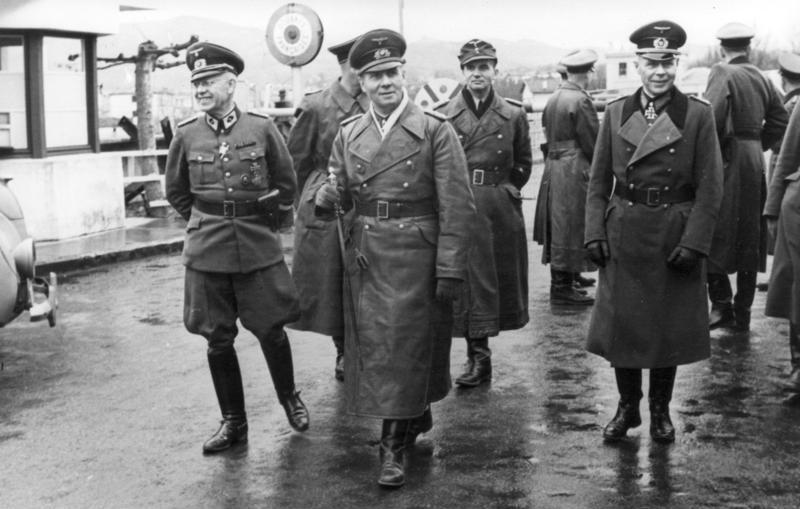
Rommel in Hendaye (February 1944)

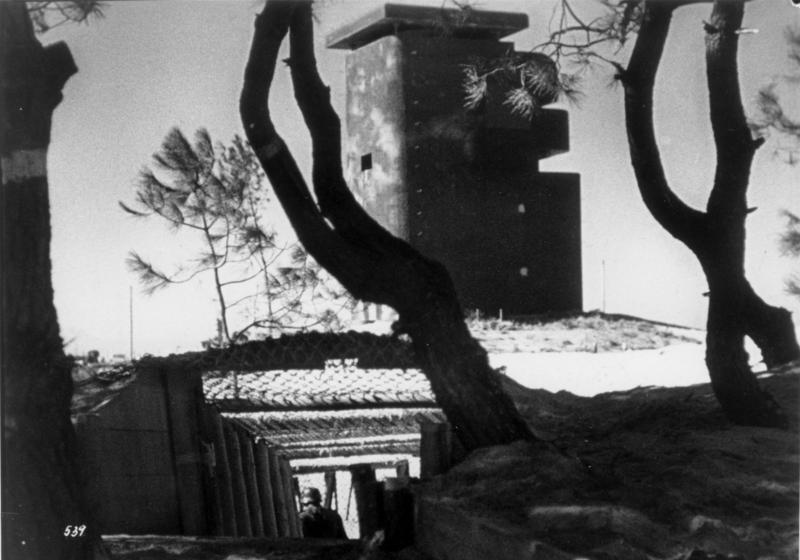
Atlantic Wall station at the mouth of the Adour river (1944)

In 1940 Nazi Germany invaded France. The French army soon succumbed to the Blitzkrieg strategy. The Armistice of 22 June 1940 established a German military administration in occupied France of the French Atlantic, including the French Basque Country, divided at either side of the line extending north to south from Saint-Palais (Donapaleu) to Cambo to Saint-Jean-Pied-de-Port. A 20-km-wide zone interdite along the coast behind the Atlantic wall was restricted to non-resident civilians at certain point during the war period.

The occupied zone ran on the German time zone. The rest of the French Basque Country up to Bearn (Soule and eastern Lower Navarre) was part of Vichy France until 1942, when the "free zone" was occupied by Germany. In June 1940, thousands of Allied Polish troops in retreat from the Battle of France, as well as civilian refugees, were evacuated from Saint-Jean-de-Luz. During the initial Nazi occupation, across the border in Spain, San Sebastián became a tranquil retreat for German army officers, who would spend generously in the area, impoverished after the civil war.

During wartime, many in France supported the Nazi regime and its persecution of Jews, communists, and foreigners. Others resisted, but were deeply divided. In the French Basque Country, the bulk of the Basques showed an allegiance to the Vichy regime. Petain showed a sympathy towards traditional and regional features, which provided fertile grounds to re-launch a Regionalist movement represented by the Eskualerristes and the journal Aintzina ('forward') magazine, some of whose members defended an overt separatist approach. Jean Ybarnegaray became Minister in a cabinet of Marshall Petain up to 1940. However, no regionalist measures came to be implemented by the Vichy regime. The Basque Nationalist Party was in disarray after the exile. Personalities like Eugène Goyheneche explored the possibility of a Basque puppet state after a Nazi victory.Other nationalists, however, gathered intelligence for the Allies.

In the western Pyrenees, especially the Labourd and Lower Navarre, resistance took the form of help for the Jews and downed Allied pilots to cross the border south to the theoretically neutral Spain, with the Basque clergy (e.g. Father Pierre Laffite) and the mugalariak (local smugglers) standing out in that pursuit. Resistance members and smugglers organized in the Comet line to help them cross the border. The Basque version of the French Maquis was centred in Soule, more intense on its highlands, and shaken by Nazi repression (raids, executions).

== End of the occupation in French zone ==
Petain's Vichy France fell starting November 1942, with the Germans taking over all its former territory. The Maquis in Soule helped liberate Mauleon (Maule in Basque) and Tardets (Atharratze). The Nazi occupation of the Basque Country came to an end in 1944, after German troops definitely retreated following the Allied counteroffensive. However, the Germans found time enough to stretch out their Atlantic Wall up to Hendaye, leaving its remains behind, still on-sight today.

The active Basques evacuated on the final stage of the northern front in the Spanish Civil War joined the Allied forces and played a critical role in the Pointe de Grave battle with their Gernika Battalion (Gironde). De Gaulle commented, "France will never forget the sacrifice of the Basques for the liberation of our land." The long-standing conservative weekly Eskualduna was shut down in 1944, for its support to the Vichy regime and the collaborationist stance shown with the Germans. It was replaced by Herria, conducted by Piarres Lafitte.

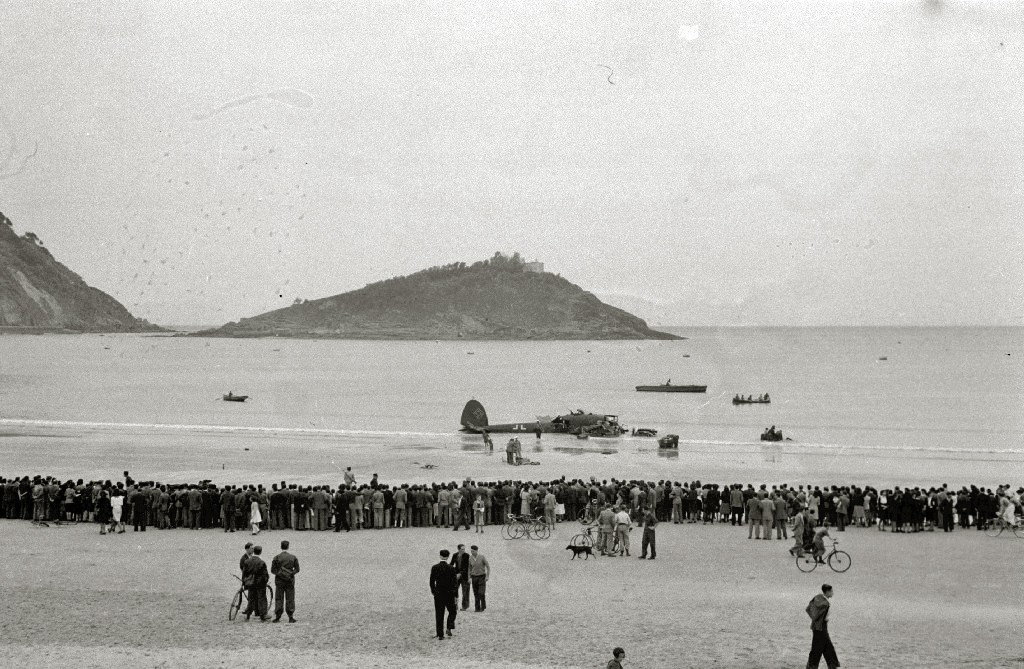
The wreckage of the Heinkel He 111 in which Degrelle escaped to Spain, May 1945

On 7 May 1945, the day of occupied Norway's liberation, Josef Terboven, former Reichskommissar of Norway, put the Walloon Rexist Léon Degrelle and five other men on a Heinkel He 111 bound for Francoist Spain and then South America. The next day, the plane crashed on the Beach of La Concha, at San Sebastián, Spain and Degrelle, who had amongst other injuries sustained a broken leg, was hospitalized and detained.

== Sources ==
- del Hierro, Pablo (2021). "The End of the Affair: The International Dispute over the Deportation of Degrelle from Spain to Belgium, 1945–1946". The International History Review. 43 (4). Taylor & Francis: 761–80. doi:10.1080/07075332.2020.1845777.
- Jackson, J. (2003). France: The Dark Years, 1940–1944. Oxford University Press. pp. 246–247. ISBN 0-19-925457-5.
- Jimenez, J. C. (2019). "Euskaldunak Bigarren Mundu Gerran". Auñamendi Entziklopedia (in Basque).
- Watson, C. (2003). Modern Basque History: Eighteenth Century to the Present. Center for Basque Studies. University of Nevada. ISBN 1-877802-16-6.
