= Frédéric de Jongh =

Belgian resistance fighter (1897–1944)

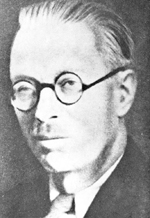
Frédéric de Jongh

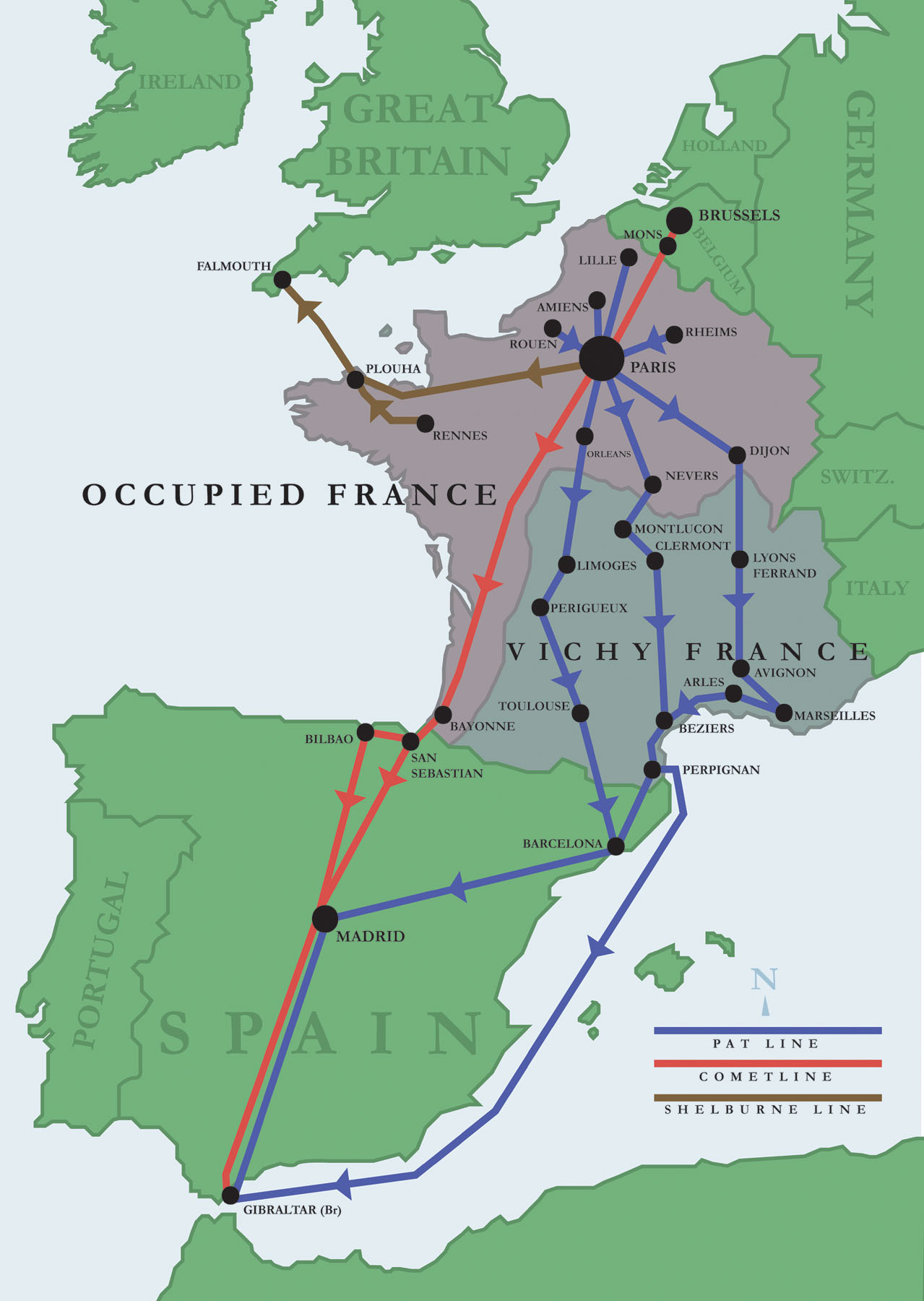
The routes used by escape lines to smuggle airmen out of occupied Europe.

Frédéric Èmile de Jongh (1887–1944), code named Paul, a Belgian, was a member of the Belgian and French Resistance during the Second World War. He was a member of the Comet Line (Le Réseau Comète) which assisted hundred of Allied soldiers and airmen to escape from Nazi-occupied Belgium and France. His daughter Andrée de Jongh was the leader of the Comet Line. After her arrest, Frederic became the leader of the Comet Line in Paris. He was arrested by the Germans in June 1943 and executed by them in March 1944.

== Early life ==
De Jongh was born 13 October 1887 in Brussels, Belgium. He was the son of Marie Adolphine de Jongh, an unmarried housekeeper, and Emile Bouland. Frédéric married Alice Georgine Decarpentrie (1891–1971) and they had two children, Suzanne Wittek (1915–1964) and Andrée de Jongh (1916–2007). He was the headmaster of a primary school in Brussels.

== World War II ==
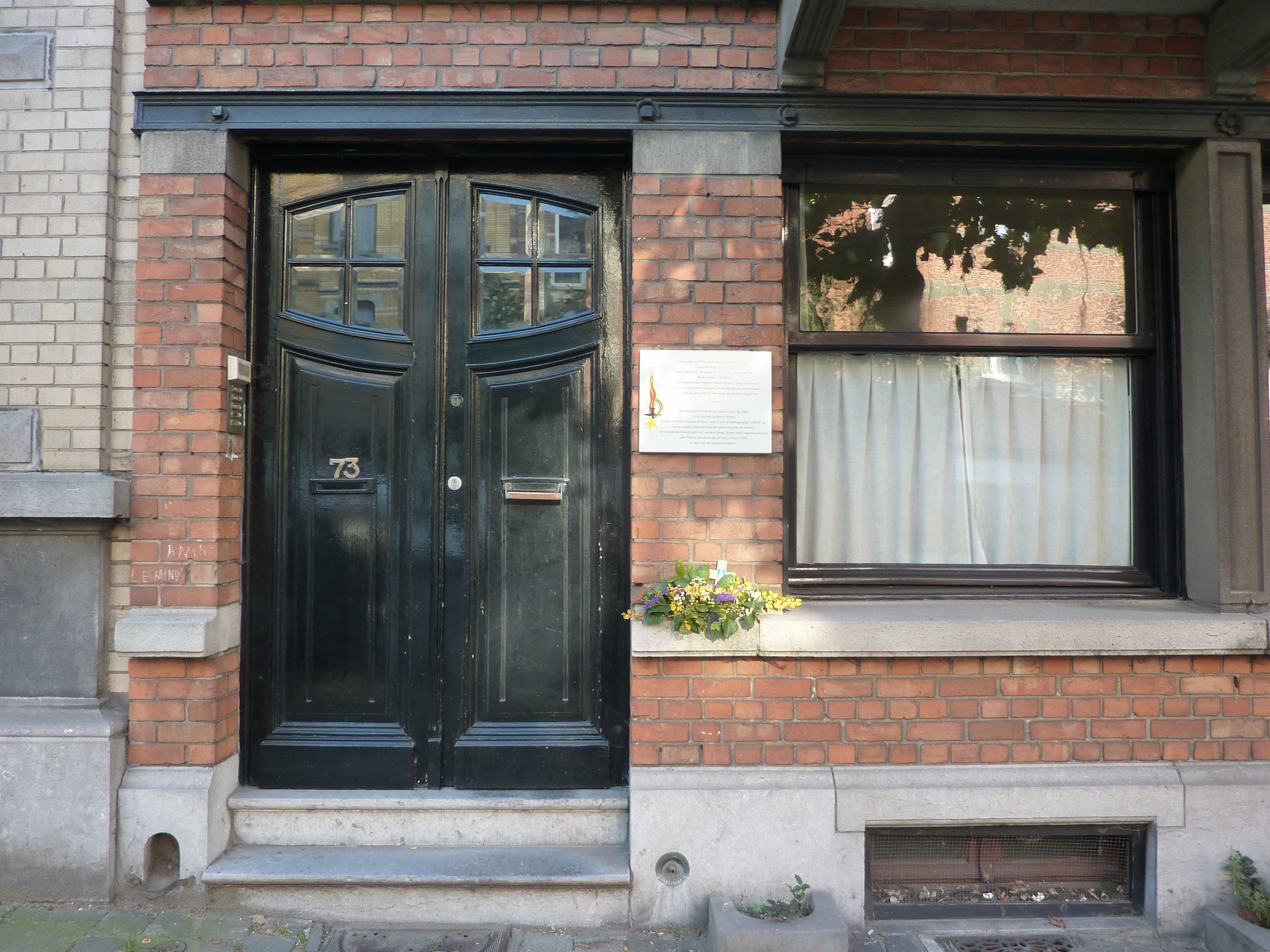
The de Jongh home in Schaerbeek.

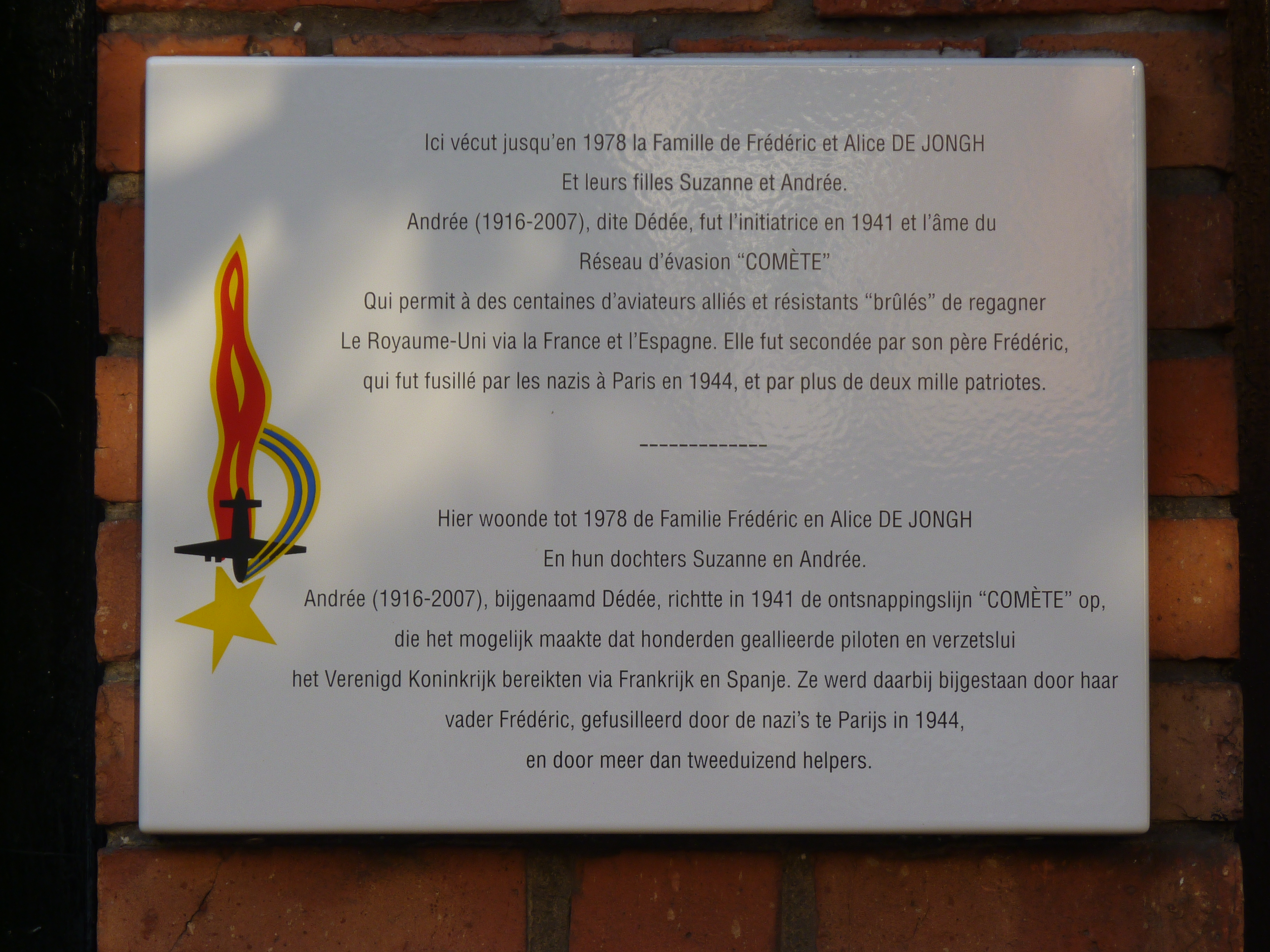
The plaque on the de Jongh House

De Jongh's daughter, Andrée was one of three founders of the Comet Line in April 1941 and soon became the leader of the Line with the arrest of the other two. Belgium and France were occupied by Nazi Germany during World War II. The Comet Line helped Allied soldiers and airmen shot down over occupied Belgium and France evade capture by Germans and return to Great Britain. The Comet Line began in Brussels where the airmen were fed, clothed, given false identity papers, and hidden in attics, cellars, and people's homes. A network of volunteers then escorted them south through occupied France to neutral Spain and home via British-controlled Gibraltar. Many of the Comet Line workers (as they were called) and guides were young women because women could travel more freely and with less suspicion than men in occupied Europe. For Comet Line workers, it was a dangerous activity. Many were arrested and executed or spent the war imprisoned in Germany. The Comet Line is credited with helping 786 people, mostly airmen, evade capture by the Germans.

Andrée de Jongh was the principal guide for airmen from Brussels to Spain and her father, Frederic, tended to duties in Belgium. The family became suspicious to the German occupiers in August 1941 when German agents from the Abwehr visited the de Jongh home in Schaerbeek (a district of Brussels), to inquire about the activities of Andrée. Frédéric portrayed her as a careless young girl who had moved out of the house, location unknown. Warned of the German interest in her, Andrée relocated to Paris and Frederic took charge of the Comet Line in Belgium.

The number of downed airmen was increasing rapidly as Allied bombing campaigns over Europe intensified. In early 1942, the Germany Abwehr and Gestapo arrested many Comet Line helpers in Belgium. In April de Jongh fled to Paris, joining his daughter Andrée there and leaving the line in Belgium in charge of Jean Greindl. On 2 July 1942, Andrée's older married sister, Suzanne, was arrested. She survived the war in German concentration camps. MI9 in London, which provided financial support to the Comet Line, advised Frédéric to leave France for his safety but he refused. In January 1943, Andrée was arrested while escorting airmen to Spain. She also survived the war in concentration camps.

On 7 June 1943, Frédéric de Jongh was arrested. A Comet Line guide who called himself "Jean Masson" told de Jongh that he was bringing a group of eight airmen to Paris via railroad. He said he needed help managing such a large group and asked to be met at the Gare du Nord Paris railroad station. "Jean Masson" was in fact an agent for the Germans named Jacques Desoubrie who had infiltrated the Comet Line. Frederic and Robert and Germaine Aylé went to the station to meet the train and were surrounded by a dozen Germans who arrested them. (Another source says de Jongh was arrested that same day in his home, not at the railroad station.) De Jongh and his colleague Robert Ayle were executed in Paris by a firing squad on 28 March 1944. Aylé's wife Germaine was imprisoned in Germany but either escaped or was freed in Dresden on 6 February 1945.

The Comet Line did not end with the arrest of de Jongh. Jean-François Nothomb became leader of the Paris sector until his arrest in January 1944. Additional leaders came forward and continued the operations of the Comet Line until September 1944 when the Germans had been expelled from France and Belgium.

The school in Brussels where de Jongh was headmaster now bears his name.
