= Peggy van Lier =

Rescuer of people in WW2

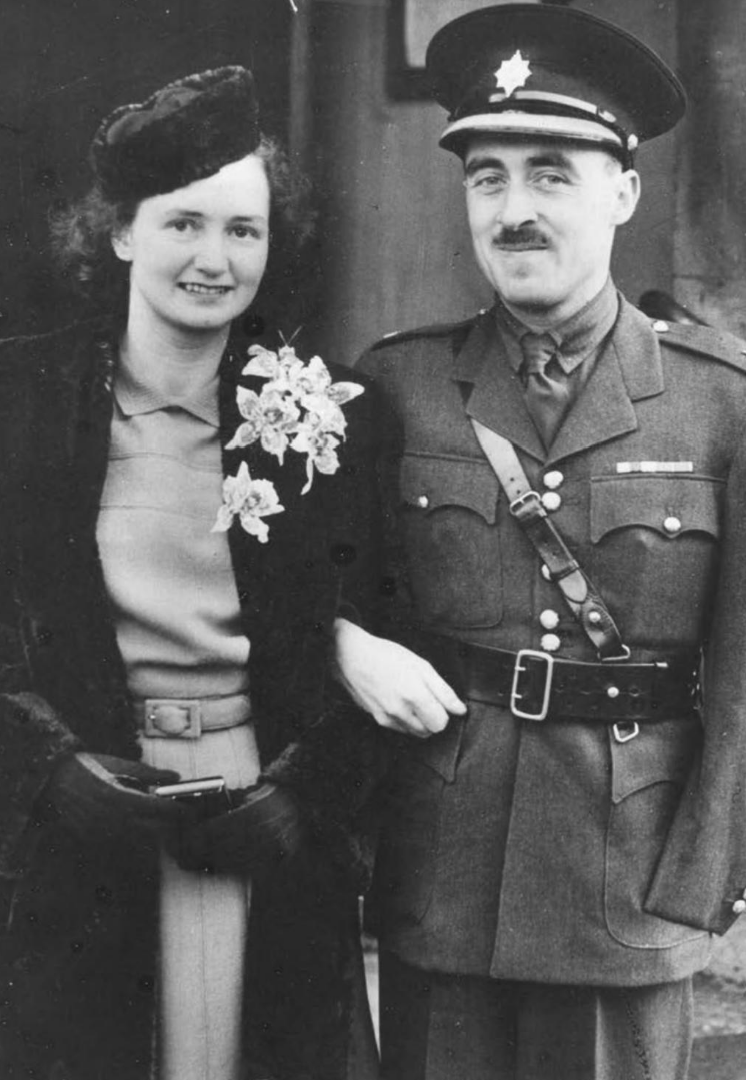
Peggy van Lier and her husband James Langley, 1943.

Marguerite "Peggy" van Lier Langley (born 16 March 1915, South Africa; d. 20 July 2000, England) (code named Michele, Melle, and Mitchell) was a guide in Belgium for the Comet Line which helped allied airmen shot down in World War II over German-occupied Europe escape to neutral Spain.

== Early life ==
Van Lier was born in Johannesburg, South Africa on 16 March 1915, She was the daughter of J. S. van Lier, a Belgian businessman, and Greta O'Reilly of Ireland. Her family returned to Belgium in the 1920s. She spoke French, Flemish, English, and German. Van Lier was described as "a slight, fresh-faced girl with splendid bronze-red hair."

== World War II ==
After the Dunkirk evacuation in 1940, western Europe was mostly occupied by Nazi Germany. The British (and later the Americans) began bombing Germany. The Germans shot down a growing number of the bombers over German-occupied territory as the war rolled on. The airmen not killed or captured were sheltered and helped to escape by members of what are called escape and evasion lines. Based in Brussels, Belgium, the Comet Line was one of the most prominent escape lines. Many of the operatives were young women. Work for the escape lines was dangerous and many of its "helpers" (as they were called) were captured by the Germans and some were executed.

In 1941, van Lier met Jean Greindl (known as "Nemo"), 36 years old. Nemo was running a soup kitchen called the "Swedish Canteen" for the Swedish Red Cross in Brussels. The canteen was in the same city block as German occupation headquarters. Supporters of the canteen maintained good relations with the German occupiers. Nemo was also secretly delivering food to downed airmen hiding in Brussels. Late in 1941, the Germans captured many escape line helpers. Comet Line founder Andree de Jongh fled Belgium to Paris to avoid arrest. Nemo became the leader of the Comet Line in Belgium and van Lier became his assistant. Van Lier had become known to the Comet Line as she was a friend of de Jongh's married sister, Suzanne de Wittek. Initially van Lier kept her involvement secret from her parents.

Van Lier and other Comet Line workers visited airmen in hiding, forged identification papers for them, and accompanied the airmen (few of whom spoke French) to Paris where de Jongh or others met them and guided them onward to Spain. It was dangerous work. De Jongh told Van Lier that she doubted that Nemo would last as Comet Line leader for more than six months before he was captured by the Germans. (He lasted almost a year.)

The Germans struck again at the Comet Line in November 1942, capturing many of the Comet Line workers including the Maréchal family. When van Lier went to investigate the disappearance of the Maréchals she was captured. She was interrogated by a "fat, evil, rat-faced SS officer" but she was released after she persuaded him that she was innocent by showing him photos of herself with German officers she had cultivated as friends. However, Belgium was becoming too dangerous, and van Lier and others fled the country on 3 December. Van Lier used the Comet Line infrastructure that had helped airmen to escape to Spain to carry out her own escape. After crossing the Pyrenees and entering Spain, she was met by Michael Creswell of the British Embassy. Illegally in Spain and conspicuous because of her red hair, the British accompanied her to Seville where she was smuggled to British-owned Gibraltar in a boat loaded with oranges. From Gibraltar she was taken to England by air.

Van Lier said she had a premonition that she would marry the first Englishman she met in England and on her arrival on 3 January 1943, Lt. James Langley met her at the airbase. Langley had been wounded and had an arm amputated earlier in the war. The pair married in November 1943. After the war, Langley worked for Fisons until 1967 and afterwards the couple ran a bookshop in Suffolk. They had four sons and a daughter.

After the war van Lier was awarded the Order of the British Empire, the U.S. Medal of Freedom, the Belgian Croix de Guerre, and the Dutch Cross of Resistance.
