= Escape and evasion map =

Maps made for soldiers caught behind enemy lines

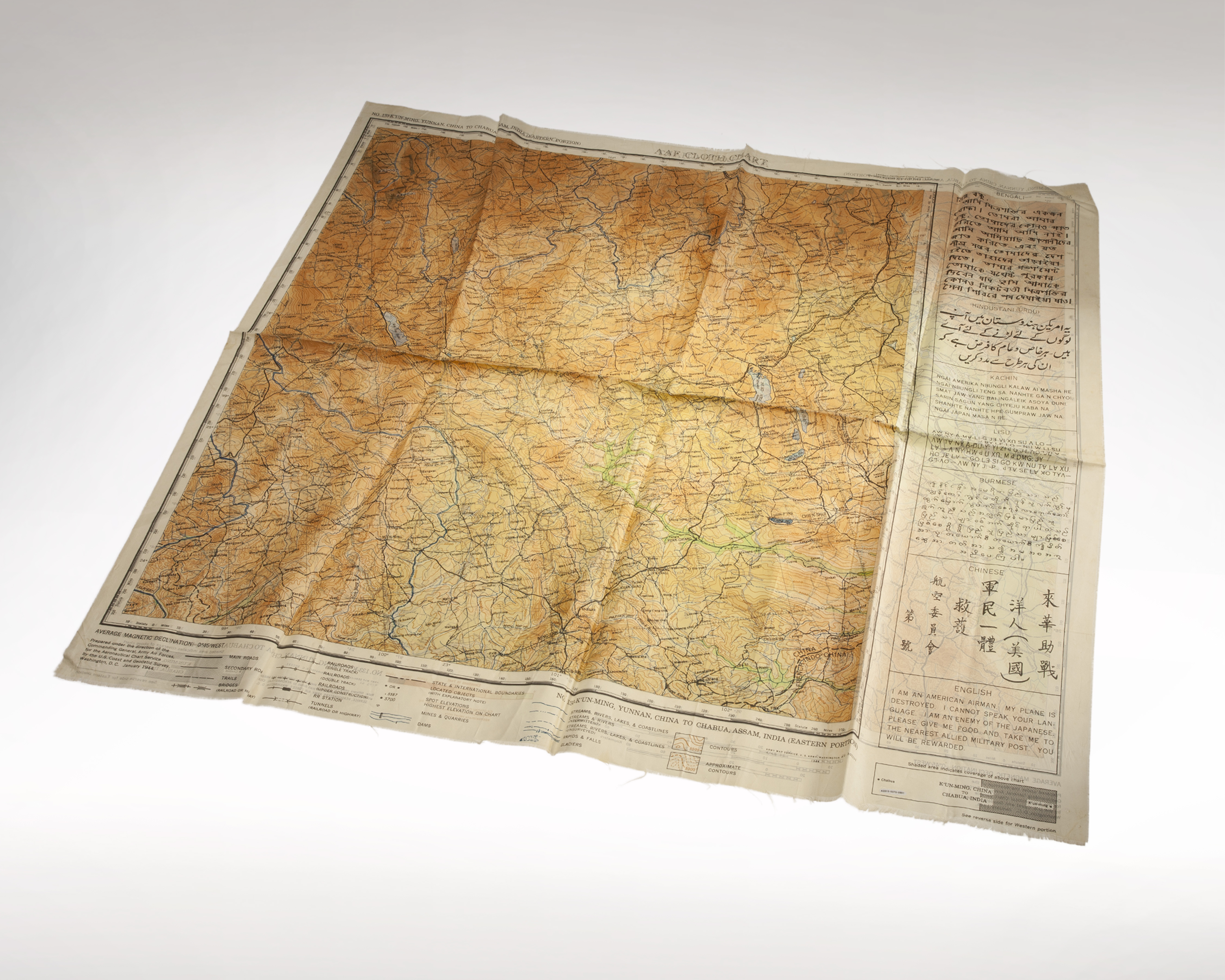
Silk Escape and evasion map, Office of Strategic Services

Evasion charts or escape maps are maps made for servicemembers, and intended to be used when caught behind enemy lines to assist in performing escape and evasion. Such documents were secreted to prisoners of war by various means to aid in escape attempts.

During World War II, these clandestine maps were used by many American, British, and allied servicemen to escape from behind enemy lines. Special material was used for this purpose, due to the need for a material that would be hardier than paper, and would not tear or dissolve in water.

Evasion charts produced for the US, UK, and NATO were printed on vinyl sheet in the 1960s. Modern evasion charts are made of Tyvek 'paper', which permit printing of minute detail while remaining waterproof and tear-resistant.

== World Wars ==
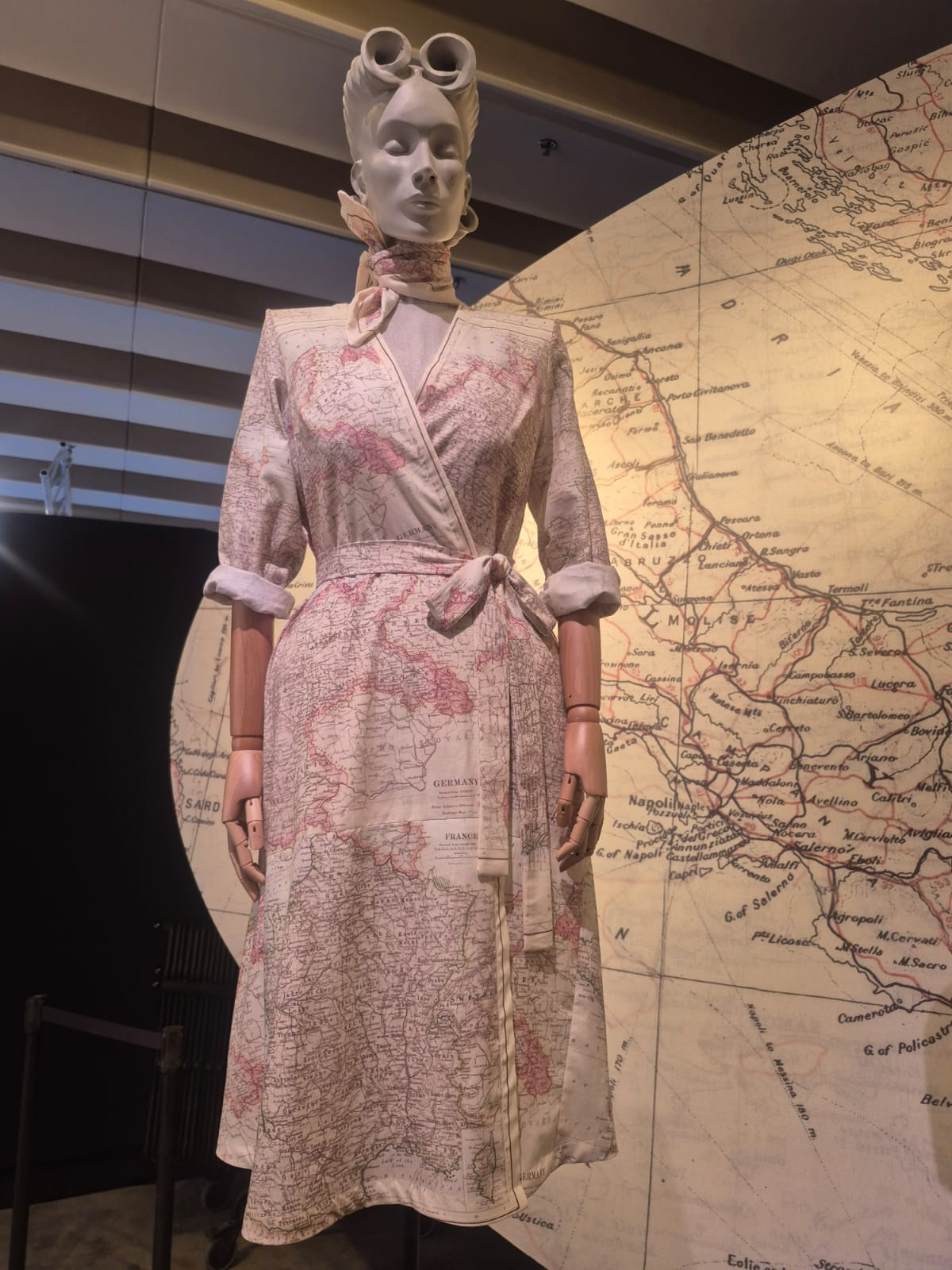
Dress made from escape maps, shown at Design Museum Holon

During World War I Australians produced an escape map for use in July 1918 by prisoners in the German Holzminden POW Camp, sections of map were sewn into the clothing of prisoners who escaped via a tunnel to Allied territory."

Some American intelligence offices visited the UK in 1942 to be briefed on the British efforts in "escape and evasion" techniques and equipment. The British MI9 gave the Americans a book or manual called "Per Ardua Libertas" to take back to the US. Published in this manual were examples of each cloth escape and tissue escape map that the British had produced. "After this meeting with the British, the United States began to produce its own escape maps." Most of the American maps supplied by the Army Map Service from World War II were actually printed on rayon acetate materials, and not silk. However, because of the silky texture of the materials, they were referred to by the more familiar textile name.

"During WWII hundreds of thousands of maps were produced by the British on thin cloth and tissue paper. The idea was that a serviceman captured or shot down behind enemy lines should have a map to help him find his way to safety if he escaped or, better still, evade capture in the first place." Many of these maps were also used in clandestine wartime activities.

The cloth maps were sometimes hidden in special editions of the Monopoly board game sets sent to the prisoners of war camps. The marked game sets also included foreign currency (French and German, for example), compasses and other items needed for escaping Allied prisoners of war. Escape maps were also printed on playing cards distributed to Prisoners of War which could be soaked and peeled apart revealing the escape map. Other maps were hidden inside spools of cotton thread in sewing kits. "Due to the inherent strength and extremely compact nature of the MI9 mulberry leaf tissue maps, they could be wound into twine and then rolled into the core of cotton reels..."

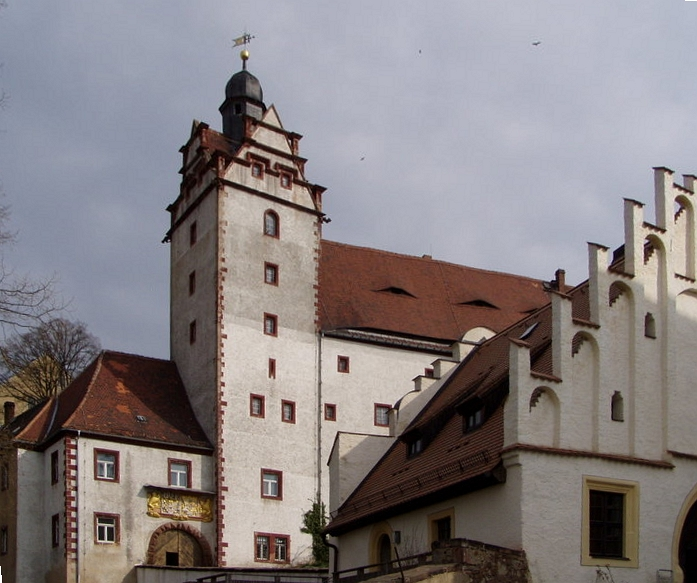
Oflag IV-C, more commonly known as Colditz Castle

Many of the maps of the Pacific region were printed by the US Army Map Service, while the UK was responsible for many of the European Theatre maps.

Many of the US Navy charts were folded in envelopes and distributed to the air crews before a mission, and to be turned in when the mission was successfully completed. They were called "drift charts" by the Navy, "...since their prime purpose was to indicate to aircrews survivors in their life rafts in which direction the ocean currents and prevailing winds would cause their rafts to drift...".

The maps were quite effective. Some 35,000 Allied troops in all escaped from enemy territory during WWII, and it is estimated that almost half of them used variations on these maps to help in their escape or evasion of capture.

== Post WWII to modern evasion charts ==
New US evasion charts were also printed for the US Air Force after the war on synthetic fabric from 1947 to 1951. There are nineteen sheets printed in this series. Each sheet has a graphic in the lower right-hand corner showing where the sheet lies. Each sheet is identified by a "CL" followed by a two to three digit number. Map coverage in this series starts at the North pole and covers down to the equator. The 19th sheet is at 1:500,000 scale and covers both North and South Korea.

The post WWII charts were superseded by evasion charts printed on vinyl plastic sheet and included multiple declination corrected compass roses and a star chart for finding Polaris for navigation at night. These were issued during the American conflict with Vietnam, but the print was subject to wear and the plastic was prone to stress cracking at folds and corners when carried on flying days for several months as USAF Captain Roger Locher noted when using one during his record 23-day evasion and rescue near Hanoi after his F-4 Phantom fighter jet was shot down. He also suggested a more detailed 1:50,000 map would have been more useful to him as a combat evader on the ground than the 1:250:000 evasion chart, Locher recommended two evasion charts could be overlapped to protect a downed airman from rain if worn "like an armidillo". Locher's evasion experience, the longest for an uncaptured American pilot since WWII deep in enemy territory, would guide USAF survival training and future design of evasion charts.

Current USAF evasion charts, introduced immediately before Operation Desert Storm, and also issued to many allied air forces, are printed on spunbond olefin fiber polymer sheet and are waterproof and extremely strong. They include survival navigation instructions using the US lensatic compass and basic celestial orientation for use when lacking a compass or GPS, use of the survival radio, edible and dangerous plants, fish, and animals found in the map area, sea current flow rates, first aid instructions, and other localized survival tips. The maps are camouflage patterned and can be used as a blanket, sun cover, splint, food or water carrier, and wound cover in addition to assisting in navigation, they are large enough to even use as a sleeping wrap. USAF Captain Scott O'Grady, brought down by hostile fire over Bosnia in 1996, later wrote “When I was finally settled in, I pulled my evasion chart from my G-suit pocket and began to plot the longitude and latitude coordinates I’d gotten from my GPS receiver last night… [It] showed all the hills valleys, rivers, and land features around me. On the legend was other helpful information about local vegetation and animals”. Captain O'Grady found the chart so large that he cut out his evasion area to make it more usable.

== Bibliography ==
- Australia. 1944. Manila. [Australia]: R.A.A.F. OCLC: 36343193.
- Aviation Cartography: A Historico-Bibliographic Study of Aeronautical Charts, Reference Department, Map Division, Library of Congress, Washington 1960.
- Aeronautical Chart Production, Military Engineer, Paul A. Smith, Vol 35, No. 213, Jul 1943, pp. 357–361.
- Aeronautical Chart Service, The Military Engineer, T. B. Cantrell, Aug 1947, pp 328–329.
- Baldwin, R.E., 'Silk escape maps: where are they now?'. Mercator's World Jan/Feb 1998, 50–51
- Bond, Barbara, 'Silk maps: the story of MI9's excursion into the world of cartography 1939–45'. The Cartographic Journal 21 (1984) 141–144 (Maps 160.e.4)
- Bond, Barbara, 'Maps printed on silk'. The Map Collector 22 (1983) 10–13 (Maps Ref. D.3(2))
- Cash, John Richard. n.d. A section of a map of Germany made to help Allied Prisoners of War (POW) to escape in July 1918 from Holzminden POW Camp in Germany to the Dutch border. The sections of map were sewn into the clothing. Item Held by the Australian War Memorial.
- Clayton-Hutton, Christopher Official secret: the remarkable story of escape aids, their invention, production and the sequel. London: Max Parrish, 1960 (9196. L.22)
- "CLOTH MAP COLLECTION (400 items). Maps printed or photoreproduced on various fibers such as silk and tissue, 1626–1987." Geography & Map Reading Room. Library of Congress. Washington, DC.
- Doll, John G. 2002. Cloth maps, charts and blood chits of World War II. Bennington, Vt: Merriam Press. World War II Historical Society monograph, 41. OCLC: 50874309. ISBN 978-1-57638-024-6; 978-1-57638-072-7.
- Evans, Michael, 'PoW tells of escape maps printed on secret press' The Times, 23 June 1997.
- Garber, Megan. 2013. "How Monopoly Games Helped Allied POWs Escape During World War II." The Atlantic. January 2013.
- Silk Maps: The Story of MI9’s Excursion into the World of Cartography, Barbara Bond, Cartographic Journal, Vol 21, No.2, Dec 1984, pp. 141–145.
- MI9 Fabric Maps 1939–1945, Barbara Bond SMRO/SLR, Maps Division Dec 1982 (interlibrary memo).
- Maps Printed on Silk, Barbara Bond, Map Collector, No. 22, 1983, pages 10–13.
- Cloth Maps of World War 2, John G. Doll, Western Association of Map Libraries, Vol 20, No.1, Nov 1988, pp. 24–35.
- US Navy Handkerchief Charts of World War 2, John G. Doll, UNKNOWN PUB, pp 190–192.
- The Making of Military Maps, William H. Nicholas, National Geographic, Jun 1943, pp 764–778.
- Blueprints for Victory, John F. Shupe, National Geographic, Vol 187, No. 5, May 1945, pp 55–71.
- Cloth Charts Bring Survivors Back, UNKNOWN PUB.
- War Correspondence inspired by Pilot’s poor punctuation, The Daily Telegraph, 28 Oct 1997, p14.
- How Monopoly got POWs out of Jail Free, The Times, 12 Jun 1997, Peter Foster.
- The MIS-X Files, Mercator’s World, Jan–Feb 1998.
- Silk Escape Maps: Where are they now?, RE Baldwin, Mercator’s World, Jan–Feb 1998, pp 50–51.
- Per Ardua Libertas- reprinted copy. Photographic record of maps and items obtained and used by M.I.9 (Military Intelligence) to aid in the escape of British Prisoners of War during the Second World War.OCLC: 43249403; 506116873.
- Escape from Hitler’s Europe, Student Research Paper, Air Command and Staff College.
- It’s the Little Things: Escape and Evasion in World War 2, US Army Military History Collection, ADTIC Pub No. G-100, July 1950, Air University, Maxwell AFB.
- Conquerors of the Airways: A brief History of the USAF ACIC & Aeronautical Charts, Alfred H. Burton, USAF St. Louis, MO, Jun 1953.
- Historical Highlights in Cartography, ACIC, ACD Cartographic Training School Research Course Sep 1965, pp 28–30.
- History of the USAF Aeronautical Chart Service, Prepared by Mr. LP Brown, 7 Feb 1950, 6 pgs.
- Map Intelligence, Army Map Service, Corps of Engineers, US Army, Ed 2, 1954, pp 14–15, 228–257.
- Charts for the Air Force, an address by COL Richard Philbrick, Commander USAF Aeronautical Chart and information Center, at the National Convention of the American Society of Civil Engineers, 17 Jun 1955.
- Cloth Maps and Charts, The Military Engineer, Albert A. Stanley, Vol 39, 1947, p126.
- Surveys and Maps, The Military Engineer, Nov–Dec 1958, pp 468–473.
- Cartographic Innovations: An International Handbook of Mapping Terms to 1900, Edited by Helen M. Wallis and Arthur H. Robinson, ICA, 1987, pp 271–274.
- Catalog of Aeronautical Charts and Related Publications, USAAF, May 1942 (first Edition), Map-Chart Division, Washington DC.
- In the Space Age, Army Map Service publication.
- World War Two Records in the Cartographic and Architectural Branch of the National Archives, National Archives Reference Information Paper 79.
- Stanley, Albert A., 'Cloth maps and charts'. The Military Engineer (1 947) 126
- Unknown. n.d. Autographed furoshiki (wrapping cloth) carried by Japanese soldier Tsuchiya Akira, South Bougainville, 1945.
- Wallis, Helen and Robinson, Arthur, Cartographical innovations. Tring: Map Collector Publications, 1987 (Maps Ref. B.3b. (24))
