= Edgard Potier =

Belgian airforce officer (1903–1944)

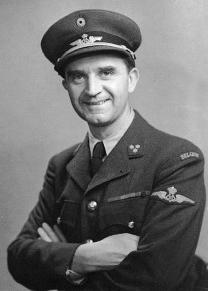
Edgard Potier (1903-1944)

Dominique Edgard Antoine Potier (2 November 1903 – 11 January 1944) was a Belgian airforce officer during World War II who organised an MI9 escape and evasion network, known as Mission Martin in Belgium and the Possum Line in France. Captured and tortured by the Germans, Potier committed suicide.

== World War II service ==
In May 1940, Potier was Capitaine-Commandant in the Belgian airforce. With the outbreak of World War II, Potier travelled across France, Spain and Portugal and arrived in England in March 1942. At age 39, he was rejected by the RAF as too old for active flying duties. He then joined MI9 and in July 1943 was parachuted into southeast Belgium (Province of Luxembourg) near Suxy, accompanied by a Canadian radio operator Conrad Lafleur. At this time, many allied aircrew, on bombing raids to Germany, were being shot down over the Belgian Ardennes. Potier's mission, known as Mission Martin in Belgium and the Possum Line in France, was to organise the recovery of these airmen and shelter, feed and provide them with false identity documents, before moving them to safe houses in and around Reims in Northern France. Unlike the Ardennes, this area was suitable for evacuation by air, using Lysander aircraft.

Between August and December 1943, three successful operations took place repatriating eleven airmen and one SOE agent. The organisation also provided for and escorted airmen to the Brittany coast, in November 1943, for rescue by sea; an operation organised by the Jade-Fitzroy network. Possum operated safehouses in Paris, allowing evaders to be passed on to the Comète organisation. The two organisations in many ways supplemented each other's activities. There are no records, but it is estimated some 60–70 airmen had passed through or were being sheltered by Possum.

After returning to England for a period, Potier was parachuted back into France on 20 December. On 28 December, Lafleur was transmitting messages to London, when he was surprised by the Germans. He escaped, but it was the start of a sequence of events that eventually led to the arrest of Potier. Initially he was taken to Fresnes prison in Paris, then returned to Reims, where after being subjected to considerable torture, he committed suicide on 11 January 1944. As more arrests followed, the organisation around Reims effectively collapsed. Of the 70 network members arrested in the French sector of Possum, some 60 were deported. Less than half returned.

== Reburial ==
Potier's remains were exhumed from Reims and, on 18 September 1950, he was reburied with full military honours in the Pelouse d'Honneur Aérienne, Cimetière Communal de B-1140 Bruxelles-Evère.
