= Monique Hanotte =

Belgian resistance member (1920–2022)

Monique Hanotte MBE
- Hanotte in uniform around 1944
- Born: Henriette Hanotte; 10 August 1920; Nivelles, Belgium
- Died: 20 February 2022 (aged 101)
- Known for: Belgian Resistance member
- Awards: MBE (UK); Medal of Freedom (USA)

Henriette Hanotte MBE (10 August 1920 – 20 February 2022), also known as Monique Hanotte, was a Belgian resistance member during World War II. From the age of nineteen, she aided the escape of nearly 140 airmen from occupied Belgium into France as part of the Comet Line. She was given the codename 'Monique' by the British War Office, a name she then used throughout her life.

== Early life ==
Henriette Hanotte lived in the rural village of Rumes in Belgium, close to the French border. Her parents ran a hotel and a farm, where she and her younger brother helped look after the animals. She went to school each day in the nearby French village of Bachy, so became known to the officers manning the customs posts as she needed to cross the border every day.

== Resistance activities ==
In May 1940, shortly after the German occupation of Belgium, Hanotte and her father assisted two officers who had become separated during the retreat of the British Expeditionary Force to Dunkirk. They were disguised, and led the short distance through a customs post and into Reichskommissariat France.

Hanotte was subsequently recruited by the British War Office section, MI19 to actively participate in the Belgian resistance network called Comet Line, and was given the codename "Monique". Over the course of the war, she and her family aided the escape of nearly 140 Allied forces airmen, either by accompanying them across the border, or travelling with them by train to cities such as Lille and Paris. In doing so she risked her own life and those of her family, if caught.

She and her mother worked hard to disguise the airmen they were smuggling to safety by removing any English paperwork, an even English labels from their clothing. They also have them copies of German newspapers, and taught them French phrases and how to say them in a convincing accent. They also forged French ID cards and work permits for them. As she knew a lot of the secret routes across the border, as well as the border staff, she mostly escorted them without a hitch. One border patrol guard was the father of a friend, so she would often ask when he was working so she could cross with some Americans. She often passed them off as her boyfriends.

She almost got into trouble one of the times she accompanied some airmen on the train. A nazi official shared their carriage and asked to borrow a newspaper that one of them was carrying. He also tried to make small talk with them. She gave him her paper and answered all of the questions so the men didn't have to speak and reveal their disguises.

In 1944, whilst travelling to the safe house she used in Paris she discovered that her network had been revealed by a Belgian collaborator. The curtains were closed, a symbol which meant that there was trouble. She was supposed to have been arrested at the train station earlier that day, but was saved by the fact that her train was three hours late. She was ordered by her British handlers to escape to England by following the same route as that used by the airmen she had assisted. She escaped with Micheline Dumon, another member of the Comet Line. After travelling through German-occupied France to Spain (under Franco Dictatorship) via the Pyrenees, she reached Gibraltar, and from there flew to Britain. Once there, she was taught to parachute and to be a secret agent in advance of being dropped into France as part of the Ardennes Counteroffensive of December 1944. However, she was never sent, and remained in England until after the war. She narrowly missed out on being deployed, due to a fractured wrist.

== Post war ==
On 8 May 1945, Hanotte celebrated VE Day (Victory in Europe Day) in London before returning to her family home in Belgium. In 1945 she married the boyfriend she had known during the war who had been a Belgian border guard. They subsequently had two children. Hanotte continued using the name Monique throughout her life.

== Death ==
Hanotte died in Nivelles on 19 February 2022, at the age of 101.

== Honours ==
The British appointed her a Member of the British Empire (MBE) for her services in World War II. She was awarded the Medal of Freedom by the United States, a decoration established by President Harry S. Truman to honour civilians whose actions aided in the war efforts of the United States and its allies during and beyond World War II.

In May 2015, a hiking circuit was opened to mark the route taken by Monique Hanotte to help airmen escape from Belgium into France.

A statue of "Monique" was installed in Place de la Liberté in the French commune of Bachy, depicting her assisting American bombardier, Charles Carlson, to escape from Belgium.

In 2015 Hanotte was given honorary citizenship of Bachy and in 2020 honorary citizenship of Nivelles where she lived.

== See also ==
- National Museum of the Resistance in Anderlecht, Belgium
- Belgium in World War II
- Free Belgian Forces
- Österreichische Freiheitsfront
