= Comet Line =

World War II Belgian Resistance organization

Belgian Resistance
- Part of Resistance during World War II
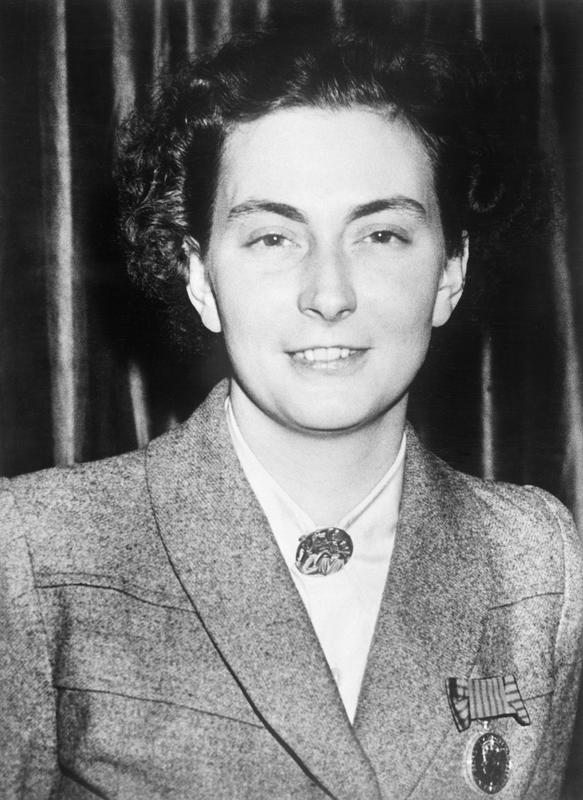
- Andrée de Jongh, head of the Comet Line, receiving the George Medal in 1946
Date	June 1941 – December 1944
Location	Occupied Belgium, Occupied France, Spain
Result	Evacuation of hundreds of downed Allied airman from Belgium through France to neutral Spain from where they could be repatriated to Great Britain.

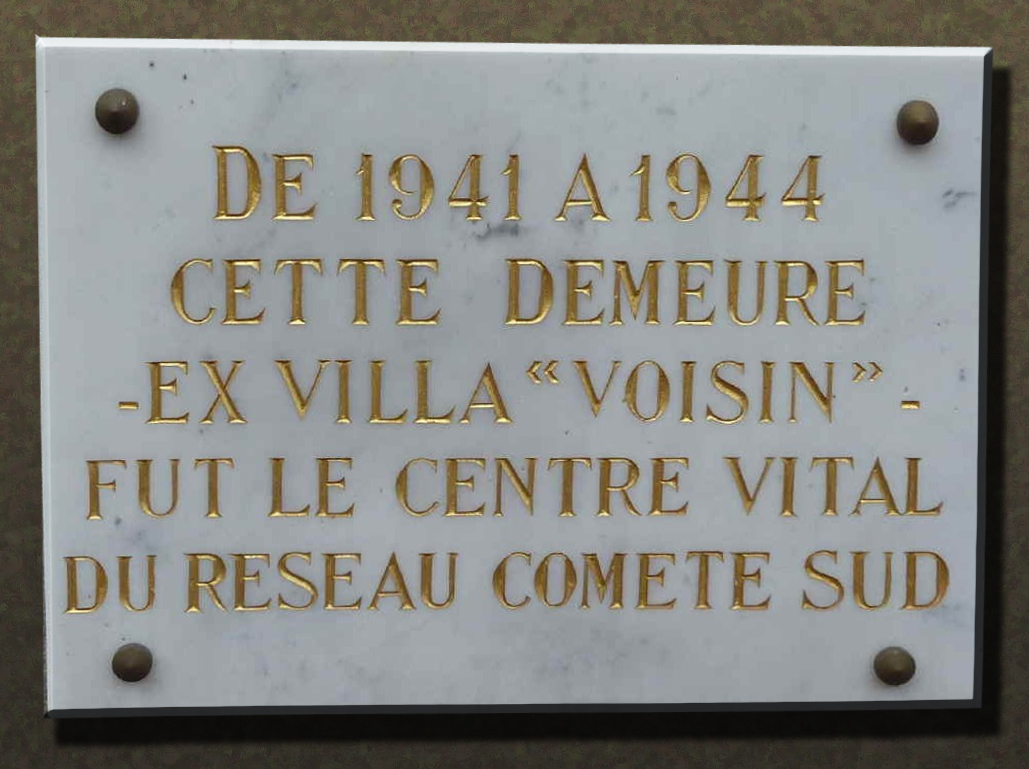
Commemorative plaque on the site of Villa Voisin, the de Greef's house in Anglet.

The helpers gambled their homes—even the lives of their families—to help the airmen escape, and many of them lost ... it is not difficult to understand that over 50 years later tributes are still paid to the World War II helpers, and enormous gratitude still remains with each of the airmen saved by these heroic people.

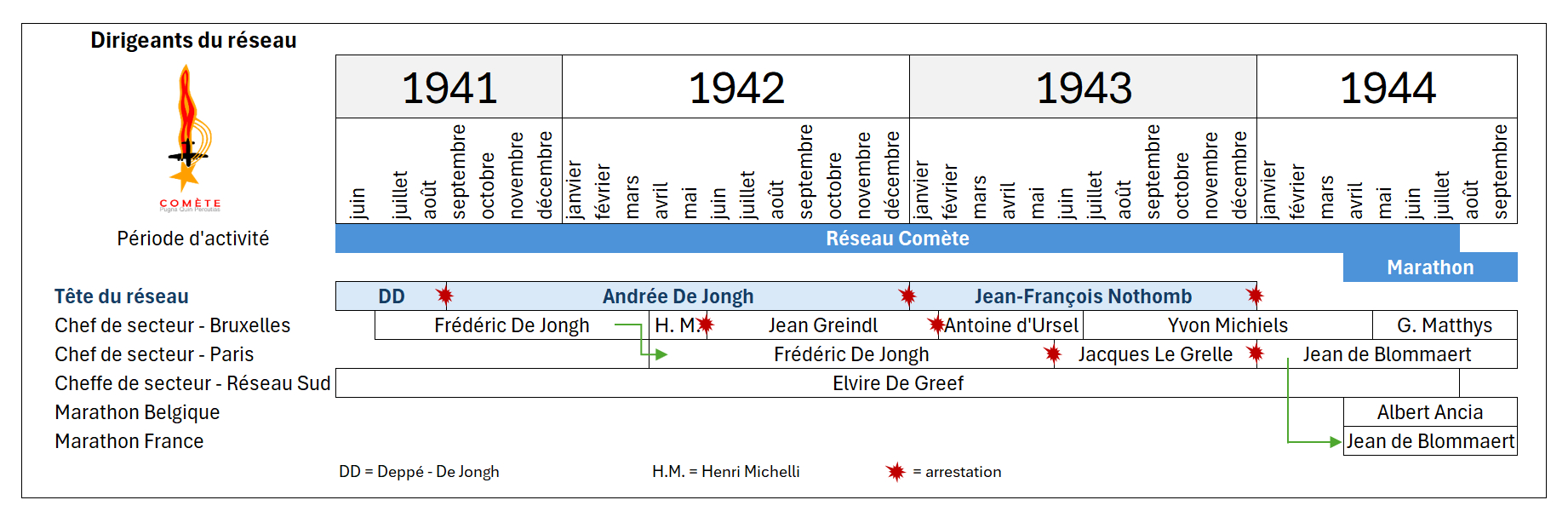
Leaders of the Comet Line

The Comet Line (French: Réseau Comète; 1941–1944) was a Resistance organization in occupied Belgium and France in the Second World War. The Comet Line helped Allied soldiers and airmen shot down over occupied Belgium evade capture by Germans and return to Great Britain. The Comet Line began in Brussels where the airmen were fed, clothed, given false identity papers, and hidden in attics, cellars, and people's homes. A network of volunteers then escorted them south through occupied France into neutral Spain and home via British-controlled Gibraltar. The motto of the Comet Line was "Pugna Quin Percutias", which means "fight without arms", as the organization did not undertake armed or violent resistance to the German occupation.

The Comet Line was the largest of several escape networks in occupied Europe. In three years, the Comet Line helped 776 people, mostly British and American airmen, escape to Spain or evade capture in Belgium and France. An estimated 3,000 civilians, mostly Belgians and French, assisted the Comet Line. They are usually called "helpers". Seven hundred helpers were arrested by the Germans and 290 were executed or died in prison or concentration camps. The Comet Line maintained its operational independence, but received financial assistance from MI9, a British intelligence agency dedicated to the rescue of Allied prisoners of war and service members from behind enemy lines.

For the Allies, the rescue of downed airmen by the Comet and other escape lines had a practical as well as a humanitarian objective. Training new and replacement air crews was expensive and time-consuming. Rescuing airmen downed in occupied Europe and returning them to duty was a priority. Andrée de Jongh (code named "Dédée"), a 24-year-old Belgian woman, was the first leader of the Comet Line. She was imprisoned by the Germans in 1943, but survived the war. Subsequent leaders were also imprisoned, executed, or killed in the course of their work getting airmen to Spain. Young women, including teenagers, played important roles in the Comet Line. Sixty-five to 70 percent of Comet Line helpers were women.

== Creation ==
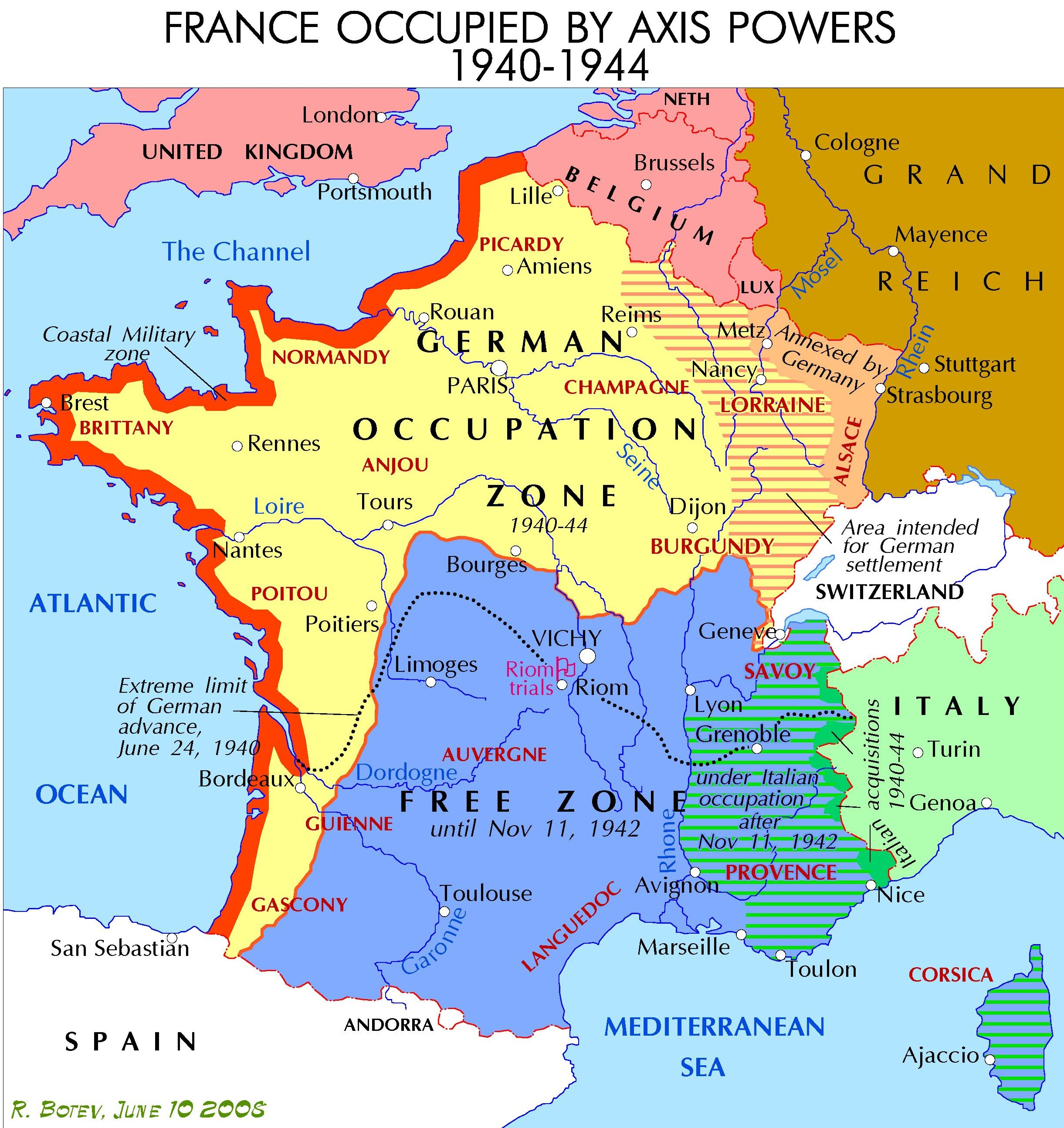
Nazi-occupied France and Belgium

In 1941, an increasing number of British and allied aircraft were being shot down in Nazi-occupied Europe. Most downed airmen were killed or taken prisoner but some evaded capture and were sheltered by allied sympathizers and an emerging resistance movement to German rule. In Belgium, Andrée de Jongh age 24, Arnold Deppé age 32, and Jacques Donny age 47 (Treasurer), created what became known as the Comet Line (Reseau Comet) to help Allied airmen escape and return to the United Kingdom. All three founders worked for the Société Financière de Transport et d'Entreprises Industrielles (SOFINA). In June 1941, Deppé travelled from Belgium to southwestern France, where he had once lived, to look for the means to smuggle Allied soldiers, shot-down airmen, and other people vulnerable to capture by the Germans out of Belgium. Deppé made contact with the de Greef family in Anglet, near the Spanish border and arranged for their help in getting people across the border. Elvire De Greef, known as Tante Go (Auntie Go), and members of her family became stalwarts of the Comet Line.

In July 1941, De Jongh and Deppé, assisted by the de Greefs, attempted their first crossing of the Spanish border with 10 Belgian men and a Belgian female secret agent named Frederique Dupuich. After they crossed the border, de Jongh and Deppé left their charges to fend for themselves and returned to Belgium. The Belgians were arrested by Spanish police and three Belgian soldiers among them were turned over to the Germans in France. The others were jailed briefly and fined. From this experience, de Jongh and Deppé realized that they must accompany their charges secretly all the way to the British Consulate in Bilbao and obtain British assistance.

In August, Deppé and de Jongh escorted another group of people, de Jongh taking a longer, more rural, and safer route with three men, including Private James Cromar of the Gordon Highlanders, 51st (Highland) Division and Deppé taking a shorter, more dangerous route with six men. An informer betrayed Deppé and he and his group were arrested by the Germans. Deppé was imprisoned for the remainder of the war. De Jongh arrived safely at the de Greefs' house and crossed into Spain with a Basque smuggler as a guide. De Jongh and her three charges arrived at the British Consulate in Bilbao. She persuaded the British government to pay the Comet Line's expenses for transporting Allied soldiers and airmen from Belgium to Spain but declined all other assistance and guidance offered by the British. MI9 (British Military Intelligence Section 9), under the control of the ex-infantry Major Norman Crockatt and Lieutenant James Langley, who had been repatriated after losing his left arm in the rearguard at Dunkirk in 1940, approved financial assistance for the Comet Line.

Other than financial assistance, De Jongh was adamant in retaining the independence of the Comet Line from the British and the Belgian government in exile in Great Britain. She said that the Belgian and British attempts to control the Comet Line "were given by people who were not aware of the situation, and did not understand the spirit that drove the team, nor the...situation under which the work was being done". Langley of MI9 commented that the Comet Line's "intransigence and failure to make use of some of the help we offered them...nearly drove me frantic". Until 1943, the Comet Line denied the offer of the British to supply it with radios and radio operators to facilitate vetting of shot-down Allied airmen and communication. The rationale was that resistance groups were often broken up by the Germans because a radio had been captured. De Jongh declined to communicate via radio, but rather used couriers to deliver and receive messages to and from British diplomats in Spain. It was not until June 1943, after numerous arrests and a growing backlog of airmen to be removed, that the Comet Line gave its reluctant permission for an MI9 agent, Jacques Legrelle ("Jerome"), to work in Paris with them. Legrelle proved to be compatible with the overworked leadership of the Comet Line.

== Removals ==
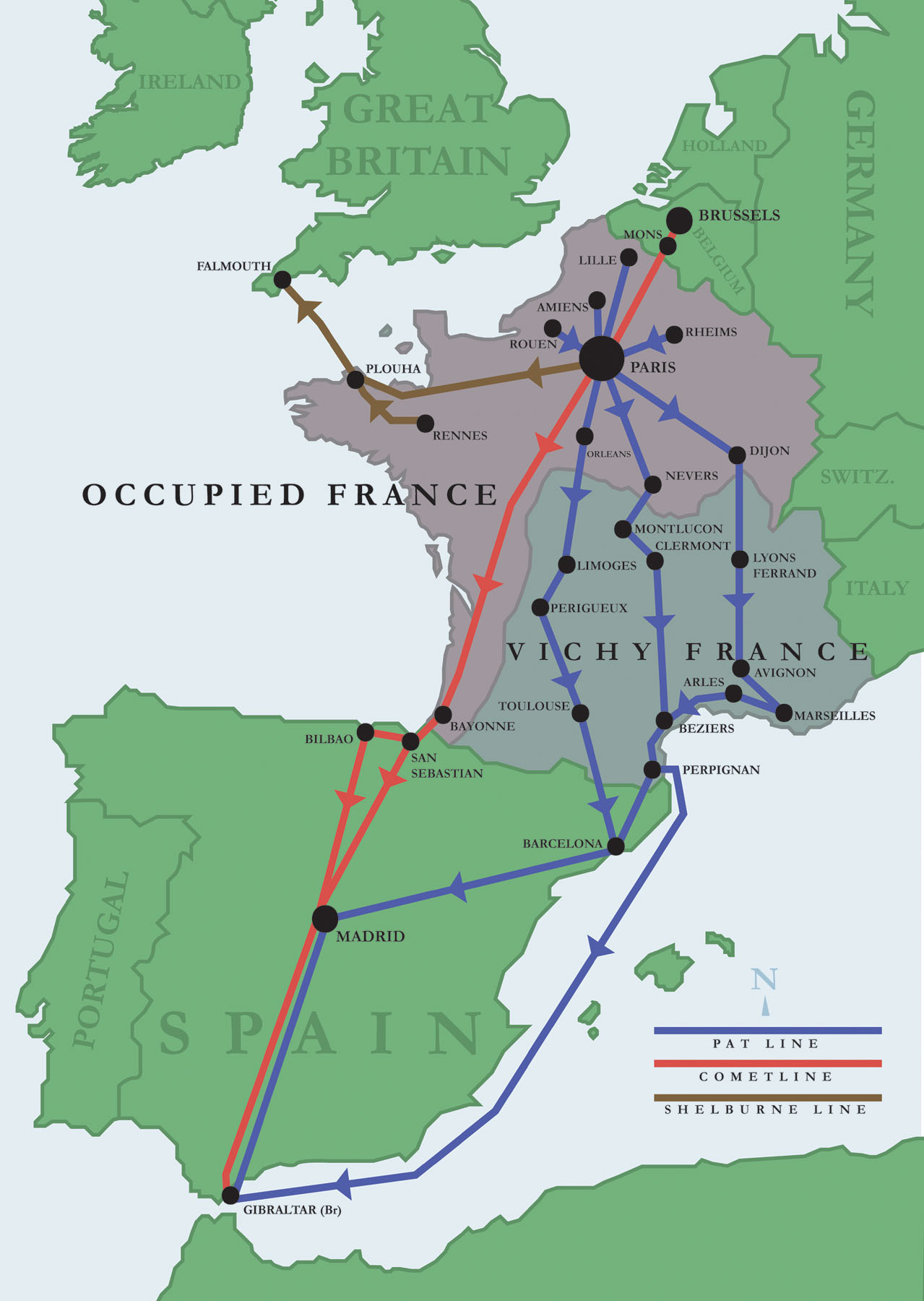
The routes used by the Comet and other lines to smuggle airmen out of occupied Europe.

The Comet Line's route crossing the Pyrenees to Spain.

The arrest of Arnold Deppé in August 1941 introduced a note of caution into the Comet Line. Andrée de Jongh decided that Belgium was unsafe for her and moved to Paris. Initially, her father, Frederic (code name "Paul"), the headmaster of a primary school, took over the operation in Belgium. His job was to rescue shot-down airmen, install them in safe houses, provide them with false identity documents, European clothing, training in European mannerisms and an escort who would accompany them to Paris or all the way to Spain. Andrée de Jongh was the most frequent escort; she escorted one group of three airmen in October 1941, another group of three in November, and two groups totaling 11 men in December 1941. That level of activity continued in 1942. MI9 officer Airey Neave described Andrée de Jongh as "one of our greatest agents". De Jongh made 24 round trips across the Pyrenees, escorting 118 airmen. Other persons who frequently escorted shot-down airmen across the border included Alfred Edward Johnson ("B"), an English handyman living with the de Greefs.

The Comet line used Basques, often smugglers accustomed to crossing the French–Spanish border surreptitiously, to guide airmen across the dangerous border which was guarded by French and Spanish police and German soldiers. The favorite guide was Florentino Goikoetxea who was wanted by the French and the Spanish police. The German police, both military and security, intensified efforts to shut down the escape organizations moving airmen as Allied bombing of Europe and Germany increased.

The Comet Line had three nerve centers: Brussels, Paris and southwestern France. With the Germans closing in on the Comet Line in Belgium, De Jongh's father, Frederick ("Paul"), fled to Paris on April 30, 1942, to join his daughter. He took over management of the Paris center. Three leaders of the Comet Line in Belgium were arrested six days after his flight. Picking up the pieces, the Comet Line leader in Belgium then became Jean Greindl ("Nemo"), 36 years old, the director of a charity called the "Swedish Canteen". Nemo organized a system for collecting the ever-increasing number of airmen throughout Belgium and preparing them for escape. Escorts under Nemo's direction accompanied airmen from Brussels to Paris. Nemo's principal escort to Paris for airmen until her arrest in the summer of 1942 was Andrée Dumon ("Nadine"), 19 years old. "Nadine" survived the war in German concentration camps and described her experiences in her book Je Ne Vous Ai Pas Oubliés.

When airmen arrived in Paris, the de Jonghs took over, providing them with safe houses and false documents and with an escort, usually Andrée de Jongh, who took them to southwestern France by train, a distance of about 700 km (430 miles). In Bayonne or Saint-Jean-de-Luz the airmen were met, usually by Elvire de Greef or her teenage daughter, Janine. From there, the airmen, a Basque guide and their escort would journey over the Pyrenees to Spain, initially by bicycle and then on foot. In San Sebastián, Spain, a car from the British consulate would meet the airmen and drive them to Madrid and onward to Gibraltar. Donald Darling ("Sunday") met and interrogated the escapees when they arrived in Gibraltar and arranged for their transport to Britain, usually by airplane. While the airmen proceeded onward, de Jongh (or after her arrest, another escort) met in San Sebastián with British diplomat Michael Creswell, ("Monday"), who gave her money for the Comet Line's expenses and messages to take back to France. After the arrests of Andrée and Frederick de Jongh, Jean-François Nothomb became the leader, based in Paris, of the Comet Line.

In spring 1944, with the Allied invasion of France looming, the Comet Line, in consultation with MI9, decided to stop removals and instead gather airmen into forest camps where they could await the arrival of the Allied armies. American Virginia d'Albert-Lake and her French husband Philippe assisted in gathering airmen in the Fréteval forest in Operation Marathon. The final escapees were mostly Comet Line members running from last-minute German purges. Elvire De Greef and her two children crossed the border into Spain on June 6, 1944. The final operation of the Comet Line was on September 28, 1944, when De Greef, back in liberated France, accompanied four Allied airmen on a flight from Biarritz to England.

Young people, especially young women, working for the Comet Line often dressed, behaved, and carried false identity cards that described them as students and stated their age as several years younger than they actually were. The theory was that young women were less likely to be regarded with suspicion by the Germans. For example, one of Andrée de Jongh's false identity cards gave her the name "Denise Lacroix" and listed her birthdate as 7 July 1924, almost eight years younger than she was.

== A typical exfiltration ==
Participation in the escape networks was arguably the most dangerous form of resistance work in occupied Europe...The most perilous job of all was handled mostly by young women, many of them still in their teens, who escorted the servicemen hundreds of miles across enemy territory to Spain.

My name is Andrée...but I would like you to call me by my code name, which is Dédée, which means little mother. From here on I will be your little mother, and you will be my little children. It will be my job to get my children to Spain and freedom.

— Andrée de Jongh to downed airmen.

The work of the Comet Line was labor intensive. One escapee estimated that "at least thirty-five people" were involved in his escape to Spain. The story of the escape of one Canadian airman illustrates the complexity and the large number of people involved in the operation of the Comet Line. Most of the escapes carried out during the war were similar to the following, each of them using many helpers and guides.

On December 9, 1942, Sergeant Sydney Smith was a crew member of a Vickers Wellington bomber shot down near Sergines, France. He evaded capture and a farmer, Emile Cochin, gave him a place to stay for the night and contacted an English-speaking woman, Madeleine de Brunel de Serbonnes. She took Smith to her home where he stayed until December 14. A dentist named Mr. Bolusset provided civilian clothing that fit Smith. Smith was transported to Paris by train by Catherine Janot, a law student and daughter of de Serbonnes. A medical doctor, Jean de Larebeyrette, preceded them on an earlier train to Paris to ensure no German checkpoints were along the route as Smith had no French identification papers.

In Paris, Smith was housed in the de Serbonnes family apartment. On December 15, Catherine Janot asked a Canadian medical student named Bernard Courtenay-Mayers for help and he referred her to a Jesuit priest named Michel Riquet. Riquet told Janot that she would be visited by people who would help Smith escape to Spain. That evening Comet Line members Robert Ayle and Andrée de Jongh came by the de Serbonnes apartment to meet Smith and verify his bona fides as an Allied airman. On December 16, de Jongh took Smith to a photographer to get photos to have identification papers forged for him.

On December 20, Smith left Paris by train with de Jongh, Janine De Greef and two Belgians fleeing the Germans. Arriving in Bayonne, they ate at a restaurant known to the Comet Line. From there they continued (probably by bicycle) to the village of Urrugne, near the Spanish border and the country home of Francia Usandizanga, a Basque helper of the Comet Line. Usandizanga sent 17-year-old Janine de Greef away because of the danger from Germans. The next day, December 23, Smith, two other airmen, de Jongh, and a Basque guide, Florentino Goikoetxea, walked across the Pyrenees to San Sebastián, Spain. In San Sebastián, Smith and the other airmen stayed at the house of Federico Armendariz. The airmen were picked up by a British diplomatic car and driven to Madrid, then continued on to Gibraltar where on January 21 they boarded a ship, arriving in Scotland on January 26. The rescue of Smith went smoothly without complications; many of those mentioned above who helped him would later be punished. Robert Ayle was executed by the Germans; Usandizanga died in a German concentration camp; Goikoetxea was shot and wounded by German soldiers; de Jongh and Riquet were imprisoned in German concentration camps; and Janot fled France.

== Arrests and betrayals ==
In November 1942 the escape lines became more dangerous when southern France was occupied by the Germans and the whole of France came under direct Nazi rule. Also in November, the Abwehr (German military intelligence) dealt a heavy blow to the Comet Line. The Maréchal family hid airmen in their home in Brussels and the house became a meeting place for members of the line. Two men persuaded a Comet Line helper that they were American airmen and were taken to the Maréchal home. The men were Germans and the Abwehr raided the home, arrested the Maréchals, including 18-year old Elsie, and many other helpers of the Comet Line. The information gained by the Germans enabled them to blow the Comet Line in Belgium. A hundred people in Brussels were arrested, among them, on 1 December 1942; the treasurer Baron Jacques Donny, having been betrayed, was arrested at his home at night and later sentenced to death on 10 October 1943 and executed by shooting in Stuttgart on 24 February 1944. He was known by the early evaders as Father Christmas as he brought them parcels of new clothes to wear.

The next blow was when Andrée de Jongh was arrested January 15, 1943, in Urrugne, the closest French town to the Spanish border. She was probably betrayed by a farm worker. Although she was interrogated many times by the Gestapo and German military intelligence, the Nazis didn't believe that this young, slight woman was anything more than a minor helper of airmen. Dédée, as she was universally called, spent the rest of the war in German prisons and concentration camps but survived.

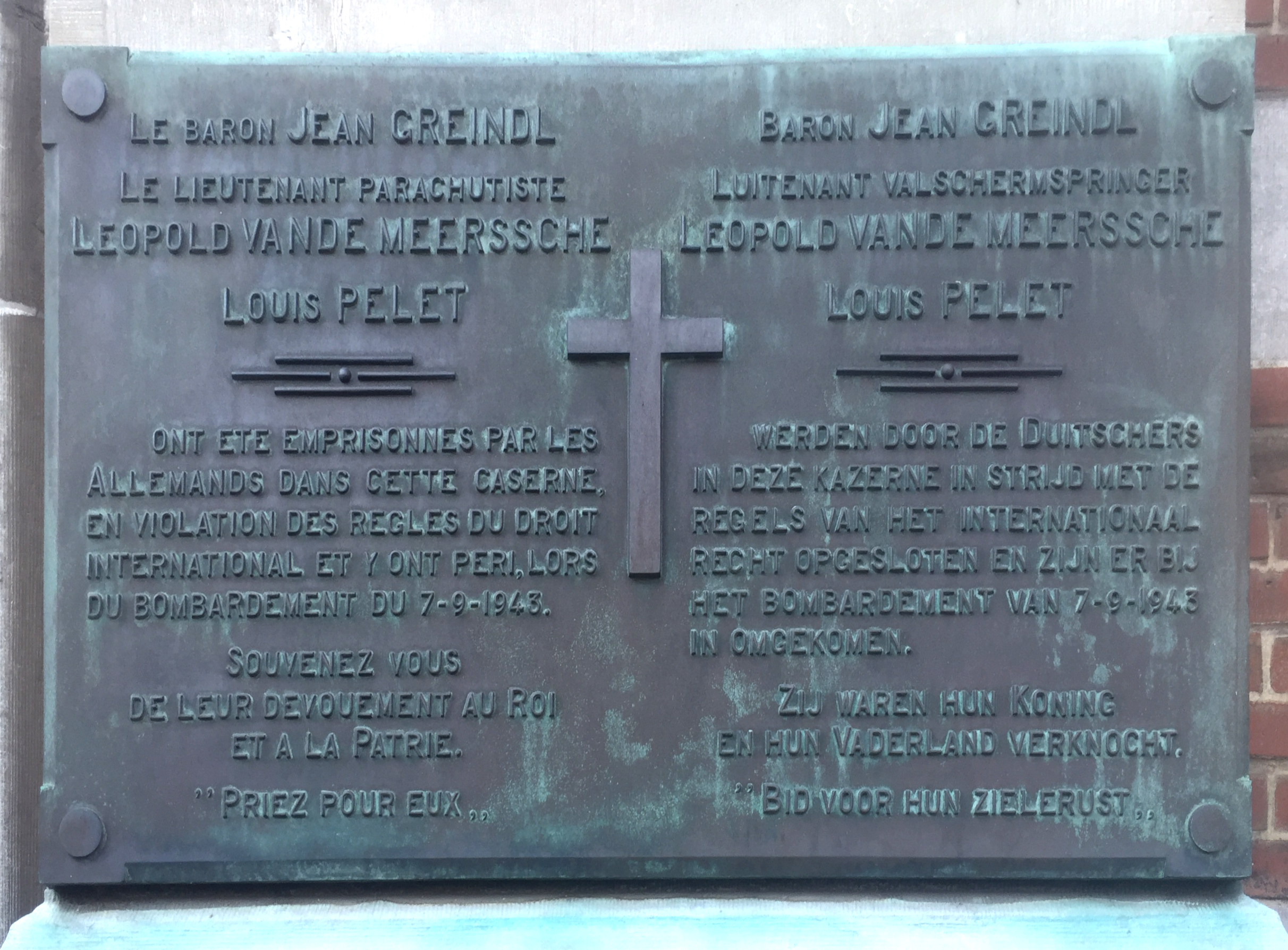
A plaque honoring Jean Greindl ("Nemo") in Brussels.

On February 6, 1943, the Comet Line leader in Belgium, Jean Greindl ("Nemo"), was arrested in Brussels. While in a German military prison he was killed in an Allied air raid. With these losses, the Comet Line did not move anyone during February 1943 but in March normal operations began again with Jean-François Northomb ("Franco") replacing Andrée de Jongh as the principal escort to Spain of airmen. In June 1943, the Comet Line was blown again. An infiltrator led the Germans to arrest major leaders of the Line in Paris and Brussels. Among those arrested were Dédèe's father, Frederic ("Paul"), who was arrested in Paris on June 7, 1943, and executed on March 28, 1944. From the ashes of Comet emerged three new leaders. A British agent, Jacques Legrell ("Jerome"), took charge in Paris and Antoine d'Ursel ("Jacques Cartier") reconstituted the Brussels center. Michelle Dumon ("Michou" or "Lily"), 22 years old and a sister of Nadine, was a bold and experienced helper.

The new leaders of the Comet Line in mid-1943 did not survive for long. On December 24, 1943, d'Ursel ("Jacques Cartier") drowned in the river Bidasoa which was the border of France and Spain. Legrelle was arrested by the Gestapo in an apartment in Paris on January 17, 1944, and Northomb was arrested in the same apartment on January 18. Both were tortured but survived the war. With the invasion of Europe on June 6, 1944, approaching, the need for a functioning Comet Line to rescue increasing numbers of fugitive airmen was crucial. In March 1944, the British diplomat Creswell met with Elvire de Greef (Tante Go), Michelle Dumon, and Marcel Roger ("Max") in Madrid to plan for the role of a new Comet Line. Roger took on the job of escorting airmen from Paris to southwestern France. Dumon worked with him and in Paris. The de Greef family continued to facilitate border crossings. MI9 sent in an operative named Jean de Blommaert ("Thomas Rutland") to run the center in Paris. An American woman, Virginia d'Albert-Lake and her French husband, Philippe, worked with the Comet Line until she was arrested by Germans in June 1944. She was sent to a concentration camp but survived the war.

A young Belgian man, Jacques Desoubrie, working for the Germans, infiltrated the Comet Line and was responsible for many of the arrests of its members. Michelle Dumon exposed him as a German agent in May 1944. Given the number of people involved in the Comet Line and its inability to vet effectively their volunteers and airmen to determine their bona fides, the line was vulnerable to infiltration by German agents.

Hundreds of members of the Comet Line were betrayed and arrested by the Geheime Feldpolizei and the Abwehr; after weeks of interrogation and torture at places such as Fresnes Prison in Paris, they were executed or labelled Nacht und Nebel (Night and Fog or NN) prisoners. NN prisoners were deported to German prisons and many later to concentration camps such as Ravensbrück concentration camp for women. Men were sent to Mauthausen-Gusen concentration camp, Buchenwald concentration camp and Flossenbürg concentration camp. Prisoners sent to these camps included Andrée de Jongh; Elsie Maréchal (Belgian Resistance); Andrée Dumon, sister of Michelle Dumon; and Virginia d'Albert-Lake (American).

== Statistics ==
The great majority of allied airmen shot down over Germany or occupied Europe were killed or taken prisoners by the Germans. The authors of the official history of MI9 cite 2,373 British and Commonwealth servicemen and 2,700 Americans (mostly airmen) reaching Britain by escape lines, including Comet, during the Second World War. The Royal Air Forces Escaping Society estimated that 14,000 helpers worked with the many escape and evasion lines by 1945.

== Routes ==
A typical Comet Line route was from Brussels or Lille to Paris and then via Tours, Bordeaux, Bayonne, over the Pyrenees to San Sebastián in Spain. From there evaders travelled to Bilbao, Madrid and Gibraltar. There were three other main routes, used by other lines. The Pat Line route (after founder Albert Guérisse (code name: Pat O'Leary) ran from Paris to Toulouse via Limoges and then over the Pyrenees via Esterri d'Aneu to Barcelona. Another Pat Line route ran from Paris to Dijon, Lyons, Avignon to Marseille, then Nîmes, Perpignan and Barcelona, from where they were transported to Gibraltar. A third route from Paris (the Shelburne Line) ran to Rennes and then St Brieuc in Brittany, where airmen were clandestinely taken by boat to Dartmouth.

== Notable members of the Line ==
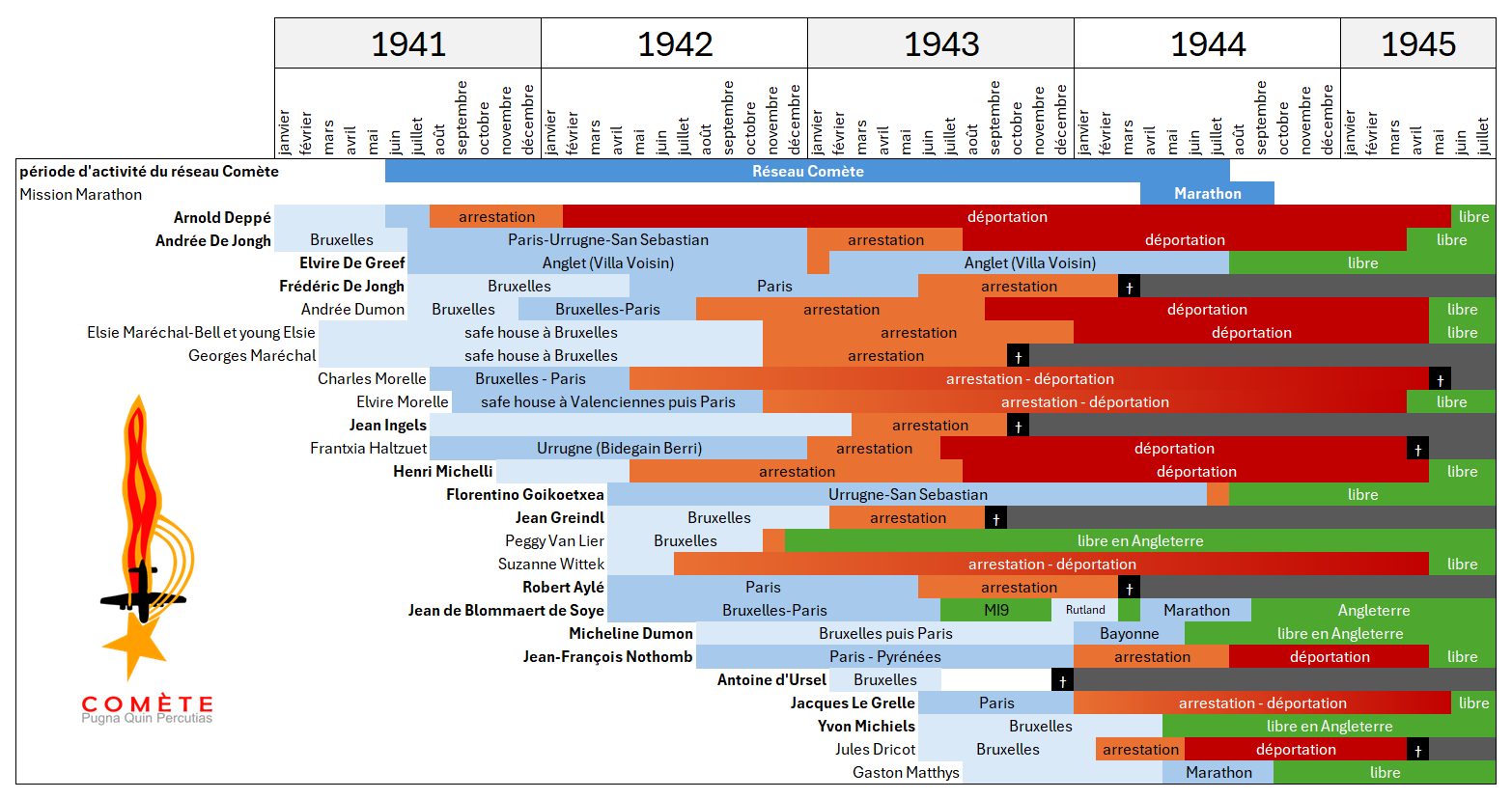
Principal members of the Comet Line

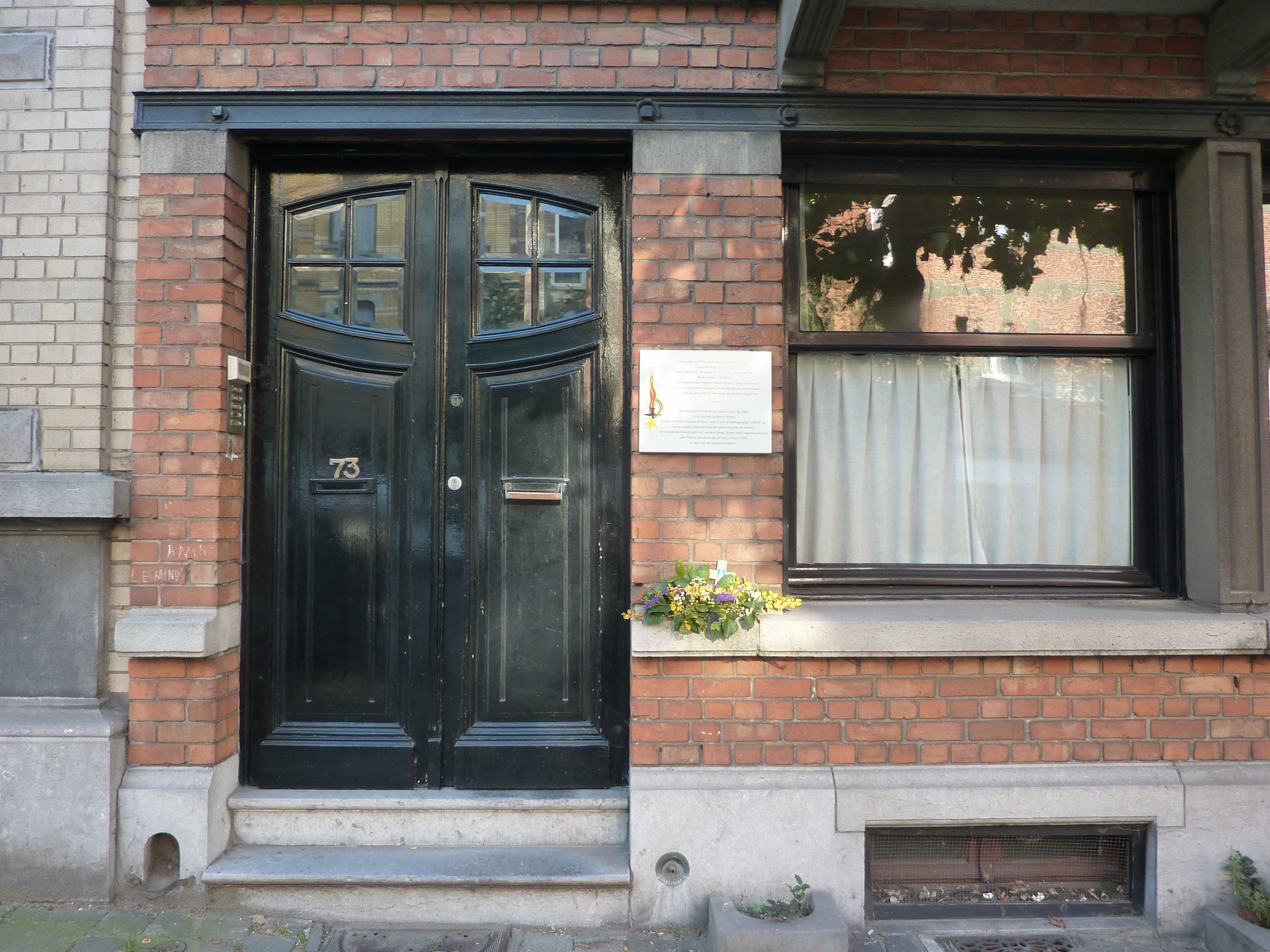
Schaerbeek – Avenue Émile Verhaeren n°73 – The de Jongh house in Brussels

- Kattalin Aguirre, a French Basque widow who, along with her teenage daughter Josephine (Fifine), assisted flyers in Saint-Jean-de-Luz, near the border with Spain.
- Elisabeth Barbier, worked as a member of the Comet Line in Paris in 1942 before working with Val Williams (Oaktree line) and then starting the Reseau Vaneau. Arrested in 1943 and sent to Ravensbrück until liberated in 1945.
- Michael Creswell (also known as "Monday"), British diplomat in Spain who met airmen when they arrived in Spain and conducted them to Gibraltar from where they were flown back to Britain.
- Virginia d'Albert-Lake, American citizen who lived in Paris and sheltered airmen in her home. Arrested in June 1944 and survived imprisonment in Ravensbrück.
- Donald Darling, (also known as "Sunday") MI9 officer in Portugal and later Gibraltar who repatriated airmen to Britain.
- Monique de Bissy, arrested in March 1944, freed in September 1944.
- Jean de Blommaert, headed Operation Marathon in 1944.
- Andrée de Jongh (also known as Dédée and Postman), Line co-creator and leader. Arrested 15 January 1943. Survived several Nazi concentration camps. Awarded the George Medal.
- Frédéric de Jongh (also known as Paul), Dédée's father. Arrested 7 June 1943 and executed 28 March 1944.
- Elvire De Greef (also known as Tante Go, Auntie Go), leader in southwestern France. Avoided arrest and survived. Awarded the George Medal. Her husband Fernand, and children Frederick and Janine assisted her.
- Janine de Greef. Teen-age guide for escaping pilots.
- Baron Jacques Donny (also known as Father Christmas), Line Treasurer. Arrested 1 December 1942 at night in his home. Sentenced 10 October 1943. Executed 29 February 1944.
- Arnold Deppé cofounder of the Comet Line. Arrested August 1941, survived imprisonment.
- Andrée Dumon (also known as Nadine), sister of Michelle Dumon. Arrested 1942, survived imprisonment.
- Michelle Dumon (also known as Micheline, Michou, and Lily), sister of Andrée Dumon. Versatile, "odd job" helper; evaded arrest despite long service; awarded the George Medal.
- Antoine d'Ursel (also known as Jacques Cartier), succeeded Greindl as leader in Brussels. Died of drowning crossing Franco-Spanish border 24 December 1943.
- Florentino Goikoetxea, Basque smuggler and a guide for many airmen across the Pyrenees from occupied France to neutral Spain. Awarded George Medal.
- Miguel Etulain, a French Basque child who worked on Florentino Goikoetxea's farm. He would meet allies at the nearby train station and walk them 5 miles to the farm's safehouse. He was 12 years old when his employer joined the Comet Line.
- Baron Jean Greindl (also known as Nemo), head of line in Brussels. Arrested 6 February 1943. Killed in an Allied air raid on 7 September 1943.
- Henriette Hanotte (also known as Monique Hanotte), "Walked 140 airmen to freedom", awarded MBE.
- Albert Edward Johnson (also known as "B"), British "gardener" of the De Greef family who led many airmen across the Pyrenees to Spain.
- Jacques Le Grelle (also known as Jerome), organised and operated line in the Paris area, linked the Belgium part of line to south of France. Was captured, tortured, sent to concentration camps and survived. Awarded the George Medal.
- Elsie Maréchal, British-born, she and her family were captured by the Germans in November 1942. Survived the war, as did her daughter Elsie, in concentration camps.
- Elvire Morelle, Belgian guide. Broke her leg during an operation. Imprisoned in 1942 and survived.
- Jean-François Nothomb (also known as Franco), succeeded Andrée de Jongh as leader, based in Paris. Arrested 18 January 1944. Survived several Nazi prisons. Awarded the Distinguished Service Order.
- Amanda Stassart (also known as Diane). Captured in 1944 and liberated in 1945.
- Francia Usandizanga, Basque, she operated a safe house near Spanish border. Captured and killed in prison.
- Peggy van Lier (also known as Michele). South-African born. Guide and assistant to Jean Greindl (Nemo) in Brussels. Fled Belgium in 1942.
- Rosine Thérier Witton (also known as Rolande), operated a safe house in Arras and served as a guide on the Arras–Paris section of the line (March–July 1943) and the Paris–Bordeaux section of the line (July 1943 – January 1944). Arrested January 1944 and sent to Ravensbrück and then Flossenburg; liberated May 1945.

== In popular literature ==
- Return Journey by Major A. S. B. Arkwright includes a first-hand account of three British officers who were escorted to freedom by the line after escaping from a POW camp.
- In the book Masters of the Air: America's Bomber Boys Who Fought the Air War Against Nazi Germany, Donald L. Miller describes the zealously maintained Comet Line line by young men and women.
- Riding the Comet is a stage drama by Mark Violi. The play focuses on a rural French family helping two American GIs return safely to London shortly after the D-Day invasion. This play premiered at Actors' NET of Bucks County, Pennsylvania in September 2011.

== See also ==
- The Nightingale (2015), by Kristin Hannah, a fictional French Resistance fighter named Isabelle Rossignol uses a passage through the Pyrenees much like the Comet Line
- Dutch resistance
- Escape and evasion lines (World War II)
- List of networks and movements of the French Resistance
- Secret Army, a BBC television series about a fictional resistance organization based heavily on the Comet Line
