= Frantxia Haltzuet =

Francisca Romana Halzuet Alzate
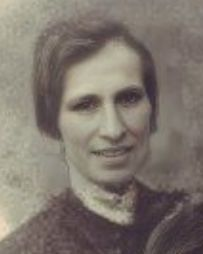
- Born: August 29, 1908; Bera, Navarre, Spain
- Died: April 12, 1945 (aged 36) Ravensbrück concentration camp
- Cause of death: Beating
- Allegiance: Comet Line
- Conflicts: World War II †
- Spouse: Filipe Usandizaga

Frantxia Haltzuet (Francia Usandizanga) was a Basque resistance fighter and member of the Comet line.

== Life before the war ==
Frantxia was born in Bera, Navarre, Spain on August 29, 1908, she married her husband, Filipe Usandizaga in 1930 and had three children. Her husband Filipe died in 1939.

== World War 2 ==
During World War 2 Frantxia joined the Comet Line, a Resistance organization that help smuggle allied troops from France and Belgium to Spain. Frantxia used her farmhouse in Urrugne where her three children lived and a Spanish refugee Juan Larburu. On January 13 1943 Frantxia was arrested alongside three British airmen in her farmhouse by the Gestapo she was deported to Ravensbrück concentration camp. She died on April, 12, 1945 from a beating by Nazi guards.

== Legacy ==
On April 12 2025, the 80th anniversary of her death, a school in Bera and the mayor of the town paid tribute to her and placed a plaque on lectern in honour of her and renamed Altzate square after her.
