= Amanda Stassart =

Amanda Stassart

Amanda "Mouchka" Stassart (1923–2013) was a member of the Resistance during World War II and later a president of the Belgian Association of Air Hostesses.

== Life ==
Stassart was born in Lausanne, Switzerland, to Belgian parents on 17 February 1923. She was sent to a Saint Vincent de Paul school in Belgium, living with a grandmother in Ixelles, while her parents worked in the United States. In 1936 she moved to live with her parents in Paris, where her father was working for General Motors. She enrolled at the University of Paris as a law student, but never graduated. In 1943 she joined the resistance, working as a courier and guide for the Comet Line escape network under the nom de guerre "Diane." She and her mother were betrayed in 1944. She was interrogated and tortured in the Gestapo headquarters in the Rue des Saussaies, held in Fresnes Prison, and then deported to Ravensbrück concentration camp, where her mother died in February 1945. Stassart was transferred to Mauthausen concentration camp, where she was liberated by the Red Cross on 22 April 1945. Only in 2000 did she discover that her father, who had also been involved in the resistance, had died in Mittelbau-Dora concentration camp.

In 1946 Stassart became a senior hostess for Sabena. In 1948 she visited the Freedom Train in New York and was flown to Memphis, Tennessee, to meet with airmen she had helped escape from occupied France. In 1954 she was in charge of running the Lady Sabena Clubhouse at the Sabena Air Terminus in Brussels. In 1955 she accompanied King Baudouin to the Belgian Congo, and she became Princess Paola's stewardess of choice on royal flights. Throughout her career at Sabena she was active in pushing for better conditions for female employees, in particular the right to keep their jobs after marriage, not be subject to a "beauty panel" for employment, and for parity of pay with male flight attendants. Retired from Sabena as a hostess upon her marriage to pilot Marcel Désir in 1969, in 1971 she co-founded Trans European Airways, where she worked as Head Supervisor of Cabin Service. In 1984 she was involved in Operation Moses, evacuating Ethiopian Jews to Israel.

In her later years she worked to maintain the memory of persecution and resistance during the Second World War. She died in Woluwe-Saint-Pierre on 4 January 2013, and was buried a week later.
