= James Langley =

James Maydon Langley
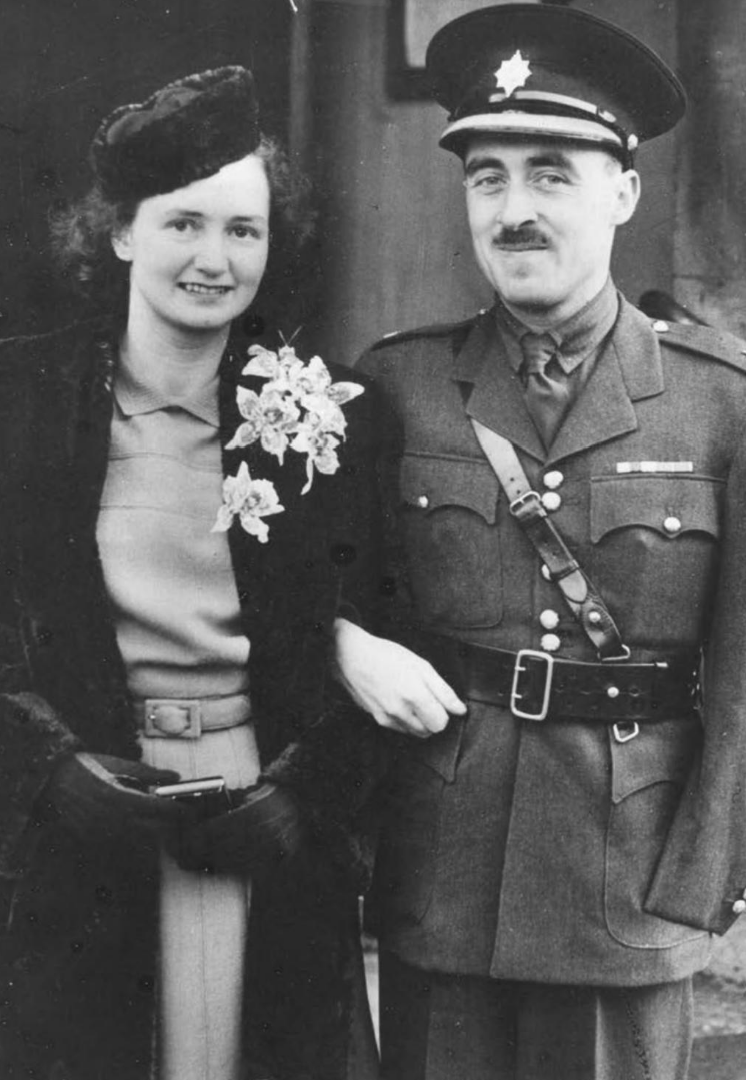
- James Langley at his wedding to Peggy van Lier in November 1943.
- Born: 12 March 1916; Wolverhampton, Staffordshire, England
- Died: 10 April 1983 (aged 67); Suffolk, England
- Military career
- Allegiance: United Kingdom
- Branch: British Army
- Service years: 1936–1946
- Rank: Lieutenant-Colonel
- Service number: 68294
- Unit: Coldstream Guards
- Conflicts: World War II
- Awards: Military Cross; Member of the Order of the British Empire
- Other work: Author, bookseller

Lieutenant-Colonel James Maydon Langley MBE MC (12 March 1916 – 10 April 1983) was an officer in the British Army, who served during World War II. Wounded and captured at the battle of Dunkirk in mid-1940, he later returned to Britain and served in MI9.

== Biography ==
Langley was born in Wolverhampton, the son of Francis Oswald Langley (1884–1947), a stipendiary magistrate, recorder and chancellor. He was educated at Uppingham School and Trinity Hall, Cambridge. Having served as a cadet under officer in the Uppingham School Contingent of the Junior Division of the Officers' Training Corps, he was commissioned as a second lieutenant in the Coldstream Guards (Supplementary Reserve) on 4 July 1936, and promoted to lieutenant on 4 July 1939.

Langley was mobilised on 24 August 1939 to serve in the 2nd Battalion, Coldstream Guards, part of the 1st Guards Brigade of the 1st Infantry Division, then commanded by Lieutenant-Colonel Lionel Bootle-Wilbraham, in the British Expeditionary Force (BEF). In early June 1940, during the battle of Dunkirk, he was seriously wounded in the head and arm. Unable to walk, he was left behind at a Casualty Clearing Station, where he was captured, and later had his left arm amputated by a German Army doctor. On 10 October he escaped from a hospital in Lille and made his way to Marseille. Like other British prisoners in the Vichy Zone Langley was held at Fort Saint-Jean, though this confinement was nominal, as they were only required to attend roll-call once a week, but were otherwise free. While in Marseille Langley worked as a courier for the escape line run by the Scottish officer Ian Garrow and Minister Donald Caskie. In February 1941 Langley was declared "unfit for further military service" by a Medical Board containing Dr. George Rodocanachi, and was repatriated in March.

On his return to England he was recruited by Claude Dansey into the Secret Intelligence Service (MI6) to serve as liaison officer between MI6 and MI9, where most of his work involved the support of escape and evasion lines in north-west Europe. MI9's role was to assist and finance escape and evasion lines in German occupied Europe, setting up reception centres, collating intelligence and organising the clandestine return of airmen and soldiers to the UK. The escape lines enabled about 7,000 downed airmen and stranded soldiers to escape occupied Europe. These operations extended to liberated POWs as their camps were overrun. It was also involved setting up "safe areas" such as Operation Marathon, behind enemy lines in which downed airmen could congregate until liberated, rather than risk breaking through the front line. The organisation was also involved in "Operation Pegasus" at Arnhem. He was promoted to captain (war substantive) on 30 October 1943, and to major on 14 April 1944, and then to acting lieutenant-colonel on 14 January 1944.

In January 1944 Langley was appointed to joint command of a new Anglo-American unit; Intelligence School 9 (Western European Area), which was attached to SHAEF during the western campaign of 1944–45. Langley was demobilised on 4 July 1946, being transferred to the Regular Army Reserve of Officers with the rank of lieutenant (war substantive major), retaining his seniority. He was promoted to major in the Reserves on 1 January 1949, eventually relinquishing his commission, having reached the age limit, on 12 March 1966, and was granted the honorary rank of lieutenant-colonel.

Post-war he worked for Fisons until 1967, then ran a bookshop in Suffolk with his wife, the former Peggy van Lier (1915–2000), a member of the Belgian "Comet line", whom he had married in 1944. They had four sons and a daughter.

Langley retired in 1976, and died in 1983.

Langley was portrayed by the actor Benedict Cumberbatch in the 2004 BBC series Dunkirk.

== Awards ==
On 20 December 1940 Langley was awarded the Military Cross "in recognition of gallant conduct in action with the enemy" in France, and on 29 April 1941 was made a Member of the Order of the British Empire (MBE) "in recognition of distinguished services in the field". On 2 August 1945 Langley received a mention in dispatches "in recognition of gallant and distinguished services in North West Europe".

== Publications ==
- Fight Another Day. Collins. 1974. ISBN 978-0-00-211241-3.
- MI9 : Escape and Evasion 1939–1945. The Bodley Head. 1979. ISBN 978-0-316-28840-8., with M. R. D. Foot.

== Bibliography ==
- Foot, M.R.D; Langley, J.M. (1979). MI9 : Escape and Evasion 1939–1945. London: The Bodley Head. ISBN 978-0-316-28840-8.
