= Jean Greindl =

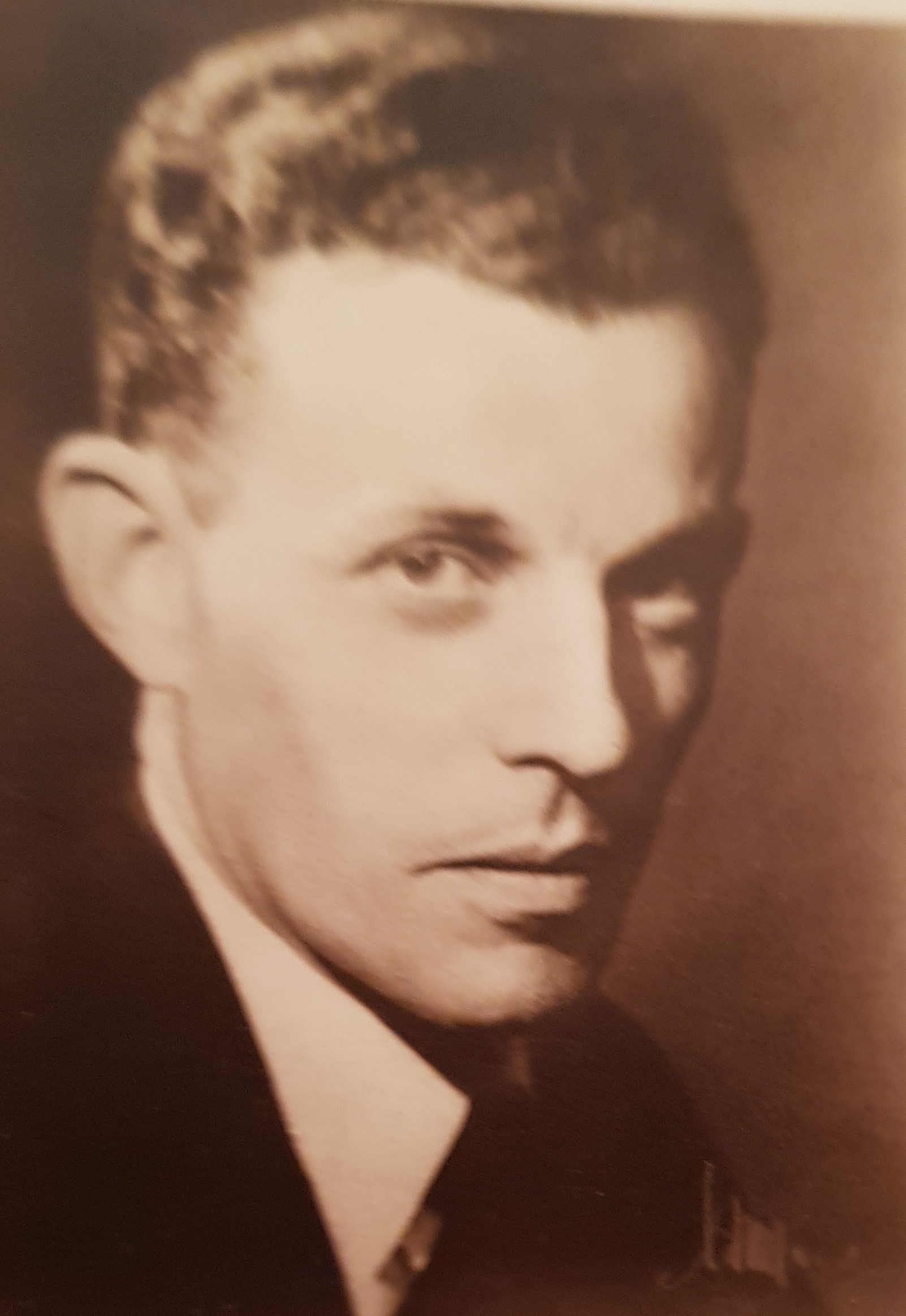

Baron Jean Greindl (born 10 April 1905, Brussels, died 7 September 1943, Etterbeek), code named Nemo, was a member of the Belgian Resistance. He became the leader of the Comet Line (Le Réseau Comète) in Belgium in April 1942. The Comet Line, made up of thousands of civilian volunteers, helped Allied airmen shot down over Nazi-occupied Europe evade capture and return to Britain via Spain. Arrested by the Germans in February 1943, Greindl was sentenced to death and imprisoned in the Etterbeek artillery barracks. He was killed in an American bombing raid on Etterbeek.

== Early life ==
Greindl was the second of five children of Paul Greindl and Isabelle de Burlet. In 1925, after completing his studies in agronomy, he traveled to the Belgian Congo where he worked on rubber plantations and established coffee plantations. In 1937, he married Baroness Bernadette Snoy d'Oppuers (born 1909) in Belgium. The couple returned to the Congo. In February 1940, Greindl and his wife and daughter Clair left the Congo to return to Belgium. World War II had begun. Greindl was exempt from military service because he was the eldest of five brothers. Belgium was invaded and conquered by Nazi Germany in May 1940. As an employee of the Ministry of Colonies, Greindl fled Belgium with other government officials to the Pyrenees in southern France, but returned to Belgium in August 1940.

== World War II ==
=== The Swedish Canteen ===
In early 1942, Greindl became head of what was called the Swedish Canteen in Brussels The canteen, supported financially by a Swedish woman who was friendly with the Germans, provided food and clothing to the poor children of Brussels. The canteen was located in a large, run-down house near the center of Brussels and in the same city block as the headquarters of the German occupiers. Greindl ran the canteen and its staff of volunteers with a maximum of order, efficiency, and style. His deputy was Peggy van Lier. Through van Lier, he became acquainted with Frederick de Jongh and his daughter Andrée. Andrée had been one of the founders of the Comet Line and regularly helped downed allied airmen evade German capture and guided them southward through France to neutral Spain. Greindl began to provide food to the Comet Line for the airmen hidden in Belgium until they could be depart for Spain.

=== The Comet Line ===
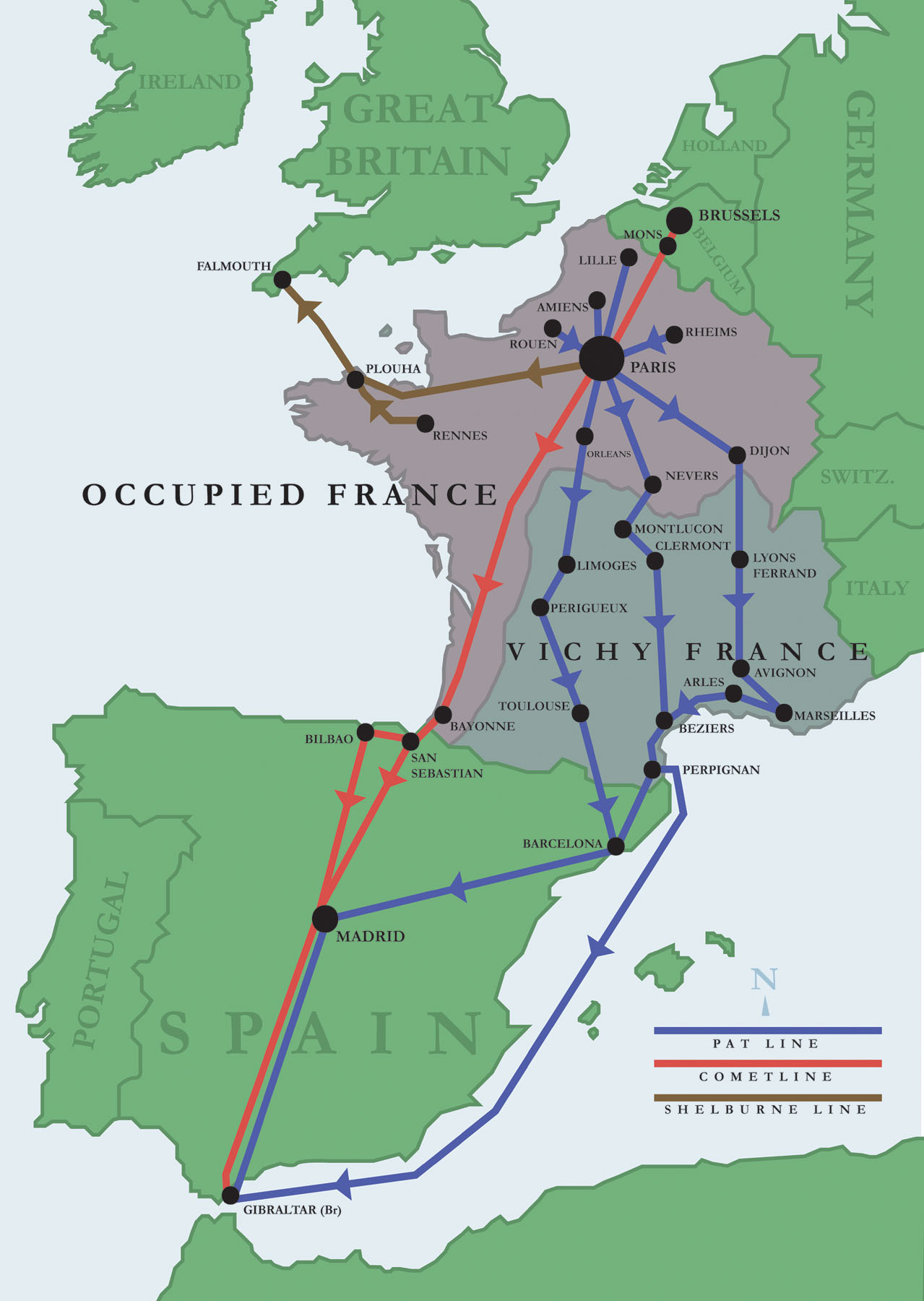
The routes used by escape lines to smuggle airmen out of occupied Europe.

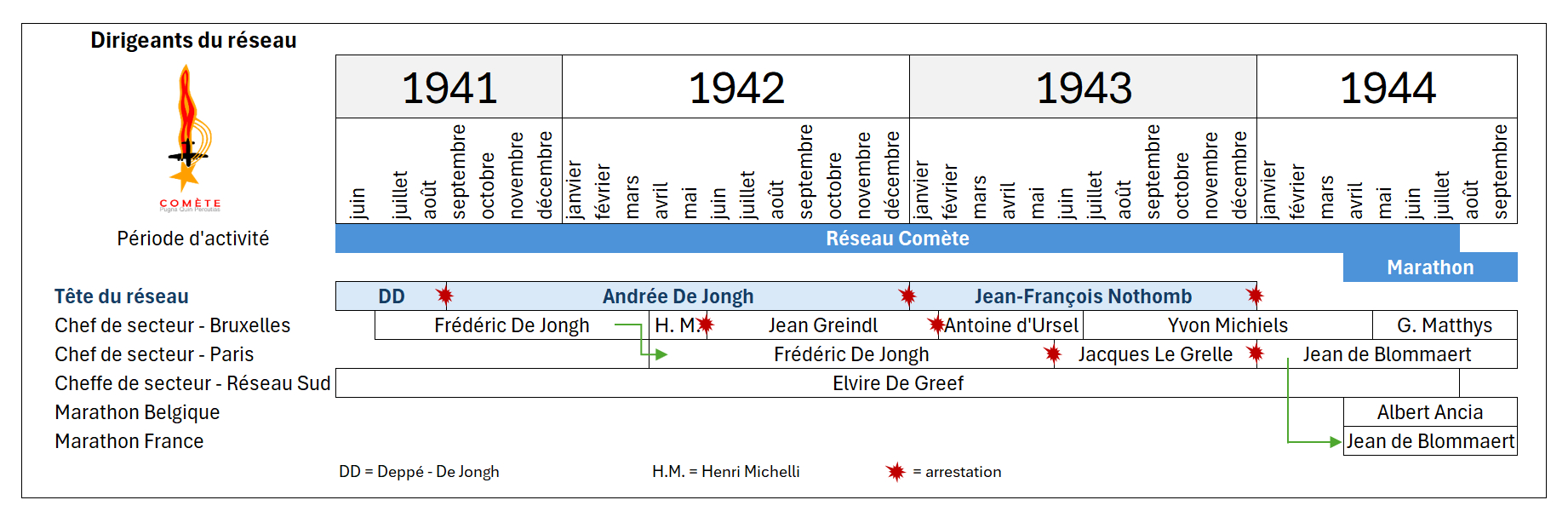
Comet Line leaders

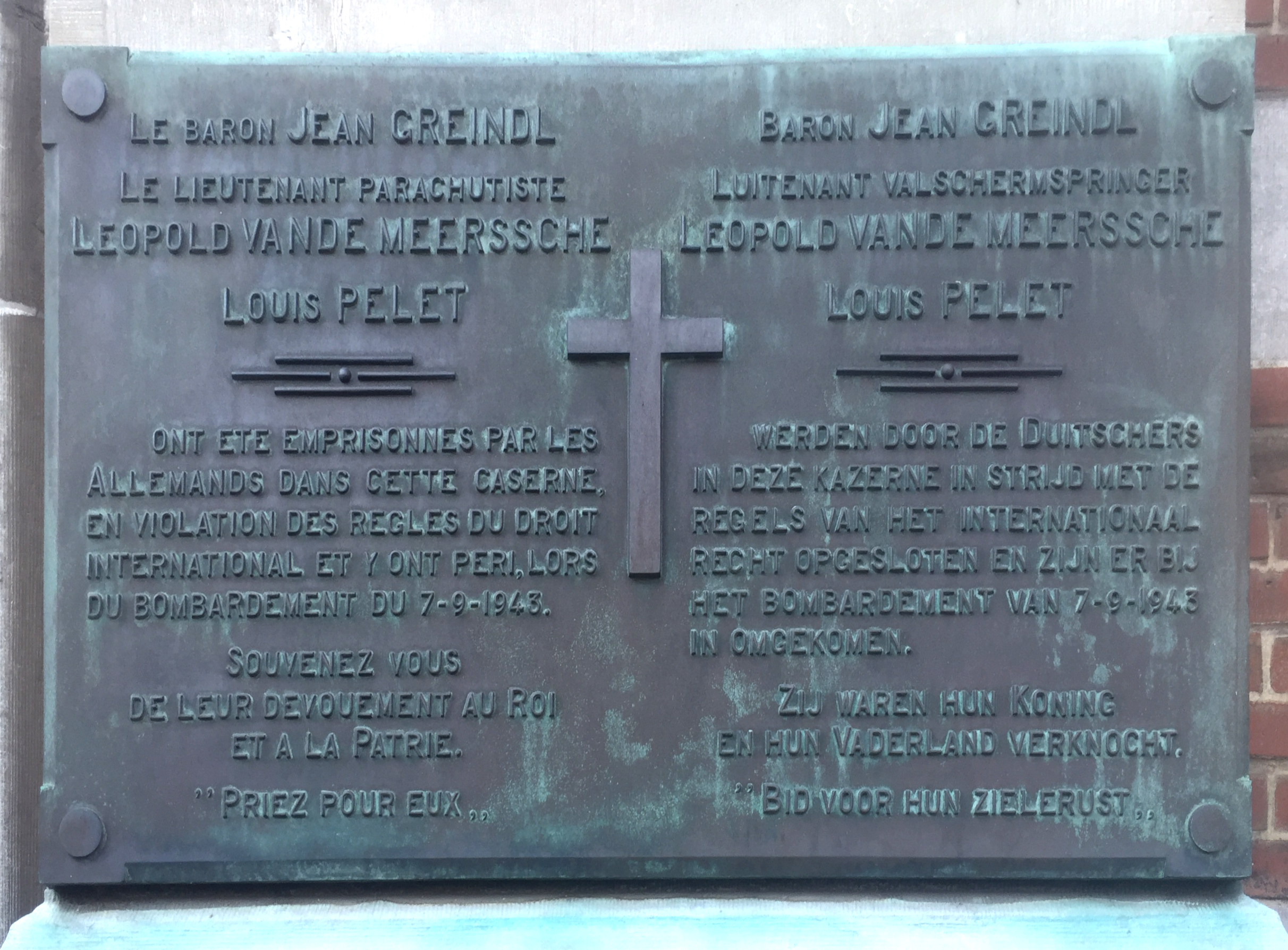
A plaque in Brussels honoring Greindl and others.

The Germans suppressed the Comet Line in Belgium and arrested many of its workers in 1941 and early 1942. On 30 April 1942 Frederick de Jongh fled Brussels to work in Paris and to join his daughter Andrée who had previously relocated to Paris. Henceforth, the de Jongh's would head the Comet Line in France (until their arrest and imprisonment); Greindl, who adopted the code name of Nemo, became the head of the Comet Line in Belgium. Andrée de Jongh opined that the situation in Belgium had become so dangerous that Greindl would likely not survive more than six months.

The Comet Line had begun as a grouping of friends dedicated to helping downed airmen evade German capture. As the air war over Europe intensified, the number of allied bombers shot down over Europe increased and the need for Comet and other escape lines to help the downed airmen increased. Greindl rebuilt Comet and interjected more order into its operations, now under continuous assault by German police and intelligence agencies. He divided Belgium into four sectors and expanded contacts with locals in each sector to coordinate the reception and treatment of airmen. He recruited more guides to accompany airmen from Belgium to Paris, where the Paris operatives of Comet took over.

In November 1942, the German Abwehr (military intelligence) arrested more than 100 Comet Line workers in Brussels. Again, Greindl set about to rebuild the line, but on 6 February 1943 he was arrested by the Germans in his office at the Swedish Canteen. He has been betrayed by a Roman Catholic priest, William Cracco, who had infiltrated the Comet Line. Greindl's brother, Albert, escaped safely to England but Greindl's wife and one-year-old daughter were also arrested and held for a week in a hospital. Later statements by his German captors said that Greindl was beaten and tortured by the Germans, but he told them nothing of importance. A German translator said, "I can confirm that the Baron Greindl always maintained a very dignified manner."

The Germans believed that Greindl was the most important leader of Comet, a distinction that properly belongs to de Jongh, also captured and imprisoned. In April 1943, he was condemned to death and in May he was transferred to the Etterbeek barracks near Brussels. His wife was permitted to visit him briefly every three weeks. His execution was delayed by a campaign to persuade the Germans to moderate the death sentence. In June Greindl and Andrée de Jongh, both prisoners of the Germans, saw each other briefly and de Jongh passed messages to him. On 7 September 1943 a bomb dropped by an American bomber on the Etterbeek barracks killed Greindl. The Americans were not aware that Greindl was imprisoned in the barracks. Two weeks later the Germans executed eleven colleagues who had worked with him.

== Honors ==
In 1946, Greindl was awarded the Croix de Guerre (Belgium) with Palm and the U.S. Medal of Freedom.
