= MI9 =

Department of British military intelligence (historical)

Military Intelligence, Section 9

Agency overview
- Formed: 23 December 1939
- Dissolved: 1945
- Agency executives: Norman Crockatt, Chief; Sam Derry, Chief
- Parent department: Directorate of Military Intelligence (United Kingdom)

MI9, the British Directorate of Military Intelligence Section 9, was a secret department of the War Office between 1939 and 1945. During World War II it had two principal tasks: assisting in the escape of Allied prisoners of war (POWs) held by the Axis countries, especially Nazi Germany; and helping Allied military personnel, especially downed airmen, evade capture after they were shot down or trapped behind enemy lines in Axis-occupied countries. During World War II, about 35,000 Allied military personnel, many helped by MI9, escaped POW camps or evaded capture and made their way to Allied or neutral countries after being trapped behind enemy lines.

The best-known activity of MI9 was creating and supporting escape and evasion lines, especially in France and Belgium, which helped 5,000 downed British, American and other Allied airmen evade capture and return to duty. The usual routes of escape from occupied Europe were either south to Switzerland or to southern France and then over the Pyrenees to neutral Spain and Portugal. MI9 trained Allied soldiers and airmen in tactics for evading and escaping and helped prisoners of war to escape by establishing clandestine communications and providing escape devices to them.

== Origin ==
MI9 officially came into being on 23 December 1939, led by Major (later Brigadier) Norman Crockatt, formerly of The Royal Scots (The Royal Regiment). In December 1941, a sub-section of MI9 became a separate department, MI19. At first MI9 was located in Room 424 of the Metropole Hotel, Northumberland Avenue, London. With limited space at the Metropole, a floor was also taken at the requisitioned Great Central Hotel, opposite Marylebone station, where World War II prison-camp escapees were debriefed and questioned about their journey home. After a German bomb caused slight damage to the Metropole Hotel in September 1940, Crockatt moved MI9 to a large country house, Wilton Park, Beaconsfield, Buckinghamshire.

MI9 initially received little financial support and was understaffed due to power struggles and personality clashes with MI6, the "oldest and grandest" of the British secret services. The assistant-head of MI6 was Claude Dansey, known as ACSS. Dansey maintained on behalf of MI6 considerable control over MI9, especially not wishing the upstart secret services such as MI9, the Special Operations Executive (SOE), and the Political Warfare Executive (PWE) to compete or interfere with the intelligence gathering function of MI6.

Two posthumously well-known sections of MI9 are Intelligence School 9, section d, known as IS9(d) or "Room 900," and "Q." Room 900 was staffed by James Langley and Airey Neave (code named "Saturday") who joined MI9 in 1941 and 1942 respectively. Both were soldiers who had escaped from German captivity. Langley and Neave were concerned with creating and supporting escape and evasion lines in Europe. "Q," staffed by Christopher Hutton and Charles Fraser-Smith, was charged with inventing devices to aid soldiers to evade or escape capture. "Q" was made famous in fiction by the James Bond movies.

== Escape lines ==
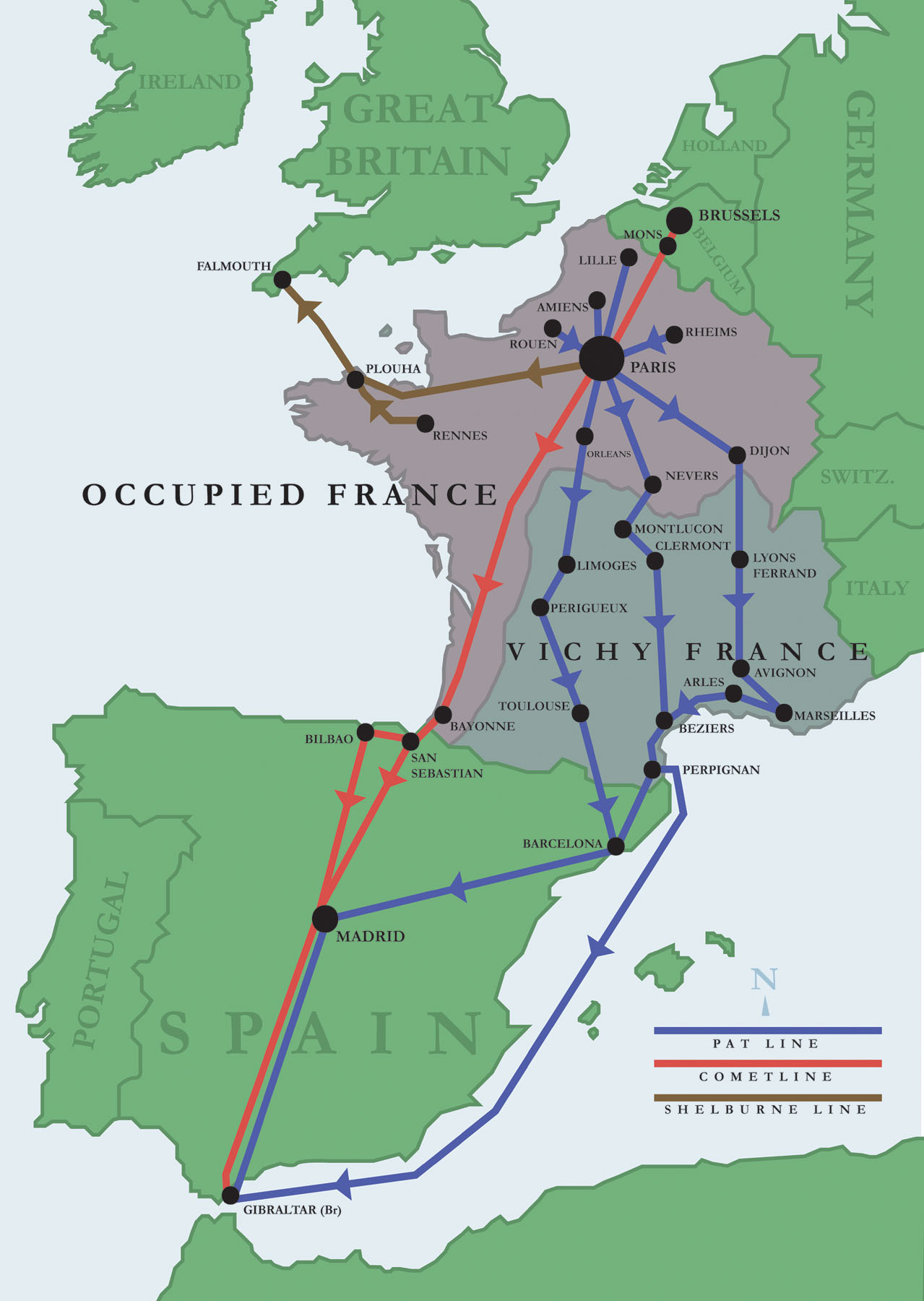
The escape lines used to smuggle Allied airmen out of occupied western Europe.

Escape lines for Allied soldiers and airmen stranded behind enemy lines were created after the Dunkirk evacuation in June 1940. Most of the British soldiers left behind were captured or surrendered, but about 1,000 soldiers stranded in France declined to surrender, evaded capture by the Germans, and eventually made their way back to Britain with the help of escape lines. Initially, escape lines were created and financed by the citizenry of France and Belgium who opposed the German occupation of their countries.

Many of the stranded soldiers made their way to Marseille in Vichy France, theoretically independent but a puppet state of Nazi Germany. Residents of Marseille created the Pat O'Leary Line to help the British soldiers in Marseille escape to neutral Spain, either by boat or by crossing the Pyrenees on foot. In July 1940, MI9 sent a young man named Donald Darling (code named "Sunday") to Spain and Portugal to help the fledging Pat line exfiltrate soldiers from France to Spain. In Nazi-occupied Belgium, Belgians created the Comet Line. MI9 became aware of Comet in September 1941 when a young woman, Andrée de Jongh, appeared unknown and unannounced at the British Consulate in Bilbao with a British soldier in tow whom she had guided through German-occupied France all the way from Belgium. She promised to bring more soldiers if MI9 paid the Comet Line's expenses. A British diplomat, Michael Creswell (code named "Monday"), became the chief contact of the Comet Line in Spain. Darling headed MI9 operations in Portugal and later in Gibraltar.

Working for the escape lines was arguably the most dangerous resistance activity in Europe and about one-half of the "helpers" (as they were called) were women, mostly young, who could travel with less difficulty and were less suspicious to the Germans than men. The Comet line initially rejected all MI9 assistance and advice except reimbursement for expenses (about $400 in 1942 U.S. dollars, or $8,000 in 2025 dollars, for each airman or soldier delivered to Spain). The Pat Line also received financial assistance from MI9 and beginning in April 1942 accepted wireless operators sent to France by MI9 to improve communications between Marseille and MI9 headquarters.

As Allied bombing of occupied Europe increased in 1942, the emphasis of the escape lines turned to rescuing and exfiltrating airmen who had been shot down or crashed in Nazi-controlled territory. The Germans succeeded in mostly destroying the Pat line and weakening the Comet line. Additional lines were created, sometimes at the initiative of MI9. MI9 created the Shelburne Escape Line which exfiltrated downed airmen by boat from the coast of Brittany to England and in Operation Marathon set up a secret camp to shelter downed airmen in a remote forest until they could be rescued by Allied forces after the successful Normandy invasion of France.

== Middle East ==
In late 1940, Lieutenant Colonel (later Brigadier) Dudley Clarke arrived in Cairo at the request of Commander-in-Chief, Middle East, General Sir Archibald Wavell. Clarke's main role was to manage military deception in the region. As cover for this secret mission, he was also assigned the job of managing MI9's presence in the Middle East. After Clarke set up his 'A' Force deception department this cover was extended to the entire office; and for a while 'A' Force represented MI9 in the region until later in the war when the two became separate once again.

== Escape aids ==
MI9 manufactured various escape aids that they sent to prisoner-of-war camps. Many of them were based on the ideas of Christopher Hutton. These included maps on silk and compasses.

MI9 used the services of former magician Jasper Maskelyne to design hiding places for escape aids including tools hidden in cricket bats and baseball bats, maps concealed in playing cards and actual money in board-games. Notably were maps hidden in Monopoly boards, and real money hidden in the piles of Monopoly money.

The British games manufacturer Jaques of London were commissioned by MI9 to produce a variety of games (from board games to sports) which contained numerous escape and evasion devices. These included travel and full sized chess sets, with contraband inside the wooden boards, the boxes or the chess pieces themselves, table tennis, tennis, badminton racquets containing money, maps and miniature compasses, dart boards filled with escape devices and tools, shove halfpenny boards, hollowed and filled with escape aids, and larger boxed games containing even more contraband. It was not until X-Ray machines were deployed at German POW camps, that the German authorities began to capture significant amounts of escape material.

== Post War ==
After hostilities ceased, Norman Crockatt retired, and handed the agency over to Sam Derry, who oversaw the administrative dismantling of the combat functions of MI9.

In 1959 23 Special Air Service Regiment (Reserve) was formed by re-naming of the Reserve Reconnaissance Unit, successors to MI9.

== Notable members ==
- Peter Baker
- Michael Bentine
- Peter Butterworth
- Donald Darling
- Charles Fraser-Smith
- Christopher Hutton
- James Langley
- Mary Lindell. agent in France
- Airey Neave
- Eric Newby, post-war
- Trix Terwindt, Dutch agent
- T. G. Wilson, agent in Ireland

The Staff of MI9 (At Wilton Park. Beaconsfield, Bucks. February 1940)

- Lt. Col. N. R. Crockatt (GSO1)
- Lt. Cdr. P. W. Rhodes R.N.
- Capt. C Clayton-Hutton (I.O.)
- Capt. H.B.A. de Bruyne (I.O.)
- Capt. L. Winterbottom
- Flt. Lt. A. J. Evans
- Major C. M. Rait (GSO3)
- Major V. R. Isham (GSO2)

== See also ==
- British Army Aid Group
- Comet Line – World War II Belgian Resistance organization
- Edgard Potier – Belgian airforce officer (1903–1944)
- Escape and evasion lines (World War II) – WW II network helping downed airmen to evade capture
- MI High – British children's TV series
- MI numbers – Department of the War Office (1873–1964)
- MIS-X – United States equivalent of the UK's MI9, the US equivalent of MI9
- Pat O'Leary Line – Resistance organization in France during World War II
- Shelburne Escape Line

== Bibliography ==
- Foot, M. R. D.; Langley, J. M. (24 May 1979). MI9 Escape and Evasion 1939–1945. The Bodley Head. ISBN 0-370-30086-6.
- Hutton, Clayton (1960). Official Secret: The Remarkable Story of Escape Aids, Their Invention, Production and the Sequel. London: Max Parrish.
- Holt, Thaddeus (2004). The Deceivers: Allied Military Deception in the Second World War. Scribner. ISBN 0-7432-5042-7.
- Rankin, Nicholas (1 October 2008). Churchill's Wizards: The British Genius for Deception, 1914–1945. Faber and Faber. p. 466. ISBN 978-0-571-22195-0.
