= Elsie Maréchal =

Belgian Resistance member (1894–1969)

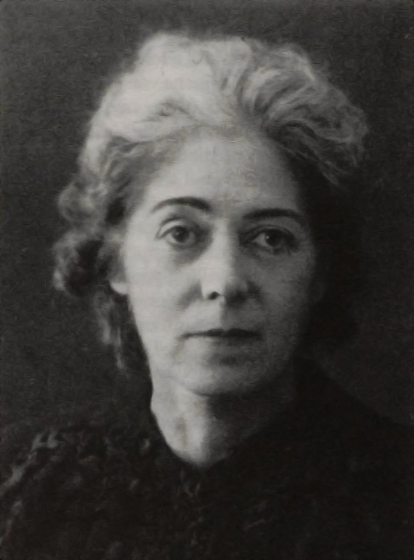
- Elsie Mary Maréchal in 1945.
- Born: Elsie Mary Bell; 21 June 1894; Acton, Middlesex, England
- Died: 25 March 1969 (age 74); Uccle, Belgium
- Citizenship: British
- Years active: 1941 – 1945
- Organization: Belgium Resistance (Comet Line)
- Known for: Belgium Resistance (Comet Line)
- Spouse: Georges Maréchal
- Children: Lilian Grace (deceased), Robert and Elsie
- Parent(s): Robert Edward Bell (father); Alice Mary (née Gowen) (mother)

Elsie Maréchal (21 June 1894 – 25 March 1969) was an English woman who became active in the Belgian Resistance during World War II. As a member of the Comet Line, she helped downed Allied airmen evade capture by German forces. After being betrayed in November 1942, she was sentenced to death and subjected to the 'Nacht und Nebel' policy designed to make such opponents of the Nazis 'disappear' in prison camps. She survived to tell her story to her family back in England and to receive awards for her work. Two of her children, Elsie and Robert, also survived prison, but her husband Georges was executed.

== Early life ==
Elsie Mary Bell was born on 21 June 1894 in Acton, Middlesex, the daughter of Robert Edward Bell and Alice Mary (née Gowen). After attending school in Great Yarmouth, Maréchal trained at Norwich Teacher Training College and, on leaving in 1915, was accepted as a teacher by the London County Council.

While working in London during the First World War she met a young Belgian soldier, Georges Maréchal, who had been sent to a hospital in London to recover after contracting pneumonia while serving in the water-logged trenches of South West Belgium. They were married on 21 June 1920 and started married life in Koblenz, Germany where Georges was working. They had three children: Lilian Grace, who died as a toddler, Elsie, born about 1924, and Robert, born about 1926. In 1929 Georges returned with his family to Brussels.

== World War II ==
Germany invaded Belgium in May 1940 and soon occupied the country. Georges Maréchal initially resisted the German occupation as a member of an intelligence network collecting information about the German occupation and passing it along to the British. The Maréchal family lived near the family of Andrée de Jongh in Brussels and they began to collaborate with de Jongh (code named "Dédée), the co-founder of what would become known as the Comet Line. The Comet Line was formed in 1941 to help Allied airmen who had been shot down over enemy territory evade capture and reach safety by smuggling them through France to neutral Spain. The two Elsies, mother and 18-year-old daughter, were bilingual in French and English and could communicate with downed airmen, few of whom could speak French.

One technique that the Germans used to infiltrate and capture Comet Line helpers was by having English-speaking Germans pose as downed pilots and betray those Belgians who were helping them. Few Comet Line helpers were fluent in English, so the two Elsies were invaluable in evaluating the bonafides of a man who claimed to be a downed allied airman. Working for the leader of the Comet Line in Brussels, Jean Greindl (code name "Nemo"), the older Elsie traveled around Brussels and vicinity to solicit help for the Comet Line from priests, academics and others, and the Maréchals sheltered downed airmen and other fugitives from the Germans in their home.

== Capture ==
They didn’t shoot the women. We were to die of misery, hunger and exhaustion. I felt that we had a horrible devil following us. But when we arrived at Ravensbrück, it was the worst. The first thing I saw was a cart with all the dead piled on it. Their arms and legs hanging out, and mouths and eyes wide open. They reduced us to nothing. We didn’t even feel like we had the value of cattle. You worked and you died.

— Elsie Maréchal (the younger) about Ravensbrück Concentration Camp

Elsie's daughter, also named Elsie

On November 19, 1942, two men claiming to be American airmen appeared at the door of the Maréchal home, brought there by a Comet Line helper. This was contrary to the usual practice of the Comet Line and the young Elsie was immediately suspicious as the two didn't appear "American" to her. Their behavior was odd. However, the two Elsies had had little contact with Americans and were unsure. After eating and being interviewed, the two airmen said they wanted to take a walk and get some air and departed. Young Elsie left the house to find "Nemo" for instructions. When the two "airmen" returned to the Maréchal house an hour later they came with pistols and arrested the older Elsie, and subsequently arrested the younger Elsie, Robert, and Georges Maréchal, taking them to Gestapo headquarters. A young man, Victor Michiels, sent to the Maréchal home by Nemo to check on them was shot to death by the Gestapo. The younger Elsie was beaten so badly that she could not lie on her back for weeks.

The day after the Maréchal's were arrested an important Comet Line guide, Elvire Morelle, was arrested when she came to the house. Following the arrest of the Maréchals and Morelle the German police arrested more than 100 members of the Comet Line in Brussels. The Comet Line nearly collapsed, especially after leaders Andrée de Jongh and Jean Greindl were arrested in January 1943 and February 1943 respectively. Young Robert Maréchal was released from prison in January 1943. Georges was executed on October 20, 1943. The two Elsies were declared Nacht und Nebel and were sent to Ravensbrück concentration camp in Germany, a "sentence to a slow death rather than a fast death by execution." In March 1945, the Maréchals among others were transferred to Mauthausen prison. From there they were taken by the Red Cross in convoy to Switzerland. and then back to Brussels, liberated by the Allies, arriving on May 1, 1945. The elder Elsie was said to have weighed only 30 kilograms (66 lb).

Maréchal died on 25 March 1969 in Uccle, Belgium. Both of the Maréchal children worked in the Belgian Congo after World War II. The younger Elsie lived in Rixensart near Waterloo, south of Brussels and died 22 June 2022, a few days after her 96th birthday.
