= Escape and evasion lines (World War II) =

WW II network helping downed airmen to evade capture

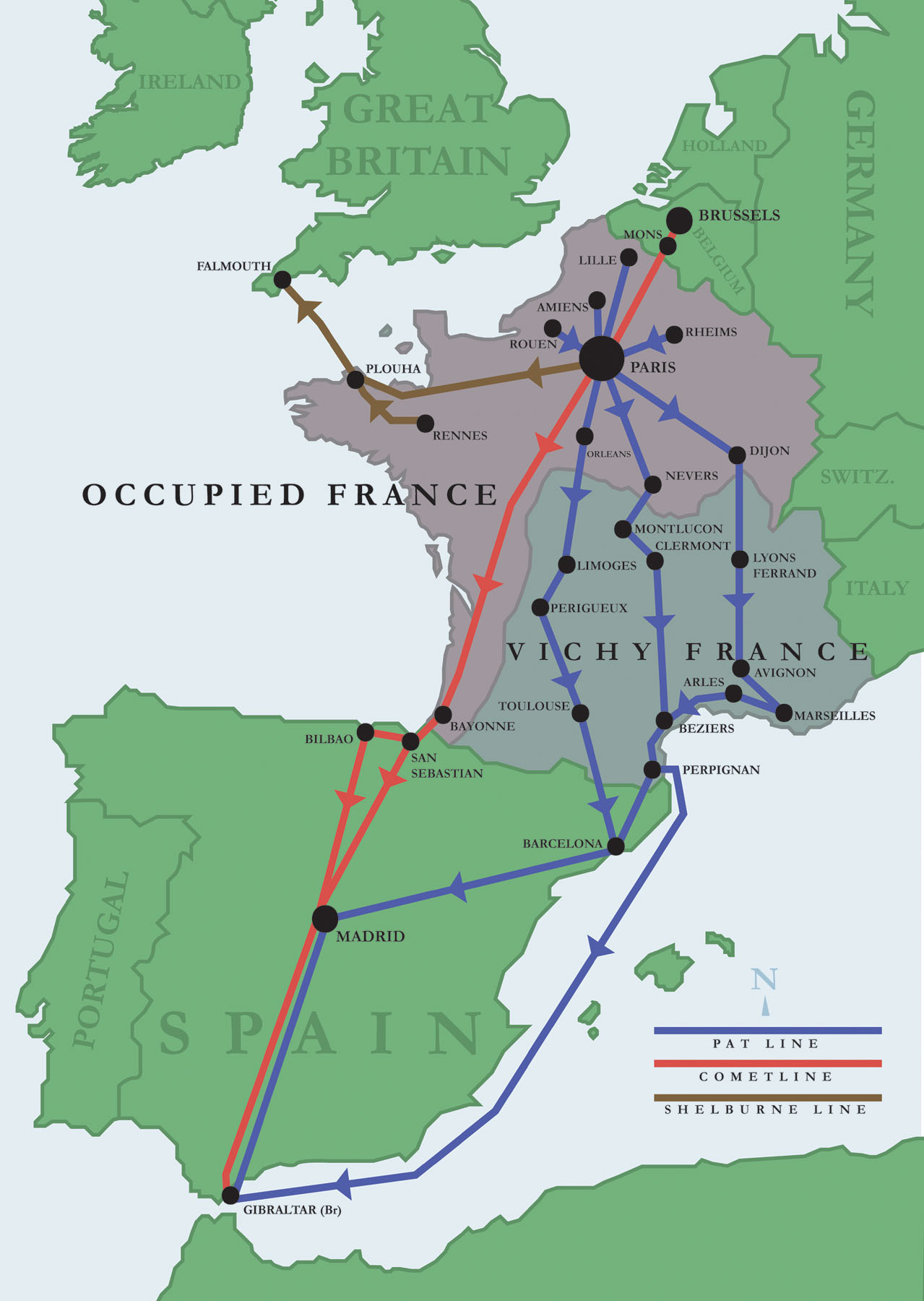
The routes used by the Pat, Comet, and Shelburne escape lines to smuggle airmen out of occupied Europe.

Escape and evasion lines in World War II helped people escape European countries occupied by Nazi Germany. The focus of most escape lines in Western Europe was assisting American, British, Canadian and other Allied airmen shot down over occupied Europe to evade capture and escape to neutral Spain or Sweden from where they could return to the United Kingdom. A distinction is sometimes made between "escapers" (soldiers and airmen who had been captured by the Germans and escaped) and "evaders" (soldiers and airmen in enemy territory who evaded capture). Most of those helped by escape lines were evaders.

Some escape and evasion lines such as the Shelbourne or Burgundy Lines were created by the Allies specifically to assist their soldiers and airmen stranded in German-occupied territory. Others were the product of a combination of allied military personnel and local citizens in occupied territory, such as the Pat O'Leary Line. Some escape lines were created and operated by civilians as grass-roots efforts to help people fleeing the Nazis, such as Comet, Dutch-Paris, Service EVA or the Smit-van der Heijden line. They did not restrict themselves to helping military personnel but also helped compromised spies, resisters, men evading the forced labor drafts, civilians who wanted to join the governments-in-exile in London, and Jews.

About 7,000 airmen and soldiers, mostly American, British and Canadian were helped to evade German capture in Western Europe and successfully returned to the United Kingdom during World War II. Many of the escape lines were financed in whole or part by MI9 of the British Directorate of Military Intelligence, the British Special Operations Executive (SOE), and other Allied organizations. "Participation in the escape networks was arguably the most dangerous form of resistance work in occupied Europe... The most perilous job of all was handled mostly by young women, many of them still in their teens, who escorted the servicemen hundreds of miles across enemy territory to Spain."

The escape and evasion lines described in this article specialized in helping allied soldiers and airmen evade German capture. Active in Vichy France were several international humanitarian organizations, mostly based in the United States, who as part of their work helped civilians, especially Jews, escape the Nazis. See: Refugee workers in Vichy France

== Description ==
The work of the escape lines was labor-intensive. Typically, downed airmen were found, fed, clothed, given false identity papers, and hidden in attics, cellars, and people's homes by a network of volunteers. Airmen were then accompanied by guides, also volunteers, to neutral countries. The most common routes were from Belgium and northern France to Spain. Travel through occupied France was mostly by train, followed by a crossing on foot of the Pyrenees mountains into Spain with a local guide (usually paid). Once in Spain the airmen were assisted by British diplomats to travel to Gibraltar and then were flown back to the United Kingdom. An alternate route was to travel from the coast of Brittany to England via small boat.

Late in the war, especially after the Normandy Invasion on June 6, 1944, the escape lines turned more to sheltering airmen in place or in forest camps to await the arrival of the allied armies rather than helping the airmen to escape occupied Europe. Operation Marathon describes the forest camps.

About 2,000 soldiers, mostly British, and 2,000 British and 3,000 American airmen who had been shot down or crash landed in western Europe evaded German capture or escaped from German imprisonment during the war. Most of the soldiers were helped to evade capture because they were left behind in France after the Dunkirk evacuation of British forces in 1940. Most of the airmen were helped from 1942 to 1944 as the air war over Europe intensified. They were assisted by many different escape lines, some of them large and organized, others informal and ephemeral. The Royal Air Forces Escaping Society estimated that 14,000 volunteers worked with the many escape and evasion lines during the war. Many others helped on an occasional basis, and the total number of people who, on one or more occasions helped downed airmen during the war, may have reached 100,000. One-half of the volunteer helpers were women, often young women, even teenagers. Several of the most important escape lines were headed by women.

The work of escape line helpers was dangerous. Given the large numbers of helpers scattered over large areas, escape lines were relatively easy for the Germans to infiltrate. Thousands of helpers were arrested and more than five hundred died in concentration camps or were executed. The attrition of escape line leaders due to German arrest was much higher. In March 1943, only one person, 61-year old Marie-Louise Dissard, remained free to re-invent the Pat O'Leary Line. In March 1944, only three of a dozen leaders of the Comet Line, the largest and most famous of the lines, were still alive and not in prison.

Initially, escape lines were self-financed by individuals in occupied countries. However, two UK clandestine organizations, mostly MI9 but also Section DF of the Special Operations Executive (SOE), financed the large escape lines. The U.S. clandestine organization MIS-X helped prisoners of war (POWs) escape from German POW camps.

The members of the escape and evasion lines were usually unarmed and did not participate in violent resistance to the German occupation. The motto of the Comet Line was Pugna Quin Percutias, 'fight without arms'. To maintain tight security, escape lines usually avoided contacts with armed resistance groups.

== Escapees and evaders ==
Organized escape and evasion lines operated in France, Belgium, the Netherlands, and Denmark. The number of airmen evading capture after being shot down or crash landing in western Europe was a small fraction of those killed or taken prisoner. For example, about 22,000 British and American airmen were killed or captured when being downed in France, but only 3,000 are recorded as having evaded capture by the Germans. Moreover, the percentage of airmen who evaded capture in France was higher than in other countries due to the proximity of the Spanish border to France and the short ocean passage to England. Nearly all the airmen downed in Germany were killed or captured, although a few escaped from prisoner of war camps and were helped to avoid re-capture by escape lines. Lesser-known escape lines operated in eastern Europe mainly to help Polish or Czech soldiers reach the Allies via the Baltic or Italy or to help Jews escape via the Balkans.

== Escape lines ==
In addition to the escape lines listed below, many others were ephemeral or family-run affairs which have escaped the notice of history. One of the small lines which has received some attention is the Balfe Line near Amiens which consisted of a husband, wife, and two teenage sons who hid escaping airmen in a shed in a World War I cemetery with the cooperation of cemetery employees. Many other small escape lines of a similar nature existed.

During the Second World War citizens in the occupied countries of Europe were not free to move about without identification cards and travel permits. Nazi patrols stopped, and searched citizens without warning or reason. Controls on travel and the frequent patrols made it extremely dangerous to move allied evaders from place to place because there was always a possibility that they would be stopped. If arrested, an evader was interrogated, sometimes tortured and sent to a POW camp. The guide/helper, however, was interrogated, often tortured, imprisoned in a concentration camp, or executed and her or his family and friends were at great risk.

My name is Andrée... but I would like you to call me by my code name, which is Dédée, which means little mother. From here on I will be your little mother, and you will be my little children. It will be my job to get my children to Spain and freedom.

— Comet Line leader, Andrée de Jongh, 24 years old, to downed airmen

Our lives are going to depend on a schoolgirl.

— A downed airman, referring to Andrée de Jongh

If an evader found himself in touch with an escape line he must obey every order from it, as promptly and as officially as he had obeyed orders from his previous commanding officer.

— M.R.D. Foot
- Belgian National Movement
- Bordeaux-Loupiac Escape Network
- Bourgogne (Burgundy) Line
- Chauny Line
- Comet Line
- Denmark Escape Line
- Dutch-Paris Line
- Groupe Hoornaert-Dirix
- Hornoy-le-Bourg Line
- Francois Line
- Françoise Line
- Marie Claire Line
- Marie-Odile Line
- Oaktree Line
- Operation Marathon
- Operation Pegasus
- Operation Sherwood
- Pat O'Leary Line (Pat Line, O'Leary Line, PAO Line)
- Ponzán group
- Possum Line (possum = I can in Latin)
- Service Eva
- Smit-Van der Heijden Line
- Shelburne Line
- VAR line
- Vic Line

== Notable people ==
- Kattalin Aguirre, Basque, Comet Line
- Robert and Germaine Ayle, French, Comet Line
- Elisabeth Barbier, French, Comet, Oaktree Line
- Andrée Borrel, French, Pat Line, SOE agent
- Vladamir Bouryschkine, American, Oaktree Line
- Anthony Brooks, British, Pat Line, SOE agent
- Georges Broussinne, French, Bourgogne Line
- Jean-Claude Camors, French, Bordeaux-Loupiac Line
- Donald Caskie, British, Pat Line
- Pat Cheramy, British, Pat Line
- Harold Cole, British, Pat Line, German agent
- Michael Creswell, British diplomat in Spain
- Virginia d'Albert-Lake, American, Comet Line, Marathon
- Madeleine Damerment, French, Pat Line, SOE agent
- Donald Darling, British, MI6 and MI9 agent
- Monique de Bissy, Belgian, Comet Line
- Elvire de Greef, Belgian, Comet Line.
- Fernand de Greef, Belgian, Comet Line
- Frederick de Greef, Belgian, Comet Line
- Janine de Greef, Belgian, Comet Line
- Andrée de Jongh, Belgian, Comet Line
- Frédéric de Jongh, Belgian, Comet Line
- Erwin Deman, French, VAR Line
- Arnold Deppé, Belgian, Comet Line
- Jacques Desoubrie, Belgian, German agent
- Prosper Dezitter, Belgian, German agent
- Marie-Louise Dissard, French, Pat, Francoise Lines
- Bruce Dowding, Australian, Pat Line
- Lucien Dumais, Canadian, Shelburne Line
- Andrée Dumon, Belgian, Comet Line
- Michelle Dumon, Belgian, Comet Line
- Antoine d'Ursel, Belgian, Comet Line
- Ian Garrow, Scottish, Pat Line
- Victor Gerson, British, Vic Line, SOE agent
- Florentino Goikoetxea, Basque, Comet Line
- Baron Jean Greindl, Belgian, Comet Line
- Albert Guérisse, Belgian, Pat line
- Nubar Gulbenkian, Armenian, Pat Line
- Elisabeth Haden-Guest, German, Pat Line
- Virginia Hall, American, Pat Line, SOE/OSS agent
- Suzanne Hiltermann-Souloumiac, Dutch, Dutch-Paris Line
- Paul Hoornaert, Belgian, Groupe Hoornaert-Dirix
- Sumner Jackson, American, American Hospital of Paris
- Catherine Janot, French, Comet Line
- Albert Edward "B" Johnson, British, Comet Line
- Herman Laatsman, Dutch, Dutch-Paris Line
- James Langley, British, MI9
- Jacques Legrelle, Belgian, Comet Line
- Roger Le Neveu, French, German agent
- Mary Lindell, British, Marie-Clair Line
- Elsie Maréchal, British, Comet Line
- Elvire Morelle, French, Comet Line
- Airey Neave, British, MI9
- Jean-François Nothomb, Belgian, Comet Line
- Louis and Andrée Nouveau, French, Pat Line
- Andrée Peel, French, VAR Line
- Francisco Ponzán Vidal, Spanish, Pat Line, Ponzán Group
- Edgard Potier, Belgian, Possum Line
- George Rodocanachi, British, Pat Line
- Josep Rovira i Canals, Catalan, Vic Line, Martín Group
- Amanda Stassart, Belgian, Comet Line
- Trix Terwindt, Dutch, MI9
- Francoise Usandizaga, Basque, Comet Line
- Peggy van Lier, Belgian, Comet Line
- Willem Visser 't Hooft, Dutch, Dutch-Paris Line
- Nancy Wake, Australian, Pat Line, SOE agent
- Gabrielle Weidner, Dutch, Dutch-Paris Line
- Johan Hendrik Weidner, Dutch, Dutch-Paris Line
- Suzanne Warenghem, French, Pat Line
- Suzanne Wittek, Belgian, Comet Line
- Edmond "Moen" Chait, Belgian, Dutch-Paris Line
