= Shelburne Escape Line =

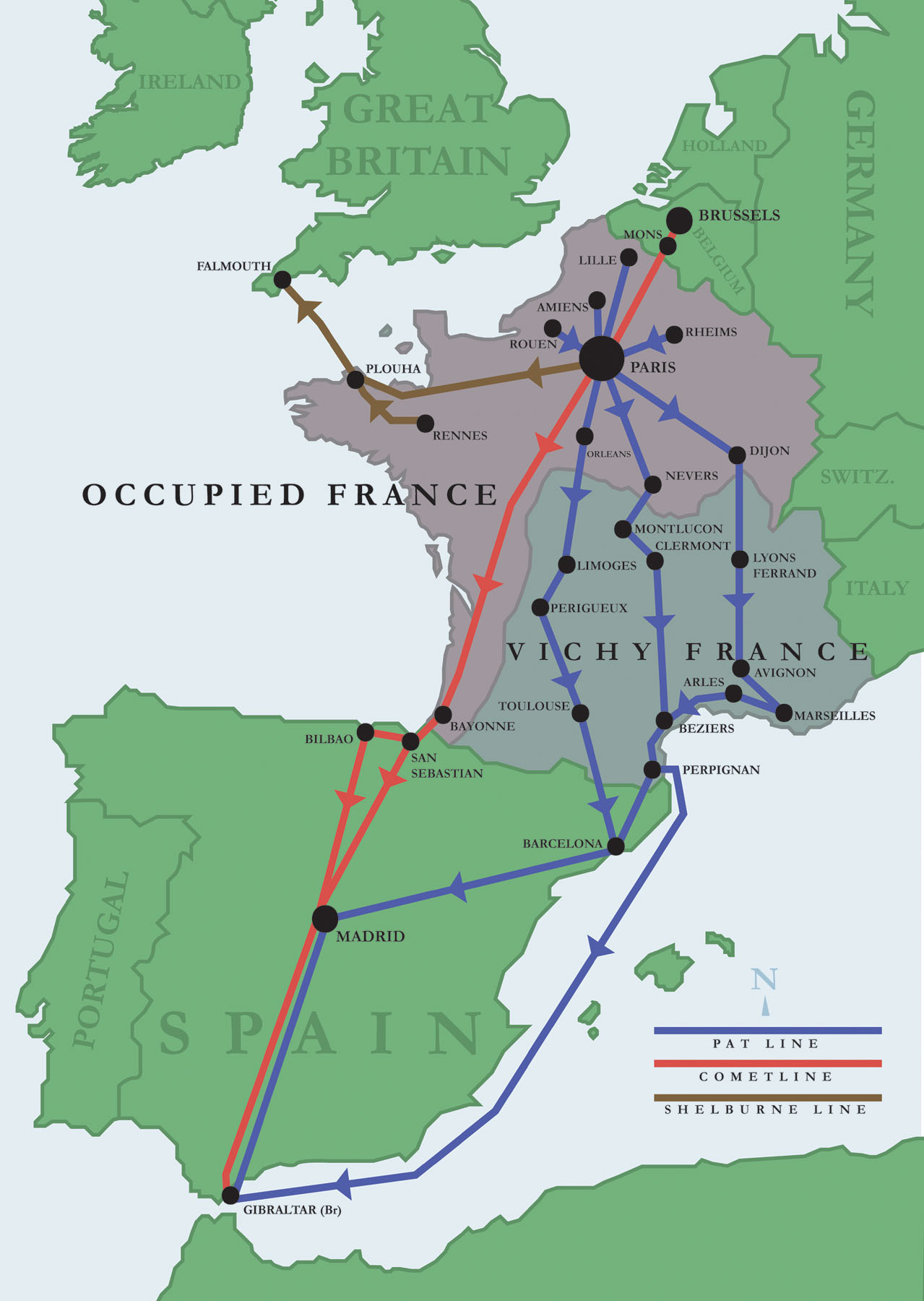
The routes used by escape lines to help downed airmen escape Nazi-occupied Europe.

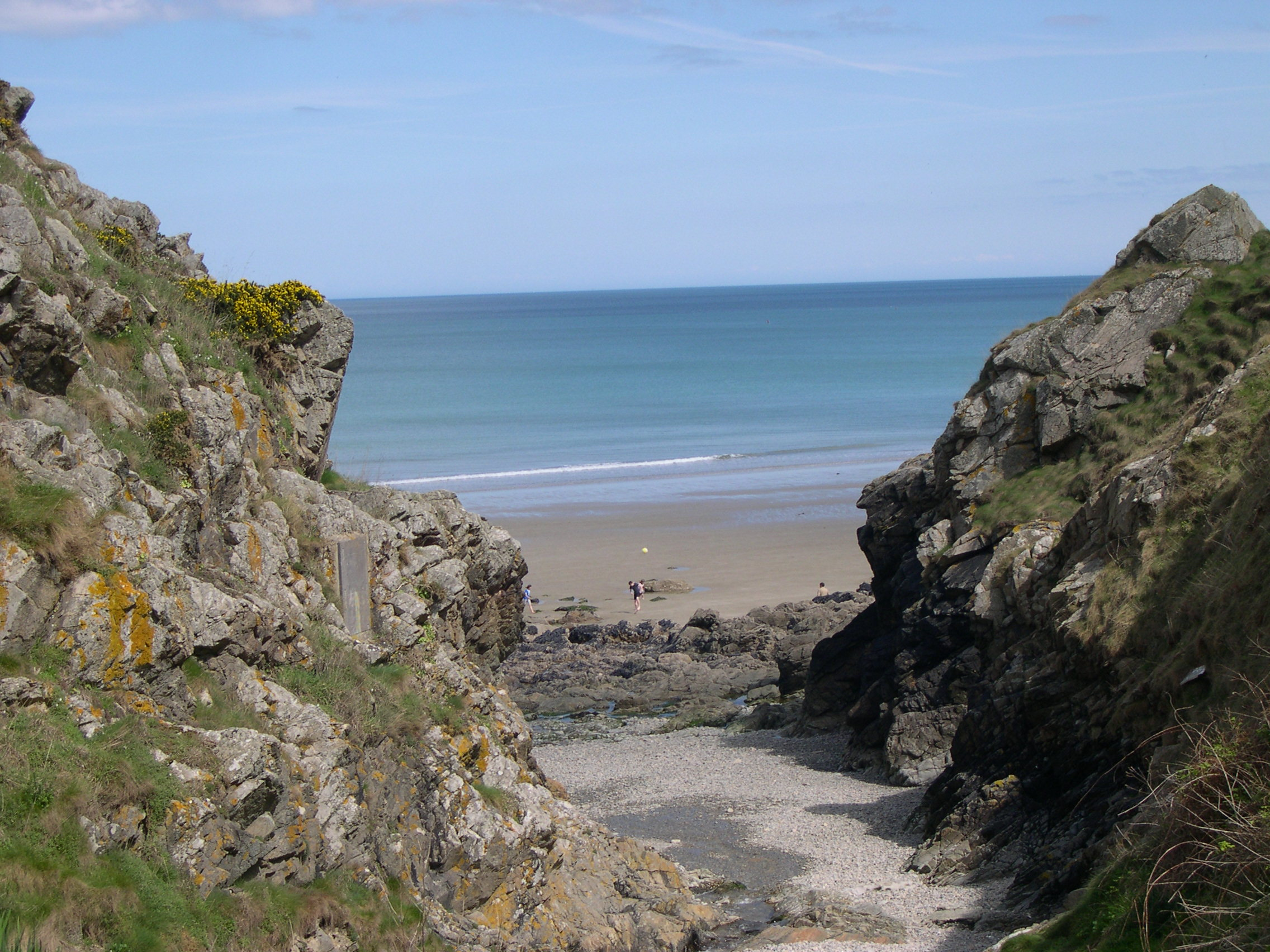
Airmen were evacuated from Bonaparte Beach near the town of Plouha.

The Shelburne Escape Line (1944) was a resistance organisation in occupied France in the Second World War. The Shelburne Line, financed by the British intelligence agency MI9, helped Allied airmen shot down over France evade capture by the occupying Germans and return to Great Britain by boat from the coast of Brittany. For the Allies, the rescue of downed airmen had a practical as well as a humanitarian objective. Training new and replacement air crews was expensive and time-consuming. Rescuing downed aircrew and returning them to duty became a priority.

MI9's first attempt, called the Oaktree Line, to set up an escape line for aircrew by boat from Brittany to England failed due to German infiltration and poor leadership. Its successor, the Shelburne Escape Line, helped more than 300 airmen evade German capture. In addition to those aircrew evacuated to England, the associated Francois Line in Paris helped aircrew escape to neutral Spain or shelter in place in a forest refuge in France.

== Background ==
Tens of thousands of allied aircrew were shot down over Nazi-occupied Europe during World War II. The majority of them were killed or captured by the Germans, but more than 5,000 in Western Europe were helped by escape lines to evade capture and return to Great Britain. The largest of many escape lines were the Pat O'Leary Line, founded in Marseille by people of several nationalities, and the Comet Line founded by Belgians. However, by spring 1943 those two lines had been weakened by German infiltrators and the capture of many of their leaders and "helpers", as the volunteers who worked for the lines were called. At the same time the air war over Europe was expanding and an increasing number of downed aircrew needed the help of escape lines to evade capture. The Shelburne Line was created and financed by MI9. Most other lines, although they may have been assisted financially by MI9 and other allied organisations, were the product of the efforts of private citizens of France, Belgium, the Netherlands, and other countries that resisted the German occupation.

== The Oaktree Line ==
The predecessor of the Shelburne Line was the Oaktree line, created by Airey Neave and James Langley of MI9 as an escape line to evacuate downed airmen by boat from Brittany in France to Dartmouth in England. The leader they chose for Oaktree was Vladamir Bouryschkine, a Russian-American better known as Val Williams, who had previously worked with the Pat Line. Canadian Raymond Labrosse went with Bouryschkine to France as the wireless operator. The pair were parachuted "blind" (not met on arrival) into France on 20 March 1943. Their radio was damaged in the jump and they were unable to communicate with MI9 in London. The pair had been warned not to contact survivors of the Pat Line which had been infiltrated and destroyed by the Germans, a warning Bouryschkine ignored. Bouryschkine went to Paris and set up an organization there to house and care for downed airmen in safehouses and then journeyed to Brittany where 90 downed airmen were awaiting evacuation. Thirty-nine of them were staying in the chateau of an American woman, Countess Roberta "Betty" de Mauduit.

Attempts to organise a sea evacuation failed because Oaktree still lacked a radio. Bouryschkine instead led a group of airmen southwards intending to link up with the Francoise Line of Marie-Louise Dissard and cross the Pyrenees on foot to Spain. Bouryschkine (notoriously careless about security) and his party were captured by the Germans on 4 June 1943 in Pau. Labrosse made it back safely to England. Oaktree collapsed and many helpers in Paris and elsewhere, including Mauduit, were captured. Bouryschkine and Mauduit both survived imprisonment. The Oaktree Line was penetrated and betrayed by Gestapo agent Roger Le Neveu.

== Shelburne Operations ==
On his return to England, Labrosse persuaded MI9 that an escape line from Brittany was still feasible. MI9 designated Canadian Lucien Dumais to head the reconstituted Oaktree with a new name "Shelburne". Dumais proved to be an efficient leader. On 19 November 1943, Dumais and Labrosse landed in France at a clandestine airfield, and this time Labrosse arrived with a functioning radio for communication with MI9. The plan they devised with Paul Campinchi and other French helpers was to hide downed aircrew in Paris where they received forged identity cards, clothing, training, and special passes for the forbidden coastal zones in Brittany. The men were hidden in safe houses, attics, barns, and abandoned buildings. During the moonless part of the month, the airmen were transported by railway to the town of Plouha near the ocean in Brittany. There they waited in a safe house for a coded message informing them that they would be picked up next night on Bonaparte Beach and taken to Plymouth, England by a Royal Navy motor gunboat.

The planned evacuations were risky. The Germans offered substantial rewards to people who betrayed downed aircrew and more than 20 residents of Plouha or nearby helped in the evacuation. A butcher, Francois Le Cornec, headed the local resistance organisation. The Brittany coast was fortified by the Germans. Bonaparte Beach was lined with steep cliffs. A German artillery blockhouse was 1,200 metres (1,300 yd) north of the beach. The motor gunboat had to anchor for several hours offshore while sailors rowed small boats to the beach to collect the airmen. Despite the risks, the Sheburne Line successfully mounted five evacuations of 118 aircrew, plus a few civilians, from Bonaparte Beach between January and March 1944. The sea evacuations were suspended after March; the Shelburne personnel were told the suspension was due to "shortening nights" but actually it was because the allies worried that continuing evacuations might interfere with plans for the Normandy Invasion of 6 June 1944. Moreover, the Germans had begun mining the beaches in Brittany and fortifying defenses in anticipation of the allied invasion, which made the continuation of Shelbourne impractical. French helpers of Shelbourne found 17 land mines on Bonaparte Beach and marked their location in anticipation of using the beach again for evacuations.

Among the evacuees was Oaktree leader Vladamir Bouryschkine who had escaped from the Germans and was (as usual) talking carelessly. At one point before the evacuation, Dumais pointed a pistol at Bouryschkine and told him he would kill him if he opened his mouth again.

=== After D-Day ===
Three additional evacuations, called Crozier I, II, and III, were carried out from Bonaparte Beach in July and August 1944, evacuating 27 additional people to England. In August the capture of Brittany by allied forces was complete and Shelbourne concluded its last operation on 9 August. After D-Day, the number of airmen evacuated by boat was 115 members of the US Air Force and 21 of the Royal Air Force. A few civilians were also evacuated, bringing the total number of evacuees by boat to 145. Unique in the dangerous work of escape organisations, and contrary to the earlier MI9 experience with the Oaktree Line, not a single member of the Shelbourne Escape Line was captured or killed in the course of its operations.

The Paris branch of Operation Shelburne, the "Francois Line" headed by Paul Campanchi – not the same as the "Francoise Line" headed by Marie-Louise Dissard – also helped evaders flee occupied France to neutral Spain and, starting in May 1944, sent evading aircrew to the "Sherwood Forest" camp near Fréteval established by Operation Marathon as an alternative to land and sea evacuations. Airmen sent to Sherwood Forest were liberated by a small force led by Airey Neave on 14 August after the Germans had retreated from the area near the forest.

The total number of airmen who were helped by the Shelburne Escape Line to evade German capture is estimated at 307. Wireless operator Raymond Labrosse attributed the success of Shelburne to the experience gained from the often tragic experiences of the pioneering Pat and Comet Lines. At a reunion of the evaders in 1964, the courage of the French helpers of Shelburne was extolled: "Theirs were calculated feats of audacious, rash fearlessness – carried out under the very eyes of the German occupational forces."

== See also ==
Escape and evasion lines (World War II)
