= Harold Cole =

British WWII spy and traitor (1906–1946)

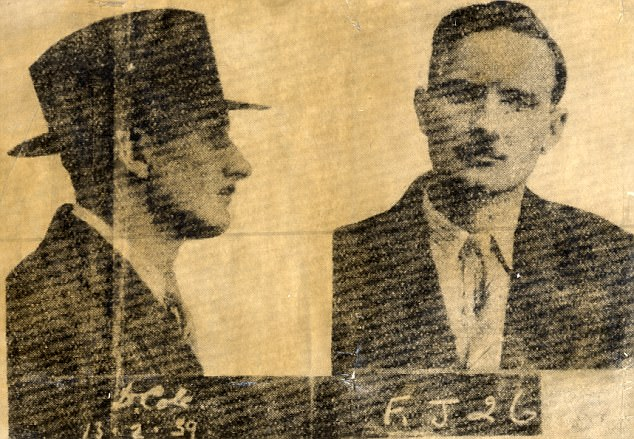
- A mugshot of Cole by the British police on 13 February 1939
- Born: 24 January 1906; London, England, United Kingdom
- Died: 8 January 1946 (aged 39); Paris, France
- Cause of death: Gunshot wounds
- Occupations: Criminal, British soldier, German agent
- Espionage activity
- Allegiance: Nazi Germany
- Service branch: Abwehr, Sicherheitsdienst
- Service years: 1941–1945
- Codename: Paul Cole

Harold Cole (24 January 1906 – 8 January 1946), also known as Harry Cole and Paul Cole (and many other aliases) was a British petty criminal, confidence man, British Army soldier, operative of the Pat O'Leary escape line, and an agent of Nazi Germany. In 1940 and 1941, he helped many British soldiers escape France after its surrender to Nazi Germany in World War II. He became a double agent for the Germans in December 1941 (or possibly earlier) and betrayed 150 escape line workers and members of the French Resistance to the Gestapo, of whom about 50 were executed or died in German concentration camps.

Cole has been described as "the worst traitor of the war." He deceived both the British and the Germans and escaped from prison on several occasions. He survived the war but was killed while resisting arrest by French police in Paris in January 1946.

== Early life ==
Cole was born in London and grew up in Hoxton, an East London slum. His parents were Albert Cole, an unskilled labourer, and Alice Ann Godfrey, formerly a servant. Albert Cole was killed in World War I and his widow married Thomas Mason, whose last name Harold Cole would sometimes use as an alias. Cole left school aged 14 and, as a teenager, he became a con man, embezzler, and petty criminal. He was in prison several times between 1923 and 1939. In 1927, he deserted from the West Kent Regiment. He claimed to have served in the British Army in Hong Kong in the 1930s, and in 1938, he was in France masquerading as "Wing Commander Wain" of the Royal Air Force. In September 1939, shortly after World War II began, Cole, recently released from prison, enlisted in the Royal Engineers of the British army.

Cole was described as "a six-footer, slim-built, and always well dressed, the type of person who can walk into clubs, attractive to gullible women." Cole fashioned himself as a suave upper-class Englishman dressed in plus fours, with plastered-down hair and a finely-clipped moustache.

== World War II ==
Serving in France and relying on his "appealing personality and sharp wits," Cole advanced rapidly to the rank of sergeant with the Royal Engineers. In March 1940, he was jailed for stealing from the non-commissioned officers' mess fund. He quickly escaped but was caught and jailed once more until his guards released him in June 1940 as the invading Germans were overrunning British forces in northern France. He remained in France when British forces were evacuated from Dunkirk. Several thousand soldiers, mostly from Britain and the Commonwealth, were left behind in France after the evacuation and were hidden by French citizens. British pilots were also being shot down over France and, if they survived, sought assistance from the French.

In the summer of 1940, Cole quickly built up a circle of contacts in Lille and La Madeleine, a suburb of Lille. He presented himself as Captain Delobel of British intelligence. He persuaded a wealthy industrialist, François Duprez, to finance his efforts to assist British soldiers and airmen to escape France and return to England. In La Madeleine, the upstairs apartment of a hair stylist, Jeannine Voglimacci, served as a meeting place for Cole, his helpers, and British soldiers seeking help. Voglimacci became a key assistant, although she considered Cole "bizarre." Cole largely achieved the objective of combining all the disparate individuals and organisations helping British soldiers in the Lille region under his leadership. Through contacts at City Hall, he obtained false identity documents for himself and his helpers and a document for himself saying that he had speech and hearing impediments. Cole spoke poor, accented French, and the document enabled him to pretend to be unable to speak and hear if necessary for deception and in the presence of Germans. Cole's followers at the time included 18-year-old Roland Hector Lepers and Lepers's girlfriend Madeleine Damerment, who would later become an agent of the clandestine British organisation, the Special Operations Executive.

=== The escape line ===
French citizens helped British soldiers and airmen flee German-occupied northern France for relatively benign southern France, called Vichy France and unoccupied by Germany until November 1942. Marseille was the usual destination. However, the Germans and Vichy French government made it more difficult for the British soldiers and their French helpers to travel southward. Cole's contacts and widespread network had the sophistication and technical capability to provide false identity cards, travel documents, clothing, guides, and travel expenses to British evaders and escapees.

Despite his influence, Cole had detractors. One of the most active women helping British evaders, Maud Olga Baudot de Rouville, said of him, "he was always borrowing money, or begging petrol, and never repaying it, and he talked ill of people behind their backs...he had women everywhere and was always going on sprees with them." She eventually broke off contact with Cole.

In January 1941, Roland Lepers led a group of eight British soldiers and airmen south to Marseille, where he came into contact with Ian Garrow, the leader of the clandestine Pat O'Leary escape line (Pat Line) which was dedicated to transporting British soldiers stranded in France to neutral Spain from where they could be returned to Britain. Garrow was impressed. He gave Lepers FRF10,000 (about $3,700 in 2020 US dollars) for expenses, and when Cole visited Marseille in February, Garrow named him the head of the Pat line in northern France and gave him another FRF10,000 for expenses. In the following months, Cole and Lepers transported a group of five to ten English soldiers and airmen south to Marseille every two weeks, for which Cole received reimbursement for the expenses he claimed from Garrow. Abbé Pierre Carpentier, a French chaplain, organised the difficult and illegal border crossing between occupied France and Vichy France. Cole began to spend most of his time in Marseille.

Cole was known to Scotland Yard and MI9, the secret British organisation which financed the Pat and other escape lines. He was described as a con man with a string of convictions for housebreaking and fraud, but his background was disregarded because of his efficiency in helping British soldiers. However, Garrow and the Pat Line leaders slowly learned that Cole was keeping the expense money paid him in his pocket rather than distributing it to his helpers. Albert Guérisse, a Belgian who became the leader of the Pat Line after the Vichy French arrested Ian Garrow in October 1941, arranged a meeting on 1 November 1941 with Cole and himself and several leading members of the Pat Line in the Marseille apartment of Dr. George Rodocanachi. They arrested Cole and confronted him with the evidence of his fraud and double-dealing. They locked him in a bathroom while they debated his fate, with some favouring execution. The fear was that Cole, if allowed to live, might betray the Pat Line and its members. Cole forced open a window and escaped.

After Cole's escape, Guérisse and an Australian agent, Bruce Dowding, rushed north to warn Cole's associates that he might betray them, but many refused to believe the two men, who were unknown in Lille.

=== German agent ===
Now on the run from the Pat Line in Marseille, but not yet discredited to most of his associates in the Lille area, Cole took refuge in a house in La Madeleine, and there on 6 December 1941 he was arrested by the Geheime Feldpolizei, an executive branch of the Abwehr (German military intelligence). Author Murphy speculates that the raid may have been a sham and that Cole had been a German agent before his arrest. Whatever the truth, Cole quickly complied with the German demand for information about the Pat Line. He wrote a 30-page statement for the Germans, identifying dozens of his associates and describing the operations of the northern section of the Pat Line. Arrests of Cole's former associates began that same day. François Duprez was one of the first arrested; Abbé Pierre Carpentier was arrested on 8 December. Duprez later died in a German concentration camp, and Carpentier was executed. Cole accompanied the Germans on some arrests. Cole, however, withheld some names and information from the Germans. He did not betray Jeannine Voglimacci, the hairdresser in La Madeleine, but wrote her a letter threatening retribution if she continued to work for the Pat Line. After the destruction of the Pat Line in Lille, SOE agent Michael Trotobas re-created an escape line based in Abbeville.

Cole took refuge in Paris and Lyon after he betrayed the Pat Line, escaping German control and now a fugitive from both the Germans and the outraged survivors of the Pat Line. On 9 June 1942, he was arrested by the Vichy police in Lyon and charged with espionage. Vichy was under the thumb of the Germans but maintained some of its independence by prosecuting German and Allied secret agents, and Cole qualified as both. On 21 July, Cole was convicted and sentenced to death. The sentence was later changed to life imprisonment, and Cole remained imprisoned until the end of 1943. The Germans did not trust Cole enough to order his release from prison, although he may have done some work for them while a prisoner.

=== Suzanne Warenghem ===
In the summer of 1941, Cole became romantically involved with Suzanne Warenghem, one-half English, 19 years old, living in Paris, and a successful guide for the Pat Line. Despite warnings of Cole's double-dealing, she became his chief assistant and lover, apparently believing he was a British agent. Cole and Warenghem were married on 10 April 1942 in Paris. She was arrested along with Cole on 9 June 1942, but in the subsequent trial, she was judged innocent of espionage. During the trial, she finally realised that Cole was a traitor to Britain and France. "She was naive, because she was a real patriot," a British agent said. Alone, penniless, and pregnant, she found her way to Marseille, where the Pat Line helped her, although she was under suspicion because of her association with Cole. She gave birth on 31 October 1942, but the child died on 12 January 1943.

In March 1943, Warenghem was re-arrested on the charge of helping a British agent escape prison. She was sent to Castres prison. On 16 September 1943, she escaped along with Special Operations Executive (SOE) agent Blanche Charlet. Charlet and Warenghem reached open country and, helped by a local farmer, took refuge in a Benedictine monastery. There, they sheltered in a guest house for two months before the monks took them to an escape line that helped people flee France by walking across the Pyrénées mountains to Spain. Heavy snow prevented them from crossing the mountains.

Having failed to cross into Spain, Charlet and Warenghem, now in touch with SOE headquarters in London, undertook a cross-country saga. First, they journeyed to Paris and then to Lyon. Warenghem heard from friends that Cole was inquiring about her. Frightened, she took the false identity of Aline Le Gale and slept with a pistol under her pillow. From Lyon, Warenghem and Charlet travelled to the Jura Mountains near the border of Switzerland. In April 1944, SOE arranged for Charlet and Warenghem to escape France. To do so, they crossed France again to Brittany, where they were picked up on a beach by a small boat and rowed offshore to a motor torpedo boat, a dangerous operation as the Germans were fortifying the French coast in anticipation of an Allied invasion. They were fired on during their escape, but their boat outpaced German pursuers and arrived safely in Plymouth on 20 April 1944. Warenghem, who changed her name to Suzanne Warren, never saw Cole again.

== On the run and death ==
In the winter of 1943/1944, Cole was released from prison and went to work for Hans Kieffer, the efficient head of the Sicherheitsdienst (SD), the SS intelligence agency in Paris. With France invaded and the Allied armies advancing, Cole, Kieffer, and other SD operatives fled Paris on 17 August 1944. Cole wore the uniform of a German military officer. Kieffer and Cole retreated as the Allies advanced, and in April 1945, in the Black Forest, they shed their uniforms and burned everything that might have identified them as German soldiers. Cole refashioned himself as Captain Robert Mason, a British secret agent whom the SD had captured. Kieffer played the part of a low-level German policeman. They surrendered to the American 117th Cavalry Reconnaissance Squadron near Wald, Germany. Kieffer was released after questioning, and Cole was given the uniform of a U.S. Army lieutenant and an identification card as a member of Allied intelligence.

Fearing discovery, Cole soon deserted the American army and fled to the sector of a defeated Germany, then occupied by France. Wearing his American uniform, he had an enthusiastic welcome there, portraying himself as an experienced intelligence operative. He was given the job of arresting and interrogating Nazis in the Bad Saulgau area. He gathered a group of thugs under his command. He accomplished the task with maximum looting and brutality, including the unauthorised execution of at least one former SS officer.

However, British intelligence was on Cole's trail, watching two of his ex-mistresses in Paris. He sent a postcard to one of them with a return address. She shared the postcard unwittingly with an MI9 officer. On 11 June 1945, Cole was found and arrested by MI5's Peter Hope after a fight in which Cole shot Hope in the leg. He was interrogated and imprisoned in Paris, but on 18 November, he stole the military overcoat of an American sergeant as a disguise and walked out of the prison. A massive search ensued. As usual, Cole sought the company of a woman to assist him, and he found one at "Billy's Bar." Acting on a tip that a man who might be a German deserter was hiding out at Billy's Bar, French police conducting a routine search for deserters converged on the bar on 8 January 1946. Cole was killed in the ensuing gunfight after slightly wounding one officer. His body was later identified by Albert Guérisse, his Pat Line colleague who had survived imprisonment by the Germans.

== Legacy ==
Airey Neave of MI9 said that Cole "was among the most selfish and callous traitors who ever served the enemy in time of war." MI9's leader James Langley said of Cole that he was "a con man, thief and utter shit who betrayed his country to the highest bidder for money." However, some historians have speculated that Cole was an agent of Britain's Secret Intelligence Service (MI6). The evidence cited is that MI6's deputy leader Claude Dansey, who also influenced MI9, opposed the execution of Cole when the Pat Line first proposed it. The unconfirmed claims are that Dansey placed a higher priority on preserving the intelligence gathering operations of MI6 than the escape lines and tolerated Cole's misdeeds to protect him as an MI6 agent.

Some soldiers whom Cole helped evade German capture defended him. Before defecting to the Germans, Cole was an effective escape line leader, albeit accused of the personal use of funds given him by the Pat Line for expenses. Keith Janes, author of Conscript Heroes whose father was a British soldier stranded in France, said, "I will never fully understand how, why or when Paul [sic] Cole defected to the enemy, but in so far as concerned my father and other evaders, he served them well."
