= Ian Garrow =

British Army officer

Captain Ian Grant Garrow
- Born: 24 August 1908; South Africa
- Died: 28 March 1976 (aged 67)
- Military career
- Allegiance: United Kingdom
- Branch: British Army
- Service years: 1930-1958
- Rank: Lieutenant-Colonel
- Unit: Highland Light Infantry
- Conflicts: World War II
- Awards: Distinguished Service Order

Ian Grant Garrow DSO (24 August 1908 - 28 March 1976) was a British army officer with the Seaforth Highlanders of the Highland Light Infantry. During World War II, he was stranded in France when the British army withdrew in the Dunkirk evacuation in June 1940. He made his way on foot to Marseille. Rather than attempting to continue on to neutral Spain, he stayed in Marseille and founded what became known as the Pat O'Leary Line which was dedicated to helping Allied soldiers and airmen escape Nazi-occupied France.

Garrow was arrested by the Vichy French police in October 1941 and imprisoned. With help from the Pat Line he escaped in December 1942, was smuggled into Spain, and was flown back to Britain from Barcelona. He was honoured with the Distinguished Service Order (DSO) by the British government.

== Early career ==
Garrow, of Scottish ancestry, was born in South Africa in 1908. His father was a medical doctor and his mother was a nurse. The family moved to Glasgow in 1919. Garrow attended the Glasgow Academy, where he rose to the rank of cadet sergeant in the academy's officer training corps. He was commissioned a second lieutenant in the 9th Battalion of the Highland Light Infantry in the Territorial Army on 21 May 1930. He was promoted to lieutenant on 21 May 1933 and subsequently transferred to the Territorial Army Reserve of Officers, holding the rank of Lieutenant, on 9 June 1937.

M. R. D. Foot and Jimmy Langley described Garrow as "a tall dark-haired captain in the Seaforth Highlanders in his early twenties (sic), who spoke French with a noticeable Scots accent".

== Second World War ==
Following the surrender of the Highland 51st Division at Saint-Valéry-en-Caux on the Normandy coast on 12 June 1940, Garrow, then a lieutenant, managed to avoid being taken prisoner. On hearing that France had surrendered, Garrow and other British personnel tried unsuccessfully to escape to the Channel Islands. In August, after walking to Marseilles, Garrow turned himself in to the Vichy French regime and was officially interned, although able to move freely around the city.

In October 1940, Garrow began working with other British interned or living in Marseilles such as Donald Caskie and Nancy Wake and French resisters such as Louis Nouveau and George Rodocanachi, to organise the escape to Britain of Allied internees and soldiers and airmen stranded in France. Taking advantage of the limited freedom of movement initially accorded him by the Vichy government, Garrow organized the escape system, recruited dozens, and later hundreds, of volunteer workers for the escape line, and found funds for the expenses of housing, transporting, and documenting the Allied soldiers and airmen. In June 1941, Garrow and the other founders were joined by Albert Guérisse, whose nom de guerre of "Pat O'Leary" became the name of the escape and evasion line. The Pat Line helped more than 600 soldiers and airmen to escape occupied France. The Pat line also helped some civilians escape France. Most of the escapees crossed the Pyrenees into neutral Spain on foot led by guides hired by the Pat Line.

One of Garrow's co-workers was Harold Cole who escorted airmen from northern France to Marseille. Initially favourable to Cole, Garrow became aware that Cole was a double agent working for the Germans and made plans to assassinate him. Before he could carry out the assassination he was arrested by Vichy police in October 1941 and later interned at Mauzac (Dordogne). His role as head of the escape line was taken over by Guérisse.

Garrow's good friend, Nancy Wake, and Guérisse led the attempt to free Garrow from prison. They had a tailor make a guard's uniform. Wake bribed a guard to turn a blind eye and Garrow, clad in the uniform, walked out of the Mauzac prison in December 1942. He was sheltered by Marie Dissard (code name Françoise) in Toulouse, before being guided across the Pyrenees to the British Consulate in Barcelona. Garrow returned to England at the beginning of February 1943, and as a war-substantive captain, was awarded the Distinguished Service Order (DSO) on 4 May.

== Postwar ==
Garrow ended the war as a lieutenant (war-substantive major), and was promoted to the substantive rank of major on 1 January 1949. He continued in the Territorial Army, and retired on 20 September 1958 as an honorary lieutenant-colonel.
