= Plouha =

Plouha Plóha (Gallo) Plouha (Breton)
- Commune
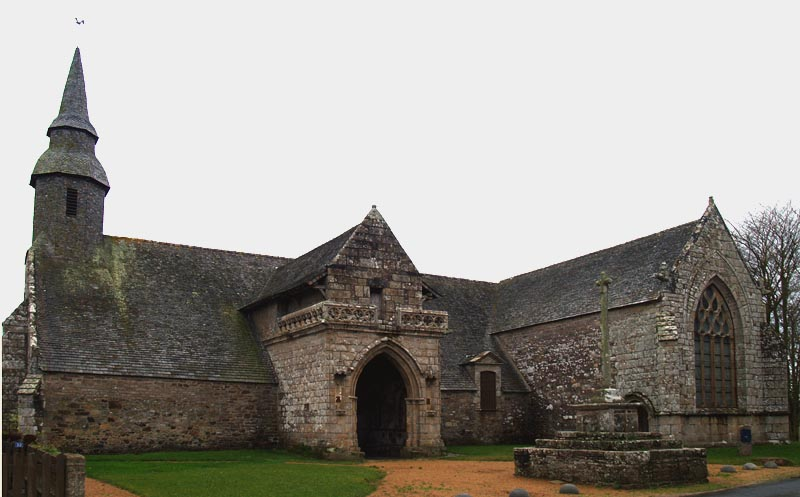
- Kermaria an'Iskuit Chapel, Kermaria

- Coat of arms
- Location of Plouha
- Location within France Location within Brittany
- Coordinates: 48°41′N 2°56′W
- Country: France
- Region: Brittany
- Department: Côtes-d'Armor
- Arrondissement: Guingamp
- Canton: Plouha

Government
  - Mayor (2021–2026): Xavier Compain
- Area^{1}: 39.97 km^{2} (15.43 sq mi)
- Highest elevation: 109 m (358 ft)
- Lowest elevation: 0 m (0 ft)
- Population (2023): 4,634
  - Density: 115.9/km^{2} (300.3/sq mi)
- Time zone: UTC+01:00 (CET)
  - Summer (DST): UTC+02:00 (CEST)
- INSEE/Postal code: 22222 /22580
- ^{1} French Land Register data, which excludes lakes, ponds, glaciers > 1 km^{2} (0.386 sq mi or 247 acres) and river estuaries.

Plouha (French pronunciation: [plu.a]; Breton: Plouha; Gallo: Plóha) is a town and commune in the Côtes-d'Armor department of Brittany in northwestern France.

== Population ==
Inhabitants of Plouha are called plouhatins in French.

Historical population
Year	Pop.	±% p.a.
1968	4,296	—
1975	4,195	−0.34%
1982	4,248	+0.18%
1990	4,197	−0.15%
1999	4,397	+0.52%
2007	4,535	+0.39%
2012	4,546	+0.05%
2017	4,503	−0.19%
2023	4,634	+0.48%
Source: INSEE

== International relations ==
=== Twin towns – sister cities ===
Plouha is twinned with:

- (Republic of Ireland) Killorglin, County Kerry, Ireland (since 1999)
- Palas de Rei, Galicia, Spain (since 2003)
- Seix, Occitania, France (since 2013)

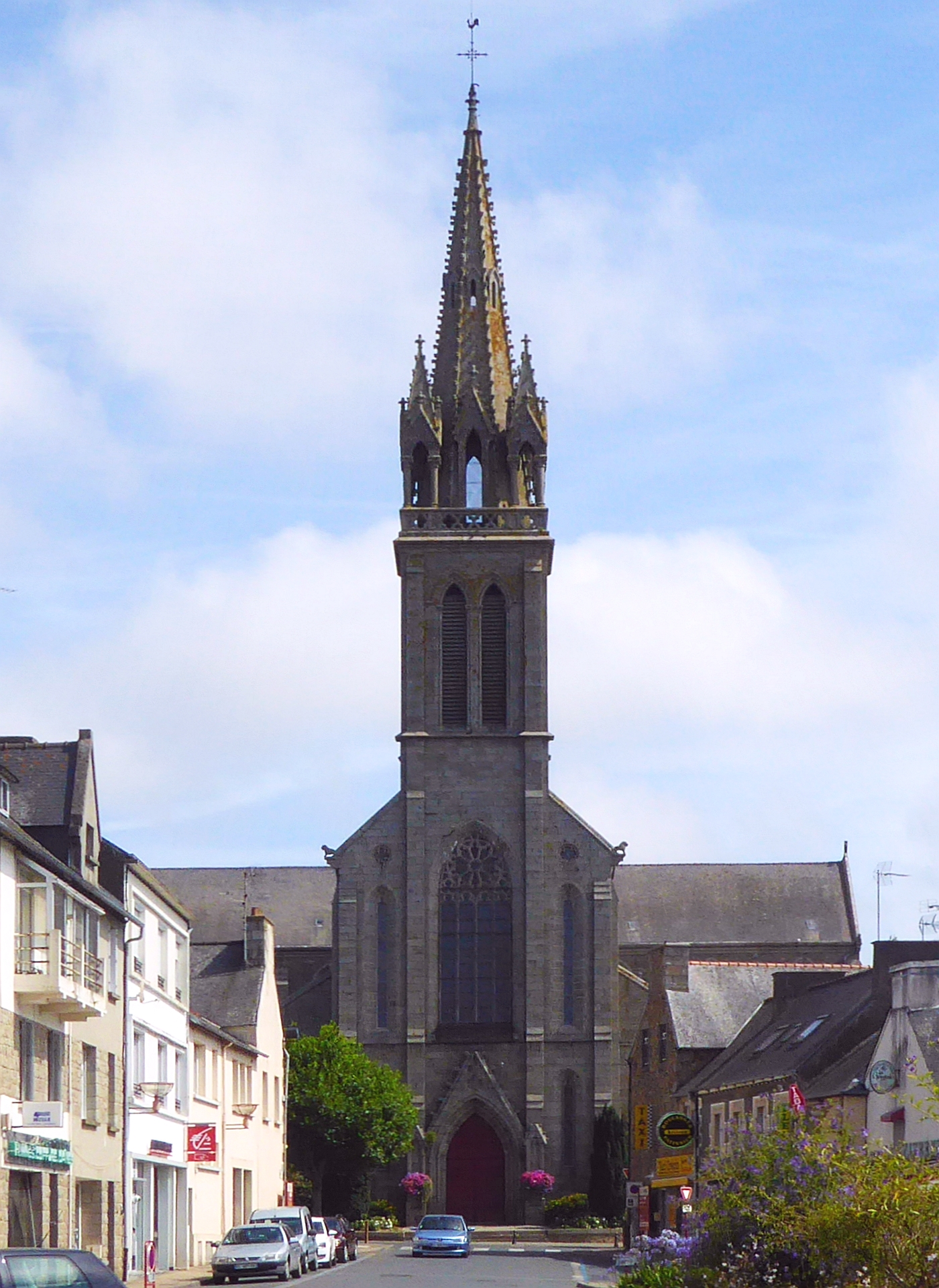
The 1872 church of St. Peter in Plouha

== History ==
Plouha has many notable medieval sites ranging from chapels and churches to manoires and kers, including The Chapel of Kermaria (Kermaria an Iskuit).

=== World War II ===
Plouha's beaches were the sight of several resistance efforts, notably as part of the Comet line, a resistance group that sheltered Allied troops and helped them return to Great Britain. The Bonaparte beach near Plouha was the site for the evacuations by sea organized by the Shelburne Escape Line and residents of Plouha. In 1944, more than 100 downed allied airmen were evacuated by Royal Navy motor gunboats from Bonaparte Beach to Dartmouth, England.

== See also ==
- Communes of the Côtes-d'Armor department
