= Fréteval =

- Commune
- Coat of arms
- Location of Fréteval
- Location within France Location within Centre-Val de Loire
- Coordinates: 47°53′19″N 1°12′38″E
- Country: France
- Region: Centre-Val de Loire
- Department: Loir-et-Cher
- Arrondissement: Vendôme
- Canton: Le Perche

Government
  - Mayor (2023–2026): Pascal Trassard
- Area^{1}: 20.49 km^{2} (7.91 sq mi)
- Elevation: 90 m (300 ft)
- Highest elevation: 151 m (495 ft)
- Lowest elevation: 85 m (279 ft)
- Population (2023): 1,063
  - Density: 51.88/km^{2} (134.4/sq mi)
- Time zone: UTC+01:00 (CET)
  - Summer (DST): UTC+02:00 (CEST)
- INSEE/Postal code: 41095 /41160
- ^{1} French Land Register data, which excludes lakes, ponds, glaciers > 1 km^{2} (0.386 sq mi or 247 acres) and river estuaries.

Fréteval (French pronunciation: [fʁetval]) is a commune in the French department of Loir-et-Cher. The village is located on the right bank of the river Loir. Archaeological evidence indicates that the site was occupied by the second century CE. In the Middle Ages, the fortifications of the Château de Fréteval were used to defend the region against Anjou and, later, England. The Battle of Fréteval was fought nearby in 1194. The Forest of Fréteval extends into the northern part of the commune and was used in World War II as a refuge for Allied airmen shot down over France.

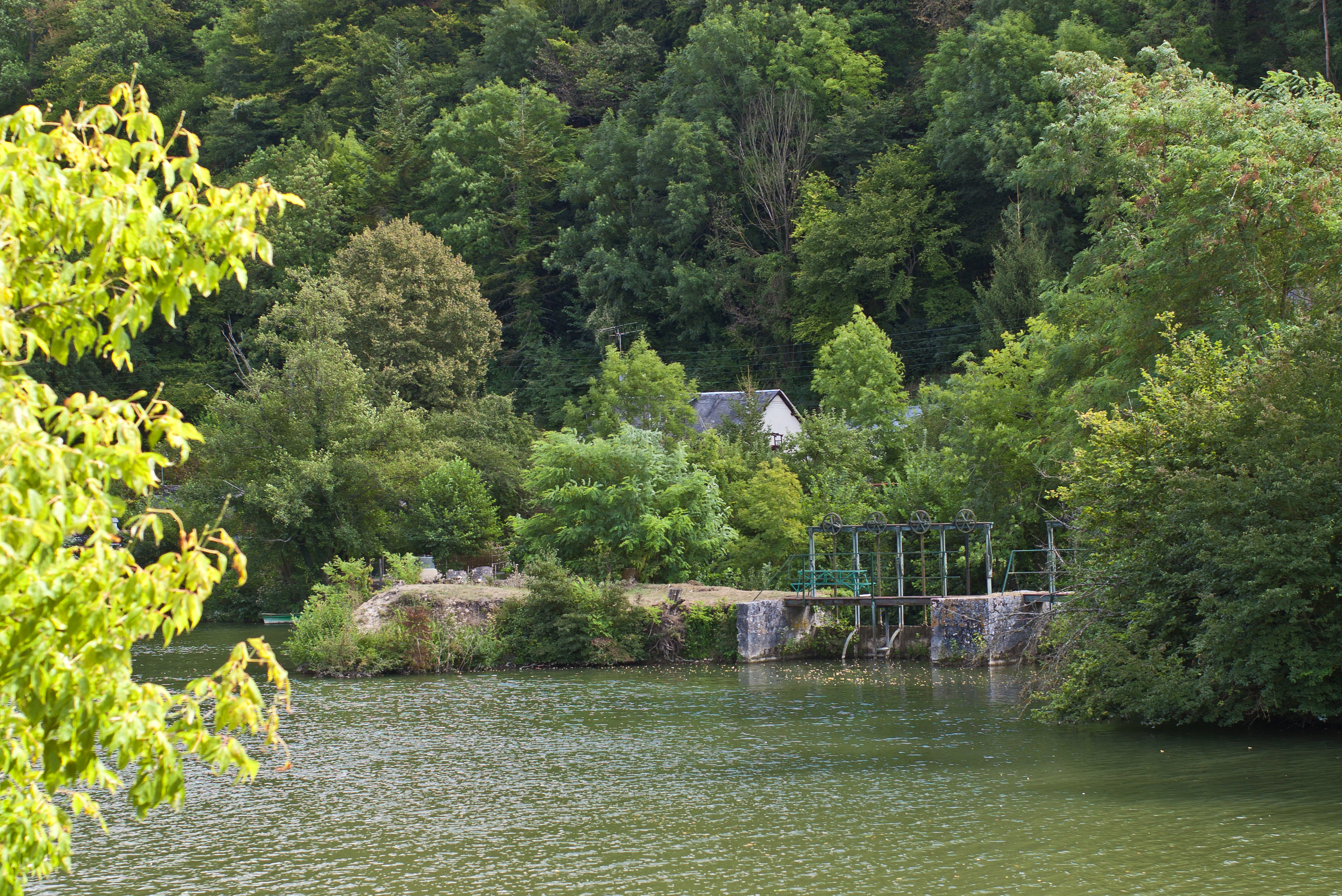
A lock on the Loir

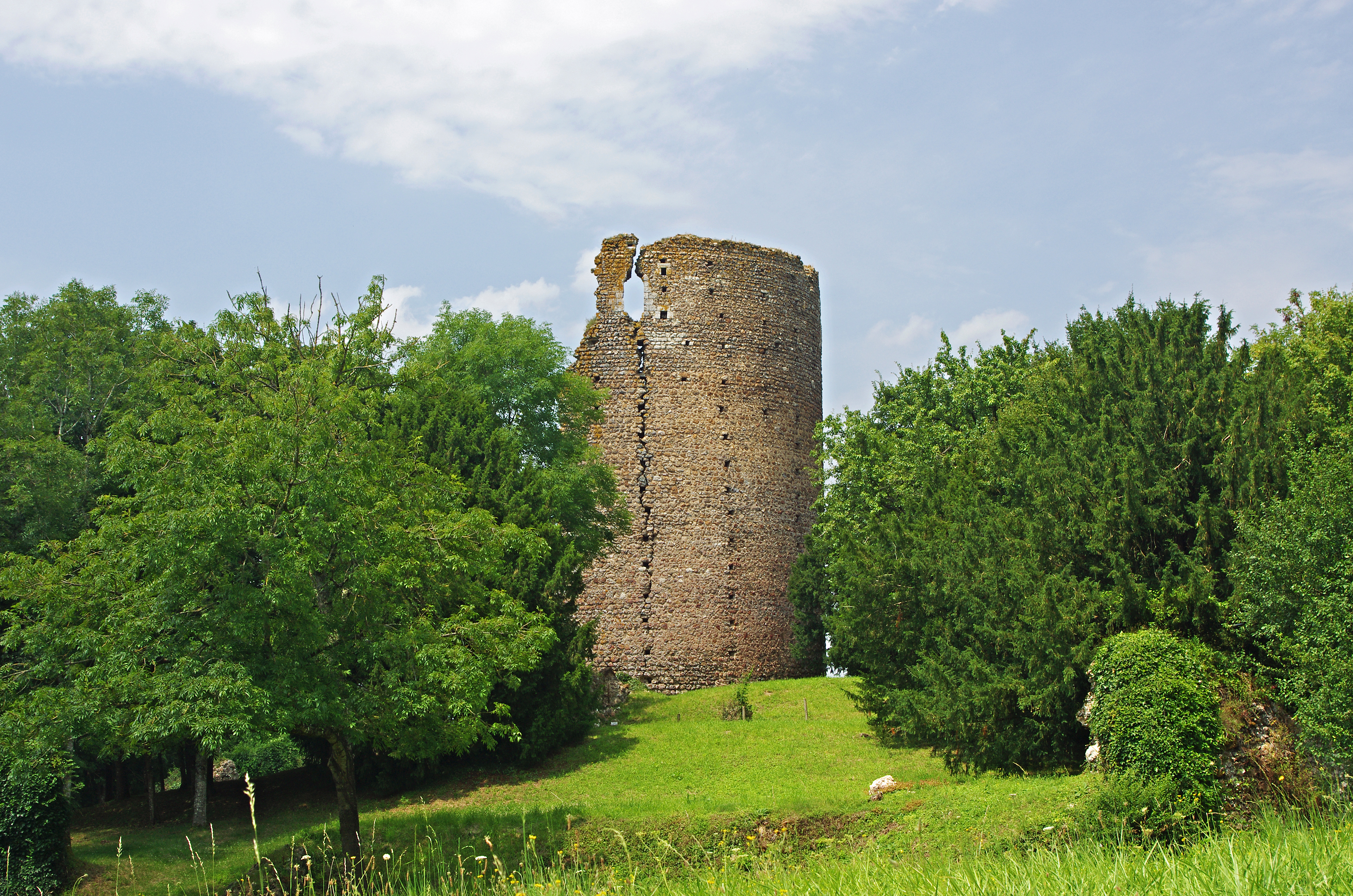
The round keep of the chateau of Fréteval

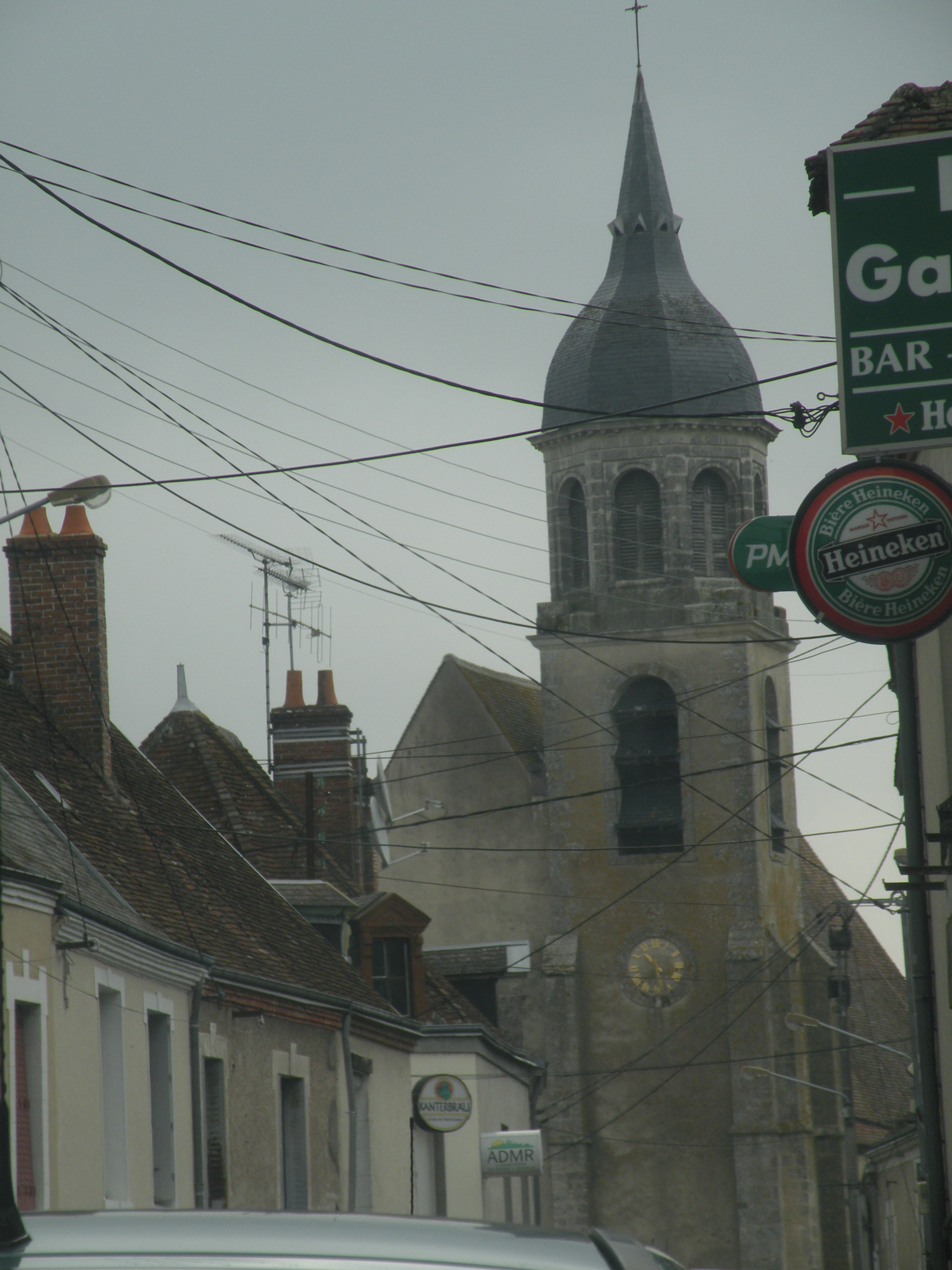
The church in the village of Fréteval

== History ==
Near the village of Fréteval is the Grisset tower, the ruins of a Roman-Gallic religious complex dating from the second century CE. Only part of the cella, the tower at the center of the complex, has survived intact. Archaeologists have found traces of baths and a theater. The site was occupied by a village called Saint Victor in the early middle ages.

The Fréteval family is first mentioned in records in the mid-10th century. Count Eudes II of Chartres built the Château de Fréteval about 1025 to defend the area from Anjou. The Frétevals were a noble family with regional power as vassals of the Counts of Blois and Counts of Chartres (often the same person) from 1000 to 1170. The château covered an area of 4.5 hectares (11 acres) with three lines of defense against attacks. A round tower, the keep or Donjon, survives. It is one of the oldest circular keeps in France.

On 3 July 1194, at the Battle of Freteval, the forces of Richard I of England raided the camp of Philippe II of France and captured the written records and much of the treasure of the French kingdom. After the battle, Philippe established the National Archives of France in Paris as a more secure and permanent depository and library for government documents. The château was damaged by English attacks in 1418 and thereafter was mostly uninhabited.

== Population ==
Historical population
| Year | Pop. | ±% p.a. |
|---|---|---|
| 1968 | 899 | — |
| 1975 | 909 | +0.16% |
| 1982 | 863 | −0.74% |
| 1990 | 848 | −0.22% |
| 1999 | 897 | +0.63% |
| 2007 | 1,032 | +1.77% |
| 2012 | 1,134 | +1.90% |
| 2017 | 1,083 | −0.92% |
| 2023 | 1,063 | −0.31% |
Source: INSEE

== Fréteval Forest ==
The Fréteval Forest, 299 square miles (770 km^{2}) of thick woodland 100 miles (160 km) south of Paris, is partially located in the commune.

In 1944 during World War II, the Fréteval Forest, code named "Sherwood" in Operation Marathon, was one of several sites used to hide Allied airmen who had been shot down by the Germans and were attempting to evade capture. They were sheltered in camps in the forest. Airmen were first collected from where they had crashed and transported to Paris and assembled in safe houses in Paris. From Paris to the camps the evaders and their French guides traveled by train to the town of Châteaudun and then hiked 10-mile (16 km) down country roads. The French Resistance was strong in the forest area, but the leaders of the resistance agreed to cease operations so as not to call German attention to the forest.

The officer in charge of the forest camps was an ex-Comet line veteran, Jean de Blommaert, who was parachuted into France and made his way to Paris to start arrangements for the camp. The first evaders were brought from Paris to the camps on 20 May 1944. On 12 June, while guiding several airmen from Paris to the camps, an American woman active in the French resistance, Virginia d'Albert-Lake, was captured and imprisoned by the Germans.

A British officer, Airey Neave, of MI9, (British Military Intelligence Section 9), supervised Operation Marathon. Neave and a small force of French Resistance fighters and allied soldiers liberated the camp on 14 August 1944. 152 Allied airmen were brought to safety.

== See also ==
- Communes of the Loir-et-Cher department
