= Operation Marathon =

WW II operation to rescue downed airmen

Coordinates: 47°53′19″N 1°12′38″E

Location of Fréteval Forest in Centre-Val de Loire

Operation Marathon in World War II helped allied airmen who had been shot down or crash-landed in Nazi-occupied Europe evade capture by the Germans. The British intelligence organization, MI9, created the operation to gather downed airmen into isolated forest camps where they would await their rescue by allied military forces advancing after the Normandy Invasion of June 6, 1944. The Comet Line, a Belgian/French escape line, operated the forest camps with financial and logistical help from MI9.

The most important of the forest camps, code named Sherwood, was in the Fréteval forest of France and sheltered 152 British and American airmen between May and August 1944. MI9 executive Airey Neave and a small Allied force liberated the airmen on August 14, 1944. Other forest camps in France and the Ardennes forest in Belgium held another 150 or more airmen who were liberated with the advance of the allied armies.

== Background ==
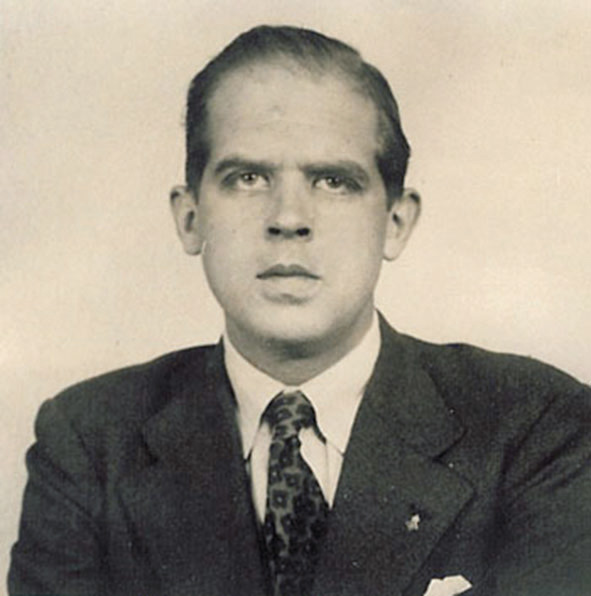
Jean de Blommaert, head of Marathon in France.

Tens of thousands of allied aircraft were shot down or crash landed in Nazi-occupied Europe during World War II. Escape and evasion lines operated by civilian volunteers in France, Belgium, Netherlands, and Denmark helped about 5,000 downed allied airmen evade capture by the Germans and escape to a neutral country such as Spain. However, in 1944, heavy allied bombing of railroads and other transportation infrastructure made escape to neutral counties increasingly difficult in the run-up to the Normandy Invasion of France.

The United Kingdom's military intelligence organization, MI9, decided, as an alternative to exfiltrations of downed airmen, to gather airmen into isolated forest camps where they could await the arrival of allied armies. MI9 official Airey Neave conceived of Operation Marathon in the fall of 1943 and began planning the operation with three Belgians: Jean de Blommaert, Georges d'Oultremont, and Albert Ancia. All of them were or had been associated with the Comet Line. They selected three locations for forest camps: the Freteval forest, 150 kilometres (93 mi) southwest of Paris, a forest near Rennes in Brittany, and the Ardennes forest in Belgium. The Freteval forest was code named Sherwood. Neave began training personnel and parachuting or landing them secretly in France to prepare for the implementation of Marathon. The three Belgians identified fields for aircraft landings and parachute drops of supplies and identified people who lived near the proposed forest camps and were willing to assist airmen.

In early 1944, the Comet Line had been decimated by arrests by German security police, but Neave nevertheless looked to it to implement the operation. To coordinate, British authorities met in Madrid, Spain in February 1944 with three surviving Comet Line leaders: Elvire de Greef (Auntie Go), Marcel Roger (Max), and Michelle Dumon (Michou or Lily), 22 years old but with a forged identity card that gave her age as 16. The Comet Line jealously guarded its independence from MI9 and cooperation required both persuasion and an infusion of cash for expenses to gain its participation in the operation.

Operation Marathon almost got off to a disastrous start. A man who called himself Pierre Boulain had been helpful to de Blommaert and Ancia. They scheduled a meeting with him on May 7 in Paris with the plan of giving him 500,000 francs (about 2,500 British pounds in 1944 currency) to help in the operation. However, Michelle Dumon learned that "Boulain" was actually a German agent whose real name was Jacques Desoubrie. She alerted de Blommaert and Ancia, exposed Desoubrie as a German agent, and all three avoided capture by the Germans, although Dumon had to flee to England.

== Sherwood ==
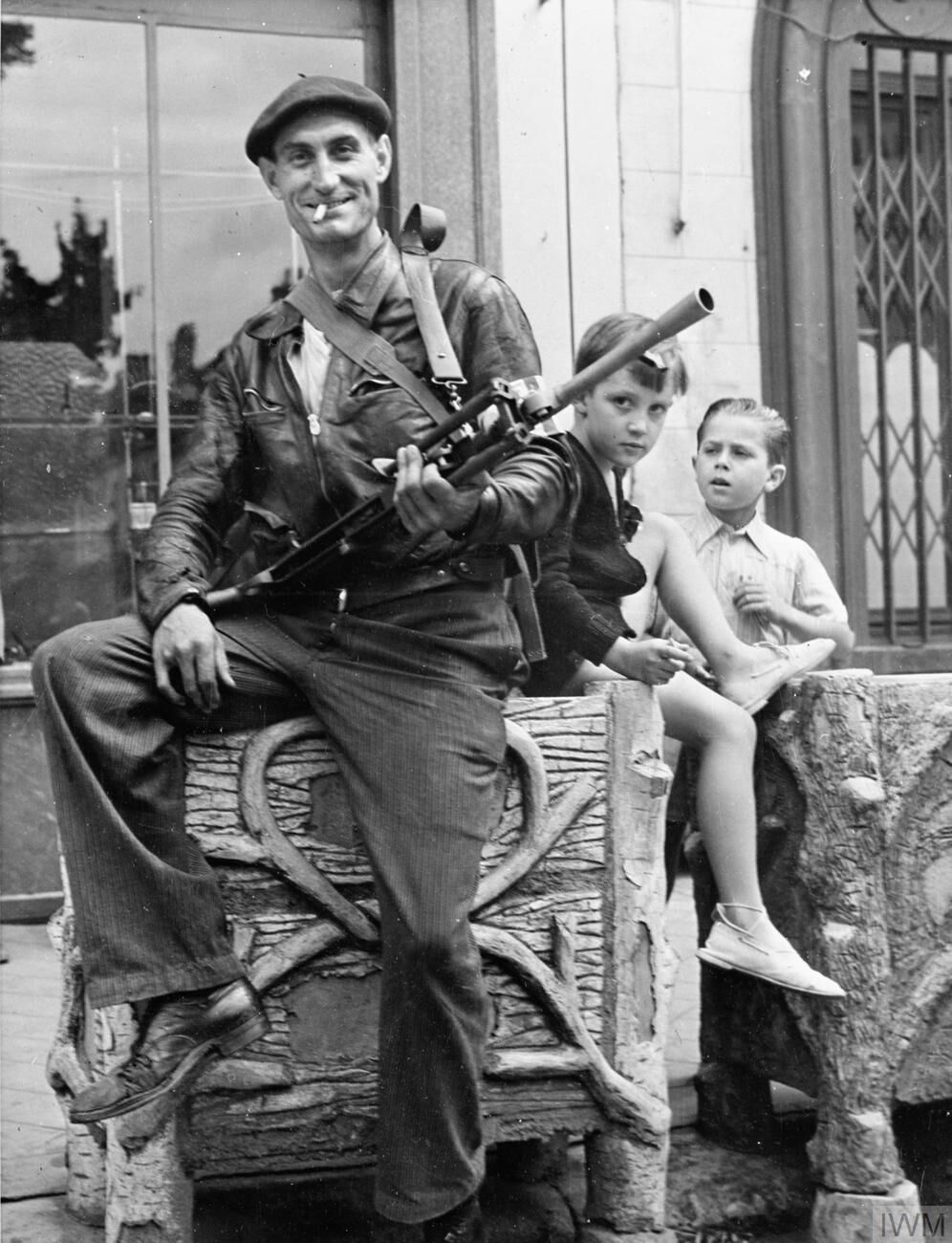
A French Resistance fighter at Chateaudun near the Freteval Forest, 1944.

In April and May 1944, de Blommaert and another Belgian, RAF officer Lucien Boussa, set up a headquarters in the town of Cloyes-sur-le-Loir near the Freteval Forest. De Blommaert persuaded the local armed Resistance group to avoid any activity in the area as it would attract German attention and jeopardize the airmen in the camp. He negotiated with farmers, bakers, and merchants to deliver food to Sherwood Camp and he arranged with Philippe d'Albert-Lake, head of the Comet Line in Paris, and his American wife, Virginia d'Albert-Lake, to set up a system of guides to get airmen from safe houses in Paris to the forest camp. Supplies such as tents were parachuted into the fields near the forest.

The first airmen destined for the Sherwood camp took a train from Paris to Chateaudun on May 20. This was not an easy journey as allied airplanes frequently bombed the railroads. From Chateaudun, guides accompanied the airmen another 15 kilometres (9.3 miles) to Cloyes and placed them in safe houses until the camp was ready for occupancy. On D-Day, June 6, 1944, of the Normandy Invasion, thirty airmen were in the camp. This number expanded steadily to total 152 American and British airmen in Sherwood camp in early August. Virginia D'Albert-Lake was the only casualty among the airmen and guides. The Germans captured her on June 12 while she guided eleven airmen to the camp. She survived the war in a German concentration camp. The Germans arrested ten local people during the operation in the Freteval Forest and six did not return from prison camps.

In August, Airey Neave went to France from England to collect the airmen in forest camps. Neave proceeded to Le Mans which was under control of the American army and about 75 kilometres (47 miles) from the Sherwood Camp. The Germans were believed to have withdrawn from the forest area, but that was uncertain. The American army, suspicious of Neave and the "exotic crowd of armed patriots" that he gathered to effect the rescue, declined to provide him transportation. With difficulty he finally gathered together 16 buses and trucks, "decked with flowers and French flags and guarded by civilians with rifles," plus a few British SAS soldiers. They departed from Le Mans on August 14 for Freteval Forest, returning the same day with 132 airmen. Another 20 were found the next day.

Neave said that most of the 152 airmen rescued in the Freteval forest returned to duty and by war's end 38 of them had been killed.

== Other camps ==
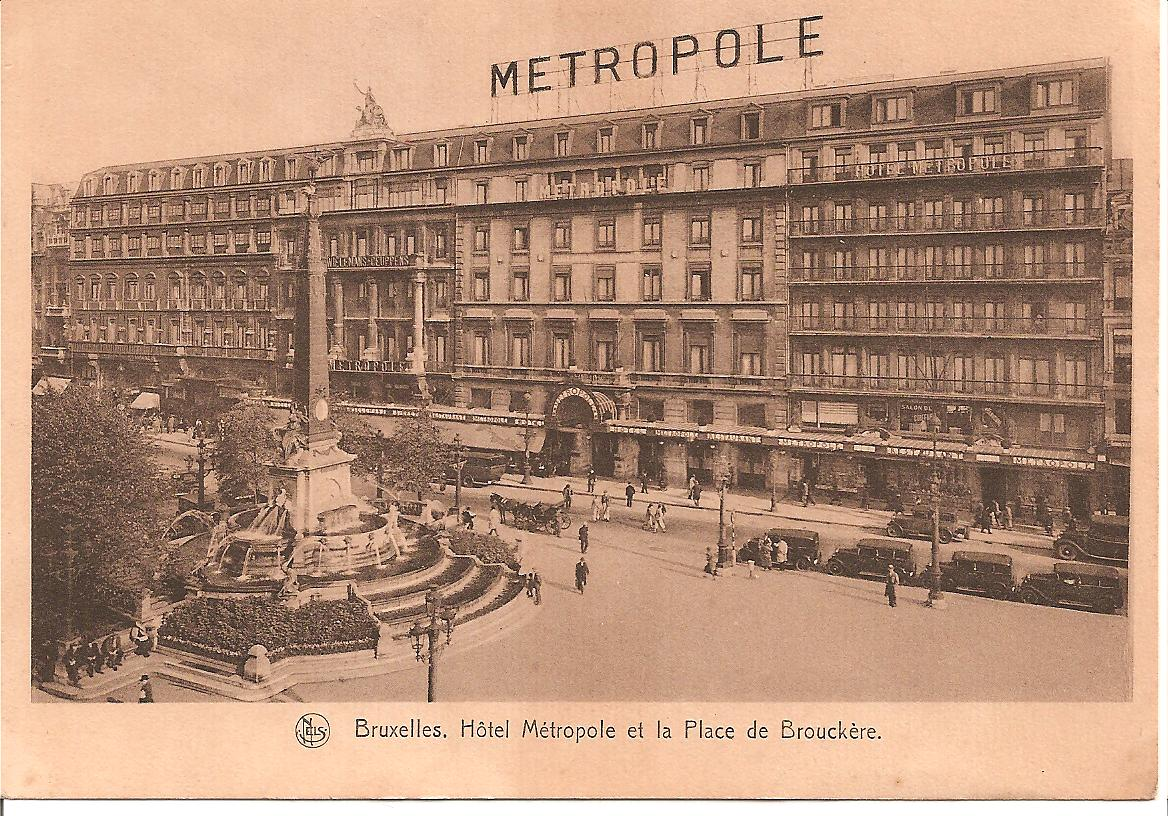
Hotel Metropole, Brussels.

From Le Mans, Neave, de Blommaert, and a crowd of armed men "in jeeps loaded with flowers and champagne" set forth toward Paris. The Comet Line had hidden airmen in several towns and Neave collected them as they traveled, meeting author Ernest Hemingway along the way. Neave and his "army" entered Paris and set up a headquarters for contact with the French Resistance. As soon as the advance of the allied armies made it possible, Neave departed Paris for Belgium to collect the allied airmen he hoped to find hidden there in the Ardenne forest. He arrived in Brussels in early September, just as the Germans were pulling out and the allied armies were entering the city. However, Neave found about 100 airmen and 100 Comet Line helpers at the Hotel Metropole. He believed that the Comet Line, "in the fierce spirit of Belgian independence," had not followed the script drawn up by MI9 and that no camps had been created in Belgium. A riotous party ensued and a large bill for the party was sent to the headquarters of General Dwight Eisenhower, commander of the allied armies. The bill was subsequently paid by Eisenhower's command after much dispute.

The total number of downed airmen were sheltered and rescued by Operation Marathon totaled more than 300. From Belgium, Neave continued on to the Netherlands in Operation Pegasus to rescue more MI9 agents, airmen, and soldiers stranded behind German lines after the failed Operation Market Garden offensive of the allied armies.

== Marathon in Belgium ==
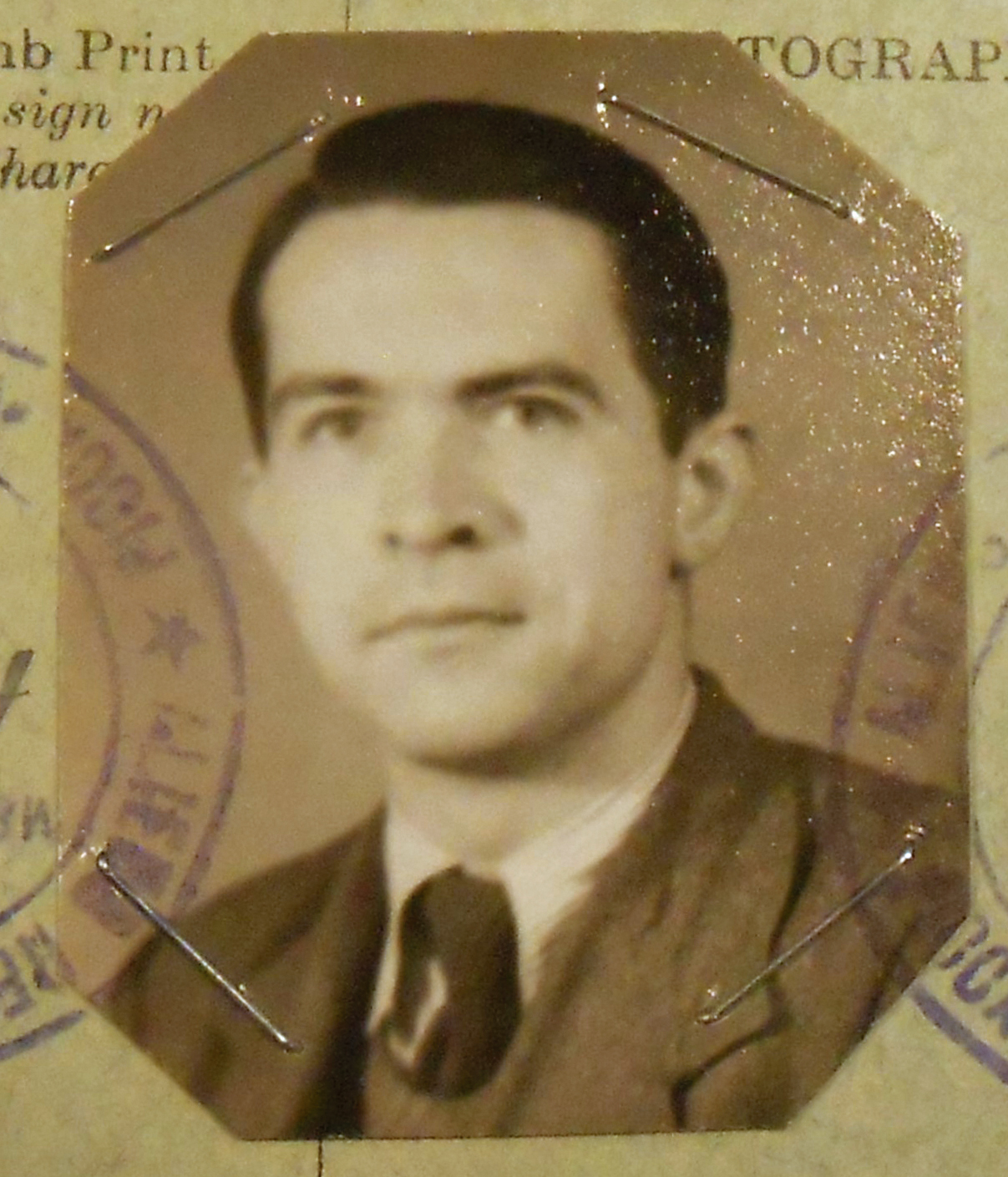
Albert Ancia, head of Marathon in Belgium.

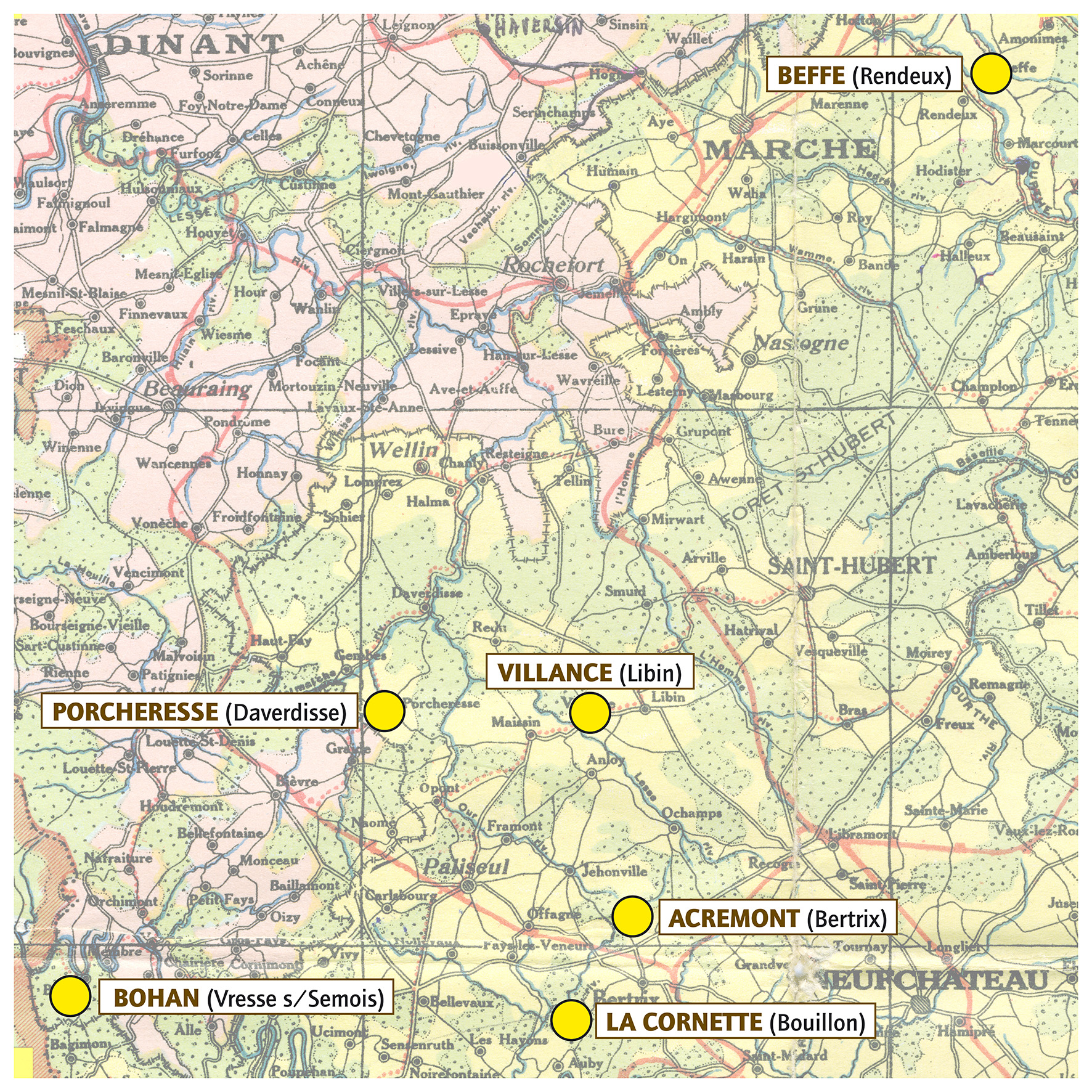
Location of Operation Marathon camps in Belgium.

Neave was mistaken when he said there were no camps in Belgium. Actually, six camps were created in the Belgian Ardenne and they were still active on Liberation day. The Belgian part of the Mission Marathon in France began on April 15 when Jean de Blommaert de Soye and Albert Ancia, the two Belgians parachuted into France a few days earlier, met Yvon Michiels, who was in charge of Comète in Belgium. Michiels accepted the idea of establishing camps in Belgium and put the members of his evasion line at Marathon's disposal. Back in Belgium, he took the first measures and sent agents to explore possibilities in the Ardennes. His successors, José Grimar and Gaston Matthys, worked in the same way. When Albert Ancia arrived in Belgium, he fulfilled the mission, hand in hand with Gaston Matthys. They worked with Belgian members of Comète and other agents especially recruited for the Mission Marathon.

From the places where they were temporarily sheltered, mostly in and around Brussels and Liège, the airmen were guided to the Ardennes by members of Marathon. They traveled by train, car and often by bicycle. There was even a "cyclists road" from Brussels to Namur and, from there, to the camps. The camps were established in Beffe, Porcheresse (Daverdisse), Villance, Acremont, La Cornette and Bohan. At least 109 allied airmen stayed in these camps from June till September, thanks to the Marathon agents, helped by elements of the local population.

The agents in charge of the camps were : Beffe : Vincent Wuyts and his wife Marie Ghislaine Denis; Porcheresse : Emile Roiseux; Villance : Walter Haesebrouck; Acremont : Georges Arnould; La Cornette : Germain Servais and Gaston Matthys; Bohan : Hubert Renault.

== Remembrance ==
On June 11, 1967, Jean de Blommaert and Airey Neave returned to the Freteval Forest to dedicate a stone column commemorating the rescue of the allied airmen. Lucien Boussa had died three months earlier in Cloyes, the same town in which he and Blommaert had established their headquarters in 1944.
