= Virginia d'Albert-Lake =

American French Resistance member

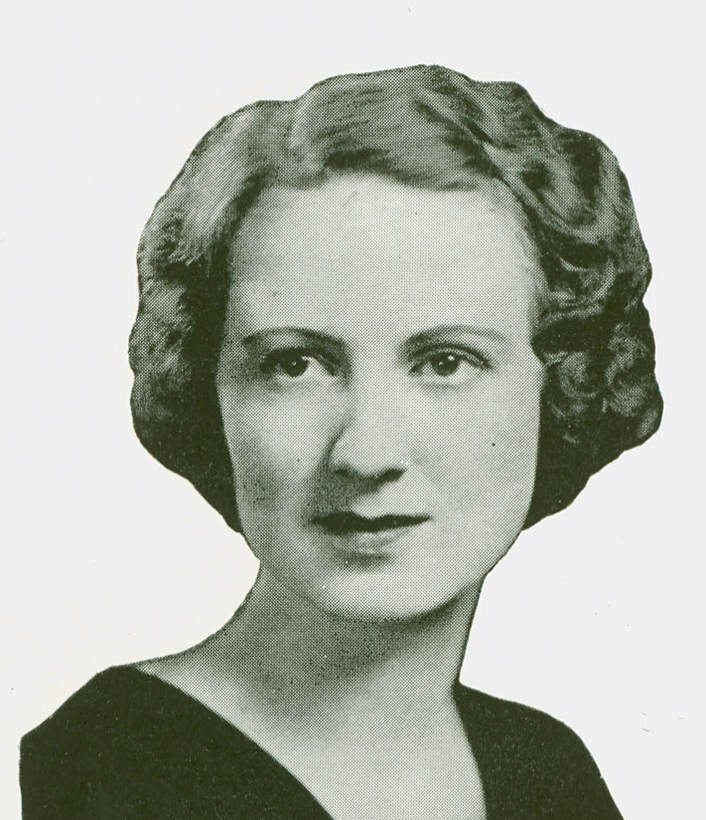
- Virginia d'Albert-Lake in 1935.
- Born: Virginia Roush; June 4, 1910; Dayton, Ohio, United States of America
- Died: September 20, 1997 (aged 87); Near Dinard, France
- Education: Rollins College
- Years active: 1943–1945
- Agent: Comet Line
- Known for: French Resistance, concentration camp survivor
- Awards: Medal of Freedom with Bronze Palm (United States); Order of the British Empire(United Kingdom); Croix de Guerre (France)

Virginia d'Albert-Lake (née Roush; June 4, 1910 – September 20, 1997) was an American member of the French Resistance during World War II. She worked with the Comet Escape Line. She and her husband Philippe helped 67 British and American airmen evade German capture. She was arrested on June 12, 1944, and imprisoned by the Germans in Ravensbrück concentration camp and other camps for the remainder of the war.

== Early life ==
Virginia Roush was born in Dayton, Ohio and raised in St. Petersburg, Florida. On May 1, 1937, she married Philippe d'Albert-Lake, whom she had met in France a year earlier. Philippe had a French father and a British mother. Virginia retained her American citizenship although the couple resided in France. Philippe was in the French army when World War II began in 1939. After France surrendered to Germany in 1940, Philippe was demobilized. Virginia chose to remain in France with Philippe. The couple could not live in the family chateau near Dinard in Brittany because the Germans occupied it. They moved to Paris.

== The Comet Line ==
The d'Albert-Lakes had a country house at Nesles-la-Vallée, 40 kilometres (25 miles) north of Paris. In fall 1943 a baker named Marcel Renard from Nesles came to their home and told them that he was sheltering three American airmen who had been shot down over Europe. Renard needed an English speaker to communicate with the airmen. The d'Albert-Lakes assisted the airmen and became associated with the Comet Line escape network.

In December 1943, Philippe met with Jean de Blommaert, a Belgian working for the British intelligence agency MI9, and became his second-in-command of the Paris sector of the Comet Line. Philippe soon became chief of the Paris Sector which had at the time 29 members (usually called helpers), of whom 21 were women. Virginia became a keeper of safe houses for escaping airmen and a guide. The Comet Line was in crisis in early 1944 due to arrests by the Germans and Virginia was at special risk of being arrested as she spoke French with an American accent and her identity papers showed her birthplace as the United States.

The airmen the Comet Line helped had been shot down or crash-landed in Belgium or France. The airmen were outfitted with civilian clothing and false identity cards and trained to appear European before being transported by train to Paris accompanied by a guide. From Paris another guide, often Michelle Dumon (Michou or Lily), would accompany them by train to near the border of Spain where Elvire de Greef would arrange for them to be smuggled across the border into neutral Spain. From Spain the airmen were returned to the United Kingdom.

Virginia's job was to meet escaping airmen when they arrived at a train station in Paris and house them until such time as arrangement could be made for them to travel southward toward Spain. She hosted 67 airmen in apartments in Paris or in the d'Albert Lake's country home in Nesles.

== Arrest ==
Heavy allied bombing of France in spring 1944 disrupted transportation, especially of railroads, and made transport of downed airmen to Spain more difficult. Operation Marathon was an alternative plan of the British intelligence agency MI9 to gather allied airmen in forest camps where they would await the liberation of France from German control by the allied invasion. One location chosen to shelter downed airmen was the Fréteval forest, 150 kilometres (93 miles) southwest of Paris near the town of Châteaudun. The d'Albert-Lakes took on the task of transporting airmen from Paris to Châteaudun where local people would feed, shelter, and protect them.

On June 12, 1944, six days after the Normandy Invasion of France, the d'Albert-Lakes believed that they were in danger of being arrested by the German secret police, the Gestapo, and decided to abandon their apartment in Paris and take refuge in the Fréteval forest. They departed Paris with eleven airmen. Railroad service was interrupted by allied bombing beyond Dourdan and from there, they broke up into small groups to walk the 85 kilometres (53 miles) to Châteaudun. The next day, just short of Châteaudun, three German soldiers stopped Virginia, who had seven airmen and a guide, Michelle Fredon, with her. One of the Germans spoke French and detected her American accent and also that her identity documents showed she had been born in the United States. She was arrested. Virginia was carrying with her a large amount of money and a list of the names and addresses of contacts in Châteaudun. She tore up the list and swallowed the pieces. One of the airmen was arrested with her. The other six airmen and the guide escaped.

== Imprisonment ==
D'Albert-Lake was initially held in prisons near Paris. She had hope that Allied military forces would soon capture Paris from the Germans and free her, but on August 15, while she could hear allied artillery in the distance, she and many other women prisoners were loaded into boxcars and taken by train to Ravensbrück concentration camp, a camp for women located north of Berlin. Later, she was transferred to the camps of Torgau and Koenigsberg and then back to Ravensbrück. There were only three Americans and a few British in the camp at that time and they received more favorable treatment than the Poles and other nationalities who made up the majority of the prisoners. Rather than the grueling labor forced upon most women prisoners, d'Albert-Lake worked in the prison kitchen.

Treatment of her also improved in early 1945 when the German guards perceived that the war would soon end. On February 28, d'Albert-Lake and a prominent French prisoner, Genevieve de Gaulle-Anthonioz, were transferred to a Red Cross camp at Liebenau where they received the care they needed to survive. D'Albert-Lake weighed only 35 kilograms (77 lb) compared to her pre-war weight of 57 kilograms (126 lb). She said that none of her close friends survived the concentration camps.

D'Albert-Lake was freed by the French army on April 21, 1945, and on May 27 she was back in Paris.

== Post war ==
Virginia's husband, Philippe, had fled France after her arrest. The couple re-united and in 1946 had their only child, Patrick. Philippe went into the antique business and Virginia bought and sold antique dolls to American customers. They lived in a cottage in Brittany on the family's estate near Dinard. She died in 1997, age 87, and is buried in Dinard. Philippe died in 2000.

== Books ==
- d'Albert-Lake, Virginia (2006). Judy Barrett Litoff (ed.). An American Heroine in the French Resistance: The Diary and Memoir of Virginia d'Albert-Lake. Fordham University Press. ISBN 978-0-8232-2581-1.
