= Louis Nouveau =

Louis Nouveau (c. 1896–1966) was a French businessman who worked with the Pat O'Leary escape line (Pat Line) during World War II. The Pat Line helped stranded Allied soldiers and downed airmen escape France which had been defeated by Nazi Germany in June 1940. Nouveau, who was wealthy, and his wife Renée helped finance the Pat Line and gave temporary shelter to 145 allied soldiers and airmen in their Marseille apartment. Nouveau also guided groups of downed airmen from northern to southern France where they were smuggled across the border to Spain and returned to the United Kingdom.

In February 1943, Nouveau was arrested by the German occupiers of France and spent the remainder of the war in Buchenwald concentration camp. His wife Renée and son Jean-Pierre escaped to England. Nouveau survived the concentration camp and was awarded the George Medal for his wartime service.

== Background ==
The Dunkirk evacuation of France by British forces in June 1940 left thousands of British and Allied soldiers stranded on the European mainland. Most surrendered or were captured by the Germans, but about 1,000 made their way to Vichy France, unoccupied by the Germans and nominally self-governing, especially the coastal city of Marseilles where many took refuge in the British Seaman's Mission headed by a Presbyterian minister named Donald Caskie.

Nouveau was a wealthy and sophisticated businessman and commodity trader in Marseilles. He was passionately and openly pro-British and anti-German and the German-influenced government of Vichy France. He still suffered from being gassed while a French soldier in WW I. Nouveau was described as one of the soldiers he aided as a" slightly austere, no-nonsense person, brave and dedicated to working for the reseau (line)." Nouveau's wife was named Renée. The couple had one son, Jean-Pierre Nouveau. Jean-Pierre fled France in January 1941 and joined the Free French army, receiving the Legion of Honor for his wartime service.

== The Pat line ==
In December 1940 the Nouveaus met Ian Garrow at a tea party. Garrow was a British soldier who had begun work in Marseilles to organise the escape to Britain of British soldiers and airmen stranded in France. Nouveau offered his help and was turned down by Garrow. However, Garrow soon realized that he needed Nouveau's help to raise money to finance the escape line's operations. Nouveau donated money and raised five to six million francs (more than $400,000 in 2024 U.S. dollars) for Garrow and the escape line. Most of the money was in loans to be paid back after the war ended. A major expense was to pay guides to lead escapers across the border from France to Spain, a highly hazardous undertaking. Garrow's incipient escape line became what is known as the Pat O'Leary Line which helped more than 600 soldiers and airmen escape France.

Besides fund raising, the Nouveaus sheltered 145 escaping airmen and soldiers and eleven French refugees between May 1941 and February 1942 in their luxurious apartment. This number is precise because Nouveau recorded details about each in the hinge of volume 44 of his 70 volume edition of Volaire's works. Nouveau also wrote about the 42 journeys he undertook for the Pat Line. He was instrumental in establishing branches of the Pat line in Brittany, Pas de Calais, and Normandy which involved finding safe houses and recruiting couriers and guides.

== Arrest and imprisonment ==
Working for the escape lines became more dangerous after the Germans occupied Vichy France in November 1942. At the same time the numbers of downed airmen needing evacuation to Spain was increasing as more allied bombers were shot down over western Europe. Renée Nouveau fled France and spent the rest of the war working for Charles De Gaulle's Free France organization in London. Louis refused to leave and moved to Paris to supervise operations there. The Pat Line was soon destroyed by the Germans with many of its operatives arrested. Nouveau was arrested by the Germans near Tours in February 1943 while accompanying a group of five American airmen by train from Paris to Toulouse. He was betrayed by Roger Le Neveu who he had recruited as a guide for the Pat Line. Nouveau was sent to Buchenwald concentration camp where he spent the duration of the war.

After his liberation from the concentration camp in April 1945, Louis Nouveau moved back to Marseilles and resumed his business ventures. He was given the George Medal by the United Kingdom for his wartime work. His wife Renée was awarded the MBE. He died in 1966; Renée was still alive in the early 1980s and living in Aix-en-Provence.
