= George Rodocanachi =

British physician

- Born: 27 February 1875; Liverpool, England
- Died: 1944 (aged 68–69); Buchenwald concentration camp, Nazi Germany
- Citizenship: France (from 1915)
- Occupation: Doctor
- Years active: 1903–1944
- Spouse: Fanny Vlasto
- Children: Constantine (b. 1908)
- Awards: Croix de Guerre (WWI); Legion d'Honneur (WWI)

George Rodocanachi (27 February 1875 – 10 February 1944) was a British-born physician of Greek descent who lived in Marseille, France during World War II. He worked with the Pat O'Leary escape line (Pat Line) during the war. After France's defeat and partial occupation by Nazi Germany in June 1940, the Pat Line helped stranded Allied soldiers and downed airmen escape France. Rodocanachi also aided Jewish refugees fleeing occupied Europe to gain admittance into the United States.

== Biography ==
Rodocanachi was born in Liverpool, England, to a Greek family, his parents were Theodore and Arghyro Rodocanachi. He studied in Marseille, received his medical degree in Paris in 1903, and opened a pediatric practice in Marseille. In 1907 he married Fanny Vlasto in London and they settled in Marseille. Their only child Constantine was born in 1908.

At the outbreak of World War I, Rodocanachi was working in a children's hospital in Marseille. In 1915 he gained French citizenship and joined the Chasseurs Alpins. He served in Alsace and at the Somme, was once gassed and twice wounded, and received the Croix de Guerre and the Legion d'Honneur. After the war he returned to his practice.

During World War II, after Vichy France had accepted an armistice with Nazi Germany, Rodocanachi made contact with the British Seaman's Mission in Marseille and treated British soldiers who had missed the evacuation at Dunkirk. After the mission was closed by the Milice, he met Elisabeth Haden-Guest and begun to work with her to hide escapees and Jewish refugees. When Ian Garrow founded what became known as the Pat O'Leary Line, Rodocanachi's home in Marseille became one of the main safe houses of the network. Garrow also stayed there until the French police arrested him in 1941.

With the help of his wife and couple of associates, Rodocanachi aided numerous people, many of them Allied airmen who had been shot down over Nazi-occupied Europe. He hid them in his house and arranged false identity papers until they could be helped to escape either across the Pyrenees or to a Royal Navy submarine.

Rodocanachi also helped refugee Jews gain admittance to the United States. The U.S. consulate named him examining doctor for Jewish immigrants. He used his position to provide medical certificates to justify their entry into the USA.

Rodocanachi was also nominated to the medical board of the Michel-Lévy Hospital. The board made medical examinations to determine whether prisoners of war were unfit for military service and hence could be repatriated. Rodonacachi did his best to have as many men as possible declared unfit. The board ceased to function when the Germans occupied rest of France.

The secret work took its toll and his angina pectoris got worse over the years.

Eventually the Pat Line was betrayed. On 25 February 1943 Rodocanachi was arrested at his home by six Gestapo. His wife later suspected that the house concierges had notified the Germans. Rodocanachi persisted in treating the other inmates in prison. On 17 December 1943 Rodocanachi was moved to a prison in Compiègne, and on 17 January 1944 he was transferred to the Buchenwald concentration camp. He died there on 10 February of pneumonia.

== See also ==
- Rodocanachi
