= Marie-Louise Dissard =

French resistance fighter (1881–1957)

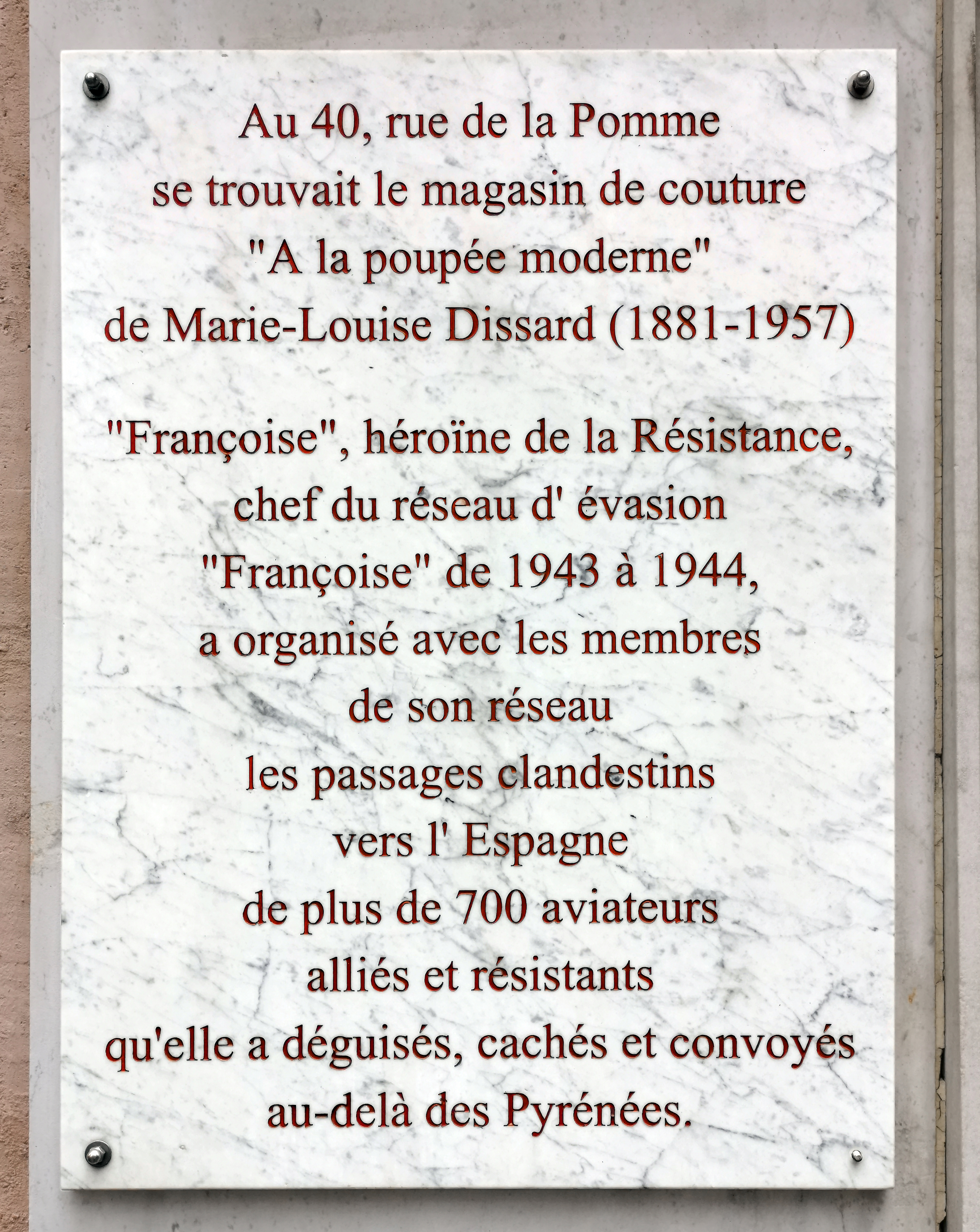
- Plaque honoring Dissard in Toulouse.
- Born: Marie-Louise Dissard; 6 November 1881; Cahors, France
- Died: July 1957 (aged 75); Toulouse, France
- Years active: 1940–1945
- Agent(s): Pat O'Leary Line, Francoise Line
- Known for: French Resistance
- Awards: Medal of Freedom (United States); George Medal (United Kingdom); Légion d'honneur (France); Croix de Guerre

Marie-Louise Dissard, OBE GM (6 November 1881 – July 1957) (code named "Françoise"), was a member of the French Resistance during the German occupation of France in World War II. She initially worked with the Pat O'Leary Line, a network which helped downed Allied airmen evade German capture and return to Great Britain. The O'Leary Line was first headed by Ian Garrow and later by Albert Guérisse. In 1943, after their arrests and the destruction of the O'Leary Line by the German Gestapo, Dissard created an escape network called the Francoise Line. The Francoise Line helped more than 250 Allied airmen escape occupied France and return to Great Britain. Including her work with the O'Leary line, Dissard helped more than 700 allied airmen escape from France. She received financial assistance from the British intelligence agency, MI9.

Dissard was honored with the Legion of Honor by France, the George Medal by the United Kingdom, and the Medal of Freedom by the United States. She shares the distinction of being one of very few women to head World War II resistance organizations in France, another prominent woman leader being Marie-Madeleine Fourcade. Andrée de Jongh, head of the Comet Line which operated in France, was Belgian.

== Before World War II ==
Marie-Louise Dissard was born in Cahors, the daughter of Guillaume and Leontine Dissard. Guillaume was a teacher and Leontine a fashion designer. Dissard worked as a secretary for the government of the city of Toulouse. A talented seamstress, she later opened a small dressmaking shop selling "modern feminine frivolities." She never married and was an advocate for female independence and freedom. Dissard was small, cheerful, talkative, opinionated, and anti-fascist. She seemed never to sleep and to survive on black coffee and cigarettes held in a long, ivory holder which was always in her mouth. She was followed around by her pet cat named Mifouf. The French police considered her mentally unbalanced.

== The Pat O'Leary Escape Line ==
Fifty-eight years old when France surrendered to Germany in June 1940, Dissard first resisted the Germans by distributing anti-Nazi propaganda in Toulouse for the "Bertaux Network." In December 1941 the leader of that group and several of his followers were arrested and imprisoned by French police. Dissard cooked food for the resisters and took it to the prison two or three times a week. In early July 1942, she met Paul Ullman who was working for the O'Leary escape network. He told her he was hiding English airmen, shot down over Europe, in his home and organizing their escape to Spain. She began to shelter downed airmen in her own apartment and rented a villa in Toulouse to shelter more airmen. She used the code name "Françoise." By December 1942, she was the leader of the O'Leary line in Toulouse. She enlisted guides and found safe houses for airmen on the run from the Germans. She supplied the airmen with food (mostly purchased on the black market due to rationing), civilian clothing, and medicine, running the line out of her small apartment in the shadow of Gestapo headquarters. She arranged escape routes over the Pyrenees to Spain for airmen and sometimes accompanied them for part of their journey. She also organized the escape of six resistance members and two American airmen from a French jail.

The occupation of Vichy France by German forces in November 1942 made resistance to the Germans more dangerous as German authorities and the Gestapo stepped up efforts to infiltrate and destroy the escape lines operating in France, Belgium, and the Netherlands and funneling downed airmen toward safety in neutral Spain. Conscious of the increased danger to its members, the O'Leary line arranged the escape of founder Ian Garrow from a French prison on 6 December 1942. Garrow stayed in Dissard's apartment until he could be smuggled to Spain and return to Great Britain. On 2 March 1943 the leader of the O'Leary Line, Albert Guérisse, was arrested by the Gestapo.

== The Françoise Line ==
Françoise lived hidden in granaries, garages, and cellars from where she directed operations. She was a master of disguise, appearing one day as a weeping widow, another as a peasant, a third as an eccentric old woman.

MI9 officer Airey Neave said that with the arrests of Guérisse and other members of the Pat O'Leary Line, "Dissard and her cat were almost the only survivors of the O'Leary organization." Dissard assumed leadership of the remnants which came to be called the Françoise Line after her code name. Fearing arrest, she fled Toulouse temporarily for Bergerac and relocated nine fugitives to new safe houses, including four airmen and a courier for the O'Leary Line, Nancy Wake, arranging for their passage to Spain. Lacking funds, she then made a clandestine journey to Switzerland and arranged with a British Vice Consul, Victor Farrell, to continue to fund the Line. With regular payments from the British ensured, she reorganized the many safe houses and helpers of the Line scattered all over southern France. She herself escorted airmen by train from various cities and towns to Toulouse and onward to Perpignan where the airmen were turned over to guides who escorted them across the Pyrenees to Spain. Her deputy was Jean Bregi, an associate from the O'Leary Line.

In January 1944, one of her guides was captured and had the address of her safe house in Toulouse in his notebook. She managed to escape arrest, move airmen to new safe houses, and, with the Gestapo on her trail, hid out in attics and basements in Toulouse. She eventually returned to live surreptitiously in her apartment which was near Gestapo headquarters. With her freedom of movement limited, a young man named Gabriel Nahas who was experienced in moving Jews across the Spanish border became the principal escort of airmen from Toulouse to Perpignan.

The German occupation of France ended after an allied invasion in summer 1944. Dissard had helped rescue and repatriate more than 250 allied airmen. The escape organizations were labor-intensive and Dissard recommended 123 of her helpers, including 24 women, for postwar awards.

== Honours and awards ==
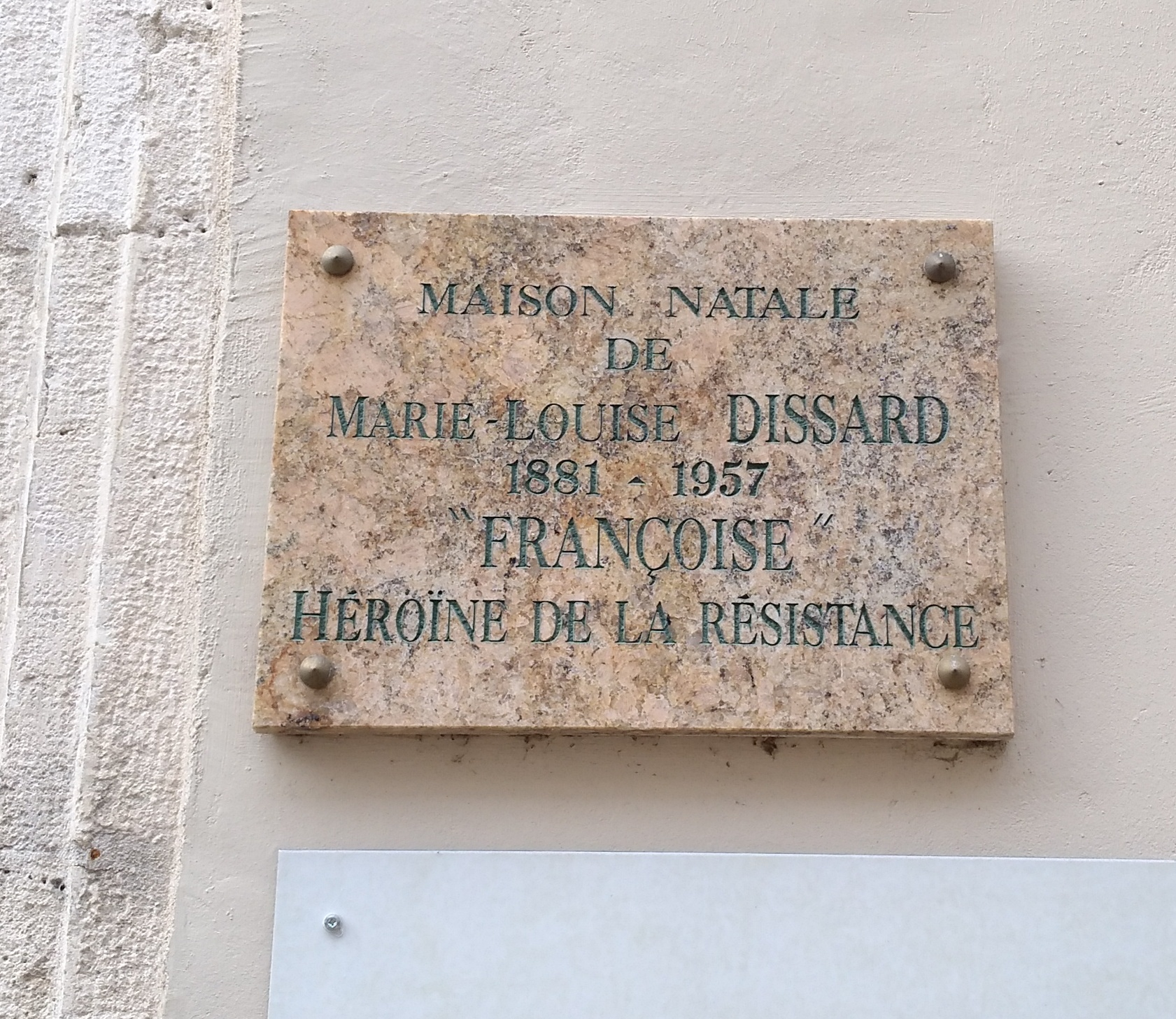
A plaque at Dissard's birthplace in Cahors.

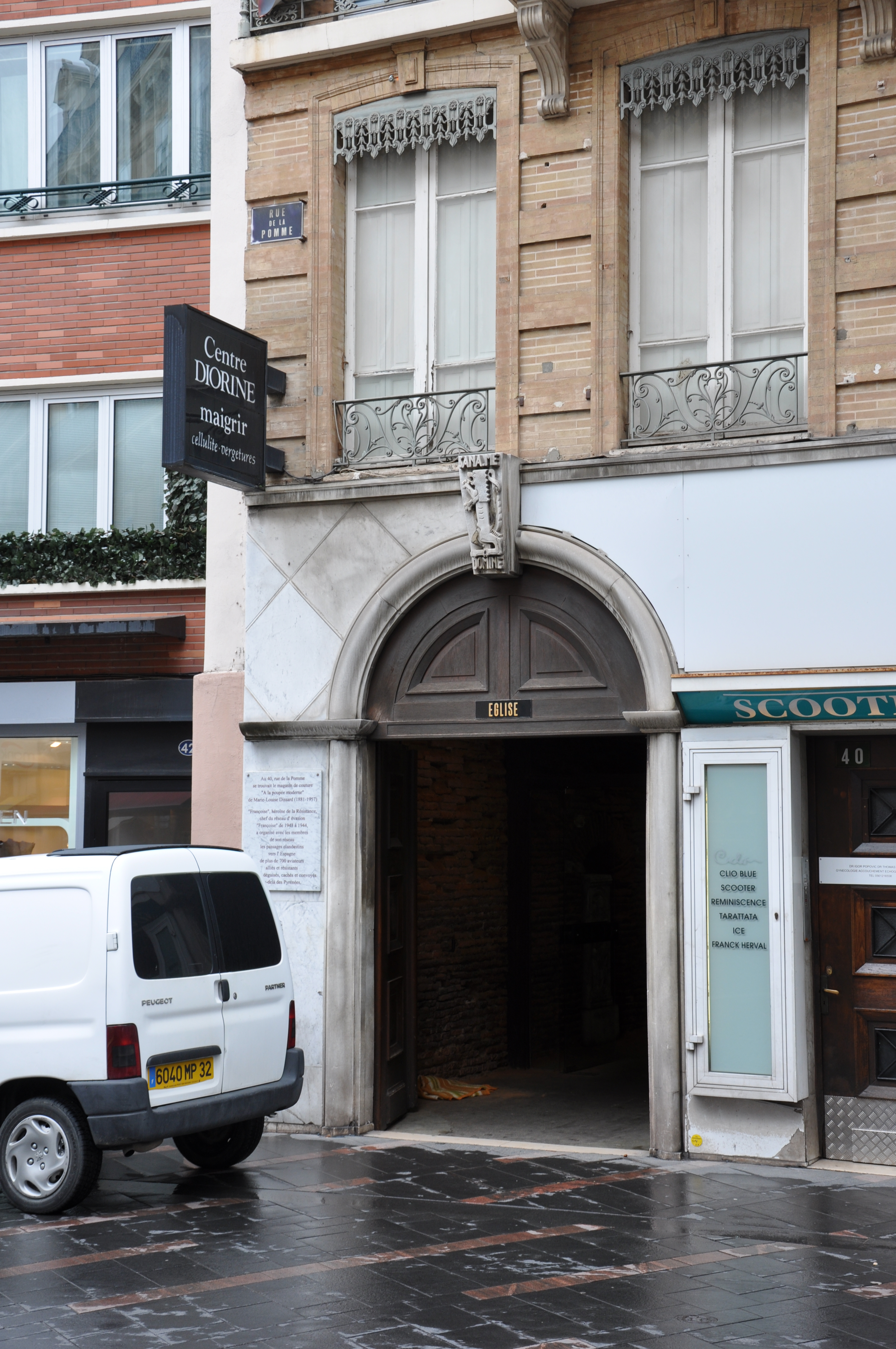
The location of Dissard's shop, 40 Rue de la Pomme, Toulouse.

After the war, the United Kingdom awarded her the George Medal, a very senior decoration, and the United States awarded her the Medal of Freedom, the highest civilian award in the U.S. In Toulouse, the Lycée professionnel Marie Louise Dissard Françoise was named in her honor. A street, the Rue de Marie-Louise Dissard, in Toulouse is named after her.

France

- Officer of the Legion of Honour
- Croix de Guerre 1939-1945 with palms
- Médaille de la Résistance with rosette (17 May 1946)

Belgium

- Officer of the Order of Leopold II, with palms
- Belgian Croix de Guerre with palms, 1940–1945

United Kingdom

- George Medal
- Honorary Officer of the Order of the British Empire (OBE)

United States

- Medal of Freedom with Gold Palm
