= Albert Guérisse =

Belgian Resistance fighter

Albert Guérisse aka Pat O'Leary
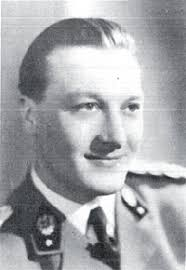
- Born: 5 April 1911; Brussels, Belgium
- Died: 26 March 1989 (aged 77); Waterloo, Belgium
- Military career
- Allegiance: Belgium; United Kingdom
- Rank: Major General
- Nicknames: Lt. Cdr. Pat O'Leary, RNVR
- Commands: "Pat Line"; Belgian medical detachment, Korea; Belgian medical component
- Conflicts: World War II; Korean War
- Awards: George Cross; Knight Commander of the Order of the British Empire (honorary); Distinguished Service Order

Major General Count Albert-Marie Edmond Guérisse GC, KBE, DSO (5 April 1911 – 26 March 1989) was a Belgian Resistance member who organized French and Belgian escape routes for downed Allied pilots during World War II under the alias of Patrick Albert "Pat" O'Leary, purportedly the name of a peace-time Canadian friend. His escape line was dubbed the Pat O'Leary Line.

== Biography ==
Guérisse was born in Brussels, and qualified in medicine at the Université Libre de Bruxelles before joining the Belgian Army. Guérisse was Médecin-Capitaine with a Belgian cavalry regiment during their eighteen-day campaign in May 1940. He managed to escape to England through Dunkirk. At Gibraltar, he joined the crew of a former French merchant ship, Le Rhin, which was later renamed HMS Fidelity and served in the Mediterranean on clandestine missions. He secured entry into the British Royal Navy and was commissioned as Lieutenant Commander Patrick Albert O'Leary RNVR of French-Canadian origin. The "Canadian" identity attempted to explain his not-quite British accent in English, and his not-quite French accent in French, in order to protect his family in occupied Belgium if he was captured. He had a six-week undercover training session with Naval Intelligence. Until April 1941, he was serving mainly as a conducting officer, escorting agents ashore in small boats through the surf, whilst the large vessel lay some distance offshore. This was skilled work, exposed to physical dangers from the sea-conditions and operational dangers from the Vichy security services.

On 25 April 1941, during a mission to place Special Operations Executive (SOE) agents in Collioure, on Roussillon coast in southern France, "O'Leary" and three crewmen from HMS Fidelity were arrested by the Vichy French coast guard and taken to a camp for British military prisoners at Saint-Hippolyte-du-Fort near Nîmes. Helped by 'fellow British' officers, "O'Leary" escaped in early June 1941. He went to Marseille where there was an escape organisation run by a British Army officer, Ian Grant Garrow, and soon made contact. At this point his intention was make his way to Gibraltar and resume his original naval service. Events were to dictate otherwise because Garrow wanted "O'Leary" to stay and help with the organisation since he had undercover training and, unlike Garrow, spoke French fluently. Consequently, a request was sent to London that he stay, which was approved and confirmed by a BBC radio message received on 2 July 1941. (Note: Fidelity was lost with all hands when torpedoed in the South Atlantic on 31 December 1942.) "O'Leary" immediately began his job : within a four-month period, he helped about fifty men escape from the prison of St Hippolyte du Fort, then moved them down the line back to England through the Pyrenees.

When the Vichy France authorities captured Garrow in October 1941, Guérisse took over as chief of the escape network. Along with others, including Nancy Wake, he smuggled a guard uniform to Garrow in his cell in Mauzac prison camp, which helped Garrow's escape on 6 December 1942. At this point the British decided it was time for Garrow to return to London, so "O'Leary" continued in command and expanded the reach of the escape line's operations. The line carried over 600 escapees to Spain and back to Britain.

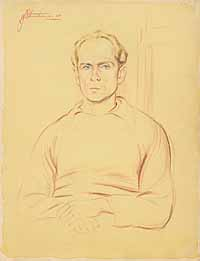
"Pat O'Leary" concentration camp portrait by Brian Stonehouse

In January 1943, the escape line was infiltrated and betrayed by a French turncoat, Roger le Neveu; Guérisse was arrested in Toulouse on 6 March 1943. En route to prison he managed to get one of the younger members, Fabien de Cortes, to escape and warn the British. After his arrest the line was taken over by Marie Dissard. Guérisse told nothing to the Gestapo interrogators even while being tortured. He then was sent to a series of concentration camps, including Mauthausen. No one, neither in the network, nor the French police nor the Gestapo, ever knew "O'Leary's" true identity.

In the summer of 1944, he was at the Natzweiler-Struthof concentration camp in Alsace with another SOE agent, Brian Stonehouse. At the camp he witnessed the arrival of four other female SOE agents, Andrée Borrel, Vera Leigh, Diana Rowden, and Sonya Olschanezky, who were all executed and disposed of in the crematorium in an attempt to make them disappear without a trace, under the "Night and Fog" programme. After the war, Guérisse and Stonehouse were able to testify at the Nazi war crimes trials as to the women's fate.

Finally, Guérisse was taken to the Dachau concentration camp, tortured again and then sentenced to death. However, when SS guards surrendered before the Allied advance, Guérisse took command and refused to leave until the Allies agreed to take care of the inmates. On 30 April 1945, he was chosen as the first president of the International Prisoners' Committee that administered the camp after liberation.

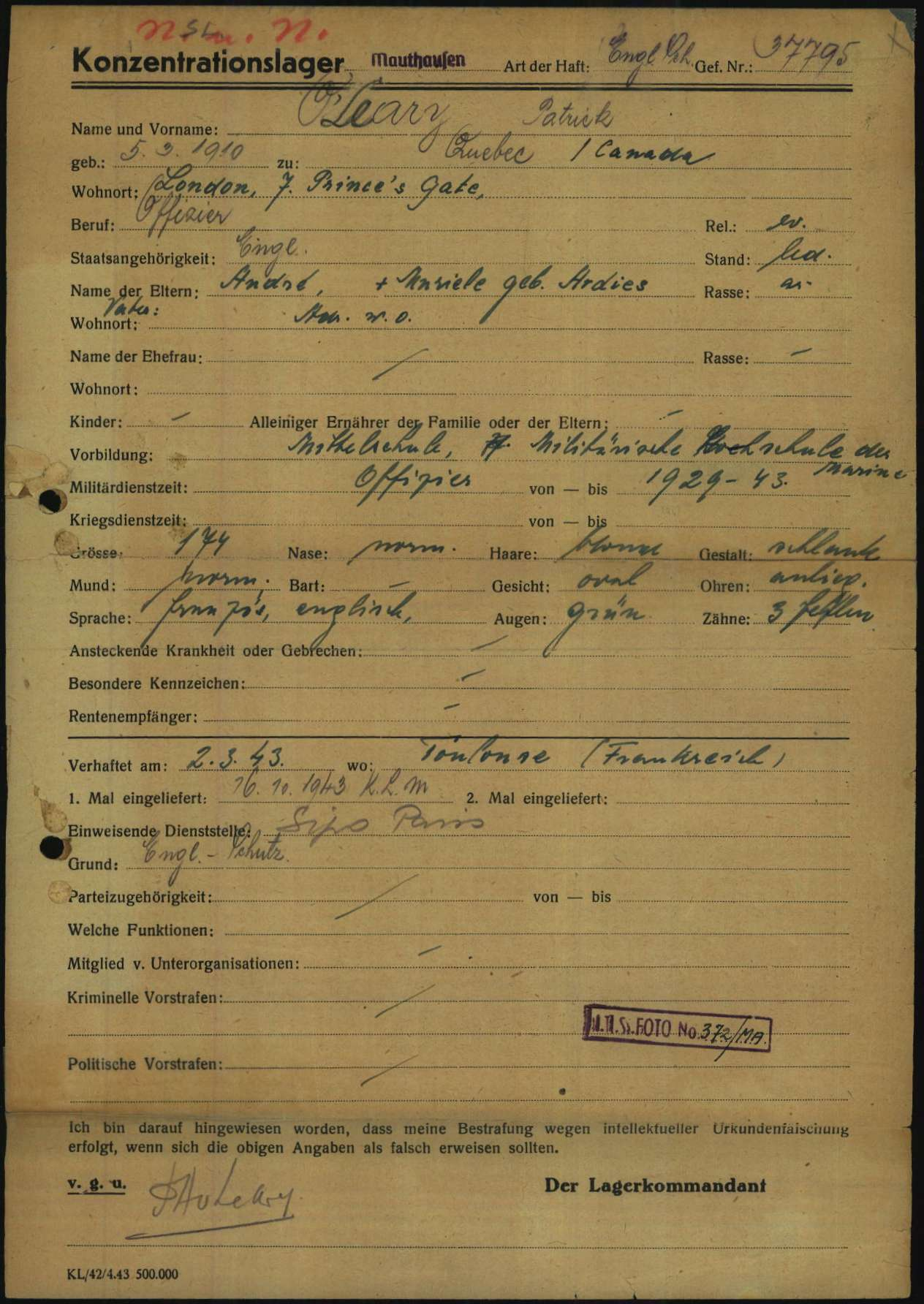
Registration form of "Patrick O'Leary" as a prisoner at Mauthausen

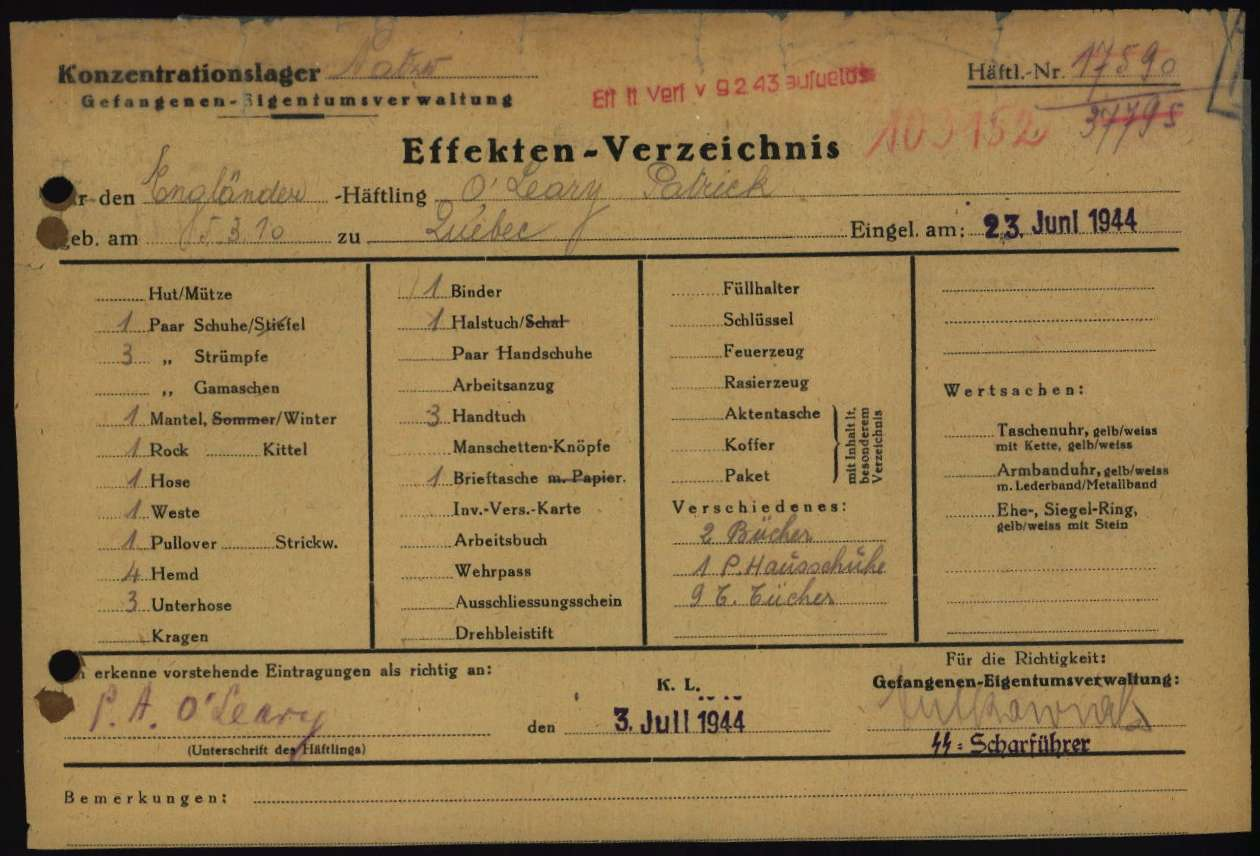
List of personal effects at Natzweiler

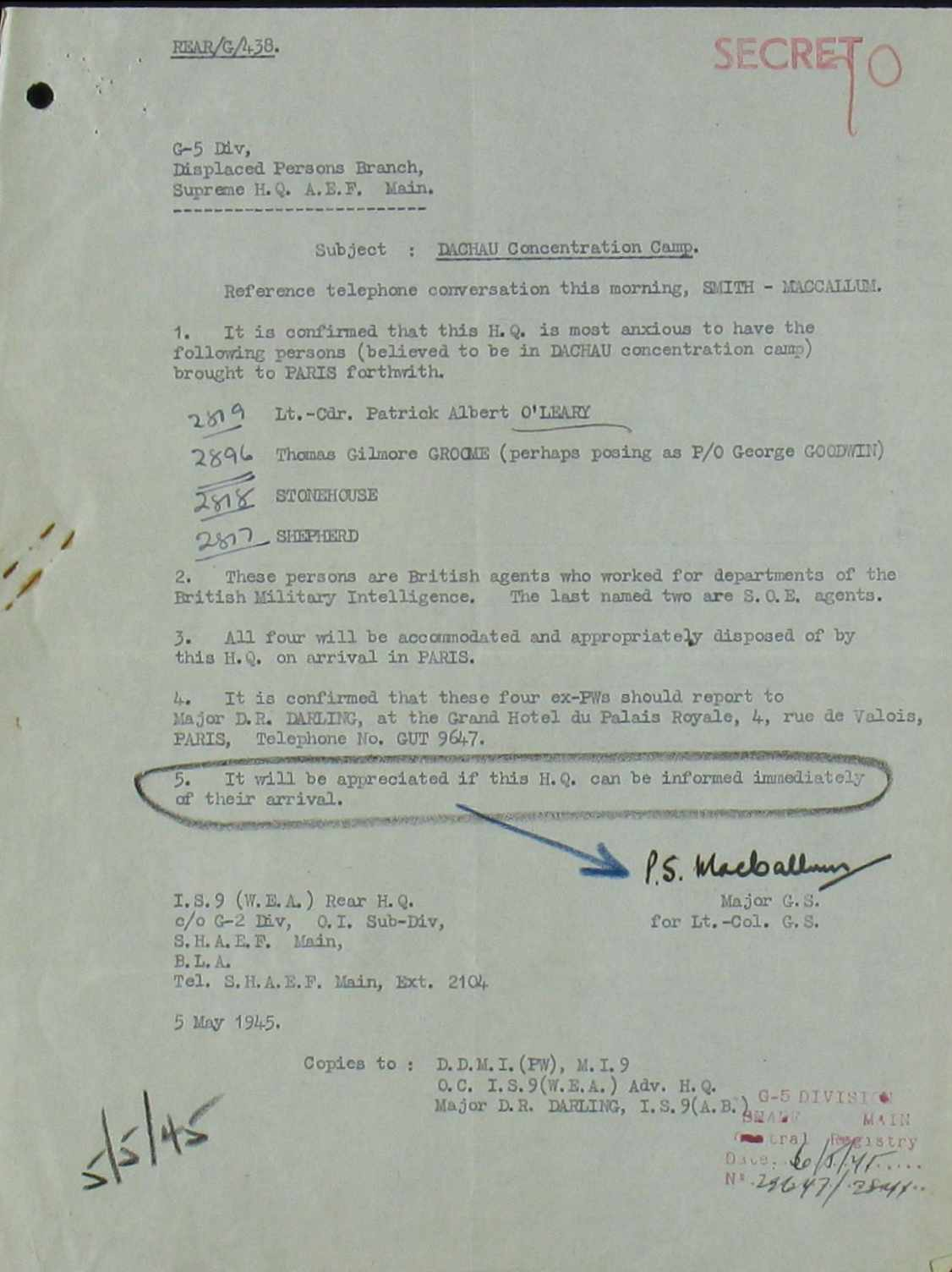
Request (stamped "SECRET") for his repatriation after the liberation of Dachau

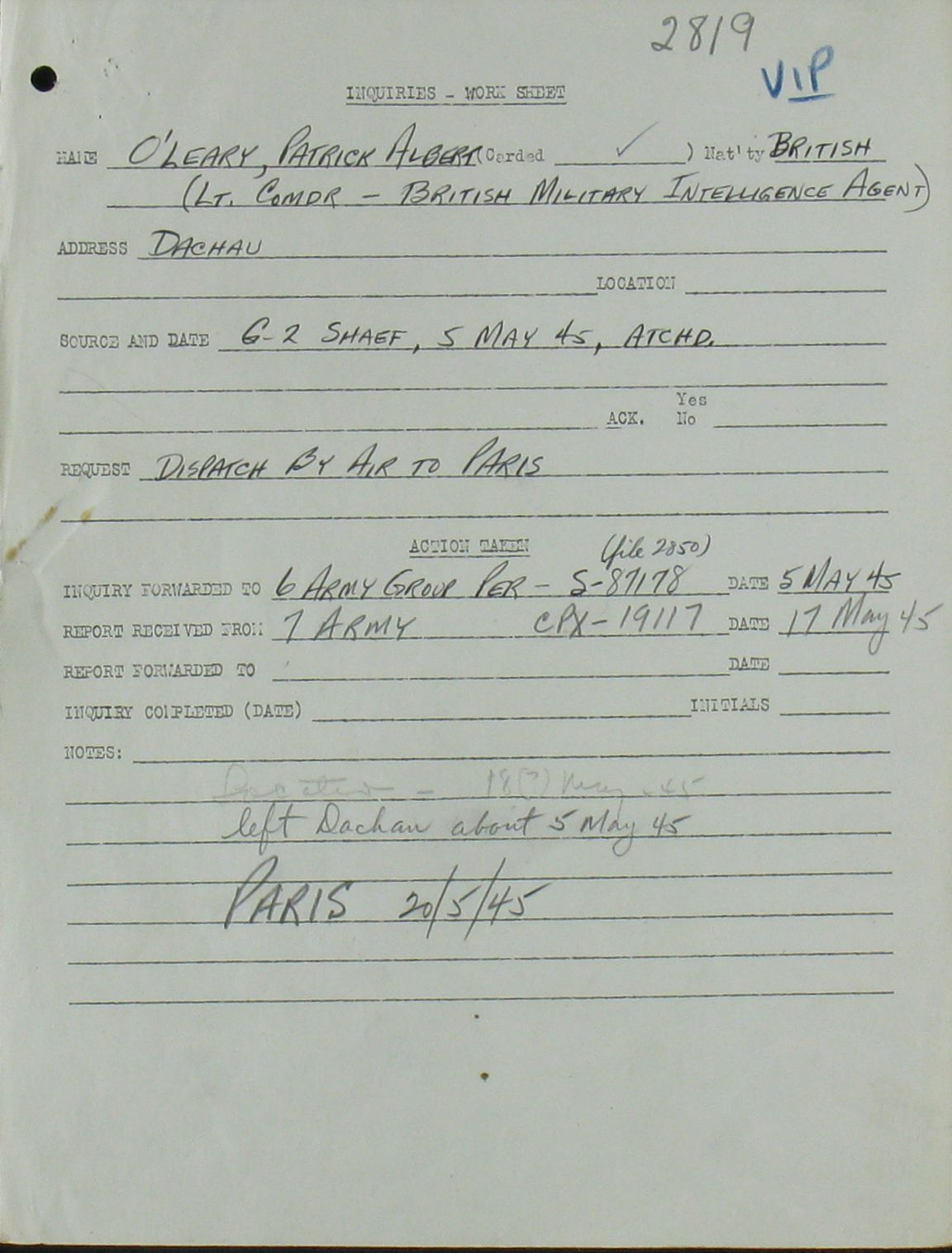
Worksheet on the request for the repatriation of "Patrick Albert O'Leary" (labelled "VIP")

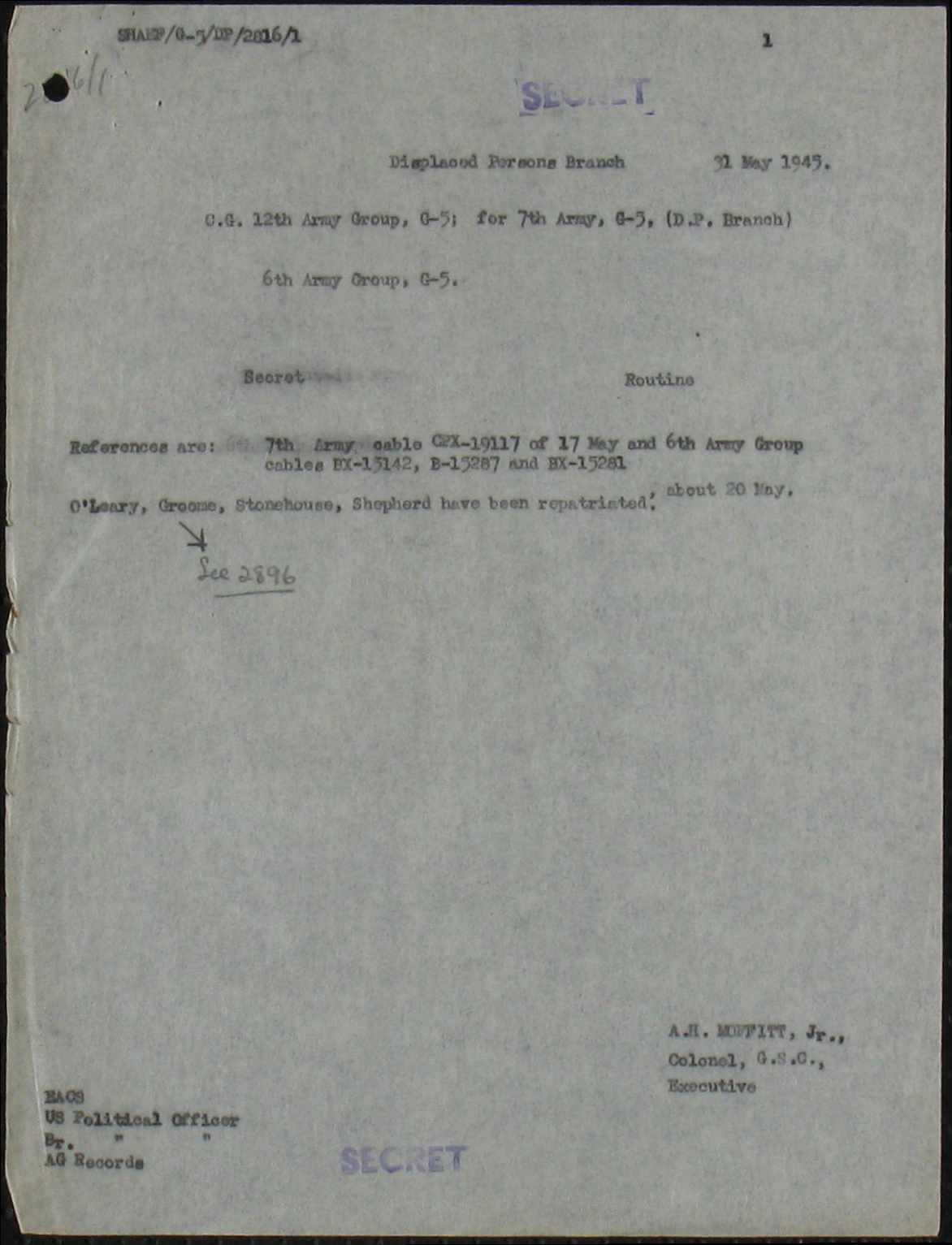
Report (stamped "SECRET") on his repatriation

From its founding in 1956 until his death he served many terms as president of the Comité International de Dachau, and regularly gave the keynote speech at the May memorial ceremonies.

In 1946, he was appointed a member of the War Crime Commission at Nuremberg. In November 1946 he was demobilized from the Royal Navy and resumed his real name and rejoined the Belgian Army, returning to his former regiment. In 1951, he volunteered as a medical officer for the Belgian United Nations Corps in Korea during the Korean War where he was wounded while going to rescue a wounded soldier under enemy fire. He became the head of the medical service of the Belgian Army and retired in 1970, in the rank of major general.

== Personal life ==
In his personal life, he married Sylvia Cooper-Smith in 1947; they had a son, Patrick. Sylvia Guérisse predeceased her husband.

He was the subject of This Is Your Life in November 1963 when he was surprised by Eamonn Andrews at the BBC Television Theatre.

== Awards and decorations ==
General Guérisse received 37 decorations, from a variety of nations. In 1946, the British recognised his war service with the award of the George Cross. This was the highest possible award of the British Commonwealth nations for actions not in combat and only the Victoria Cross (the equivalent award for bravery in actual combat) takes precedence.

In the UK it is the convention for the post-nominal letters for both these awards to be appended to the surname even for general usage, i.e. to refer to: 'Guérisse, GC'. Recognising his military service as a whole, the British later also conferred on Albert-Marie Guérisse, GC, an honorary knighthood (KBE).

Similarly, the King of Belgium recognised the lifetime service of General Guérisse with the grant of a peerage in 1989, in the rank of Count. His motto: Honores non-quaero, fidelis sum (Honors I do not seek, faithful I am).

== Death ==
General Count Albert-Marie Guérisse died in Waterloo, Belgium on 26 March 1989, aged 77.

== Reading ==
- Vincent Brome, The Way Back, Cassell and Company (London), 1957 (ASIN: B000ZRBLPQ)
