= Dutch-Paris line =

Underground network in occupied Europe

Dutch-Paris Escape Line
- Leaders: Jean Weidner, Edmond "Moen" Chait, Jacques Rens
- Dates active: 1942–1944
- Country: The Netherlands, Belgium, France, Switzerland, Spain
- Size: 330 men and women
- Part of: Dutch, Belgian and French resistance
- Wars: World War II

The Dutch-Paris escape line was a resistance network during World War II with ties to the Dutch, Belgian, and French Resistance. Their main mission was to rescue people from the Nazis by hiding them or taking them to neutral countries. They also served as a clandestine courier service. In 1978, Yad Vashem recognized the Dutch-Paris's illegal work of rescuing Jews by honoring the line's leader, Jean Weidner (aka Johan Hendrik Weidner) as Righteous Among the Nations on behalf of the entire network.

== Summary ==
Dutch-Paris was a transnational resistance network composed of over 330 men, women, and teenagers living in occupied France, Belgium, and the Netherlands, as well as neutral Switzerland. Between 1942 and 1944, they rescued approximately 3,000 people from the Nazis, mostly Jews, resisters, labor draft evaders, and downed Allied aviators. They supported some of these people in hiding and smuggled others into neutral Switzerland or Spain. Dutch-Paris also acted as a clandestine courier service throughout western Europe for the Dutch government-in-exile, other resistance groups, churches and families. Dutch-Paris claimed no national, political or religious affiliation.

In 1978 Yad Vashem recognized the entire Dutch-Paris line as Righteous Among the Nations in the person of their leader, Jean Weidner, also known as Johan Henrik Weidner and John Henry Weidner.

== History ==
Dutch-Paris began as separate grass-roots rescue operations in different cities during the spring and summer of 1942 when the Nazi occupation authorities started deporting Jews from the Netherlands, Belgium and France. The local groups organized themselves in Brussels, Paris and Lyon when Jews who were trying to get to Switzerland asked for help.

In Brussels, members of the Dutch expat community who were mostly businessmen and students created a Comité tot Steun voor Nederlandsche Oorlogsschlactoffers in België (Committee for the Support of Dutch War Victims in Belgium) that found hiding places for Jews and supported them with money, false documents and ration cards. Another category of fugitives known as Engelandvaarder (Dutch men and women who made their way out of occupied Holland to England) asked the committee for help getting to Spain. Some of the people the Comité helped asked a member of the group for help; others were passed to them by other resistance groups in Belgium and the Netherlands. For example, one of the leaders of the Comité, Benno Nijkerk, also served as treasurer of the Comité de Défense des Juifs en Belgiquë (Committee for the Defense of Jews in Belgium).

In Paris several Dutch expats began helping Dutch Jews and Engelandvaarders either on their own or in separate groups. One of these groups was led by a minor official at the Dutch embassy, Herman Laatsman.

In Lyon, a Dutch expatriate named Jean Weidner and his wife, Elisabeth Cartier, created an escape line for Jews. They took the fugitives through the town of Annecy and over the Swiss border near the village of Collonges-sous-Salève. Cartier made sure that every one of their proteges had legal permission to remain in Switzerland as a refugee.

Finding enough money to support the people they were helping posed a constant problem for all of these rescuers. In the fall of 1943 the Dutch ambassador in Switzerland, who was loyal to the Dutch government-in-exile in London, offered Weidner a deal. The London Dutch would fund Weidner's rescue operations if he (1) expanded his escape line to reach from the Netherlands to Spain as well as to Switzerland and (2) created a courier relay to convey microfilms between the Dutch Resistance and a Dutch representative in Geneva (the Swiss Way). In exchange, Weidner would bring certain Dutch citizens from the Netherlands to Spain so they could travel on to England to join the Dutch government-in-exile or the Allied forces. Weidner, however, would retain complete control over clandestine operations in occupied territory. He accepted.

Weidner and his lieutenants, Jacques Rens and Edmond "Moen" Chait, expanded the network through Belgium and into the Netherlands by linking up with the Comité in Brussels and Dutch resisters in Paris. They agreed to join the new network because Weidner offered them money they sorely needed as well as a secure route for Engelandvaarders and Allied aviators to Spain. Weidner, Rens and Chait chose Toulouse as their base for the trip over the Pyrenees into Spain. But because there was no Dutch resistance group in Toulouse, Weidner and his colleagues joined with French resisters who were already taking fugitives to Spain.

The full escape line known as Dutch-Paris started taking fugitives from the Netherlands through Belgium and France to Spain and Switzerland in November 1943. In January 1944 they began taking downed Allied aviators. The line continued to function until the liberation of Belgium in September 1944, but not without serious trouble.

== Arrests ==
Helping downed Allied aviators increased the danger to everyone involved in Dutch-Paris because it attracted the attention of the highly professional and successful German police in the Abwehr (German military intelligence). German and French police questioned Weidner and some of his colleagues in 1943 regarding the escape of Jews, but without serious consequences. In February 1944, however, French police who belonged to a wartime collaborationist unit arrested a young Dutch woman who was working with Dutch-Paris as a courier and guide. The French police turned her and one of her colleagues in Paris over to the Germans. The Germans tortured her and threatened her parents. She broke under the physical and psychological pressure and answered their questions. Two weeks later, German police units in Paris executed a coordinated raid on all Dutch-Paris addresses in the city associated with the aviator escape route to Spain.

Two days later, German police units arrested other members of Dutch-Paris in Lyon, Annecy and Brussels. In France the arrests continued sporadically into June 1944. Many of the men and women who were arrested were tortured and most were deported to concentration camps.

The Germans, however, were unable to capture the leaders of Dutch-Paris, Weidner, Rens and Chait. Nor did they find the people involved with helping Jews to hide and/or escape. Dutch-Paris was able to rebuild its networks and continue to support people in hiding, although they took many fewer fugitives to Spain after February 1944.

Separately and due to a case of mistaken identity, the French Milice (paramilitary collaborators) arrested Weidner, Rens and a courier named Paul Veerman in Toulouse in May 1944. All three managed to escape. Veerman, however, was rounded up for forced labor on the streets of Brussels in June 1944 and was kept in Germany until the end of the war. One other Dutch-Paris resister in Brussels, Hans Wisbrun, was also rounded up off the streets and deported as forced labor.

At least 40 fugitives – Jews, resisters, aviators – were arrested while under the care of Dutch-Paris. Some of them died in concentration camps. Out of the 320+ members of Dutch-Paris, 65 are known to have been arrested. Most of them were tortured. Some escaped or were released. Thirty-eight were deported to concentration camps as political prisoners. The Comité in Brussels was able to arrange for the resisters captured at the safe house on the rue Franklin in February 1944 to be detained in Belgium instead of being deported. Fourteen men and women of Dutch-Paris died in German custody.

== Escape routes ==
As a network, Dutch-Paris began in Brussels but they worked with a number of allied local Dutch groups who brought Dutch men and women and downed Allied aviators over the Dutch border into Belgium. Many of the aviators crossed the border near Maastricht with the help of the Groep Vrij. Many Jews crossed near Hilvarenbeek with the van der Heijden-Smit group. And two Dutch-Paris couriers, Willy Hijmans and Piet Henry, brought Engelandvaarders over the border near Putte.

Dutch-Paris had a safehouse on the rue Franklin in Brussels, where they prepared fugitives to continue to France. Jo Jacobstahl made connections with other resistance groups in Belgium to find Allied aviators in hiding, bring them to Brussels and prepare them for their onward journey. They took most of them on the international night train to Paris.

Dutch-Paris hid Engelandvaarders and aviators in several places in Paris, including the basement of the physics laboratories of the École Normale Supérieure, hotels, and farms outside the city near Gazeran. They used the trains to take fugitives onward to Switzerland or Spain.

To reach Switzerland, Dutch-Paris went by train to Lyon and then to Annecy. From Annecy they usually took fugitives to the border by bus but they also used taxis and even an ambulance. Dutch-Paris crossed the Swiss border in the Genevois valley, near Geneva. The terrain is flat enough there that even children and the elderly could manage the crossing if they were careful to avoid patrols.

The crossing to Spain through the Pyrenees in the Haute-Garonne was much more difficult. If everything went smoothly, it took a minimum of two nights to walk through the dark over the mountains and across the border into Spain. Things usually did not go that well because of the weather or the heavy concentration of police and border troops in the area. In February 1944 Austrian alpine troops surrounded a hut on the Col du Portet d'Aspet, where a Dutch-Pairs convoy of aviators and Engelandvaarders had taken shelter from a blizzard. Half of the men were arrested and most sent to concentration or POW camps. Because the trek through the Pyrenees required local knowledge and connections, Dutch-Paris relied on three local passeurs (mountain guides) to take convoys of men to Spain.

As a safety precaution, the leaders of Dutch-Paris had their own safe houses and their own routes between cities. They also separated the microfilm relay from the escape lines. But the same person often acted as a courier for the microfilm and messenger along the escape routes because they did not have enough people to truly separate all of the network's tasks.

== Document smuggling ==
During the Nazi occupation international communications were censored and unreliable. It was very difficult for families to even send letters to each other. It was extremely dangerous for resisters to communicate except by talking in person to each other. It was also impossible to legally send money across borders. Dutch-Paris therefore had to use couriers to arrange their rescues. The couriers often agreed to take messages and documents from individuals and resistance groups on their travels. Without meaning to, they became a clandestine international courier service that carried personal letters, cash, and resistance documents such as plans of military installations and lists of the names and addresses of Jewish children hiding in Brussels.

More officially, Dutch-Paris also served as part of the Swiss Way – A that smuggled information between the Dutch Resistance in the Netherlands and the Dutch government-in-exile in London. Pastor Willem Visser 't Hooft oversaw the Swiss Way. These more official documents were converted into microfilms and hidden in fountain pens, flashlights and the like. The Swiss Way route was separate from the escape line, using different locations and passwords. But by necessity, the Dutch-Paris couriers who carried microfilms also carried messages for the escape line. There were not enough resisters to do otherwise.

== Funding ==
It cost a lot of money to rescue people from the Nazis. Everything fugitives needed – false documents, ration cards, food, shelter, medical care – had to be bought on the black market. It was also impossible for a full-time resister who was constantly engaged in the illegal work of rescue to hold down a job or stay in a permanent home. They also needed false documents, food, shelter and train tickets. When the resisters in Brussels, Paris and Lyon first started helping the persecuted in 1942 they paid for the expenses from their own pockets or with the money of the people they were helping. Dutch-Paris never turned anyone away because they did not have money. But eventually the resisters ran out of their own money. They raised funds by asking their social circles for money or schemes like selling false documents.

In early 1943 Jean Weidner went to Switzerland (illegally) to ask the Dutch ambassador there for funds to help Dutch citizens in occupied France. The ambassador was sympathetic but had to consult with the Dutch government-in-exile in London. In the meantime, Pastor Willem Visser ‘t Hooft, general secretary of the World Council of Churches in Formation, gave Weidner money and connections to help the fugitives. After the ambassador in Bern got permission from London, the Dutch government-in-exile paid most of Dutch-Paris’s expenses. The British and American military attaches paid for the return journeys of their own personnel through their military attaches. On average it cost 30,000 French francs (equivalent to 160 British pounds) to get an aviator from the Netherlands to Spain.

The problem of converting currency into local cash for use in train stations, hotel, restaurants, cobbler shops etc, however, continued. The Nazis controlled the flow of currency very closely. The resisters of Dutch-Paris came up with several ingenious schemes to move money around Europe, many of them involving their personal or business bank accounts in different countries.

== Successes ==
Dutch-Paris had a longer lifespan compared to most escape lines and was largely successful in rescuing people. They helped approximately 3,000 men, women and children survive Nazi persecution.

The most famous people who they took to Spain were Bram van der Stok and Gerrit Jan van Heuven Goedhart. Van Heuven Goedhart was a Dutch jurist and influential Dutch resister with a price on his head. After the war he became the first United Nations High Commissioner for Refugees. Van der Stok was a Dutch pilot who flew in the RAF. He was part of the famous "great escape" from Stalag Luft III.

== People ==
Dutch-Paris was a network of 330+ men, women and teenagers who lived in the Netherlands, Belgium, France and Switzerland. They did not all know each other or even speak the same language. They did not share a common nationality, political affiliation or faith. But they all had the courage to oppose the Nazis. Some resisters joined because they saw a problem and decided to help. Others were recruited to help a family member or friend. And others were recruited because they had access to something the line needed, such as information about police movements, access to identification document forms and population registers, hotels or farms suitable for hiding, or food.

Dutch-Paris was built out of interlinking circles of Dutch expatriates in Belgium and France. Most of the full-time members of the network – leaders, couriers, guides – had some personal connection to the Netherlands and spoke Dutch. But the majority of the men and women in Dutch-Paris were Belgian and French. Likewise, many but not all of the people who Dutch-Paris helped were Dutch. It was Dutch-Paris policy to help whoever needed help. But because the rumor of their help circulated among Dutch refugees, any of those who asked for help were Dutch. The 120 Allied servicemen helped by Dutch-Paris came from the UK, the US, Canada and Australia.

The members of Dutch-Paris included:

- John Weidner was a Dutch businessman, and can be seen as the leader of Dutch-Paris.
- Herman Laatsman was a Dutch diplomat, and was among the top leaders of Dutch-Paris.
- Benno Nijkerk was one of the main associates of Jean Weidner, he was Jewish and founder of the Belgian CDJ
- Jaques Rens was a fluent French speaking Dutch youth.
- David Verloop was an intelligent law student, who coordinated Dutch-Paris in Belgium from Brussels. After his arrest, he took his own life to prevent himself from torture and possible betrayal of other members.
- Edmond Chait was a fluent French speaking son of a timber merchant from Rotterdam.
- Jan aan de Stegge full name was E.H.J. aan de Stegge. He was a priest, and was also referred to as father Aan de Stegge, Chaplain or Monsieur l'Abbe. He was dedicated to guide refugees and allied personnel from Toulouse to Spain, and a keyman in organizing shelters and food in the vicinity of Toulouse.
- Paul Ph. Veerman was an important document smuggler. In 1943 he was recruited by the Dutch Military Attaché in Bern for information services between Switzerland, Belgium and Spain.
- Jef Lejeune also written as Joseph Le Jeune was a student criminology at the university of Leuven. He was one of the leaders in the Amsterdam-Brussels sector, in particular to operations in The Hague.
- Hans H. Wisburn picked up fugitives from the Netherlands, which he then escorted to a shelter in Brussels, and often took them as far as to Paris thereafter. He was not just responsible for the transport, but food, clothing and false papers as well.
- Willem Visser 't Hooft was working for the World Council of Churches in Geneva and played a key role in the smuggling of documents to London and obtaining funds for Dutch-Paris from the Dutch authorities in exile.
- Suzanne Hiltermann-Souloumiac alias Touty played an important role in the protection inside Paris and repatriation of allied pilots (Paris-Toulouse). Her role is described in the French edition of Wikipedia Dutch Paris. She was arrested by the Nazi and sent to Ravensbrück concentration camp. After she was saved by the "white buses" of the Comte Bernadotte, President Truman expressed his gratitude by giving her the distinguished Medal of Freedom.
- Gabrielle Weidner sister of Jean Weidner, helped to coordinate escapes from Paris. Deceased in Ravensbrück concentration camp.
- Jean Michel Caubo was bureau chief at the Gare du Nord in Paris, where his office offered a shelter for refugees. His wife and their two sons were involved in resistance work. Deceased in Dautmergen concentration camp.
- Vital Dreyfus was a French doctor in Paris who guided refugees on their crossing of the border between France, Switzerland and Spain.

== Sources ==
Online

- "Jewish Rescue Activities in Belgium and France" by Lucien Steinberg
- "Escape Lines in Europe in WWII - The Royal Air Forces Escaping Society in 1994 - (2003)"
- "The Dutch Escape Lines - WW2 Escape Lines Memorial Society"
- How to Flee the Gestapo – Searching for the Dutch-Paris Escape Line – PhD M. Koreman
- The Weidner Foundation
- (in Dutch) "De handen vrij voor het verzet: 1943-1945"

In print

- Carper, Janet Holmes. The Weidners in Wartime: Letters of Daily Survival and Heroism under Nazi Rule, Weidner Foundation Books, 2020.
- Chanel, Lionel and Yannick Mouely, Résister à la Nuit, Editions Palanaquée, 2019.
- Koreman, Megan. The Escape Line: How the Ordinary Heroes of Dutch-Paris Resisted the Nazi Occupation of Western Europe, New York: Oxford University Press, 2018.
- Koreman, Megan. Gewone Helden: de Dutch-Paris ontsnappingslijn, Amsterdam: Uitgerverij Boom, 2016 (translation of The Escape Line).
- Koreman, Megan, "War's Long Shadow," Notre Dame Magazine, Spring 2020, pp. 30–35.
- Ford, Herbert. Flee the Captor, Nashville, TN: Southern Publishing Association, 1966.
- Steinberg, Lucien. Le Comité de défense des Juifs en Belgique, 1942-1944. Brussels: Eds. Université de Bruxelles, 1973.
- Weidner, Jean. "De Weg naar de Vrijheid" in Onderdrukking en Verzet: Nederland in Oorlogstijd, ed JJ van Bolhuis. Arnhem: van Loghum Slaterus, 1949–1954, vol. 3, 730–739.
- Zeeman, Pieter Rudolph. Luck Through Adversity: The Memoir of a Dutchman's Flight to Freedom Through the Dutch-Paris Escape Line of WWII, Weidner Foundation Books, 2020.
