= Jean-Marie Faux =

Belgian Jesuit author (1923–2022)

Jean-Marie Faux SJ (9 November 1923 – 2 May 2022) was a Belgian Jesuit author, translator, professor, and theologian.

== Biography and work ==
Faux was born in 1923. He lived for thirty years in the small commune of Schaerbeek. During this time he became director of the Centre AVEC, a social and analysis center founded by the Jesuits in Brussels. He then moved to Woluwe in 2006. When the community there ended, he moved to La Colombière.

Faux was a professor at the Institut d’études théologiques (I.E.T.) in Brussels. In 1977 he published the study La foi du Nouveau Testament. In 2010 he published De la société multiculturelle au dialogue interculturel: étapes de la réflexion politique en Belgique for the Centre Avec. The same year he argued against the ban on the full veil. In 2015 he translated Le recontre mondiale des mouvements populaires au Vatican from Italian into French.

Faux was involved in several associations working for human rights. He was the general secretary of the Belgian MRAX, a movement against racism and xenophobia based in Brussels.

In 2018, he was still in charge of the Belgian Center AVEC. Faux died on 2 May 2022 at the age of 98.

== Bibliography ==
- French: Hertz et Hava Jospa, in : Jean-Philippe Schreiber (ed.), Hertz Jospa, juif, résistant, communiste, Editions Vie Ouvrière - Mrax, Bruxelles, 1997, 160 p. ISBN 2870033362 ISBN 978-2-87003-336-4
