= Suzanne Hiltermann-Souloumiac =

Dutch French Resistance member (1919–2001)

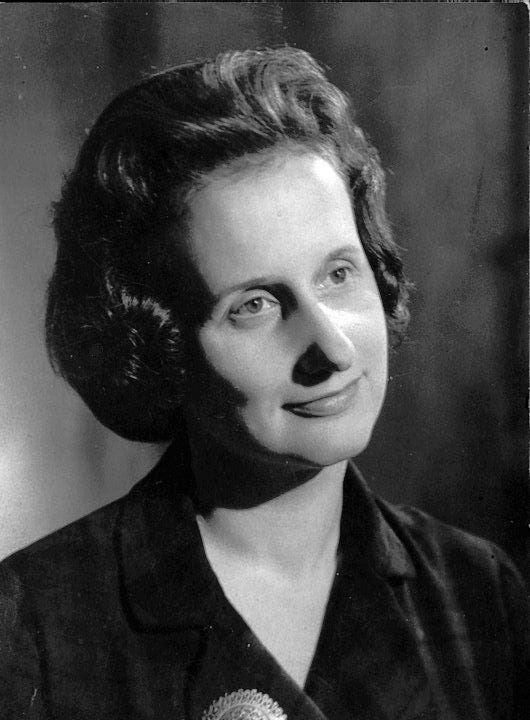
Suzanne Hiltermann-Souloumiac, 1960

Suzanne 'Touty' Hiltermann-Souloumiac, née Hiltermann, (17 January 1919, Amsterdam – 2 October 2001, Désaignes, Ardèche) resisted the Nazis as part of the Dutch-Paris escape line during World War II. She survived Ravensbrück concentration camp. She received the US Medal of Freedom in recognition of her help to evading Allied airmen. After the war she wrote children's stories and founded a French school in Hong Kong.

== Early life ==
Suzanne Hiltermann was born to a family of Dutch magistrates and industrialists. She spoke French, English and German fluently - and a little bit of Hebrew and Chinese too. In 1939, she enrolled in the Sorbonne in Paris to study ethnology.

== Resistance ==
In the first months of the German Occupation of France, Hiltermann met a Dutch official named Herman Laatsman. She soon joined him in his resistance work helping Jews to escape to the southern, unoccupied zone and gathering intelligence. Hiltermann worked closely with Leo Mincowski, who worked as a translator in the German Embassy in Paris. A German diplomat, Karl-Heinz Gerstner, passed information to Mincowski and Hiltermann. They shared it with Laatsman and a local French resistance group to which Mincowski belonged.

In November 1943 Laatsman agreed to link his group in Paris to the escape line that Jean Weidner was putting together. Laatsman, Hiltermann, Mincowski and their colleagues took primary responsibility for taking care of downed Allied aviators coming through Paris for the new escape line, called Dutch-Paris. Because Hiltermann spoke English, she acted as liaison with the aviators hiding in and around Paris. Hiltermann found other Allied aviators hiding in the region through her connections with local French resistance groups. Hiltermann also served as a courier and guide between Paris and Toulouse, escorting aviators on the night train. Dutch-Paris helped at least 112 Allied aviators and servicemen.

== Arrest ==
French police arrested a Dutch-Paris courier in Paris on 11 February 1944 and turned her over to the Germans a few days later. On 26 February 1944, German forces coordinated raids on all Dutch-Paris addresses in Paris that were associated with the aviator escape line. They raided Hiltermann's apartment on the rue du Laos at 6:30am. She was interrogated several times and subjected to the “baignoire” torture. She was deported to the women's concentration camp at Ravensbrück on 18 April 1944.

== Deportation ==
Hiltermann was kept with the French prisoners in Ravensbruck. She formed life-long friendships there with Geneviève de Gaulle-Anthonioz, Jacqueline Pery, Simone Souloumiac and Germaine Tillion. When 17 year-old Simone Souloumiac despaired, Hiltermann encouraged her by saying, “Hold on! We need to see the end of the movie.”

Hiltermann was liberated from Ravensbrück on 23 April 1945 on the “White Buses” sponsored by the Swedish Red Cross. After a short recuperation in Sweden, Hiltermann returned to Paris on a special US Army Air Force repatriation flight.

== After World War II ==
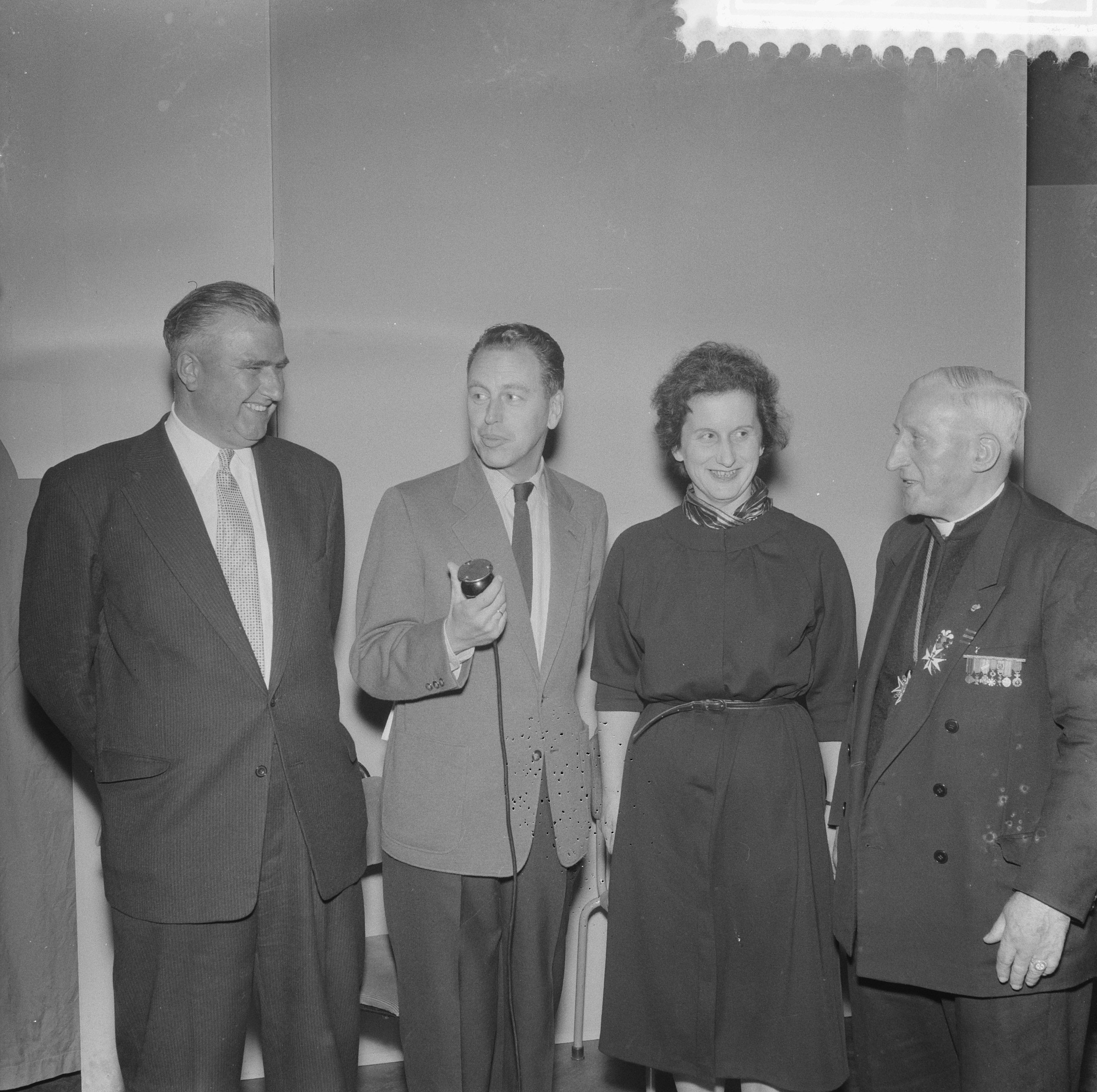
Hiltermann on the radio show "Dit is uw Leven" in 1958

In 1946, Hiltermann married the brother of her friend from Ravensbrück, Captain Pierre Souloumiac of the French Merchant Marine. The couple had three children: Anne-Geneviève, Irène and Alain Souloumiac. Pierre Souloumiac died on 3 February 1956. Hiltermann-Souloumiac published stories for children. She also became the correspondent in France for the Haagse Post, a Dutch weekly owned by her brother, G.B.J. Hiltermann. She was elected to the city council of Longjumeau. She also organized the Festival of Freedom in Balizy on the square where the chapel of a Commandry of the Knights Templar used to stand.

Hiltermann and her friends from Ravensbrück often gathered at her home. During one of their long discussions about the Algerian War of Independence, the women invented the new concept of "clochardisation" to describe the terrible marginalization that affects a large part of humanity. They sympathized with the Algerians who were fighting for their freedom.

== China ==
In 1960 Hiltermann-Souloumiac married a Dutch diplomat, Baron Albrecht van Aerssen. The couple moved to Hong Kong shortly after their marriage when van Aerssen was named Dutch Consul General there. In 1963 Hiltermann-Souloumiac started a school for the children of the small French colony in Hong Kong. The school occupied three rooms belonging to the Alliance Francaise in the Hang Seng Bank Building on Des Voeux Road. Most of the volunteer teachers came from the French consulate located in the same building. Commandant Houël, the Military Attaché, handled mathematics. The Reverend-Père Chagny taught literature. Pierre-Jean Rémy was the first history teacher. The school also offered correspondence courses through the CNTE in Vanves. Today 1,200 students study at the Lycée Victor Segalen Hong Kong, which became Asia's largest French high school.

Hiltermann-Souloumiac was a strong supporter of French recognition of Communist China. In 1963 her resistance connections allowed her to take part in discussions regarding the first French diplomats to be assigned to China and ways to end the Vietnam War. That same year, she developed a friendship with Nien Cheng, who represented the Shell Oil Company in China. The Red Guards brutalized Cheng's daughter Meiping to force her – unsuccessfully – to denounce her mother. In 1967 Hiltermann-Souloumiac petitioned Mao Zedong to release Cheng from prison. In the 1980s, after Cheng had immigrated to Canada and subsequently the US, Hiltermann-Souloumiac encouraged her to write about her experiences, which she said reminded her of her own experiences in Ravensbrück. Cheng published Life and Death in Shanghai in 1987.

== Latter years ==
In 1964 Hiltermann-Souloumiac divorced van Aerssen and moved back to France with her children. She embarked on a course of Chinese studies at Jussieu after educational reforms provoked by the events of 1968. She moved to Désaignes in the Ardèche in 1981 and died there in 2001.

== Tributes ==
- The municipal council of Montreuil-Juigné in Maine-et-Loire named a street after her in the Hameau de l’Espérance.
- In his book, Présence française à Hong Kong, du XIXe siècle à aujourd'hui, François Drémeaux acknowledge the prominent role played by Suzanne Hiltermann in the foundation of the Lycée Français de Hong Kong.
