= Herman Laatsman =

Dutch diplomat

Johan Herman Laatsman de Bailleul
- Born: September 14, 1903; Ghent
- Died: May 28, 1976; The Hague
- Other names: "Felix II", "M. Bekking"
- Occupation: Dutch Consular Official
- Known for: Resistance to the Nazis
- Movement: Dutch-Paris Escape Line
- Honours: Ridder van Orde de Oranje-Nassau; Legion d'Honneur, Medal of Freedom

Johan Herman Laatsman de Bailleul (September 14, 1903 – May 28, 1976) was a Dutch diplomat with a distinguished record for Resistance during World War II. For his contributions to the Allied cause, particularly as a member of the Dutch-Paris Escape Line, Laatsman was named a Ridder van Orde de Oranje-Nassau, a Commandeur de la Legion d’Honneur, merite international pour courage et devouément, and awarded the U.S. Medal of Freedom with Silver Palm. The citation for the Medal of Freedom mentions that he embarked on a “self-imposed mission with outstanding success” and enabled the escape of at least 112 Allied aviators.

== Self-imposed mission ==
Herman Laatsman took a position as a civil servant at the Dutch Consulate in Paris in September 1939. He began his resistance career almost as soon as the Nazis occupied Paris in May 1940. Laatsman travelled to the Netherlands illegally, disguised as a dishwasher on an international train, in order to bring money to France to pay the pensions and benefits due to Dutch citizens in France. Laatsman also helped Dutchmen who had been sent to build submarines at French ports to escape the forced labor and return home. In 1941 he belonged to a short-lived French escape line led by Olivier Giran that evacuated Jews and young men to Switzerland.

Laatsman was also involved in clandestine intelligence work with Major Baron Jacob KJ Brantsen, liaison officer between intelligence services of the Dutch and French armies at the Dutch Embassy in Paris. In addition, he had an intelligence connection inside the German Embassy in the person of Karl-Heinz Gerstner who provided confidential information and true-false papers through a Dutch student at the Sorbonne, Suzanne Hiltermann.

At the beginning of the Occupation of France, the Germans closed the Dutch Embassy in Paris but allowed it to continue some functions as the Dutch Section of the Swedish Embassy. In October 1942, however, they closed the Dutch section and ordered all staff to return to the Netherlands. Laatsman, his wife Joseffa "Rosetta" Bekking, their daughter and his son from his first marriage did not report to the train station. Instead, they went underground in St-Nom-la-Breteche. He continued to commute to Paris every day and to work for the resistance. He kept his flat 11 rue Schoelcher at Paris XVIe and used it to hide refugees. He took the train every day to Paris to continue and brought funds from the Netherlands to finance Dutch people residing in Paris.

== Dutch-Paris ==
In November 1943, Jean Weidner came to Paris to find Dutch resisters to join the Dutch-Paris escape line. He concluded that Laatsman was the most careful and most effective Dutch resister in the city. Weidner arranged to meet with Laatsman through Brantsen and Weidner’s own sister Gabrielle at the Place d’Italie in Paris on November 3, 1943. Weidner took Laatsman on an illegal journey to Switzerland later that month so that Laatsman could discuss joining Dutch-Paris with the Dutch ambassador in Bern.

Laatsman served as the chief of the Paris station on Dutch-Paris. He and his colleagues – including Suzanne Hiltermann, Jean Michel Caubo, Brother Rufus Tourné, Fernande Goetschel, Lucie Comiti and Leo Mincowski – specialized in helping downed Allied aviators as they came through Paris on their way south to Spain and then to England. They worked with a French resistance group led by Miguel Duchanel to find aviators hiding in the Paris area and to get false documents and other necessities for their journey. Other resistance groups who had joined Dutch-Paris in the city focused on helping Engelandvaarders and civilian refugees (mostly Jews). Laatsman and his colleagues hid aviators in and around Paris, including the laboratories of the École Normale Supérieure, farms near Gazeran and his own Paris flat at 11 rue Schoelcher. The following American and British airmen were among those helped by Laatsman and Dutch-Paris:

- Sherman, Howard N°742098
- Miller, W-J., N°33365620
- Horton, Jack, Lt. SW0672358
- Miller, Karl, Lt. 801163044
- Downe, Charles, Lt. 0678624
- Grubb, Ernest, F/O 120800
- Tracy, James, Sgt 31128008
- Hicks, Chaucy, Lt. 0735197
- Trnobransky, Jan (RAF).

== Arrest and deportation ==
Laatsman was arrested early in the morning of February 26, 1944, as part of a coordinated raid on all Dutch-Paris addresses involved in the aviator escape line in Paris. The German forces that surrounded his hiding place expected to find aviators hiding there, but did not. They also arrested his 14 year-old son, Johan Herman Laatsman Junior. The boy was forced to watch his father being tortured, but did not answer any questions. A Dutch lawyer in Paris negotiated the boy’s release from prison on condition that he return to his mother in Amsterdam. He did so, but disappeared from the city in March 1945. He was never found. Rosetta Laatsman and her daughter were not arrested because they were staying at a separate hiding place.

Laatsman himself was designated as a “Nacht und Nebel” prisoner, meaning that he was held incommunicado. He was deported on August 15, 1944. It took 5 days in overcrowded and overheated cattle cars full of political prisoners and 168 Allied airmen to arrive at Buchenwald concentration camp. On October 28, 1944, Laatsman was transferred to Mittelbau-Dora concentration camp, where he organized other prisoners to sabotage the V-1 and V-2 rockets they were building as slave labor. He survived a death march to Bergen-Belsen concentration camp in the final weeks of the war. British troops liberated him on April 15, 1945.

== Post war ==
After the war, Laatsman resumed his career in the Dutch diplomatic corps. Distraught over the disappearance of his son and suffering from post traumatic stress disorder, Laatsman made baseless accusations against some of his former resistance colleagues. When he refused to withdraw the accusations in the face of the evidence, he was transferred to the Dutch embassy in Brussels in 1946. From there he was transferred to Spain. The family continued to look for JH Laatsman Jr through the 1960s, without success.

== Sources ==
- Megan Koreman, The Escape Line: How the Ordinary Heroes of Dutch-Paris Resisted the Nazi Occupation of Western Europe, New York: Oxford University Press, 2018.
- Megan Koreman, Gewone helden: de Dutch-Paris ontsnappingslijn, Amsterdam: Uitgerverij Boom, 2016.
- Herbert Ford, Flee the Captor, Nashville TN: Southern Publishing Association, 1966.
- Sierk Plantinga, "Principieel pragmatisch: De Nederlandse vertegenwoordinging in Parijs, 1940-1944" in Instrumenten van buitenlandse politiek: Achtergronden en praktijk van de Nederlandse diplomate, ed. Bob de Graaff and Duco Hellema. Amsterdam: Uitgeverij Boom, 2007. 1-28.
- Karl-Heinz Gerstner, Sachlich, kritisch, un optimistisch: Eine sonntägliche Lebensbetrachtung, Berlin: Edition Ost, 1999.
