= Edmond Chait =

WWII Belgian resistance leader (1912–1975)

Edmond "Moen" Chait
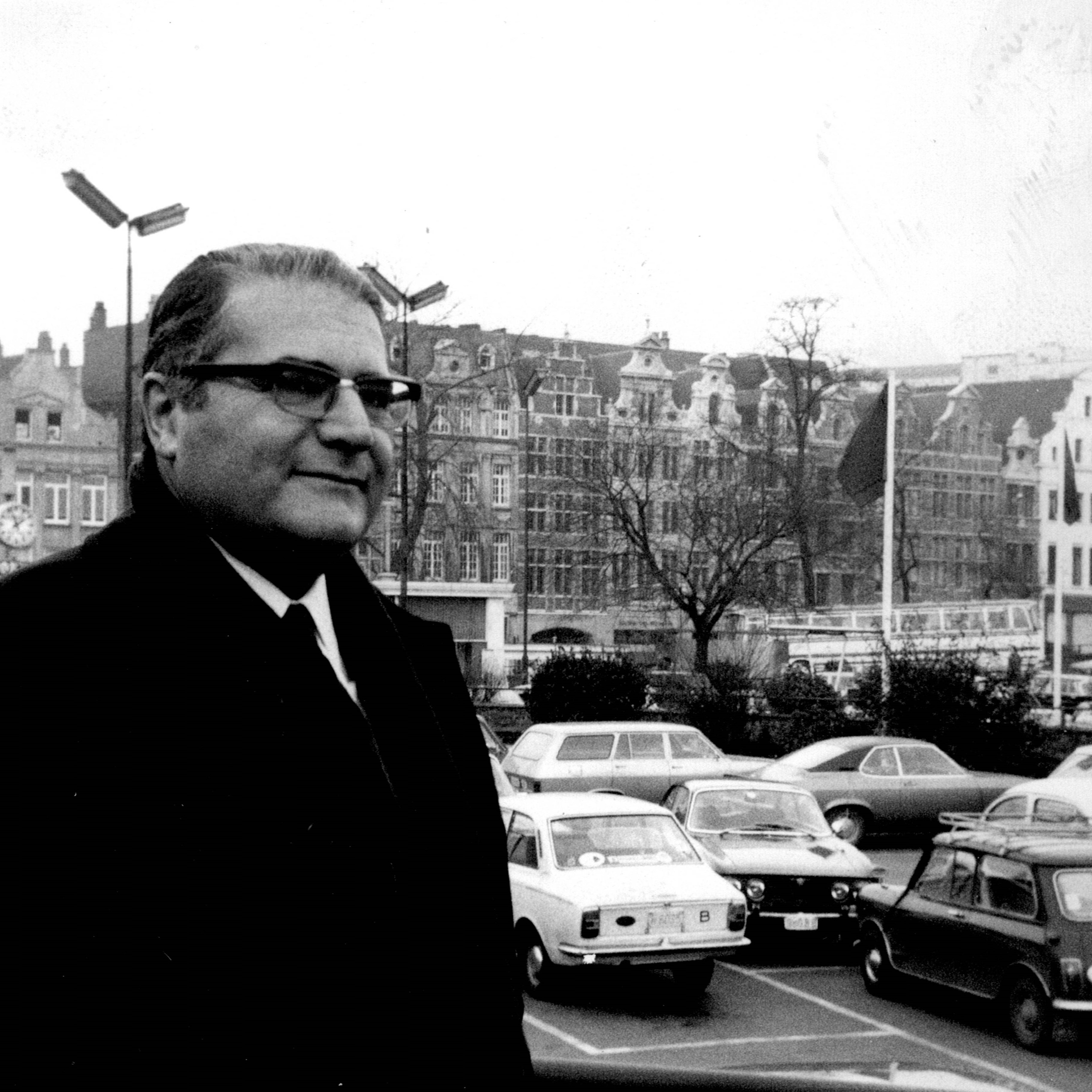
- Edmond Chait in 1973
- Born: 1912; Bourgerhout, Belgium
- Died: February 8, 1975 (aged 62–63); Rotterdam, Netherlands
- Other names: Moen
- Years active: 1942-1945
- Known for: Co-leader of Dutch-Paris Escape Line
- Notable work: rescued Jews, resisters, forced labor draft evaders and downed Allied airmen during WWII

Edmond Solomon "Moen" Chait (1912-1975) was a resistance leader of the Dutch-Paris Escape Line during the Second World War. Himself a Jew, Chait began his resistance career by helping other Jews to hide in the city of Antwerp, Belgium, as a member of the illegal Comité de Défense des Juifs (Committee for the Defense of Jews, CDJ). In mid-1942 he relocated to the city of Lyon, France, where he volunteered to lead Jewish refugees to neutral Switzerland. A year later in 1943, that escape line over the Swiss border expanded to reach from the Netherlands to Spain and Switzerland, going through Brussels, Paris, Lyon and Toulouse. Chait acted as one of the three leaders of the line, along with Jean Weidner and Jacques Rens. Chait took on the most dangerous missions such as carrying large amounts of cash across borders or escorting Jewish children to safety. He also arranged the escapes of prominent Dutch resisters, civilians wanting to join the Allies in England and downed Allied aviators.

== Early life ==
Edmond Solomon Chait was born in Antwerp, Belgium, to Franciska (Fanni) Schwartz and Itzak David Chait on September 10, 1912. Because of the severe food shortages in Belgium during the First World War, his parents passed him to his Dutch grandparents through the barbed wire fence on the Dutch border so that he would have enough to eat in the neutral Netherlands. As a young man he joined his father's timber import and export firm.

== World War II ==
Chait joined the resistance in Antwerp, Belgium, early in the war. He worked with the illegal Committee for the Defense of Jews, CDJ by taking material necessities such as false documents, cash and food to Jews in hiding.

In early 1942, Chait's mother and sisters were arrested in a round-up of Jews in Antwerp. They later died in deportation. In order to escape being deported themselves, Chait and his half-brother, the economist Bernhard Chait, made the illegal journey to the unoccupied zone of France, known as Vichy France. Their uncle arranged false Dutch identity cards that allowed them to get residence permits in Lyon, France. Despite these legitimate papers, Edmond was arrested on the street in a round-up of foreigners in August 1942. He spent several weeks in prison until the Dutch consul in Lyon, Maurice Jacquet, secured his release on the grounds that Chait's false papers identified him as a Dutch citizen.

After Chait's release, he volunteered as a translator at the Dutch consulate to help other Dutch Jews who had made the illegal journey to Lyon to avoid deportation. Consul Jacquet introduced him to a Dutch businessman working in the city named Jean Weidner. Weidner and his French wife, Elisabeth Cartier, had recently built an escape line to smuggle Jews from Lyon, France, to Geneva, in neutral Switzerland, through the restricted zone in Haute-Savoie, France. At Weidner's invitation, Chait joined the escape line as a courier and guide. He used several aliases, most often “Moen”, a name he continued to use after the war.

In spring 1943 one of Chait's resistance colleagues from the CDJ in Belgium, Benno Nijkerk, appeared in Lyon. As the treasurer of the CDJ in Brussels, Nijkerk was trying to get to Switzerland to ask international Jewish organizations for money to support the CDJ's rescue efforts. Weidner and Chait smuggled him into Switzerland. Chait also agreed to be a regular courier of cash and documents for the CDJ between Brussels and the Swiss border. On one such trip across occupied France and Belgium he carried a list of the names and addresses of Jewish children hiding in and around Brussels for safekeeping in Switzerland. Chait also escorted a Jewish girl from Brussels to Annecy, near the Swiss border, as a test case for a project to take 200 Jewish children to Switzerland. Chait left the girl in Annecy, Haute-Savoie, France, rather than risk crossing the border because the hiding place in Annecy was so good. She survived the war.

In the late summer of 1943, Weidner and Chait expanded the escape line to reach as far north as the occupied Netherlands and as far south as Spain. Weidner, Chait and another Belgian refugee named Jacques Rens acted as leaders of this expanded network, known as Dutch-Paris. They established bases for the escape line in Brussels, Paris and Toulouse by joining forces with local resisters who were already doing rescue work in those cities. In Belgium they worked with Chait's contact Benno Nijkerk, who was a leader of both the CDJ there and a Dutch rescue group called the Comité tot steun voor Nederlandsche oorlogsschlachtoffers in België (Committee for the Support of Dutch War Victims in Belgium).

Dutch-Paris helped anyone who needed help to escape from the Nazis. This included Jews, civilians evading the forced labor draft, civilians who wanted to join the Allies, known as Engelandvaarders, downed Allied airmen and resisters. They supported Jews hiding in occupied France and Belgium. They also smuggled fugitives into neutral Switzerland or into neutral Spain.

Weidner was the official “chef du réseau”, but Chait had as much authority to make decisions on the spot and travelled as much as Weidner or Rens. He spent the next year, until after the liberation of Belgium, constantly circulating through occupied France and Belgium on Dutch-Paris business. He carried microfilms for the Dutch Resistance's intelligence line, known as the Swiss Way, as well as documents for a number of other resistance groups and personal letters for individuals. He also carried large amounts of cash across borders. He did not carry a gun.

Chait also guided civilians and Allied aviators on all or part of their journeys to Switzerland or Spain. He took responsibility for fugitives of particular interest to the occupation authorities such as Bram van der Stok and Gerrit Jan van Heuven Goedhart. He also oversaw the escape line's work in Toulouse and the Pyrenees to get Allied aviators into Spain, including negotiating with local guides and finding hiding places when snow temporarily closed the passes in the mountains. Because he knew so much and carried such incriminating documents, Chait created his own network of safe houses and routes that was separate from those used for the fugitives. For example, he crossed the Franco-Belgian border in the town of Quiévrain by sidling along the outside of a foot bridge filled with barbed wire. Chait demonstrated this crossing in a 1967 TV documentary, Weg naar de vrijheid, meer dan 1080.

This separate web of safehouses allowed Chait to avoid arrest when the German authorities started rounding up many Dutch-Paris resisters who worked on the aviator escape line in February 1944. The arrests continued until June 1944, during which time Chait worked to restructure the line so that Dutch-Paris could continue its rescue work. He also helped some of his colleagues to get away from prisons and detention camps. After Weidner and Rens escaped from the Milice (French paramilitary collaborators) prison in Toulouse in May 1944, for example, Chait orchestrated their disappearance from the city and evasion of the police manhunt. He also arranged to ransom three Dutch Jews out of the Vichy internment camp of Noé in July 1944.

== Post-war ==
Chait's illegal rescue work ended when the Liberation of Belgium in September 1944 made Dutch-Paris unnecessary. From late 1944 until mid-1946, he worked with Weidner in the temporary “Netherlands Security Service” based in Paris. The service had the authority to uncover Dutch collaborators hiding in Belgium and France and to find and assist Dutch resisters in those countries. Chait used those resources to investigate the arrests within Dutch-Paris and to help returning resisters. In recognition of his actions to help fugitives such as Jews and downed Allied aviators escape from the Nazis, Chait was awarded the Dutch Ridder in de Orde van Oranje-Nassau; the Belgian Chevalier de l'Ordre de Leopold II avec Palme, Croix de Guerre 1940 and Medaille de la Résistance and the American Medal of Freedom.

In 1947, Chait returned to the family business of importing and exporting timber. On February 8, 1975, Chait died. He was buried in the Jewish cemetery in Rotterdam by his colleagues from the Resistance and their children.
