= Andrée Geulen =

Belgian teacher and resistance member (1921–2022)

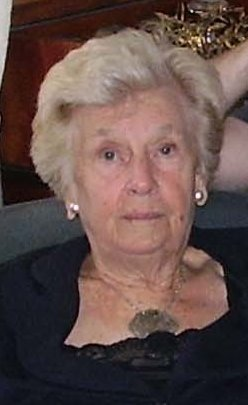
- Geulen, pictured in 2010
- Born: 6 September 1921; Schaerbeek, Belgium
- Died: 31 May 2022 (aged 100); Ixelles, Brussels, Belgium
- Occupation: Teacher
- Known for: Involvement with the Committee for the Defence of Jews during the Holocaust in Belgium

Andrée Geulen-Herscovici (6 September 1921 – 31 May 2022) was a Belgian teacher and member of the resistance during the German occupation of Belgium during World War II. After becoming aware of the persecution of Belgian Jews through her employment, she became involved in the Committee for the Defence of Jews (Comité de Défense des Juifs, or CDJ; Joods Verdedigingscomité, JVC) in 1943 and actively assisted with the organisation and protection of "hidden children" amid the Holocaust in Belgium. In the aftermath of the war, she was recognised as Righteous among the Nations by the Israeli institute Yad Vashem and received several other honours in Belgium and Israel.

== Biography ==
=== Career and resistance activities ===
Andrée Geulen was born in Schaerbeek, a suburb of Brussels, on 6 September 1921 into a liberal family of the urban bourgeoisie. After the German invasion of Belgium in May 1940, the country was placed under military occupation and Geulen became a schoolteacher and received a job in a primary school in central Brussels in 1942. She became aware of the escalating persecution of Jews through witnessing the introduction of the compulsory yellow badge used to identify Jews in public among the pupils in her class.

Through an introduction by Ida Sterno, another teacher in the same school, Geulen became involved with the small Committee for the Defence of Jews (Comité de Défense des Juifs, or CDJ; Joods Verdedigingscomité, JVC) in the spring of 1943 and became one of its few non-Jewish members. Her role was to contact Jewish families in Brussels and to persuade them to give up their children to the care of CDJ/JVC who would place them as "hidden children" in the care of Catholic families, schools, and religious institutions under false identities. Geulen was among a number of women members in its "Children" section.

Geulen taught and lived at the Athénée royal Isabelle Gatti de Gamond, a boarding school in the Brussels suburb of Woluwe-Saint-Pierre, whose headmistress, Odile Ovart-Henri, had already agreed to host 12 hidden children at the school. The school on the Rue André Fauchille was raided by the German authorities on Pentecost in May 1943 and some of the children were detained. Geulen herself was interrogated, but escaped to warn some of the Jewish pupils who had not been at the school at the time. Ovart and her husband Remy were both deported to a concentration camp, and did not survive the war. In the aftermath of the raid, Geulen went into hiding with Sterno and assumed a false identity, as Claude Fournier. Sterno was arrested in May 1944. Geulen was personally involved in the arrangements made for 300 Jewish children whom she collected and accompanied to Catholic schools and monasteries. She remained active with the CDJ/JVC until the Liberation of Brussels in September 1944.

=== Postwar life and recognition ===
After the war, Geulen became involved with the Jewish community in Belgium and maintained contact with the children with whom she had come into contact. She was involved in trying to reunite the hidden children with surviving family members and became actively involved in the relief organisation Aid for Israelite Victims of the War (Aide aux Israélites Victimes de la Guerre, AIVG) which supported Jewish survivors of Nazi concentration camps in Belgium. She became involved in activism for pacifist and anti-racist causes. She married Charles Herscovici, a Jewish concentration camp survivor of Romanian origin, in 1948.

Geulen was recognized with the honorific Righteous Among the Nations in 1989. She was granted honorary Israeli citizenship in a ceremony at Yad Vashem in 2007, as part of the "Children Hidden in Belgium during the Shoah" International Conference. Upon accepting the honor, Geulen-Herscovici said, "What I did was merely my duty. Disobeying the laws of the time was just the normal thing to do." She received honorary citizenship of the municipality of Ixelles.

Geulen's 100th birthday on 6 September 2021 was covered in the press in Belgium. The same year, a creche in Brussels was renamed in her honour. She died on 31 May 2022 in Ixelles.

== See also ==
- Jeanne Daman, a Belgian teacher with a similar background active in protecting Jews during the Holocaust
