= Fela Perelman =

Fela Perelman

Fela Perelman (July 20, 1909 – September 17, 1991) was a writer, Zionist and Belgian resistance fighter. During the World War II she contributed to the rescue of hundreds of Jewish children.

== Early life and education ==
Fela (Félicie) Liwer was born in Bedzin, Poland. At age 19, she moved to Brussels to study history, also obtaining a degree in educational psychology at the ULB. She met Chaïm Perelman at the school and married him in 1935; they had one daughter. She obtained a PhD, with a thesis on the Belgium and Poland revolts of 1830. She was a member of the Jewish Students' Association at ULB. Prior to the war she was an assistant to Aryeh Leon Kubowitzki at the World Jewish Congress branch in Brussels:

== World War II ==
In 1940 when World War II broke out, her plans for a career in teaching and writing books was called into question. At the beginning of the German occupation of Belgium, she organised care parcels for Jewish prisoners of Fort Breendonk. In the autumn of 1942, she participated, with her husband, in the establishment of the Committee for the Defence of Jews (CDJ) alongside Hertz and Yvonne Jospa. While Chaïm Perelman took care of Jewish adults and the distribution of underground newspapers, Fela Perelman participated in the activities of the CDJ's youth section. She established four Jewish kindergartens in Brussels (including Nos Petits in Uccle.) In 1942, in collaboration with the National Children's Welfare Organization (ONE), when the roundups and deportations of Jews from Belgium began, she entrusted these children to the CDJ for their safety. The children were often hidden in Catholic families or institutions. Vincent Genin reported that after the war sometimes strong disputes developed with the CDJ, which was accused of wanting to take back all these children by force if necessary. The CDJ recruited many childcare workers, including Jeanne Daman, who was later recognized as a Righteous Among the Nations. Hundreds of Jewish children were saved from Nazi persecution thanks to these shelters. Faced with worsening repression and an increase in the number of roundups, Fela Perelman and Jeanne Daman developed a network to place Jewish women as domestic servants in families.

== Post-war ==
After the war, Fela Perelman, true to her Zionist convictions, concerned herself with the "survivors" who wished to emigrate to Palestine. "She used her intelligence and persuasive skills" to obtain genuine visas and forged passes, seeking out refugees to help them cross borders. She leveraged her persuasive abilities and the high-level contacts she had cultivated during and after the war to facilitate the departure of two ships carrying Jewish immigrants to Palestine, whose gates were still closed by the mandatory power. The Hachayal Haïvri, left Antwerp on July 14, 1947, and the Tel Chai, which departed from Sète in 1946, carrying orphans from Bergen-Belsen who transited through Belgium. A third ship, the Theodor Herzl, also departing from Sète, carrying over two thousand passengers, including 1500 people brought from Belgium by Fela Perelman, was stopped by British forces.

The Perelman house, on Rue de la Pêcherie, was a meeting place and transit point for Israeli diplomats, politicians, intellectuals and artists staying in Belgium. In 1947, she founded the Association of Friends of the Hebrew University with her husband. Later, she helped found Belgian Friends (Les Amis Belges), which has long remained the privileged intermediary for relations between Belgium and Israel. She was the driving force behind the creation of an Institute of European Studies within the Hebrew University, which was established a year after her death. She met personalities such as Ben-Gurion, Golda Meir and Teddy Kollek. Fela Perelman was also a talented writer. Her first manuscript unfortunately disappeared during the exodus of May 1940. She published Inside the Whale in 1948.

== Personal ==
Upon her husband's death, Fela Perelman donated her archives to the Free University of Brussels. She died on September 17, 1991 in Salt Lake City, where she had travelled to attend her granddaughter's wedding. Noémie Perelman Mattis, the couple's daughter, survived the war as a hidden child and became a psychologist. Mattis donated other archives of her parents to the United States Holocaust Memorial Museum.
