= Karl Ritter (diplomat) =

German diplomat (1883-1968)

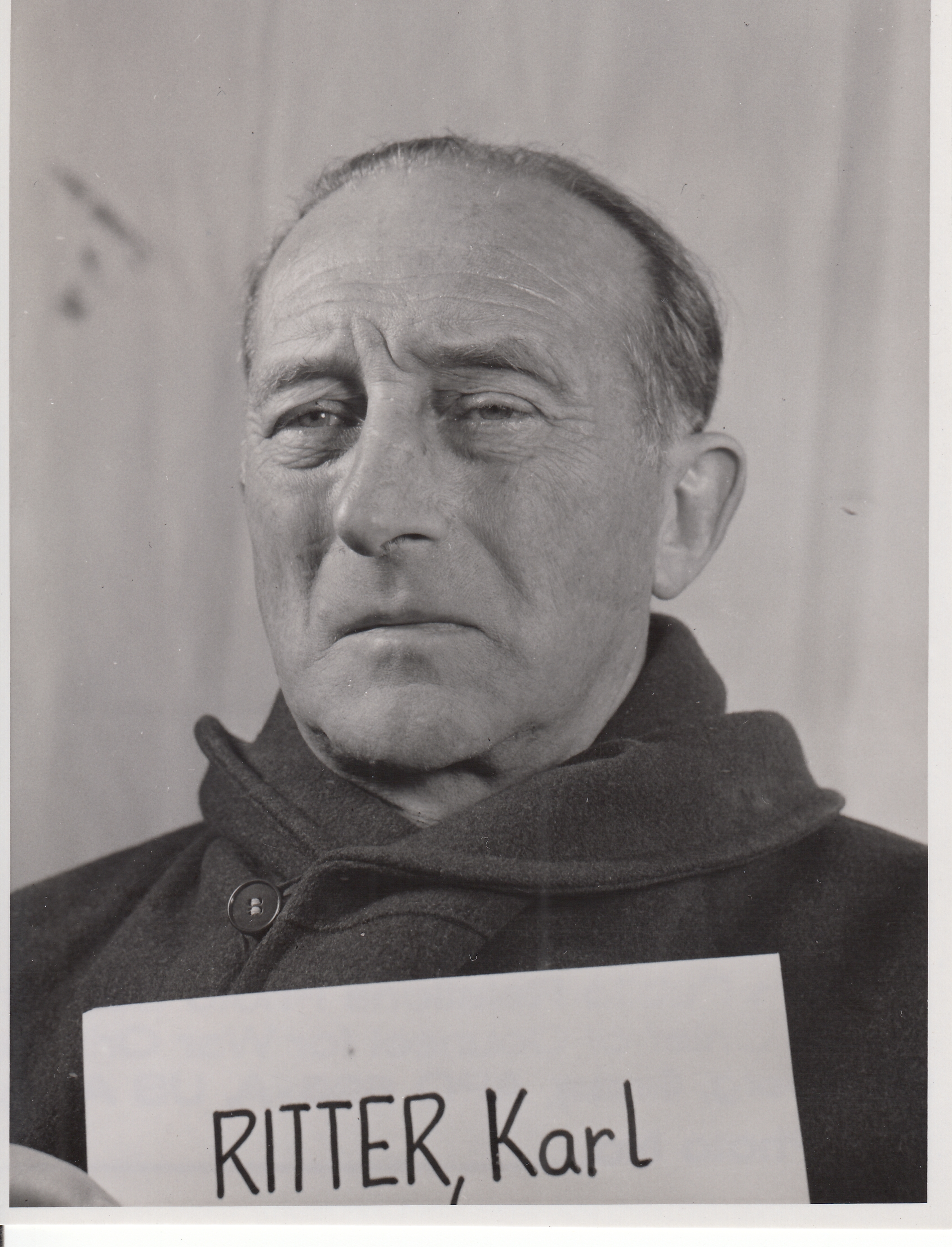
Karl Ritter

Karl Ritter (5 June 1883, Dörflas, Marktredwitz – 31 July 1968, Murnau am Staffelsee) was a German diplomat during the Third Reich and was convicted as a war criminal in the Ministries Trial. A member of the Nazi Party, he was ambassador to Brazil for two years, Special Envoy to the Munich Agreement, and a senior official in the Foreign Office during World War II.

== Career ==
Ritter graduated with a degree in law in 1905. In 1907 he was appointed to the Bavarian Civil Service. In 1911 he transferred to the colonial office, and in 1918 to the economics office before settling in 1922 in the Foreign Office, where he headed the sections for economics and reparations and finally the section for trading politics, where he played a significant role in the 1930–31 project to establish a German-Austrian Customs Union, which however came to nothing because of French opposition.

After the Nazis came to power, in 1937–38, he was first envoy and then ambassador to Rio de Janeiro. In Rio de Janeiro, he was declared persona non grata for demanding the Brazilian government ban anti-Nazi propaganda. He stated at his trial that he was forced to join the Nazi Party at this time. In 1938, he became chairman of Committee B of the International Commission for Cession of the Sudeten German Territory, during the preparations that led to the Munich Agreement.

When World War II began, Ritter was responsible for overseeing the economic war, with the rank of Ambassador, Special Duty. Until 1945, he was the liaison between the Ribbentrop Foreign Office and the OKW. Through Karl Schnurre, he worked on the 1939 negotiations with the Soviet Union that led to the economics part of the Nazi-Soviet non-aggression pact. One of his assistants in the Foreign Office was Fritz Kolbe, who beginning in 1943 smuggled classified documents from the Foreign Ministry-OKW correspondence to the American Legation in Bern, Switzerland, headed by Allen Dulles.

== Ministries Trial ==
At the war's end Ritter was arrested. At the Ministries Trial in 1947, he was arraigned on five counts. He was found innocent on the first, promotion of aggressive war. On the third count, crimes against humanity, specifically Jews, Catholics and other minorities, the judgement of the court was that Ritter was implicated in the deportation of Jews from Denmark, France, and Hungary, but that while he was under no illusions concerning the fate of Jews deported to the East, he "most likely had no immediate knowledge of the extent, methods, and associated circumstances of the measures to exterminate the Jews" and that "knowledge of the commission or existence of a crime suffices for a conviction only in those cases where a legal obligation exists to prevent or oppose an action." On the remaining counts he was found Not Guilty in the sense of the indictment, except for the second count, war crimes, specifically killing and mistreating participants in the war and prisoners of war, on which he was found guilty in two instances, firstly of Foreign Office complicity in an order not to prosecute cases of lynching of Allied flyers, regarding which the judgement of the court was that while Ritter was not the originator of this policy of murder, he was guilty of carrying it out; and secondly of the killing of escaped prisoners of war, because in his function within the Foreign Office he was obligated to inform the OKW that under the Geneva Convention of 1929 and Article 14 of the Hague Convention of 1907, the Swiss Embassy extends its protection to British prisoners of war, and he had instead been complicit in the sending of an untrue and misleading memorandum to the Swiss Embassy. One of the three judges, Leon W. Powers, dissented on both counts.

Ritter was sentenced to four years in prison, including time served beginning in 1945; he was released a month after sentencing, on 15 May 1949. He was represented by the defence lawyer Horst Pelckmann, who was replaced by Erich Schmidt-Leichner.

== Later life and family ==
Nothing is known of Ritter's life after his release except for attendance at the home of Winifred Wagner along with Edda Göring, Adolf von Thadden, Hans Severus Ziegler and others."

Ritter's illegitimate son Karl-Heinz Gerstner worked as a diplomat in Paris: it was subsequently demonstrated that he had on numerous occasions clandestinely assisted the French resistance; he became a communist and a journalist in East Germany.

== Publications ==
- Neu-Kamerun: Das von Frankreich an Deutschland im Abkommen vom 4. Nov. 1911 abgetretene Gebiet; Beschrieben auf Grund der bisher vorliegenden Mitteilungen. Veröffentlichungen des Reichskolonialamts 4. Jena: Fischer, 1912. OCLC 185552674. (in German) Online at Archive.org.

== Sources ==
- Ritter, Karl at German Federal Archives (in German)
