= Sonja Gerstner =

East German artist and writer

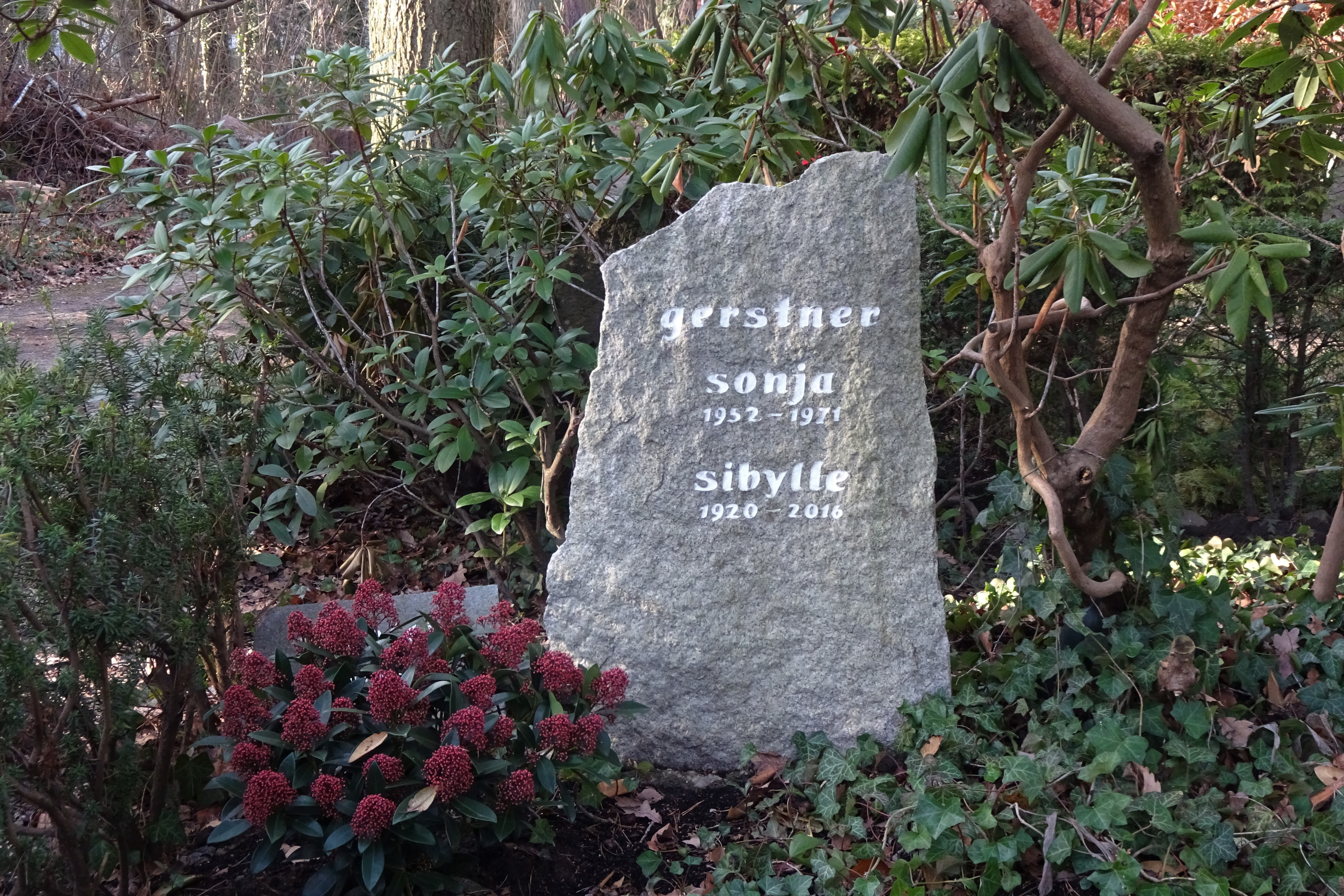
Her grave

Sonja Gerstner (13 June 1952 – 8 March 1971) was an East German artist and writer. She died young, after which publication by her mother of a book containing some of her poems, diary entries and other writings covering treatment she had received for her psychotic illness brought her to the attention of a wide audience.

== Life ==
Sonja Gerstner was born in Berlin into one of East Germany's elite families. Her father, Karl-Heinz Gerstner (1912-2005), was an economics journalist. Sibylle Boden-Gerstner (1920-2016), her mother, was one of East Germany's leading fashion journalists. Sonja was the younger of her parents' two daughters. The writer-controversialist Daniela Dahn is her elder sister.

When she was 17 Sonja displayed the first signs of psychotic illness. Several stays in closed psychiatric wards, where she was subjected to Insulin shock therapy and Electroconvulsive therapy intensified her sense of helplessness and spiritual isolation. Her attempts to make herself understood were mostly ignored. Her parents' desperate attempts on her behalf to find psychotherapeutic care were unsuccessful. Advised by doctors to cut herself off from her friends, Gerstner encountered growing difficulties at school and college. At the end of her third stay in the clinic she was released in December 1970 and moved into her own apartment, but experienced loneliness and an acute sense of inadequacy. She ended her life on 8 March 1971. The date has added significance because 8 March was celebrated in East Germany (and elsewhere) as International Women's Day.

After Sonja Gerstner died her mother, using the pseudonym Sibylle Muthesius, published "Flucht in die Wolken" ("Escape into the clouds"), a volume about her daughter that included full-colour reproductions of many of Sonja Gerstner's images. The book was published in 1981 and widely distributed. The next year it was published across the Inner German border in the west. Exhibitions of Sonja's writings and images followed.

== Works ==
Sonja Gerstner confided her hopes and anxieties to her diary. She also wrote poems, songs and letters. Increasingly, after her first psychotic episode, she expressed her artistic talent with surrealistic-expressionistic paintings and drawings.

"She was versatile, deeply sensitive and exceptionally creative. These characteristics entitled her to the beautiful hope that she would make her career as an artist. .... In picture, diaries, letters and poems the distraught young woman worked through her feelings and anxieties. Despite all her inner troubles, her love for life and then for humanity wins out." Wulf Skaun, Leipziger Volkszeitung, 2004

The largest collection of Sonja Gerstner's paintings and drawings is on permanent loan to the Prinzhorn collection at Heidelberg University. Her mother handed them over in 2007. Her diaries, letters and other writings are archived by the family.

== Psycho-historical importance ==
Sonja Gerstner's sad trajectory through psychosis treatment provided a basis for what may have been the first, and was certainly the most popular critical book on psychiatric provision in the German Democratic Republic. The situation in psychiatric institutions was set out in an authentic way, including descriptions of treatments involving Insulin shock therapy and Electroconvulsive therapy, and setting out with dramatic clarity the use of "isolation bunkers" and their impact on patients.

"Flucht in die Wolken", her mother's compilation of Sonja's work, quickly became popular in East Germany, and in the end was translated into eight languages. There was also a drama version produced in 1991 and a filmscript. The book's success can be attributed to the critical light it shone on therapeutic practice, the sensitive presentation of psychotic illness and the headlong assault on the taboo in place across the medical profession against applying the theories of Sigmund Freud and Carl Gustav Jung to diagnoses of mental illnesses. After the book appeared in West Germany a reviewer there praised the book for enabling the reader to recognise that misery in the psychiatric wards was a significant phenomenon as much in the east as in the west.
