= Daniela Dahn =

German writer, journalist and essayist

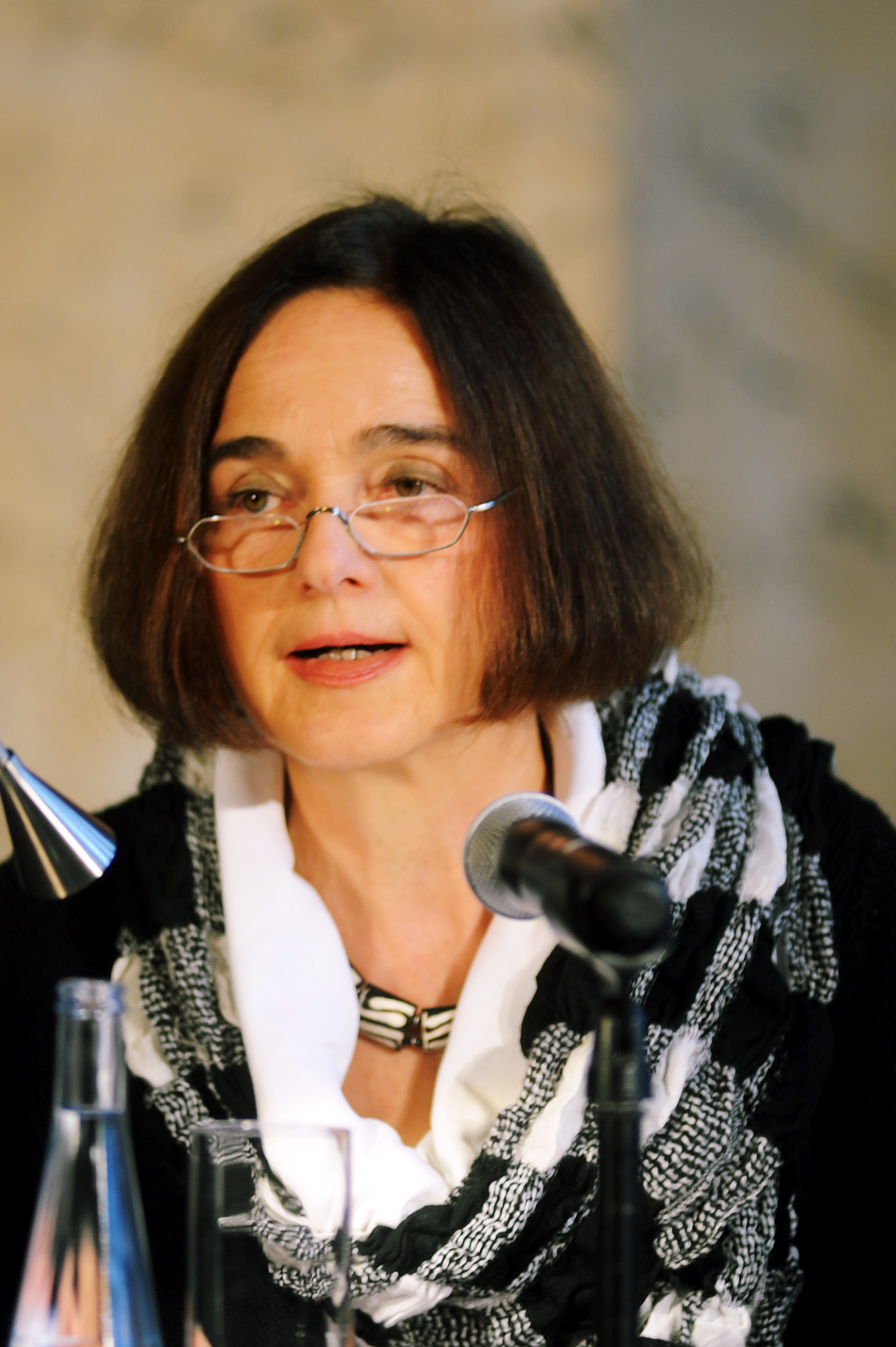
- Daniela Dahn in 2012
- Born: 9 October 1949 (age 76); German Democratic Republic
- Awards: Ludwig Börne Prize (Ludwig-Börne-Preis), 2004, Louise Schroeder Medal (Louise-Schroeder-Medaille), 2002, Kurt Tucholsky Prize (Tucholsky-Preis), 1999, Fontane Prize (Fontane-Preis), 1988

Daniela Dahn (born 9 October 1949) is a German writer, journalist and essayist. Since the reunification of Germany in 1990, Dahn has been an outspoken critic of the reunification process. Her highly personal style of writing, and her strident political opinions, have stirred controversy within Germany, but Dahn, who considered herself a dissident within East Germany before 1989, advocates for a critical journalism that continues the democratic tradition of challenging the government and policies of reunified Germany.

== Biography ==
Dahn is the daughter of the journalist Karl-Heinz Gerstner and fashion journalist Sibylle Gerstner, founder of the East German fashion magazine "Sibylle", and the older sister of Sonja Gerstner, who famously documented her own mental illness and the professional treatment she received. Dahn was born in Berlin just two days after the founding of the East German state. Dahn was brought up in Kleinmachnow, Brandenburg in what was then East Germany.

Daniela Dahn studied journalism in Leipzig and then worked as a television journalist, editing for GDR Television, before turning to freelance writing in 1981. In 1989 Dahn became one of the founders of the GDR opposition group Democratic Awakening. She later withdrew from it.

The Party of Democratic Socialism controversially introduced Dahn as one of their two candidates for the office of Constitutional Court judge in Brandenburg, in 1998. Her nomination was challenged by the Social Democratic Party of Germany and her candidacy was retracted at the last moment, after heated debate among the parties of the Brandenburg state parliament.

Dahn serves on the Executive Board of the writers' association PEN and lectures internationally. Dahn is also on the Advisory Board of the Humanist Union, and has held the post of Writer in Residence at Sunderland University in the UK. In addition, Dahn is co-editor of the weekly newspaper der Fritag. Her husband Jochen Laabs was from 1999 to 2001 Vice-President of PEN Center in Germany.

Along with Christa Wolf, with whom she has collaborated in the past, Dahn was seen as a possible choice by Die Linke as their candidate for President of Germany in the 2009 presidential election. Peter Sodann was eventually chosen instead.

== Controversy ==
In February 2023, Dahn was among the initial signers of a petition calling for an end to military support to Ukraine in the wake of the 2022 Russian invasion of Ukraine.

== Works ==
- Prenzlauer Berg-Tour. Mitteldeutscher Verlag Halle/Leipzig 1987, ISBN 3-354-00139-9
- Wir bleiben hier oder Wem gehört der Osten. Pol. Sachbuch, Reinbek 1994, ISBN 3-499-13423-3
- Westwärts und nicht vergessen. Vom Unbehagen in der Einheit, Essay. Berlin 1996, ISBN 3-499-60341-1
- Vertreibung ins Paradies. Unzeitgemäße Texte zur Zeit, Essays. Reinbek 1998, ISBN 3-499-22379-1
- In guter Verfassung. Wieviel Kritik braucht die Demokratie?, Essay u. Dokum., Reinbek 1999, ISBN 3-499-22709-6
- Wenn und Aber. Anstiftungen zum Widerspruch. Essays. Reinbek 2002, ISBN 3-499-61458-8
- Demokratischer Abbruch, Von Trümmern und Tabus, Essays, Reinbek 2005, ISBN 3-499-61973-3
- Wehe dem Sieger! Ohne Osten kein Westen, Rowohlt, 2009, ISBN 978-3-498-01329-5

== Awards ==
- Ludwig Börne Prize (Ludwig-Börne-Preis), 2004
- Louise Schroeder Medal (Louise-Schroeder-Medaille), 2002
- Kurt Tucholsky Prize (Tucholsky-Preis), 1999
- Fontane Prize (Fontane-Preis), 1988
- Berlin Prize (Berlin-Preis), 1987
