= Sibylle Boden-Gerstner =

German fashion designer and journalist

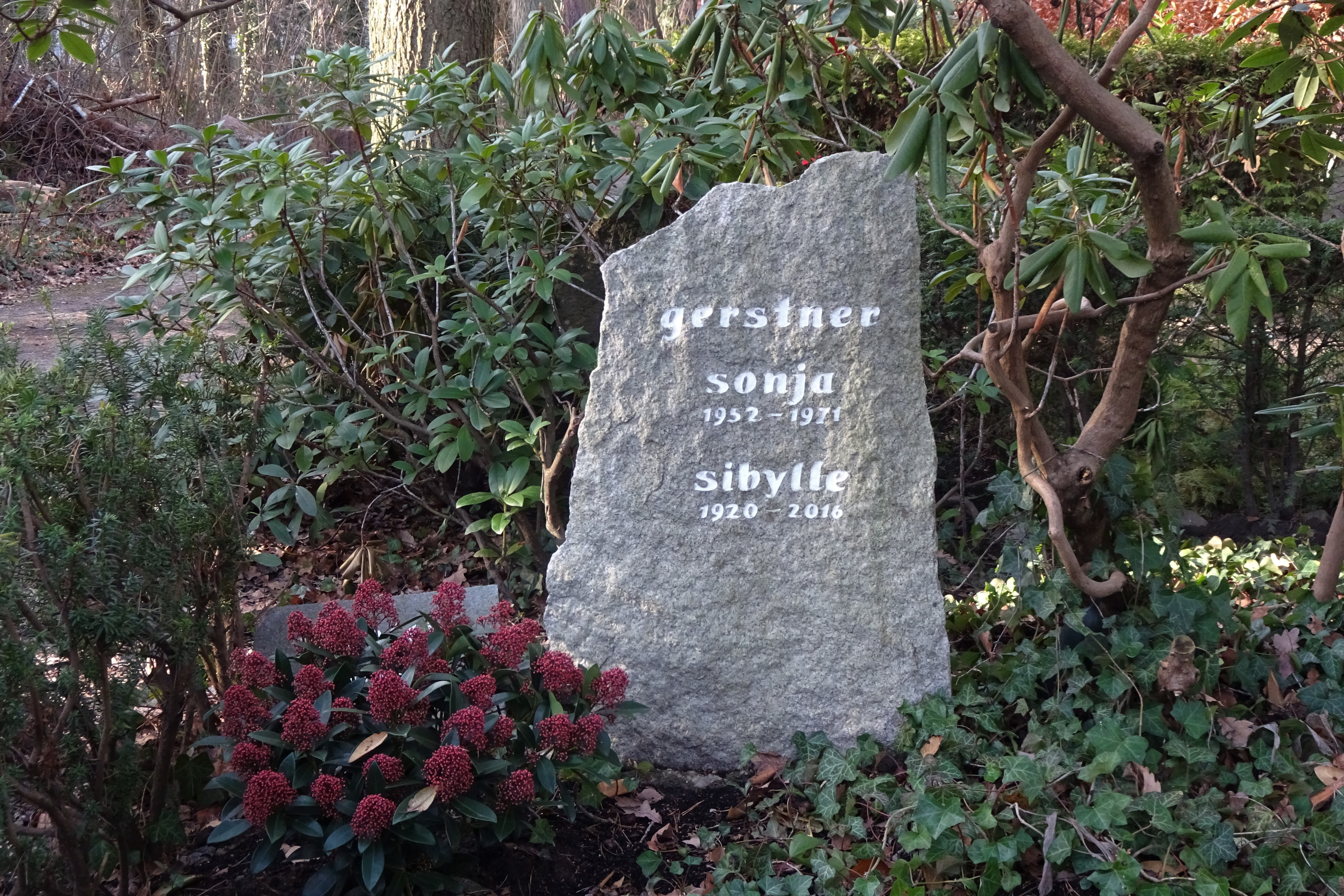
- Grave of Sibylle Boden-Gerstner with her daughter Sonja Gerstner in Kleinmachnow Cemetery
- Born: Sibylle Boden; 17 August 1920; Breslau, Silesia, Germany
- Died: 25 December 2016 (aged 96)
- Occupations: Costume designer Graphic artist Fashion journalist Magazine editor
- Spouse: Karl-Heinz Gerstner (1912–2005)
- Children: Daniela Dahn (writer & journalist; born 1949); Sonja Gerstner (1952–1971)

Sibylle Boden-Gerstner (17 August 1920 – 25 December 2016) was a German costume designer, artist and fashion writer. In 1956 she founded the East German arts and fashion magazine which bore her name, Sibylle, working with the publication as its editor in chief till 1961.

== Life ==
=== Early years ===
Sibylle Boden was born in Breslau (since 1945 known as Wroclaw) into a German-Jewish family. Her father was a furrier and merchant who probably later died in a Silesian prison during the Shoah. Her mother was a businesswoman. Her grandfather, Moritz Boden, was Jewish and his wife converted to Judaism for her husband's sake. In the 1930s this meant Sibylle Boden was classified as a "jüdischer Mischling" (sometimes translated, loosely, as "Jewish mongrel"). Between 1926 and 1936 she was educated first at a private school and then at the Realgymnasium (traditional secondary school) in Breslau. In 1936 she moved to Berlin where she studied at the Textiles and Fashion Academy. Her teachers included Maria May and Erna Hitzberger. She briefly attended the Berlin Arts Academy where she studied painting and illustration. However, the Nazi government came to power at the start of 1933. In 1936 it became impossible for Boden to progress with her studies due to her Jewish background. She was able briefly to pursue her studies at the Academy of "Arts and Crafts" in Vienna, where her studies focused on painting, graphic art and theatre costume design, until Austria was merged into an enlarged Nazi state in March 1938, and she left.

=== War years ===
Boden first met the government lawyer (and, later, journalist) Karl-Heinz Gerstner at a ski resort in the Giant Mountains in southern Silesia. War had broken out a few months earlier, but Gerstner was excused military service due to the effects of his childhood spinal paralysis. The couple fell in love and eventually married after the war, in 1945.

Gerstner had joined the Nazi Party in 1933. By 1945 it is apparent from his active support for the French Resistance and rescuing of Jewish families ahead of scheduled deportation that he was no longer a Nazi supporter, but in 1940 he was seen as a member of the Nazi establishment. The son of a diplomat, and already fluent in French, since July 1940 he had been working as a legal and economic assistant at the German embassy in Paris, and through his intervention Boden was able to escape, illegally, to Paris in autumn of 1940. In Paris she was able to resume her study of painting, now at the École nationale supérieure des Beaux-Arts, where her attendance is described in one source as "undercover". Nevertheless, when in 1942 she took part in an exhibition produced by the Beaux-Arts academy, two of her works won a first and a third prize.

She shared much of her life in Paris with Gerstner; together they attended Parisian Haute couture fashion shows, at which Boden-Gerstner was able to sketch the latest designs of fashion designers such as Christian Dior and Jacques Fath, sending her drawings to an agent in the Netherlands. She and Gerstner also visited socially the high-profile fashion designer Jacques Fath. In the summer of 1944 most German diplomats were recalled to Berlin. Boden returned with Gerstner, who was given a job in the capital with the Foreign Ministry. They participated in political actions against the Nazi régime in Berlin-Wilmersdorf.

=== After the war ===
War ended in May 1945. Under the terms of the London Protocol, signed in September 1944, the principal Allies of World War II had agreed to a postwar partition of Berlin between themselves into four separately administered zones of occupation; but directly after the war the entire city was occupied by Soviet forces. In the Wilmersdorf quarter of Berlin the Soviet commander appointed Gerstner deputy mayor. In May of that year, the couple were able, finally, to marry. Boden-Gerstner took a teaching job at a private fashion academy and contributed the fashion pages for a newspaper, also designing clothes. Shortly after this, an exhibition was held in the city under the title "Befreite Schwingen" (loosely: "Swing free") at which her paintings were exhibited alongside those of Carl Hofer, Max Pechstein and Gustav Seitz.

In 1946, British military police arrived in Wilmersdorf and arrested Gerstner, believing that his job in Paris meant that he must have been a senior Nazi official. The British handed him over to the Soviet forces. Boden-Gerstner was able to obtain statements from former resistance members in France attesting to his secret wartime work with the French Resistance and his contribution to saving Jewish families scheduled for deportation to the death camps. These documents were enough to secure Gerstner's release from the Soviet "special camp" at Berlin-Hohenschönhausen. In Gerstner's 1999 memoirs he referred to the evidence Boden-Gerstner gathered to secure his release, stating "I owe her my life" ("Ich verdanke ihr mein Leben").

=== Soviet occupation zone/German Democratic Republic ===
The couple's Wilmersdorf home was in the British occupation zone of Berlin, but they later moved to Zeuthen on the south eastern edge of the city, which was administered as part of the Soviet occupation zone till October 1949, when the entire Soviet zone was relaunched as the Soviet sponsored German Democratic Republic (East Germany).

Gerstner-Boden remained at the Berlin private fashion academy she had joined in 1945, serving as its head until 1949. After 1949 she concentrated on costume design, but also continued to produce paintings under her maiden name, Sibylle Boden. Although sources describe her costume design work as "free-lance", it is clear that in or around 1949 she was talent spotted by the DEFA, the East German national film company, working for them in collaboration with the film director Wolfgang Staudte. After 1951 she had a permanent contract for costume design work with the DEFA. She also undertook costume design work for East German television. In 1953 the family relocated again, moving to a house in the prestigious suburb of Kleinmachnow on the north eastern edge of Berlin.

In July 1956 she founded the arts and fashion magazine Sibylle and became its arts chief. Calling it by her own name was originally intended as a "test", but the name stuck. When it was decided that it needed an editor in chief, between 1958 and 1961 Gerstner-Boden took the position. She developed regular features such as "Wir sahen in Paris" ("What we saw in Paris") and "Sibylle fragt" ("Sibylle asks"). The magazine presented clothes, drapes and accessories. The managing director was required and permitted to travel frequently to destinations such as Paris, Milan, Prague, Warsaw and Moscow.

Sibylle was a large-format publication produced six times a year, with carefully composed minimalist covers. Fashion models were often seen against "abstract" backgrounds. Title fonts were simple. To some extent, the simplicity was born of economic necessity, but when she was interviewed in 2013 Boden-Gerstner was keen to point out the extent to which it anticipated future trends, describing the publication as a cross between The New Yorker and Vogue. It was not ashamed to flaunt uncompromising luxury, even to readers in a workers' and peasants' state. In this way it also expressed a kind of dissidence, or even stubbornness. Sibylle was a success, always sold out even when print runs peaked at 200,000 copies. In the end, the direction taken by the magazine was determined to be "too French for Socialism" ("zu französisch für den Sozialismus"), and in 1961 Boden-Gerstner had to resign. When she was later asked about this in an interview she said "The others were jealous, and probably wanted my job. The magazine continued to carry my stamp" ("Ach, die waren eifersüchtig und wollten wahrscheinlich meinen Posten. Das Magazin trug meine Handschrift und dabei blieb ich.").

After 1961 Boden-Gerstner returned to her work as a free-lance costume designer for the DEFA film studio and East German television. Some of the most successful films on which she worked included Wolf Among Wolves, subsequently a television series, and significant as the first East German movie also screened for West German audiences. Others were a "remake" of Little Man, What Now?, "Abschied vom Frieden" ("Leaving Peace behind") and The Fiancée. She also worked during this period as a simultaneous translator between German, French and English.

== Personal ==
Boden-Gerstner had two daughters: Daniela Dahn (born 1949), a writer, journalist and controversialist. She considered herself a dissident as a young woman in the German Democratic Republic, and continues to be an establishment critic of the unified Germany. Sonja Gerstner (1952–1971) was a writer and painter who first showed signs of psychosis when she was 16 and committed suicide three years later.

Published under the pseudonym Sibylle Muthesius, Boden-Gerstner's book, Flucht in die Wolken appeared in 1981 in East Germany. By 1992 it had reached seven editions. It first appeared in West Germany in 1982, complete with a substantial epilogue by Margarete Mitscherlich-Nielsen. The book provides a narrative of her daughter Sonja's illness, treatments and suicide.

== Death ==
Sibylle Boden-Gerstner died on 25 December 2016 at the age of 96.
