= MRAX =

Belgian non-profit organization

The MRAX (acronym of Mouvement contre le Racisme, l'Antisémitisme et la Xénophobie, "Movement Against Racism, Antisemitism, and Xenophobia") is a Belgian organization. It succeeded the Movement for the Fight against Racism, Anti-Semitism and for Peace (MRAP, Mouvement de lutte contre le Racisme, l'Antisémitisme et pour la Paix) in 1966, becoming a non-profit organization on October 7, 1975.

== Crisis ==
The changes of MRAX during the 2000s, the personality of its president, Radouane Bouhlal, and the orientation that the latter gave to the organization generated deep discomfort within the institution, from which departures, social movements and dismissals started and increased. Strong criticism also comes from outside, both from political circles and from associations. Radouane Bouhlal is accused of authoritarianism and opaque management.

== Missions ==
"The association aims to fight racism, anti-Semitism and xenophobia. It calls for union and action all those who intend to oppose discrimination, hatred, prejudices based on an alleged race, nationality, language, culture, national or ethnic origin, color, confession or philosophical convictions. It wants to make triumph the friendship and the peace between the people and to promote the equality and the brotherhood between human beings. It aims to defend the memory of the victims of racist persecution, committed in particular under Nazism".

The first president of MRAX, Yvonne Jospa, explained that the priorities of MRAX were to fight against all forms of exclusion, always analyzing the situation to understand the causes.

== Action Week Against Racism ==
The MRAX organizes the SACR in collaboration with other associations, both French-speaking and Dutch-speaking. A week rich in activities, competitions, information and discoveries. Each edition revolves around a predefined theme.
