= Isabelle Gatti de Gamond Royal Atheneum =

School in Brussels, Belgium

Coordinates: 50.85215°N 4.36057°E

Athénée royal Isabelle Gatti de Gamond
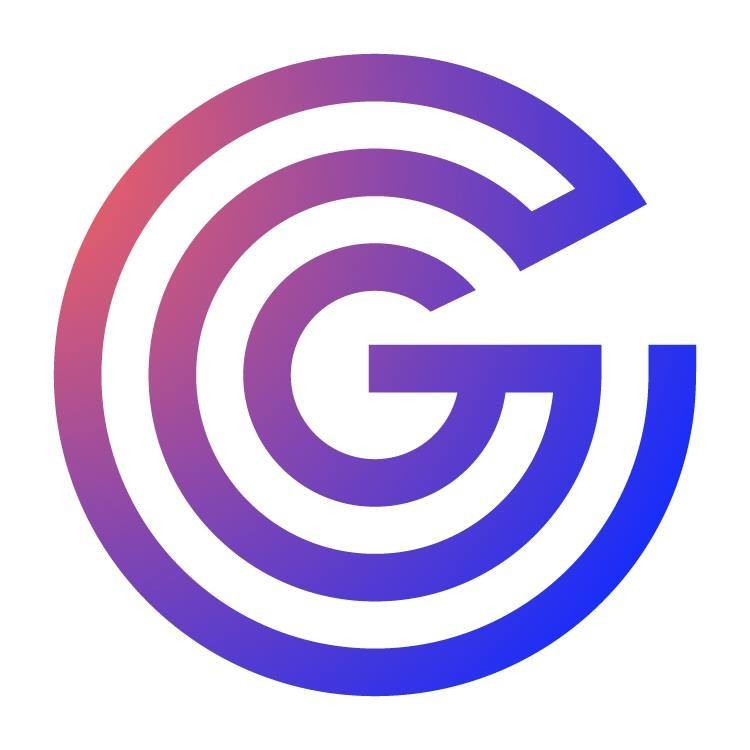
- 65 rue du Marais; Brussels-Capital Region; Brussels, 1000

Information
- School type: K-12 French-speaking public school
- Established: 1864
- Founder: Isabelle Gatti de Gamond
- Authority: Wallonie Bruxelles Enseignement (WBE).
- Principal: Bertrand Wilquet
- Teaching staff: 103 (2017)
- Grades: K-12
- Gender: Mixed-gender
- Enrollment: 1049 (2017)
- Language: French
- Area: 2
- Nickname: Gatti
- Alumni: Gatticien·nes

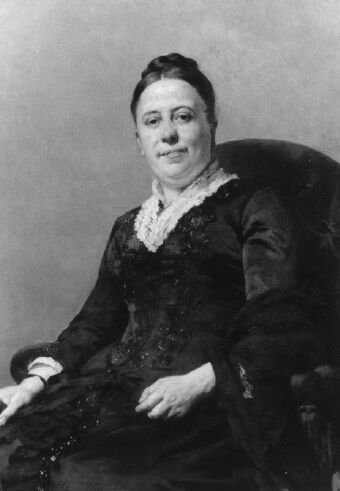
Alfred Cluysenaar's painting of Isabelle Gatti de Gamond, Brussels, 1889 (Musée d'histoire de la ville de Bruxelles)

The Isabelle Gatti de Gamond Royal Atheneum (French: Athénée royal Isabelle Gatti de Gamond) is a French-language K-12 school in Brussels, Belgium. When founded in 1864 by Isabelle Gatti de Gamond, the school was the first non-confessional school for girls in Belgium.

== History ==
Established on October 3, 1864, under the name Cours supérieur d'éducation pour jeunes filles, the school is the oldest public middle and high school for girls in Belgium.

The school extended its curriculum throughout the second half of the 19th century with the creation of a kindergarten (1879), a department of pedagogy providing educational training to future female schoolteachers (1880) and a university preparatory department (1894). It was named Lycée royal Gatti de Gamond in 1948 and adopted its current name with the implementation of mixed-sex education in 1976.

Since the closure of the Athénée royal de Bruxelles (fr) in 2002, the school is the only K–12 school in the WBE public education network located within Brussels' historic city centre.

== Education ==
The school, part of the Wallonie-Bruxelles Enseignement (WBE) public education network, offers both general and vocational education and is located on two campuses:

- Primary School (pre-k – grade 7) : 9 rue du Canon - 1000 Brussels
- Secondary school (grades 7-12) : 65 rue du Marais - 1000 Brussels

== Notable alumni ==
=== Former principals ===
Isabelle Gatti de Gamond (1864-1899), Cornélie Nourry (1899-1902), Lilla Monod (1902-1919), Germaine Collaer-Feytmans (1919-1926), Juliette Orban (1926), Juliette Daco-Wéry (1926-1944), Angèle Ramoisy (1944-1958), Hélène Andries-Leva (1958-1977), Betty Wéry-Hofman (1977-1978), René Pira (1978), Rose Delmez (1978-1979), Olga Bosschaert (1978-1980), Pierre Willemart (1980-1989), Andrée Depauw (1990), Jean-Pierre Goman (1990), Bernadette Genotte (1991-2004), Nicole Antoine (2004-2009); Hugues Thiry (2009-2010); André Charneux (2010-2013), Bertrand Wilquet (2014), Pascal Hallemans (2015-2017) and Bertrand Wilquet (since 2017).

=== Former teachers ===
- Henriette Dachsbeck, feminist.
- Andrée Geulen, 'Righteous Among the Nations'.
- Odile Henri (1892-1945) : former teacher and head of the boarding section, she was deported to the Bergen-Belsen concentration camp after having hidden Jewish children at the school boarding section.
- Anne Morelli, historian, professor at Université libre de Bruxelles
- Louise Popelin (1850-1937) : one of the three first female university students in Belgium (1880).
- Marie Popelin : first Belgian woman to receive a doctorate in law.

=== Former students ===
- Alain Berliner, film director
- Georgette Ciselet, Belgian senator
- Marie Closset, poet
- Martine Cornil, journalist
- Farid El Asri, anthropologist, professor at Université catholique de Louvain
- Alexis Goslain, actor, singer
- Marie Janson, first female Belgian senator
- Marthe de Kerchove de Denterghem, feminist, politician
- Helena Lemkovitch
- Lio, singer and actress
- Michel Ngonge, football player
- Blanche Rousseau (1875-1949), author
- Nathalie Uffner, actress and author
- Marguerite Van de Wiele, author
- Gabrielle Warnant, feminist, politician
- Mourade Zeguendi, actor

== See also ==
=== Further reading ===
- John Bartier, Lucien Cooremans, Un siècle d'enseignement féminin: le lycée royal Gatti de Gamond et sa fondatrice, Malvaux, Brussels,1964
- B. J. Baudart, Isabelle Gatti de Gamond et l'origine de l'enseignement secondaire des jeunes filles en Belgique, Castaigne, Brussels, 1949
- Pol Defosse, "Isabelle Gatti de Gamond", online at http://ligue-enseignement.be; accessed May 2017
- Eliane Gubin, Valérie Piette, Isabelle Gatti de Gamond, 1839-1905: La passion d'enseigner, Gief, ULB, Bruxelles, 2004
- Denise Karnaouch, "Féminisme et laïcité. 1848-1914", online at http://www.archivesdufeminisme.fr, December 2005; accessed May 2017
- Sharon Larson, "A New Model of Femininty: Marguerite Coppin, Decadent Fiction and Belgian Girls' Education", Dix Neuf, vol. 20, 2016
- Sylvie Lausberg, "Mémoire d'émail: Isabelle Gatti de Gamond (III). La franc-maçonne qui fit trembler la Belgique de Papa", Le Soir, 24 July 1998
- Anne Morelli, "Une école qui inspire... Le lycée Gatti de Gamond dans le roman", in Hervé Hasquin, Andrée Meyer, Libre pensée et pensée libre: combats et débats, Editions de l'Université libre de Bruxelles, Brussels, 1996, pp. 173–188
- Anne Morelli, "Isabelle Gatti de Gamond: socialiste et féministe", lecture delivered in Brussels town hall, 29 November 1989
- Valérie Piette, "Isabelle Gatti de Gamond ou l'égalité pour tous et toutes: de l'enseignement au socialisme et à la libre-pensée", lecture delivered in Brussels town hall, 3 October 2014
- Pierre Van den Dungen, "Parcours singuliers de femmes en lettres : Marie Closset, Blanche Rousseau et Marie Gaspar. Des cours d’éducation d’Isabelle Gatti de Gamond à quelques expériences éducatives buissonnières", Sextant, 13 (2000), pp. 189–209
- Kaat Wills, "Science, an Ally of Feminism? Isabelle Gatti de Gamond on Women and Science", Revue belge de philologie et d'histoire, 77 (1977)
- "Isabelle Gatti de Gamond et l'origine de l'enseignement secondaire des jeunes filles en Belgique", online at http://www.bibliomania.be [archive], consultation en mai 2017
