= Jeanne Daman =

Jeanne Daman

Jeanne Daman (1918–1986), a hero of the Belgian Resistance during World War II, was recognized by Yad Vashem as one of the Righteous Among the Nations.

== Biography ==
As one of the non-Jewish members of the Comité de Défense des Juifs in Brussels, Belgium, she helped rescue several thousand Jewish children from the Nazis by taking them to safe home environments such as non-Jewish families and Catholic religious institutions, where the children were given new names and identities. After the war she helped to find the children so they could be returned to their families, and helped care for children who had survived the concentration camps. Daman also took Jewish women to be maids in Belgian households, giving them false identity papers and ration cards, and attempting to keep them informed as to where their children were hiding.

She also helped coordinate attacks on collaborators so that they could be killed. After this she took on a new identity and worked as a social worker with Winter Help, a German welfare organization. Near the end of World War II she transported arms to Mouvement Royal Belge, and she also worked as an intelligence agent in the Brussels corps of the Belgian Partisans Army.

In 1946 she emigrated to the United States, where she fundraised for Israel through the United Jewish Appeal. In 1971 Yad Vashem recognized her as Righteous Among the Nations. In 1972 she was awarded the Medal of the Righteous People on behalf of Yad Vashem. In 1980 she was awarded the ‘Entr’aide’ [Mutual Aid] medal from the Belgian Jewish Committee 1940–45, under the patronage of the King of Belgium.

=== Her life and her accomplishments ===
Jeanne Daman received her teaching certificate at the beginning of the Second World War in Belgium. In 1942, Fela Perelman, who organized rescue efforts for Jewish children at the time, asked Daman if she would be willing to teach at the school "Nos Petits" (our little ones), a private Jewish kindergarten in Brussels, since the Jewish children were suddenly denied the right to attend public schools by the anti-Jewish measures put in place by the Nazi occupiers. Daman accepted the offer and soon began serving as Nos Petits’ headmistress. She accepted the offer straightaway in hopes of preventing the brutal treatment and discrimination against the Jewish community that had begun taking place. She started to actively take part in the rescue of all the Jewish children.

When she began teaching at Nos Petits, she witnessed the mass arrest of the Jews, as well as the inhumane treatment they were receiving. This changed her life; she discovered a new purpose. Each day, she found more and more children to be missing from school; they were either being rounded up along with their families or had been placed in orphanages. The parents of the children had approached the school for help and the only possible action to prevent further identification of the Jewish children by the Nazis was to close the school.

She began assisting the Jewish orphans by finding safe places for them to hide, and she did not lose touch with them. Often she herself would smuggle the children to the houses of the Belgian families willing to hide Jews during the war, thus putting her own life at risk. Daman saved approximately 2,000 children who were in danger of being deported, not to mention the many adults she rescued as well. For instance, Daman arranged for a network of women to work as maids in houses all across Belgium. She did so by providing them with false identity papers and ration cards. By the end of the war, she was active in several resistance movements.

==== Honors ====
In 1971 Yad Vashem recognized Jeanne Daman as Righteous Among the Nations, with a ceremony held in 1972. In 1980 she was awarded the ‘Entr’aide’ medal from the Belgian Jewish Committee 1940–45, under the patronage of the King of Belgium.

==== Life post-war ====
The war ended in Belgium in May 1945 and Daman worked to reunite the hidden Jewish children and orphans with their families. According to Daman, she saved Jews for “rational, moral and emotional reasons”. She also provided care to children who returned from the concentration camps.

In May 1946 she travelled to the US, worked for the United Jewish Appeal (UJA) and gave speeches about her wartime experiences and how much help the survivors needed. In 1949 she visited family and then friends and former students in Israel, returning to the US in September 1951. On the return trip she met her future husband. Aldo Scaglione (1925–2013) had been an Italian partisan during the war. Marrying in 1952 they settled in Berkeley, California, where Aldo taught at UC Berkeley. Jeanne continued her speaking engagements and, once they moved to Chapel Hill, North Carolina in 1968, she increased their frequency. She died in 1986.

== See also ==
- Andrée Geulen
