= Ida Sterno =

Jewish social worker

- Born: 1902; Bucharest
- Died: 14 May, 1964 (aged 61–62); Brussels, Belgium

Ida Sterno (1902-1964) was a Jewish social worker well known for her work with the Comité de Défense des Juifs (CDJ) in World War II.

== Early life ==
She was born in Bucharest, Romania in 1902. Sterno was Jewish. She immigrated to Belgium in 1914. She was a social worker for children during the Spanish Civil War.

== World War II work ==
At the beginning of the war, Sterno was hired for a social work position in Charleroi, Belgium. However, she was fired soon after because of her Jewish identity.

Sterno was the head of the CDJ's children placement section. She met Andree Geulen in the CDJ. The two were responsible for protecting Jewish school children from the Nazis in Brussels, Belgium. They relocated Jewish children using complicated codes to hide their identities. Sterno and Geulen shared an illegal residence in Brussels, in which Sterno kept records of the children and their hosts hidden under a rug. Sterno did her work under the pseudonym Madamoiselle Jeanne.

Ida was arrested by the Gestapo in May 1944 and imprisoned in Malines. She was tortured for months, but she never revealed the names of the relocated children. Sterno was finally freed when the Allies liberated Belgium in September 1944, but the months of torture left her health compromised.

== Post-war life and death ==
Both Sterno and Geulen reconnected through the years with many of the children they had rescued.

She died at the age of 62 on 14 May 1964 in Brussels, Belgium, of a heart attack.
