= University of Brussels =

University of Brussels may refer to several institutions in Brussels, Belgium:

== Current institutions ==
- Université libre de Bruxelles (ULB), a French-speaking university established as a separate entity in 1970
- Vrije Universiteit Brussel (VUB), a Dutch-speaking university established as a separate entity in 1970
- Saint-Louis University, Brussels (UCLouvain), a public university founded in 1858

== Former institutions ==
- Free University of Brussels (1834–1969), a university which split along linguistic lines in 1970
- Catholic University of Brussels, a Dutch-medium university founded in 1969
- New University of Brussels, a university in operation from 1894 to 1919
