= Gabrielle Weidner =

Dutch resistance fighter during World War II (1914–1945)

- Born: August 17, 1914; Brussels, Belgium
- Died: 17 April 1945 (aged 30)
- Military career
- Unit: French Resistance
- Conflicts: World War II
- Awards: Dutch Cross of Resistance
- Memorials: Orry-la-Ville honorary cemetery

Gabrielle Weidner (17 August 1914 in Brussels – 17 February 1945 in Königsberg in der Neumark) was a Dutch resistance fighter playing an active role in the French Resistance during World War II.

== Early life ==
Gabrielle Weidner was born in Brussels to Dutch parents. She spent her childhood in Switzerland, close to the French border. Her father, Johan Henry Weidner Sr., taught Latin and Greek at the Seventh-day Adventist Church in Collonges-sous-Salève, a village on the French side of the border. Attending secondary school in London, Gabrielle learned to speak several languages.

== Activities during World War II ==
A devoutly religious woman, Gabrielle was living and doing church work for the Seventh-day Adventists in Paris at the outbreak of World War II. With the ensuing German occupation of France, she fled with her brother Jean Weidner and several others to Lyon, in the unoccupied part of France. Following the 22 June 1940 signing of the agreement with the Nazis to create Vichy France, she returned to Paris while her brother went to Lyon where he established the "Dutch-Paris" underground.

In Paris, she resumed her work for the Seventh-day Adventist Church. With the help of her brother and other volunteers, she secretly coordinated plans for people to escape from occupied Paris, following the Dutch-Paris routes out of France into Switzerland or Spain. She thus helped rescue at least 1,080 people, including 800 Dutch Jews and more than 112 downed Allied airmen.

== Arrest ==
In February 1944, a young female courier was arrested by the French police and extradited to the Gestapo. Against all rules, she had a notebook with her containing names and addresses of Dutch-Paris members. She was brutally interrogated by a guard that held her head under cold water repeatedly. Under torture she revealed many names of key members of the underground network. As a result, a large number of Dutch-Paris members were arrested. The name of Jean's sister, Gabrielle, was among those in the notepad. She was arrested by the Gestapo and imprisoned at Fresnes prison in Paris, as it was hoped that her comrades would try to free her. In Fresnes she was treated fairly good, but when this trap did not work, she was shipped by railway cattle car to a concentration camp at Ravensbrück in Germany.

She entered Königsberg / Neumark, a women's subcamp of Ravensbrück. The camp was called Petit-Königsberg by the French prisoners to distinguish the village in Neumark from the city Königsberg in East Prussia. In this concentration camp, the conditions were inhumane, and she was subjected to hard labor and beatings by camp guards. On 17 February 1945, several days after the liberation by Soviet troops, Gabrielle died in Königsberg / Neumark from the effects of malnutrition.

== Recognition ==
On 24 May 1950, Gabrielle Weidner posthumously received the Dutch Cross of Resistance for her efforts in the war. On the Dutch Orry-la-Ville honorary cemetery (north of Paris), her name is recorded on a plaque dedicated to the Dutch resistors.

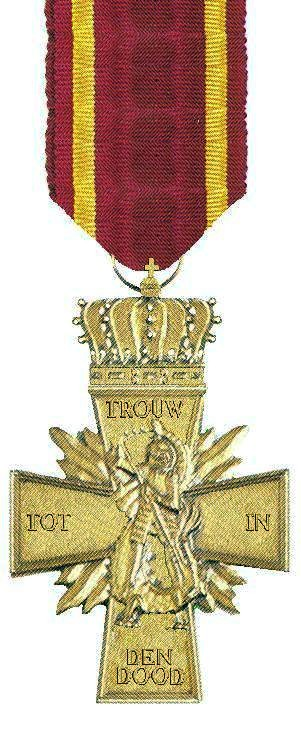
Cross of Resistance 1940–1945

== Sources ==
- Koreman, Megan (2018). The Escape Line: How the Ordinary Heroes of Dutch-Paris Resisted the Nazi Occupation of Western Europe. Oxford University Press. ISBN 978-0-19-066229-5.
- How to Flee the Gestapo - Searching for the Dutch-Paris Escape Line - PhD M. Koreman
- The Weidner Foundation
