= Yvonne Jospa =

Belgian Resistance leader

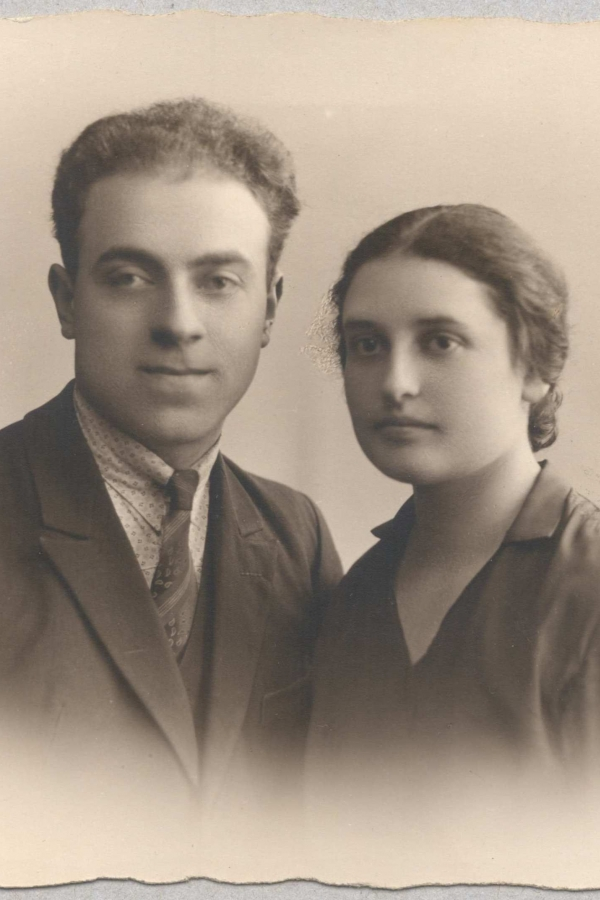
Hertz and Yvonne Jospa

Yvonne Jospa (née Have Groisman, February 3, 1910 in Poputi, Bessarabia – January 20, 2000 in Brussels) was a cofounder and leading organizer of the Comité de Défense des Juifs in September 1942 with her husband Hertz Jospa, which saved over 3,000 Jewish children from deportation and death. Yvonne Jaspar was her pseudonym in the Belgian Resistance.

== Biography ==
Born in a well-to-do Bessarabian Jewish family, Groisman attended the Jewish gymnasium in Chişinău (present-day Moldova), coming to Belgium with the intention to study at the University of Liège, in the Philosophy and Letters section. However, she changed direction, studying to become a social worker. In 1933 she married Hertz Jospa, and they both became activists, first in the Belgian Communist Party, then in 1936 in the anti-racism organisation Ligue contre le racisme et l'antisémitisme, the Belgian section of the Ligue internationale contre l'antisémitime. She took part in hosting child refugees from the Spanish Civil War and in arranging secret passage through Belgium of volunteers for the International Brigades. In 1942, together with her husband and resistance figures Chaim and Fela Perelman, she established the Comité de Défense des Juifs (CDJ), one of the principal Jewish resistance organizations in occupied Belgium.

Jospa's husband Herz Jospa was arrested in June 1943, detained in Fort Breendonk, then deported to Buchenwald concentration camp in May 1944. She thought he had died there, but he came back on May 8, 1945, after the camp was liberated by American troops.

In 1964, Jospa co-founded the Union des Anciens Résistants Juifs de Belgique (Union of former Jewish resistance members of Belgium), of which she remained honorary chairperson until her death in 2000. She was also a cofounder, with her husband and others, of the Belgian chapter of the communist-led Mouvement contre le racisme, l'antisémitisme et pour la paix (M.R.A.P., "Movement against racism and antisemitism, and for peace") founded in Paris in 1949. The Belgian branch was renamed in 1966 to Mouvement contre le racisme, l'antisémitisme et la xénophobie (M.R.A.X., "Movement against racism, antisemitism and xenophobia"). She was a staunch communist but at the same time refused to endorse anti-zionist stances after 1947. She was made an honorary member of the L'Enfant Caché association ("The hidden child").

In January 2003, Jospa's name was given to a road in Brussels, rue Yvonne Jospa.

== Additional bibliography and filmography ==
- French: Maurice Bolle, Jean Fonteyne, Ianchelevici et al., Le combat de Hertz Jospa, Brussels, Editions des 9, 1970, 104 p.
- French: Jean-Marie Faux, Hertz et Hava Jospa, in : Jean-Philippe Schreiber (ed.), Hertz Jospa, juif, résistant, communiste, Editions Vie Ouvrière - Mrax, Bruxelles, 1997, 160 p. ISBN 2870033362 ISBN 978-2-87003-336-4
- French: Myriam Abramowicz et Esther Hoffenberg, Comme si c’était hier, Ping-Pong Production (Distribution National Center for Jewish Film, Brandeis University), 1980, 86 minutes, documentary
