= Karl-Heinz Gerstner =

- Born: November 15, 1912; Berlin-Charlottenburg, German Empire
- Died: December 14, 2005 (aged 93); Kleinmachnow, Brandenburg, Germany
- Education: Frederick-William University, Berlin
- Occupations: government lawyer diplomatic assistant journalist
- Political party: Socialist Unity Party (1957–1989); Nazi Party (1933–1945)
- Spouse: Sibylle Boden-Gerstner (1920-2016)
- Children: Daniela Dahn; Sonja Gerstner (1952-1971)
- Parent(s): Dr. Karl Ritter (natural father: 1883-1968); Dr.Paul Gerstner (legal father through adoption: 1880-1945)

Karl-Heinz Gerstner (15 November 1912 – 14 December 2005) trained as a lawyer and then worked during the war for the German diplomatic service in Paris. Following the war he was released from internment as a Soviet prisoner of war after producing a number of affidavits testifying to his helpfulness to members of the French Resistance during the course of his time at the German embassy in occupied Paris. He was then able to reinvent himself as an East German journalist.

Controversy later emerged, and has persisted, as to the nature and extent of his parallel career as a Stasi informer.

== Life ==
=== Early years and education ===
Karl-Heinz Gerstner was born in the Charlottenburg quarter of Berlin. His natural father was the diplomat Karl Ritter (1883–1968) who later became an ambassador. However, his legal father was actually his step-father, Paul Gerstner (1880–1945), an academic who taught Economics and hoped that his adopted son would grow up to become a statutory auditor. He attended the Kaiser-Friedrich Gymnasium (secondary school) in Berlin between 1917 and 1931. In 1921 he became a member of the Youth Association and Path finder scouting organisations, remaining a member of the latter till 1930. At school, he later recalled, a love of the French language and culture was awakened in him. It was also during this period that he won a public speaking competition staged for Berlin school children by the Library of Congress in Washington. His prize was six months abroad during 1928, as a pupil at the Tabor Academy, a prestigious private school in Massachusetts.

Renewed economic austerity following the Wall Street Crash triggered a period of accelerating political polarisation in Germany, and Gerstner chose the extreme left, in 1931 joining the "German Youth of 1 November 1929" scouting group, which tended to take its lead from the Communist Party. He remained a member till 1932. Fellow members whom he came across at this time included Friedrich Wolf, Harro Schulze-Boysen, Heinrich, Count von Einsiedel and the group's founder, Eberhard Koebel. Between 1931 and 1935 Gerstner studied Jurisprudence at Berlin's Frederick-William University (as the Humboldt was then known). As a student he funded his living costs by working part-time at the foreign-exchange desk of the Deutsche Bank. Towards the end of 1932 he began to take part in evening tutorials held by Kurt Georg Kiesinger.

In 1931 he joined the socialist "Red students group". On 1 May 1933 he joined the Nazi party: he was member number 2,673,178. Party membership had surged since January 1933 when the Nazis took power and lost no time in transforming Germany into a one-party dictatorship. Nevertheless, in his autobiography published in 1999 Gerstner evidently identified an inconsistency which could not go unremarked. He had taken the step, he wrote, only "out of hatred against Hitler ... in order [to do] something against the Nazis" (nur aus "Hass gegen Hitler ...um etwas gegen die Nazis" zu tun). With half an eye on Gerstner's subsequent career as a German diplomat, there were commentators who found the explanation less than persuasive.

It was on the recommendation of the head of the legal department at Deutsche Bank that Gerstner wrote his doctoral dissertation on aspects of the modalities of interbank payments ("Treugiroverkehr"). He received his doctorate of laws from the University of Erlangen in 1937.

=== Nazi Germany ===
Gerstner passed his Level 1 national law exams in 1935 and embarked on the next stage of the legal traineeship ("Rechtsreferendariat"), starting with six months at the district court in Rheinsberg. That was followed by a six-month period working at a solicitors' office in Berlin that specialised in cases that involved economics, where (despite the growing prevalence of state mandated antisemitism since 1933) two of the senior lawyers were of Jewish provenance. For the next three years, between 1936 and 1939, he worked in Paris and the German foreign trade mission. This appears to have counted, at least initially, as part of his "Rechtsreferendariat" (legal traineeship). Gerstner was marked out for advancement soon after his arrival at Paris trade mission, partly on account of his excellent mastery of the language: the fact that during this time his father became the German ambassador to Brazil may also have counted in Gerstner's favour with German diplomatic staff in Paris. After a few weeks he was offered a permanent position at the newly expanded trade mission, and his status as an "articled law clerk" was apparently suspended or overlooked. In August 1939 all the trade mission staff in Paris were returned to Berlin where Gerstner pursued his legal traineeship, employed as a "Gerichtsassessor" (loosely: "trainee judge"). Gerstner stayed in Germany for around six months. During this time he met Sibylle Boden at a ski resort in the Riesengebirge (literally "Giant Mountains") in southern Silesia. Boden, who later became a highly successful fashion designer, noticed the excellent quality of the suit he was wearing. Evidently there were other mutual attractions, since the two of them would quickly become a couple: in 1945 they married.

In February 1940 Gerstner finally completed his legal training, apparently passing the necessary exams. The simultaneous Invasion of Poland by Nazi Germany and the Soviet Union, launched in September 1939, had triggered the Second World War, and shortly after passing his law exams he received call-up papers requiring him to join the army. However, in the end Gerstner was spared from military service as a result of injuries caused by childhood polio. At the same time the Foreign Ministry offered him a job based on his mastery of the French language, and in April 1940 he started work as a translator in the ministry's radio department. His core responsibilities involved translating "propaganda texts" into French. There is reason to think that even at this stage he was not beyond applying a little ad hoc diplomacy, where appropriate. Working in the broadcasting department of Ribbentrop's Foreign Ministry placed him at the heart of a potentially serious "turf war" with the Propaganda Ministry under Goebbels. Ribbentrop believed that broadcasting propaganda to foreigners was a matter for the Foreign Ministry. Shortly after he joined the department Gerstner was asked by his head of department, Gerhard Rühle, if he could think of anyone with sufficient natural authority to defend the ministry in any possible future conflict with Goebbels. Gerstner thought of, and recommended, his old law tutor, Kurt Georg Kiesinger. Kiesinger had, by this time, already received his call-up papers, requiring him to join the army. However, on 5 April 1940 he was offered and accepted a top job with the increasingly important broadcasting department at the Foreign Ministry. It was essential work which cancelled out the requirement to join the army. In this way, Gerstner played a key role in keeping a future West German Chancellor away from Nazi Germany's wartime frontline.

=== Wartime in Paris ===
The foreign ministry radio department effectively introduced Karl-Heinz Gerstner to the world of wartime news journalism. Because of his subsequent career as a well-regarded journalist in East Germany Karl-Heinz Gerstner had many more opportunities than most people retrospectively to present his wartime career selectively: there have been suggestions that his enthusiastic pro-government pronouncements, which many sources play down, would have figured more prominently in the record of his wartime career if the war itself had ended differently. Certainly Gerstner's actions in support of the French resistance agenda became anything but covert in 1946, and some, at least, of the more pressing evidence supporting it appears to sourced, directly or indirectly, from his own writings.

France was invaded in May/June 1940. The military phase of the operation was completed much more rapidly than French military planners had expected, and in July 1940 Karl-Heinz was sent back to Paris as an "Academic support assistant in the Economy Department" at the German embassy in Paris. In his own later autobiographical contributions he indicated that this was more a continuation of his previous role than might appear from the job title: he was also keen to stress the difference between members of the permanent diplomatic corps hierarchy and those, such as himself, seconded to the embassy from outside the "civil service" talent pool. In some ways this allowed him a flexibility in interpreting and defining his role which would not have been available to a career diplomat. Reports indicate that his superiors found him to be highly competent, with a useful personal charm and excellent contacts to the local business community that enabled him to provide exceptionally reliable reports. There is an assessment from a relatively unsympathetic commentator that for many practical purposes he quickly came to replace Hans Kuntze, his somewhat "laid-back" head of department.

Gerstner remained in Paris till May 1944. (The city was liberated from German occupation a couple of months later.) He was able to support the French Resistance by secretly passing on information and, especially before 1943, by providing travel permits for the unoccupied southern part of France, thereby rescuing numerous Jewish families facing the threat of deportation to death camps in Germany. During the second half of 1944 and then till the war ended in May 1945 Gerstner was back in Berlin employed, at least officially, at the Foreign Ministry, in the "Special office for news procurement" ("Sonderreferat für Nachrichtenbeschaffung"). It has been suggested - perhaps uncharitably - that this gave him an opportunity to hone a peculiar talent for charming people into providing information that he could then pass on for pecuniary gain, which after 1975 would by of significant value to the East Germany Ministry for Security (Stasi). Other sources refer to his having undertaken "illegal political work" - implicitly on behalf of the still illegal Communist Party - in the Berlin quarter of Wilmersdorf where he had ended up. Fellow antifascists with whom he operated included Leo Dyck, Herbert Eppinger, and Gerhard Fuchs.

=== Soviet occupation zone ===
By the time the war ended the victorious powers had agreed upon the division of the western two-thirds of post-war Germany into four military occupation zones. Arrangements would, however, be confirmed at the Potsdam Conference in July/August 1945. Berlin itself was to be separately treated, surrounded by the Soviet occupation zone and itself administered as four separate military zones (or "sectors"). On 2 May 1945, a few days before the formal end of the war, the local Soviet commander appointed Karl-Heinz Gerstner to serve as "second deputy mayor" in Berlin-Wilmersdorf. However, it had already been agreed that Wilmersdorf would be administered as part of the British sector, and in July the Red army troops withdrew to the pre-agreed frontiers, leaving the British to take control in this part of Berlin. British military police arrested Gerstner on 24 July 1945, reasoning that since he had worked at the German embassy in Paris he must have been a senior Nazi official. They handed him over to the Soviet sector to be detained pending further decisions. He was now taken to in the underground NKVD prisoner of war holding centre in what had previously been the cellar for keeping the bodies of dead animals cool at the former Veterinary Medicine Institute in central Berlin. On 21 September 1945 he was moved to "more appropriate" accommodation in Special Internment Camp 3 at Berlin-Hohenschönhausen. Now, however, Sibylle Boden-Gerstner (as she had become) was able to deliver to the Soviet district commander 23 written statements from friends and former Resistance activists whom Karl-Heinz and Sibylle had known during their time in Paris. The statements demonstrated that Gerstner (unlike most of the staff at the Paris embassy) had never been a convinced Nazi, and they included several sworn statements attesting ways in which he had helped Resistance members during the war. The Soviets were convinced, and Gerstner was released from detention on 21 January 1946. Gerstner later claimed that while he was held in Soviet detention he had succeeded in communicating with his wife using Kassiber code. It had taken his wife six months to organise the written statements, and she had entered a closed military zone in the city "under fire" from a Soviet sentry in order to hand over the papers. In his memoire Gernstner concluded the chapter in question, "I owe her my life". There was no resentment on Gerstner's part over his seven months of incarceration: his return to freedom was accompanied by "complete understanding for the Soviets who persecuted the fascists" ("mit vollem Verständnis für die Sovjets, die die Fascisten verfolgten"), according to information in the Stasi records that became available after 1990.

One thing which Gerstner's memoires conspicuously fail to mention, but which became clear when investigators reviewed the relevant files in the Stasi archives after reunification, is that by the time he was released by the Soviets in January 1946 he had already been signed up by Soviet intelligence as an "agent". He also submitted an application to join the newly reinstated German Communist Party. The application appears to have been rejected on account of his Nazi Party membership during the Hitler years, however.

As early as July 1946 the occupying powers permitted Gerstner to visit France in order to say "farewell" to people whom he had last known under wartime conditions (and possibly also to thank in person some of those whose written testimonies had contributed to his release from detention six months earlier). In Autumn 1946 he was recruited into the "National German administration for inter-zonal and foreign trade" ("Deutsche Zentralverwaltung für Interzonen- und Außenhandel") which the Soviets were setting up. Meanwhile, the Communist Party of Germany had disappeared, subsumed, along with the Social Democrats (if only, effectively, in the Soviet zone) into the new Socialist Unity Party ("Sozialistische Einheitspartei Deutschlands" / SED), as the result of a contentious political merger implemented in April 1946 and intended, it was said, to unite the political left as a bulwark against a return of fascism. Intriguingly, the personnel department of the SED attempted (without success) to block Gerstner's recruitment into the Soviet-sponsored "trade administration". They cited strong doubts over Gerstner's assertion that he had joined the Nazi Party back in 1933 only because he had been mandated to do so by a communist student organisation, and they speculated over a possible "connection" to the Soviet security services.

Although the political differences implicit in the military and administrative division of Berlin since 1945 would, after 1949, be replicated by increasingly stark social, economic and eventually physical barriers, during the late 1940s Berliners could pass freely between "sectors", often with little reason to know where the frontiers were. Wilmersdorf, where Gerstner continued to live after the Soviets released him, was in the British sector. However, many in his social circle were living in the US sector where he would visit and engage in discussions with politically like-minded friends including Iwan Katz and Hans Oliva-Hagen. The larger-than-life polemicist Wolfgang Leonhard was another friend. In Wilmersdorf Gerstner built up another political discussion circle: participants included Rainer Hildebrandt, Günter Neumann and Fritz Teppich.

=== German Democratic Republic ===
In December 1948 Gerstner embarked on a career as an economic journalist, his contributions appearing in the Berliner Zeitung. He would work for the publication for more than forty years. It was at the request of the newspaper's management that in 1949 he moved house, relocating to what was becoming known as East Berlin. In October 1949 the entire Soviet occupation zone was rebranded and relaunched as the Soviet sponsored German Democratic Republic, a new kind of German one-party dictatorship. He moved again in 1952/53, settling with his wife and their two daughters in Kleinmachnow, a suburb on the southside of the city.

According to one source, it was only after nine rejected attempts that in 1957 Gerstner's application for party membership was accepted. His career, meanwhile, was progressing well. In 1955 he started making weekly contributions as a commentator to a programme of economic analysis, transmitted each Sunday on DDR1, a national radio channel in East Germany. He continued to give these radio talks till 1988, concluding each week with the words "sachlich, kritisch und optimistisch wie immer" (loosely "as ever, factual, critical and optimistic"), a motto the first part of which he would later re-activate as the title for his 1999 autobiography. This was the only regular programme dealing expressly with economics in the schedules. Between 1965 and 1978 he appeared regularly on "Prisma", a long-running DFF television programme for which he was employed as the economic commentator, also including in his presentations some political aspects of topics covered and, on occasion hints of political criticism in his analyses. Gerstner became a favourite with viewers, on several occasions topping popularity polls for television personalities. He could be - and sometimes was - described as something of an institution in the German Democratic Republic.

=== Final years ===
Karl-Heinz Gerstner retired in May 1989. His autobiography appeared ten years later, with the title "Sachlich, kritisch und optimistisch". He died at Kleinmachnow a couple of weeks after his ninety-third birthday.

== Personal ==
Karl-Heinz married Sibylle Boden (1920–2016) in 1945. She was the founder of the popular fashion magazine Sibylle. The writer Daniela Dahn is their daughter. The couple's younger daughter, the artist Sonja Gerstner (1952–1971), died young.

== Stasi ==
In 1989 Götz Aly reacted to the appearance of Gerstner's autobiography with a powerfully critical piece in Gerstner's old newspaper, the Berliner Zeitung. Researches in the Stasi records showed that Gerstner had been registered with the ministry as an informer since 1975. He had been identified in Stasi files under the code name "IM Ritter", a characteristically ironic choice of name, since apart from "Ritter" being the German word for "knight", Gerstner's biological father had been the Nazi diplomat Karl Ritter. The Stasi had paid Gerstner a supplementary salary amounting to 2,000 marks per month for his information. Aly adduced the example of the remarkable East German actor-singer Manfred Krug. The relevant information was already in the public domain, since it had been disclosed in Krug's own memoires. In 1976 Krug was banned from performing in public because he participated in protests against the expulsion from the country and deprivation of citizenship suffered by his friend, the popular singer Wolf Biermann. In 1976, unable to work as a stage-performer in East Germany, Krug had applied for permission to emigrate. He had received a visit from Gerstner in April 1977. During the visit, Krug said Gerstner had suggested that he (Krug) might consider working for the Ministry for State Security (Stasi). The report of Gerstner's visit to Krug is also documented in the Stasi records. The report from "IM Ritter" included the information that Krug had kept a diary. It stated that Krug had taken him to be a Stasi informer, but after a while had nevertheless relaxed enough for an open discussion to take place between the two men.

In his 1999 autobiography Gerstner had indeed written of how he had reported on conversations with foreign diplomats to the HVA (which was the foreign intelligence branch of the Ministry for State Security). In March 2000 he took the opportunity to publish in the Berliner Zeitung a ferocious rejection of Aly's piece, which appeared under the headline "Weder ein Held, noch ein Feigling" (loosely "Not a hero, nor a coward") and was described as "Ein besonderer Leserbrief" ("A special [kind of] reader's letter"). Gerstner wrote: "Ali asserts that I concealed my activity for the Stasi in the book. That is not true - I was what both sides needed, and knew how to use, a back channel".

A few weeks later another review of Gerstner's autobiography was published, this time by Jochen Staadt, writing for the Frankfurter Allgemeine Zeitung. Staadt's tone is notably less shrill than Ali's, but he does not entirely exonerate Gerstner of the implicit charge that his memoire is excessively selective in its treatment of the Stasi connections. Although the changes that heralded the end of the East German dictatorship were largely peaceful in nature, many of the carefully stored and indexed records kept in the regional Stasi offices were hastily gathered up and incinerated. In many cities, when they realised what was being done, indignant citizens broke in to the offices to try and ensure that as many as possible of the records might be retained, in order to be used evidence in the event of future prosecutions. What survived in respect of "IM Ritter" - Karl-Heinz Gerstner - was approximately 2,000 pages covering the years 1975 to 1985. Staadt is not entirely persuaded by the thread he identifies in Gerstner's book whereby the author was constantly on the right side of history even where he pretended not to be, as a socialist student who joined the Nazis to resist them from within, as an embassy worker under the Nazis who helped the French Resistance, as an East German socialist who always knew what was wrong with the system, who sympathised with the victims of the Prague Spring and who was right all along about Gorbachev.

Gerstner writes in his autobiography that he was asked by the Politburo member Hermann Axen to involve himself socially with the western diplomats "in support of a peaceful future", and to provide reports for the Stasi on matters which might be relevant to government foreign policy. Surviving Stasi records indicate there may have been a little more to it than that. They refer to Gerstner having been "recruited by Soviet friends to educate former Nazi members and gather information" back in 1946. KGB handlers had shown particular interest in Trotzkyists among his contacts in the French Resistance, and in former Foreign Ministry employees. After a time, however, the KGB seem to have downgraded Gerstner's usefulness as they decided that his relevant knowledge was becoming out of date, and they passed his details across to their East German counterparts. East Germany was granted observer status at the United Nations in 1972 and admitted to full membership in September 1973. The Ministry for State Security (Stasi) reacted by transferring some of the journalists on their books to the "Defence department". In Gerstner's case, the transfer took place at his apartment in November 1975. He was introduced to his new handler and given his new instructions. He was to establish contact with diplomats, especially from those states which were "of significance because of their political activities against the German Democratic Republic". Superfluous clarification followed: he was to concentrate his efforts on diplomats from "West Germany, the USA, England, France - above all, NATO countries". The East German security services would see to it that he would be included on the guest lists for diplomatic receptions and provide other resources to help him deepen his contacts with relevant diplomats.

Gerstner asserts in his memoires that he "did not feel he was being required to do anything dishonest. [He] knew only too well how to differentiate between what was confidential, private and nobody else's business on the one hand, and on the other what was a diplomatic message." But his reports to his Stasi handlers were not restricted to things that Günter Gaus, Egon Bahr, Otto Bräutigam and others had said at regular diplomatic receptions. Gaus' assessment, passed on by Gerstner in 1976, that the flood of applications to leave the country indicated that "the political situation in the German Democratic Republic [was] not very stable" might be seen as a simple "diplomatic report". The same could be said for the Indian ambassador's urgings concerning acceptance of educated migrants from India including the representation that "the migration policy must be made more generous". But the same cannot be said about Gernstner's string of communications about East German citizens turning up, without official permission, to take part in receptions at West German embassies, nor about his digging around to identify Wolf Biermann's contacts. There was nothing innocuous about handing over a text critical of the government drafted by Wolfgang Harich, or the details of what was said at a meeting involving Manfred Krug in the private home of a US citizen. In his defiantly self-justifying composition, the author of the autobiography recalls nothing about those reports to the East German security services.

By the time he reaches his concluding paragraph, Jochen Staadt's review of Gerstner's autobiography has become as angry as Ali's: "What is presented as factual, critical and optimistic is in reality shallow, mawkish, opportunistic and untruthful. profoundly untruthful."

== Awards and honours ==
- 1982 Patriotic Order of Merit in gold
- 1987 Patriotic Order of Merit gold clasp
