= Committee for the Defence of Jews =

Belgian resistance group during World War II

Committee for the Defence of Jews Comité de Défense des Juifs Joods Verdedigingscomiteit
- Leaders: Hertz Jospa; Yvonne Jospa
- Dates active: September 1942~
- Active regions: Across Belgium
- Wars: the Belgian Resistance (World War II)

The Committee for the Defence of Jews (French: Comité de Défense des Juifs, or CDJ; Dutch: Joods Verdedigingscomiteit, JVD) was a group within the Belgian Resistance, affiliated to the Front de l'Indépendance, founded by the Jewish Communist Hertz Jospa and his wife Have Groisman (Yvonne Jospa) of Solidarité juive in September 1942. It was founded in the house of Fela and Chaim Perelman.

The CDJ had thirty-odd members in its children's section alone. These members formed an effective committee and came from all political and religious horizons, overcoming their divergent views to unite for the sake of saving Jewish children. The CDJ succeeded in saving about 3,000 of the 5,000 children who became so-called hidden children (enfants cachés; hidden among non-Jewish Belgian families, convents, etc.). The CDJ was also involved in other aspects of the resistance, producing the clandestine publications such as the Yiddish periodical Unser Wort ("Our Word").

The CDJ also functioned as a national organisation in the field of social services. Its Children Section became responsible for hiding and supporting those who had gone underground. The co-operation and assistance from the non-Jewish sector was remarkable. As a result of its actions, it is thought that around 3,000 Jews were rescued from deportation. The price paid for this campaign, however, was high. Many members of the CDJ together with their collaborators were arrested by the authorities.

== See also ==
- The Holocaust in Belgium
- Edmond Chait
- Andrée Geulen
- Victor Martin (sociologist)

== Additional bibliography and filmography ==
- Vromen, Suzanne (2008). Hidden Children of the Holocaust: Belgian Nuns and their Daring Rescue of Young Jews from the Nazis. Oxford: Oxford University Press. ISBN 978-0-19-518128-9.
- Steinberg, Lucien (1973). Le Comité de défense des juifs en Belgique, 1942-1944. Brussels: Éditions de l'Université de Bruxelles.
- Maxime Steinberg, "L'enfant caché, le défi à la Shoah" in Isabelle Emery (ed.), Histoire et mémoire des Juifs d'Anderlecht Années 20-40, Anderlecht, 2009
