= Johan Hendrik Weidner =

Dutch World War II hero

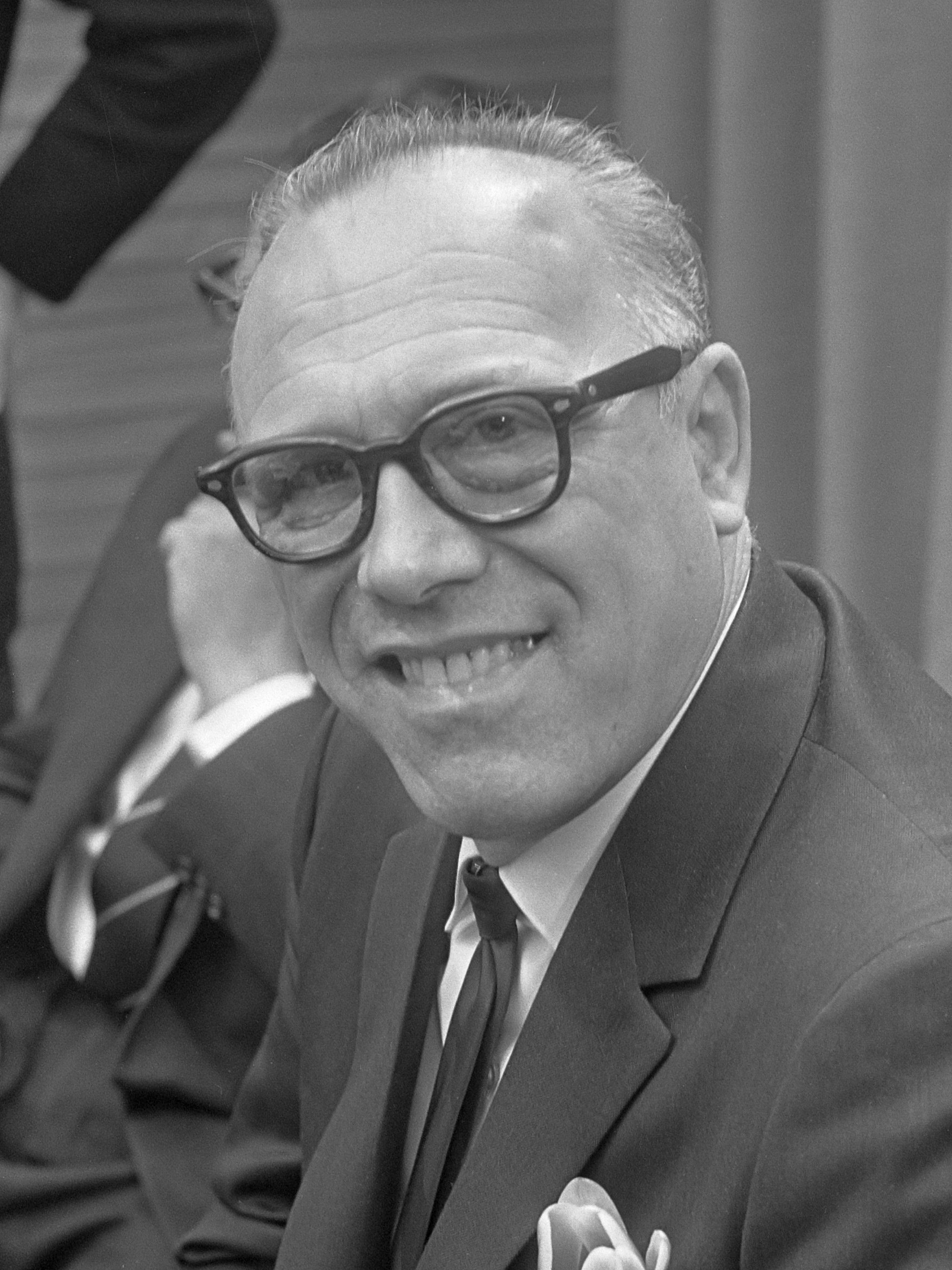
- Weidner in 1967
- Born: October 22, 1912; Brussels, Belgium
- Died: May 21, 1994 (aged 81); Monterey Park, California, U.S.
- Military career
- Conflicts: Second World War

Johan Hendrik Weidner (October 22, 1912, in Brussels, Belgium – May 21, 1994, in Monterey Park, California, United States) was a highly decorated Dutch hero of World War II.

== Early life ==
Johan Hendrik Weidner Jr. was born in Brussels to Dutch parents. Although his birth name was Johan Hendrik, he used to call himself "Jean" and later in the U.S., "John". He was the eldest of four children, and grew up in Switzerland, near the French border at Collonges-sous-Salève - a village in the French department of Haute-Savoie, where his father taught Latin and Greek at the Seventh-day Adventist Church seminary.

Following his education at French public schools, he attended basic courses at the Seventh-day Adventist Seminary in Collonges-sous-Salève. His father Johan Hendrik Weidner Sr. who studied at the University of Geneva, and had been a minister for the Seventh-day Adventists in Brussels and Switzerland, hoped Jean would follow in his footsteps. To his father's regret, he decided to go into business, and in 1935 he established a textile import/export business in Paris, France.

Around this time he went to Geneva to attend sessions of the League of Nations, and saw firsthand how ineffective that body was in preventing the outbreak of war in 1939.

== Activities during World War II ==
At the outbreak of World War II Jean was living in Paris. With the subsequent German occupation of France he fled with several others from Paris to Lyon in the unoccupied part of France. Because he had to abandon his Parisian business, he began a new business in Lyon. In 1941, Jean founded "Dutch-Paris", an underground network of which the location of his Lyonnaise textile business soon became its headquarters. In order to get passes to go in and out of the Swiss frontier zone, he set up a second textile shop in Annecy at the end of 1942.

Dutch-Paris became one of the largest and most successful underground networks for people persecuted for faith or race, Allied pilots, and persons of great Dutch importance to help them escape via Switzerland and Spain. This escape route was also used for smuggling documents. In the Netherlands this message line was also known as "The Swiss Way".

In its heyday, 300 people were part of this underground network, of which about 150 people were arrested. 40 people were slain or died from the effects of captivity, including his sister who helped to coordinate escapes from Paris. The escape route has greatly contributed to the French Resistance, and is responsible for the rescue of more than 1,080 people, including 800 Dutch Jews and more than 112 downed Allied pilots. Jean was one of the most sought after underground leaders of France, for whom the Gestapo at one time offered a reward of five million francs for his arrest.

== Arrests ==
In February 1944, a young female courier was arrested by the French police and extradited to the Gestapo. Against all rules, she had a notebook with her containing names and addresses of Dutch-Paris members. She was brutally interrogated by a guard that held her head under cold water until she nearly drowned. Under torture she revealed many names of key members of the underground network. As a result, a large number of Dutch-Paris members were arrested (See more details in Suzanne Hiltermann-Souloumiac).

The name of Jean's sister Gabrielle Weidner was among the names listed in the notepad. She was arrested by the Gestapo and imprisoned at the Fresnes prison in Paris, because it was hoped for that her comrades would try to free her. In Fresnes she was treated well, but when this ploy did not work, she was shipped to Ravensbrück concentration camp in Germany. She later died of the effects of malnutrition, only a few days after liberation by the Russians.

During the occupation, Jean was arrested by both French gendarmerie and French Milice, including the Swiss border police. The French gendarmerie beat him up brutally, but they had to release him later due to lack of evidence. In another arrest by the Milice in Toulouse he was tortured, but he managed to escape before they could transfer him to the Gestapo. The Gestapo were never able to get a hold of him.

== After the war ==
In November 1944, after the Liberation of France Weidner was invited to London by Queen Wilhelmina, to come to tell her about the "Dutch-Paris" escape route, and the situation of Dutch civilians in France and Belgium. In the same year he was made a Captain in the Dutch Armed Forces, after which he could be in charge of the Dutch Security Service based in Paris. His service was in charge of vetting all the Dutch citizens in France and Belgium to look for any that collaborated with the Germans.

The Bureau of National Security, the Department of Justice, and the Dutch Embassy in Paris all claimed authority for Netherlands Security Service. Therefore, it has never become entirely clear under whose direction he fell.

In mid 1946, Jean was suddenly dismissed by the Dutch government, arguing that they needed a professional policeman on the post. After his work with the security he picked up the threads of normal life again, and returned to his import/export textile business. In 1955 he emigrated to the United States, eventually settling in California where from 1958 he and his wife Naomi operated a chain of health food stores.

== Recognition ==
For his War efforts, Weidner was awarded the United States Medal of Freedom with Gold Palm, made an Honorary Officer of the Order of the British Empire, an Officer in the Dutch Order of Orange-Nassau. The French Government honored him with the Croix de Guerre and Médaille de la Résistance and the Légion d'honneur. The Belgian Government made him an Officer of the Order of Leopold.

At the 1993 opening of the United States Holocaust Memorial Museum in Washington, D.C. he was one of seven persons chosen to light candles recognizing the rescuers. The Israeli government honored Weidner as one of the gentiles designated as Righteous Among the Nations at Israel's national Holocaust Memorial, Yad Vashem where a grove of trees was planted in his name on the Hill of Remembrance along the Avenue of the Righteous.

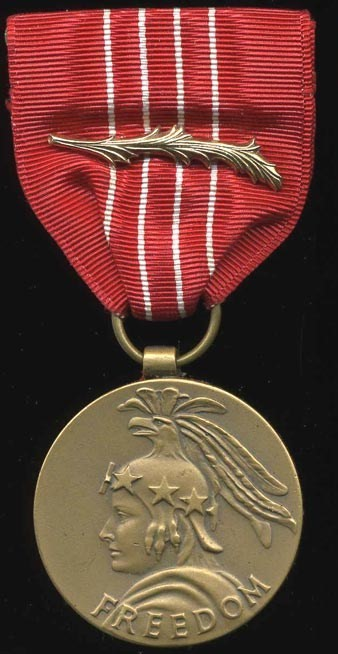
Medal of Freedom with gold palm

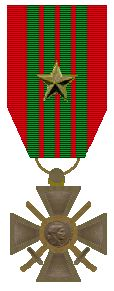
Croix de Guerre 1940 1945

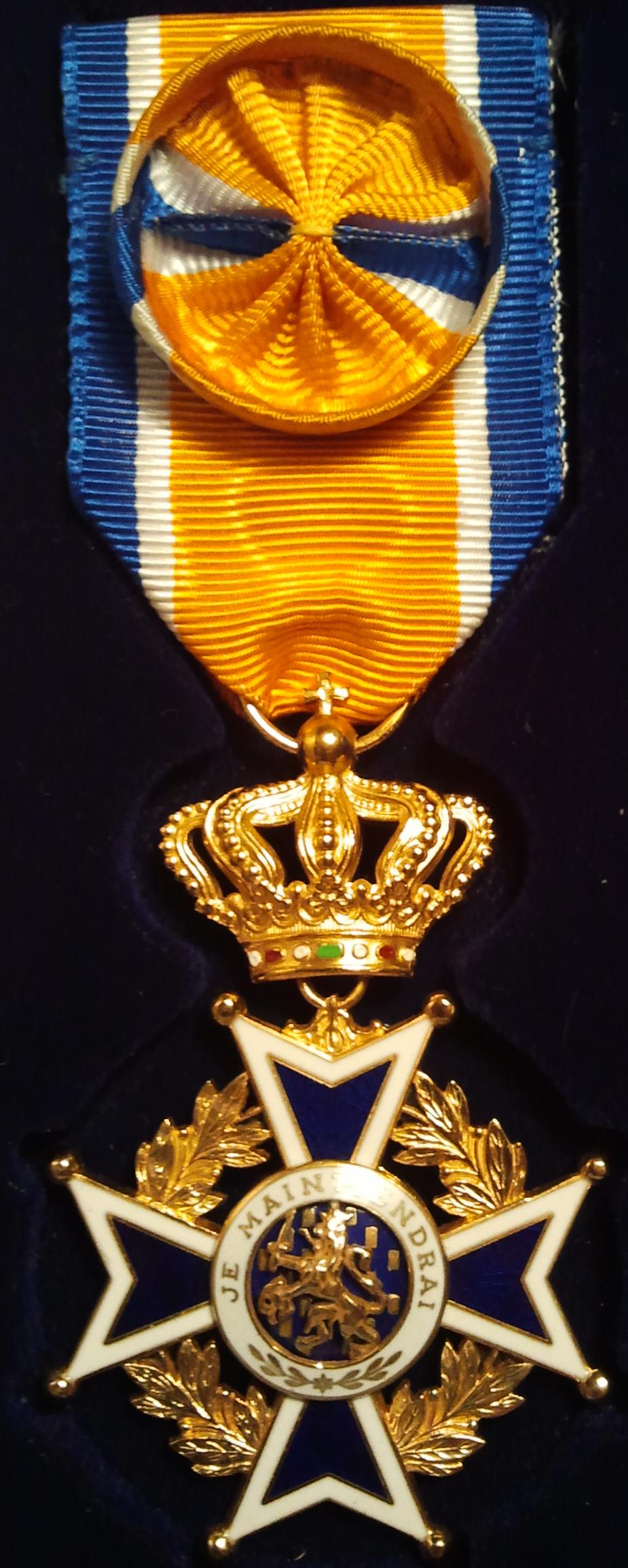
Officers of the Order of Orange-Nassau

== Sources ==
- How to Flee the Gestapo - Searching for the Dutch-Paris Escape Line - PhD M. Koreman
- The Weidner Foundation
- Koreman, Megan (2018). The Escape Line: How the Ordinary Heroes of Dutch-Paris Resisted the Nazi Occupation of Western Europe. Oxford University Press. ISBN 978-0-19-066229-5.
- Ganter, Kurt (2013). A Heart Open to the Suffering of Others - The John Henry Weidner Story, The Journal of Adventist Education, summer 2013, pp. 28–32
