= Alfonsina Bueno =

- Born: Alfonsina Bueno Vela; 26 January 1915; Moros, Zaragoza, Spain
- Died: 3 January 1979 (aged 63); Tolosa, Occitania, France
- Spouse: Josep Ester i Borràs
- Military career
- Allegiance: Free France
- Service: French Resistance
- Service years: 1941–1943
- Unit: Ponzán group
- Conflicts: World War II

Alfonsina Bueno Vela (1915–1979) was a Spanish activist who joined the French Resistance in 1941 and became part of the Ponzán group. With her husband Josep Ester i Borràs and daughter Angelina she ran a house helping airmen on escape lines. After being arrested by the Gestapo, she was deported to Ravensbrück concentration camp in Germany, under the Nacht und Nebel directive. Nazi doctors performed medical experiments upon her without her consent. Bueno's work in the resistance movement was celebrated by the British, French and US governments.

== Early life ==
Bueno was born on 26 January 1915 in Moros, in Aragon. Her family moved to Berga when she was young. She found employment in a spinning mill where she met her husband Josep Ester Borràs, an anarchist from Lleida. Together they had one child.

== Resistance movement ==
After World War II started, Bueno joined the French Resistance in 1941 and became part of the Ponzán group. With her daughter Angelina, she ran a house in Banyuls-sur-Mer, in France, which hosted maquis and helped airmen flee France and return to England with the help of the Pat O'Leary Line, an escape line. After the house came to the attention of the Sicherheitspolizei, Bueno was arrested by the Gestapo in February 1943. Her husband was also arrested in October 1943. He was imprisoned in Toulouse and then Paris, where he was tortured. Bueno was first imprisoned in Toulouse then in May 1944 was deported to Ravensbrück concentration camp in Germany, under the Nacht und Nebel directive, which was designed to punish political prisoners. At Ravensbrück, Nazi doctors performed medical experiments upon her without her consent. In an experiment performed under gynecologist Carl Clauberg, she was injected via the vagina with a caustic yellow liquid which burnt her skin as it dripped on her legs. Other women died from the procedure.

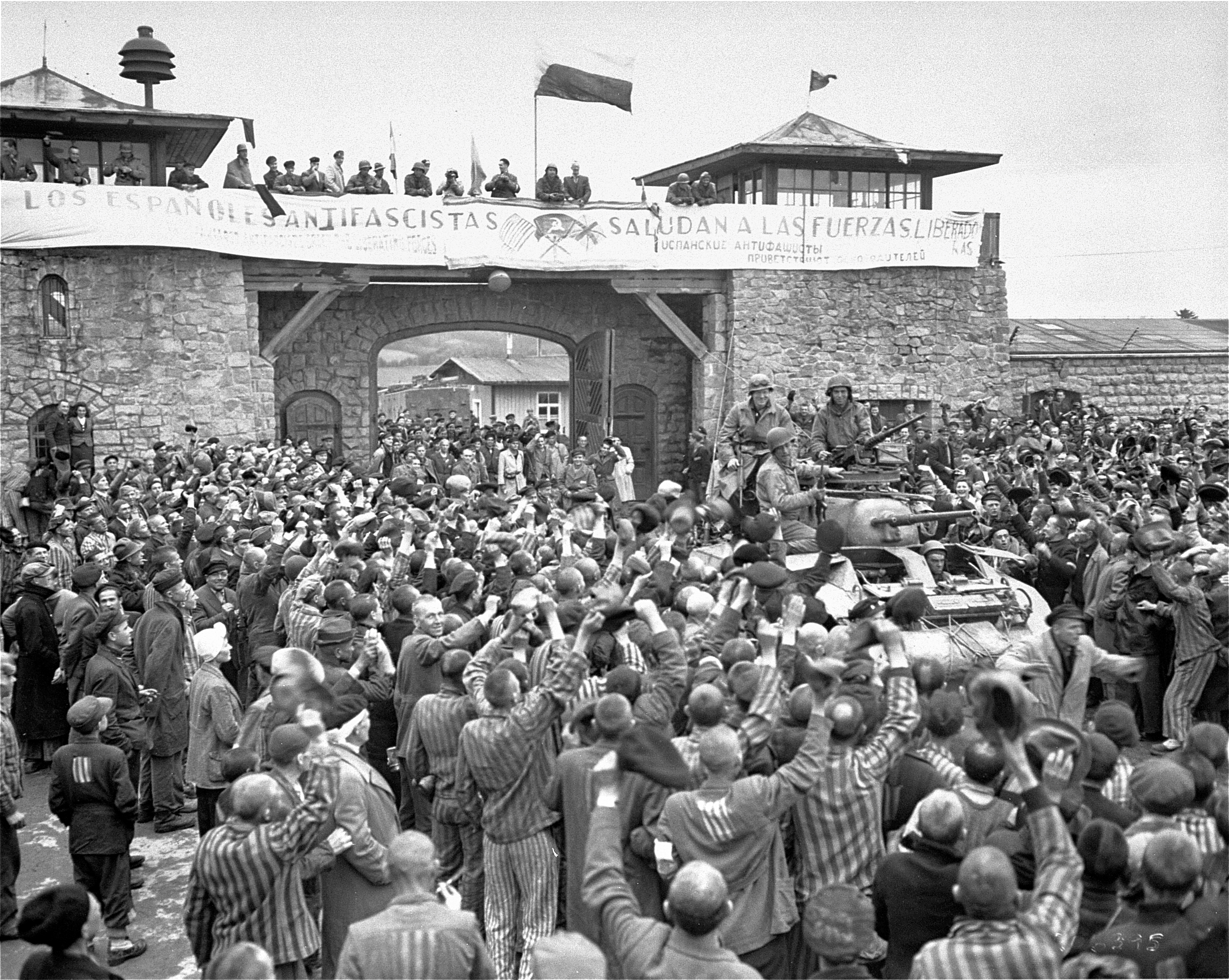
The liberation of Mauthausen concentration camp in May 1945. The banner reads "Spanish anti-fascists salute the liberating forces"

She was moved to Mauthausen concentration camp in March 1945, where she was reunited with her husband and freed in May 1945. The wartime torture meant that Bueno was unable to bear any more children and left her in bad health. She later parted from her husband because he wanted to expose the truth about the experiments and she wanted to forget about them. She died in Toulouse in 1979.

== Legacy ==
Bueno's work in the resistance movement was celebrated by the British, French and US governments. The book Noche y niebla en los campos nazis, written by Mónica G. Álvarez, records the internment experiences of Bueno and ten other women, including Elisa Garrido and Lise London. A mural in Berga commemorates Bueno's life.
