= Generosa Cortina Roig =

Spanish resistant and concentration camps survivor

Generosa Cortina Roig (born on April 19, 1910, in Son, Alt Àneu, Pallars Sobirà - died on December 30, 1987 in Toulouse), was a significant figure in the French Resistance during World War II and concentration camps survivor.

== Biography ==
=== Early life ===
Generosa Cortina Roig was born on April 19, 1910, in Son, Alt Àneu, Pallars Sobirà. She was the daughter of Bàrbara and Antoni Jaume from the Moreu household. In 1925, she immigrated to France as economic immigrant, settling in Granges-sur-Lot, where one of her sisters was already living.

There, she met Jaume Soldevila Pich, originally from Escart, whom she married in 1931. The couple later moved to Toulouse, where Jaume worked as a mechanic.

=== During World War II ===
During World War II, Generosa Cortina and her husband, became actively involved in the Resistance. They participated in both the Françoise escape network and the Belgian intelligence network Jean. In 1943, along with Jaume Soldevila's brothers, they established the SOL line (named after their family name, "Soldevila"), which connected Toulouse to Barcelona. In this effort, Cortina played a crucial role by storing and transmitting information and parcels between Resistance contacts.

On April 13, 1944, the arrest of a Belgian agent by the German army led to the downfall of the SOL line. On April 15, Cortina was arrested by the Gestapo, tortured, and imprisoned. She was first imprisoned Caffarelli barracks, then transferred to Saint-Michel prison in Toulouse. On July 3, she was forced onto the "phantom train" and deported to the Dachau concentration camp. The train left Toulouse on 3 July 1944 with 750 deportees, 221 of whom were Spanish, and finally reached Dachau on 28 August 1944, 54 days after its departure. There, she was assigned prisoner number 93.882. On 9 September 1944, Cortina was deported and interned in the Ravensbrück concentration camp, in Barracks 22. There, she was registered again, this time with serial number 65,475, and was forced to work in the Nazi war industry, a kommando in Oberschöneweide. She worked there with Conchita Grangé Beleta, Elvira Ibarz and María Ferrer. On April 14 1945, she was transferred to the Köpernick kommando, where she worked digging trenches in the Sachsenhausen concentration camp.

Between April 19 and 21, 1945, as Allied troops approached, the SS initiated a forced march of prisoners, known as a death march. Those unable to keep pace were executed. Cortina, weakened by months of starvation and labor, struggled to continue, but was aided by two fellow Spanish prisoners. One night, as the SS executed prisoners they encountered, Cortina, along with a small group of others, hid beneath a tree and avoided detection. "Out of the 85 women who left the camp, only 22 of us were left," she later recounted. The surviving group encountered Soviet forces, who provided initial aid. Later, American forces assisted in their return to France via the Netherlands, Brussels, and Lille.

=== Post-war life ===
She was eventually repatriated to Toulouse, where she reunited with her husband. She remained there for the rest of her life and opened a restaurant.

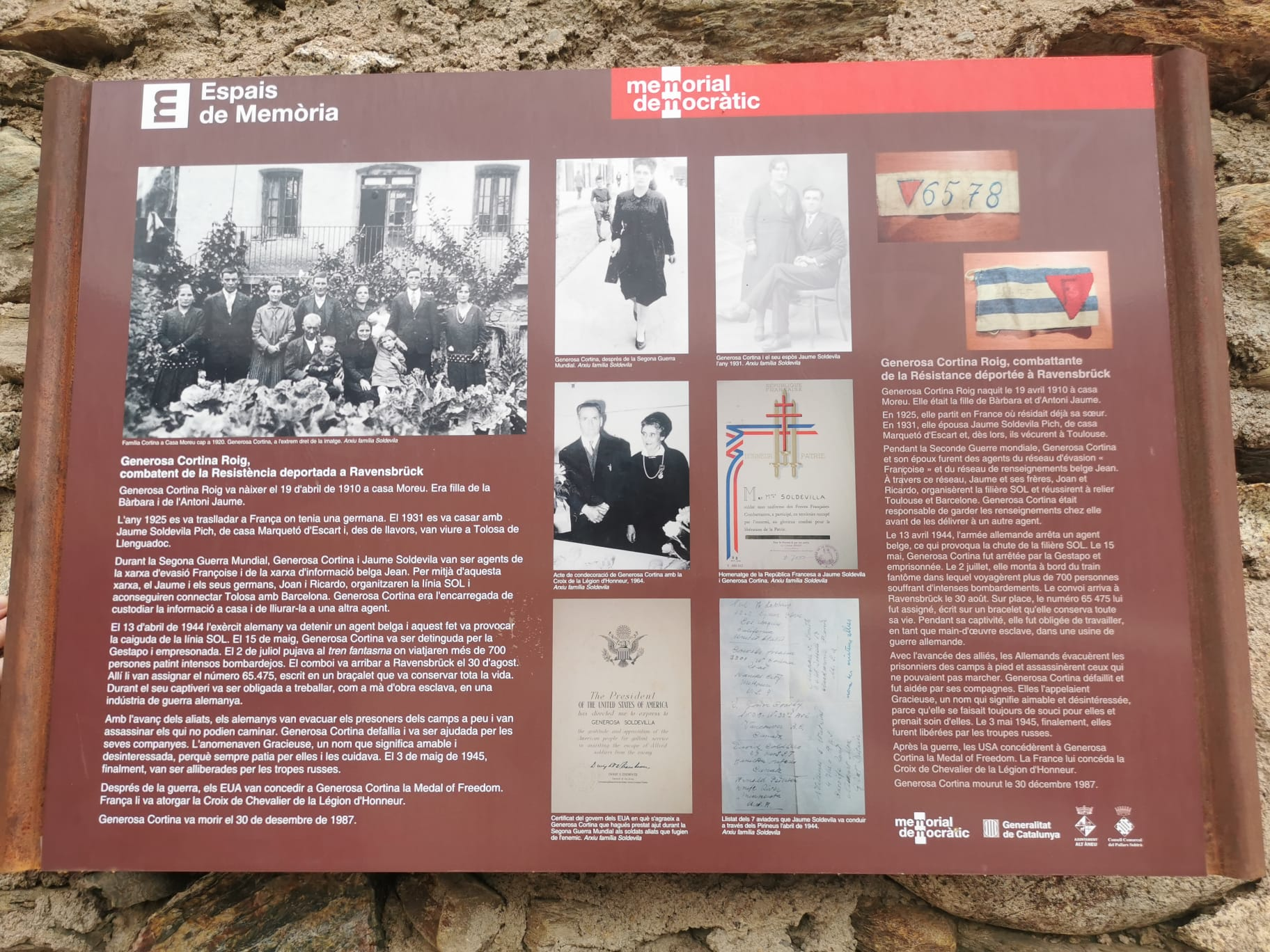
Plaque.

=== Death ===
Generosa Cortina Roig died on December 30, 1987, in Toulouse.

== Legacy ==
In 1947, the United States awarded both her and her husband the Medal of Freedom. In 1962, France named her a Chevalier of the Légion d’Honneur.

In 2020, a plaque was placed in front of her birthplace in Son as part of the Memory Spaces Network.
