= Tertsch =

Tertsch is a surname. Notable people with the surname include:

- Ekkehard Tertsch (1906–1989), Spanish-Austrian journalist
- Hermann Tertsch (born 1958), Spanish politician
