= Mélanie Berger-Volle =

Austrian-born French Resistance fighter during World War II (1921–2026)

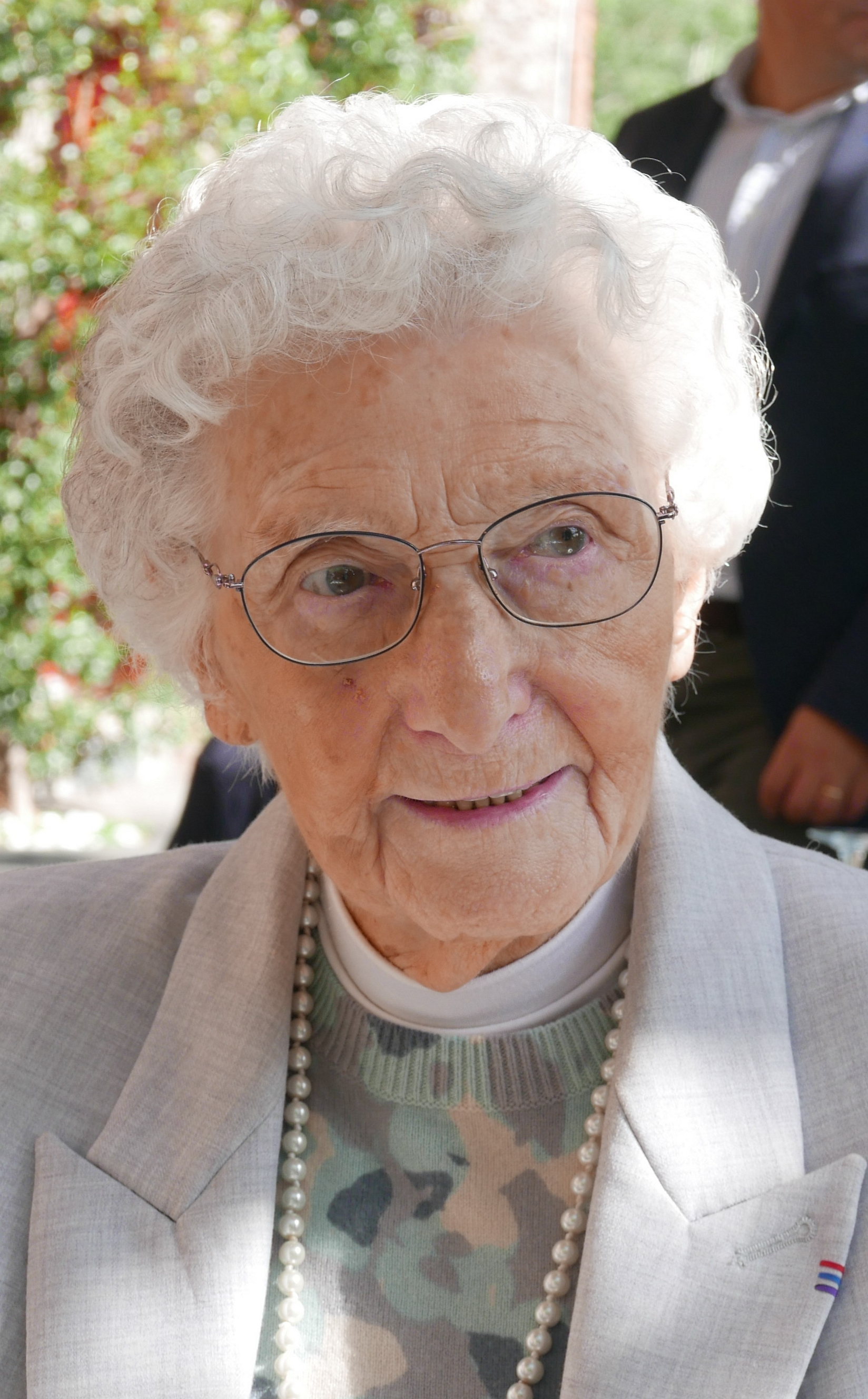
- Mélanie Berger-Volle in 2022
- Born: Mélanie Berger; 8 October 1921; Vienna, Austria
- Died: 21 October 2026 (aged 105); Saint-Étienne, France
- Known for: Resistance fighter during World War II

Mélanie Berger-Volle (8 October 1921 – 21 October 2026) was an Austrian-born French French Resistance fighter during World War II, and an activist against Austrofascism.

== Biography ==
Mélanie Berger was born on 8 October 1921 into a Jewish family in the Leopoldstadt area of Vienna. After completing her secondary education, she learned the corset-making trade as part of her dressmaking apprenticeship. She says she developed a political mindset from the age of 13. Politically socialized within the labour movement, she participated in illegal activities during the Austro-fascist era from the age of 15. During her schooling, she joined the Socialist Revolutionary Party of Austria (RSÖ). Members of this banned party met on a nudist beach in Lobau. She recounted in an interview that it was there, naked, that she began her first political discussions. Shortly afterward, she joined the internationalist and anti-Stalinist organization, the Revolutionary Communists of Austria (RKÖ).

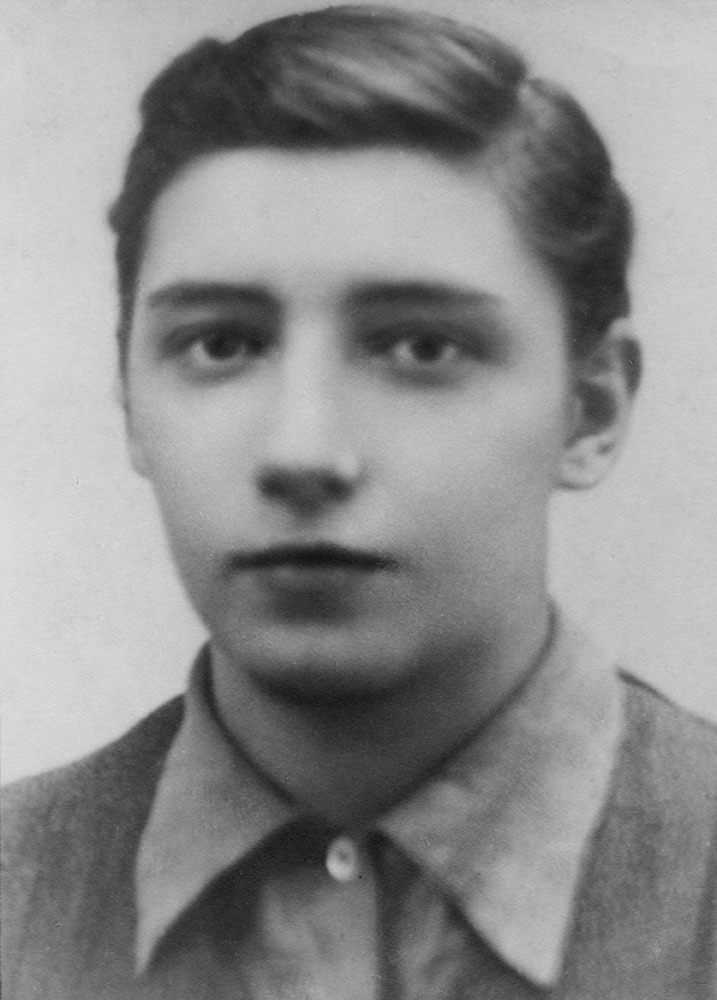
Berger in 1939, dressed and coiffed to appear as a man, around the time she crossed the Belgium-France border

In May 1938, threatened with imprisonment as a Jew and a communist after the Anschluss, she hitchhiked across Germany to reach Antwerp, Belgium, where she stayed illegally. She crossed into France disguised as a man in early 1939, with friends, among the cross-border workers. In Paris, she was initially protected by her name, which was both French and German, and even obtained a coveted residence permit. At the beginning of the Second World War, however, she was prosecuted like other anti-fascists as a foreign enemy and transferred to Clermont-Ferrand. From there, she was to be taken by train to be interned at the Gurs internment camp. But she managed to escape imprisonment and found work as a maid for a lawyer. This allowed her to temporarily avoid detention.

While her friends were being held at Les Milles, she managed to maintain the RKÖ group's links with its bases in Antwerp, Les Milles, London, Zurich and New York. To escape the Wehrmacht, she went to Montauban in the south of France. She distributed anti-Hitler leaflets to German soldiers.

On 26 January 1942, she was arrested by the Toulouse police at 3 Quai Docteur-Laffargue and taken to the Montauban police station where she was interrogated, beaten and then transferred to Saint-Michel prison in Toulouse. On 18 December 1942, she was sentenced by the Toulouse Court of Appeal to 15 years of hard labour and a 20-year banishment for "communist and anarchist activities" and for distributing, for propaganda purposes, leaflets likely to harm the national interest. After her trial, she was transferred to the Baumettes Prison in Marseille, where she was incarcerated with three other women, Jeanne Katzenstein, Madeleine Goetzmann and Margot Usclat. The situation of "Anna" or "Nelly", Mélanie Berger's pseudonyms in the Resistance, became dangerous because the Gestapo had been searching for political prisoners in Vichy regime prisons since 1943. After being held in a prison hospital for treatment of acute jaundice, she was freed in a dramatic operation by members of her group, joined by a Wehrmacht soldier who wanted to desert and was persuaded to participate. They came to get her for questioning, using forged Gestapo papers. Mélanie Berger had previously been able to secretly explain from the hospital how she could be freed.

“We were an Austrian group, which also included Germans. We published texts in German that explained to soldiers what National Socialism was. It was certainly not an easy task because we lost many friends as a result, but we also gained new ones. Among them was a soldier who helped to come and get me from prison”.

– Interview in 2013 with Mélanie Berger-Volle.

Now free, she took refuge in Lyon to resume her fight, made contact with the French Resistance, and continued her involvement in the Resistance, with false papers and under various names. In 1944, she was arrested again in Paris just before the Libération.

At the end of World War II, she was living in Paris and became a French citizen in 1947. During a visit to her parents in Austria in the 1960s, she met the French journalist Lucien Volle, her future husband. Volle had been active in the Resistance and was known as "Captain Lulu" in the "Lafayette" resistance group in the Haute-Loire region. After living in Vienna for ten years, the couple returned to France in 1967, settling in Drancy.

Berger-Volle worked for the municipality of Drancy. She and her husband were involved in various associations of former resistance fighters, such as the ANACR (National Association of Former Resistance Fighters). Upon retirement, the couple moved to Haute-Loire and dedicated themselves to preserving the memory of the Resistance until the death of Lucien Volle on 4 August 2012. Despite her advanced age, she continued to give testimony in schools.

She received several honorary distinctions from the French Resistance as well as the Escapees' Medal; she was a Knight of the Academic Palms and of the National Order of Merit. For her tireless work of remembrance as a witness to her time, she was awarded the Legion of Honour on 13 July 2013 by President François Hollande. On 19 June 2015, Austrian Ambassador Ursula Plassnik presented her with the Golden Merit of the Republic of Austria, awarded by Austrian President Heinz Fischer, during a ceremony at the Austrian Embassy in Paris.

Berger-Volle lived in Saint-Étienne.

“Even as a child, I was a bit of a rebel. I couldn't understand why there were poor and rich people. I couldn't understand why some people thought they were superior because they had a different skin color or a different religion. I never wanted to understand it. I always wanted to change the world. I still want to change it, but unfortunately, I won't be able to anymore.”

– Interview in 2013 with Mélanie Berger-Volle.

Berger-Volle died in Saint-Étienne on 22 October 2026, at the age of 105. Her funeral took place on 30 October 2026 at the cemetery in Brives-Charensac.

== Distinctions and honours ==
- Chevalier of the Légion d'honneur (2013)
- Chevalier de l'ordre national du Mérite
- Commandeur de l'ordre des Palmes académiques
- Médaille des évadés
- Croix du combattant volontaire de la guerre 1939-1945
- Croix du combattant volontaire de la Résistance
- Croix du combattant
- Médaille de la déportation pour faits de Résistance
- Golden Merit of the Republic of Austria (2015)

On 13 November 2002, Mélanie Berger-Volle was appointed to the rank of Knight in the National Order of Merit, as "member of the committee of the National Federation of Deportees and Internees, Resistance Fighters and Patriots; 40 years of professional, associative and civil and military service activities".

On 12 July 2013, Mélanie Berger-Volle was appointed to the rank of knight in the national order of the Legion of Honour, as an "interned resistance fighter; 72 years of service".

From 24 December 2025, she was also a Commander of the Order of Academic Palms.

== See also ==
=== Bibliography ===
- Cécile Denis (2021). La résistance allemande et autrichienne en France. D'après sa presse clandestine. L'histoire de trois réseaux germanophones actifs en France pendant la Seconde Guerre mondiale au travers de leurs journaux et de leurs tracts (in French). Paris: Éditions L'Harmattan. p. 318. ISBN 978-2-343-21680-5.
- Nils Klawitter (2024). Die kleine Sache Widerstand. Wie Melanie Berger den Nazis entkam (in German). Wien: Czernin Verlag. p. 160. ISBN 978-3-7076-0845-8.
- Nils Klawitter (2026). La petite main de la résistance. Comment Melanie Berger défia les nazis. Traduit de l'allemand et préfacé par Jean-Claude Mourlevat (in French). Paris: Éditions Robert Laffont. p. 240. ISBN 978-2-221-28784-2.
- Robert, Christian (2017). Histoires d'Auvergnats (in French). Champetières: éditions des monts d'Auvergne. p. 422. ISBN 978-2-36654-067-3.
