= Cirilo Rodríguez Journalism Award =

- Named for Cirilo Rodríguez
- Awarded for: Foreign correspondence
- Sponsored by: Segovia Press Association; Federation of Journalist Associations of Spain
- Location: Segovia
- Country: Spain
- Reward: €6,000
- First award: 1984

The Cirilo Rodríguez Journalism Award (Spanish: Premio de Periodismo Cirilo Rodríguez) is an award given annually by the Segovia Press Association (APS), in collaboration with the Federation of Journalist Associations of Spain (FAPE). It "is destined to publicly recognize the best work of a correspondent or special envoy of a Spanish media outlet abroad" during the preceding year, and the jury "can contemplate the trajectory of the candidate" throughout their professional career. The winner receives a prize of €6,000 and a glass trophy named Lente de la tierra (Lens of the Earth), made by the Real Fábrica de Cristales de La Granja.

Considered one of the most prestigious awards of its type in Spain, it was created in honor of the journalist Cirilo Rodríguez, and has been held every year since its creation in 1984. The jury includes the presidents of APS and FAPE, the director of Radio Segovia, and the previous year's winner. Journalists and communication companies are also part of the jury, and it is funded by public institutions of Segovia and its province. In recent years, winners have received an audience with the Prince or Princess of Asturias, and Queen Letizia has accepted the honorary presidency of the award.

== Winners ==
- 1984: Manu Leguineche
- 1985: Diego Carcedo
- 1986: Felipe Sahagún
- 1987: José Virgilio Colchero
- 1988: Javier Martín Domínguez
- 1989: Hermann Tertsch
- 1990: Beatriz Iraburu
- 1991: Juan Jesús Aznárez
- 1992: Ángela Rodicio and José Luis Márquez León (1992)
- 1993: Román Orozco
- 1994: Ferrán Sales
- 1995: Gervasio Sánchez
- 1996: Pilar Bonet
- 1997: Juan Fernández Elorriaga
- 1998: Vicente Romero Ramírez
- 1999: Evaristo Canete
- 2000: Fran Sevilla
- 2001: Ramón Lobo
- 2002: Juan Cierco
- 2003: Tomás Alcoverro
- 2004: Javier Espinosa Robles
- 2005: Enric González
- 2006: Rosa María Calaf
- 2007: Javier del Pino
- 2008: Joaquim Ibarz
- 2009: Soledad Gallego-Díaz
- 2010: Eugenio García Gascón
- 2011: Enrique Ibáñez
- 2012: Mònica Bernabé
- 2013: Marc Marginedas
- 2014: Íñigo Dominguez
- 2015: Juan Pedro Quiñonero
- 2016: Mónica García Prieto
- 2017: Cristina Sánchez
- 2018: Javier Martín
