= Jot Down =

Online and print cultural magazine in Spain

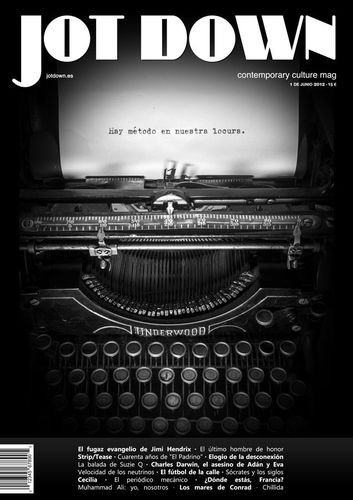
- Cover of the first print issue
- Editor-in-chief: Mar de Marchis
- Categories: Cultural magazine
- Frequency: Quarterly (print edition)
- Founder: Mar de Marchis; Ángel Fernández; Ricardo Jonás
- Founded: 2011
- First issue: 16 May 2011
- Country: Spain
- Based in: Barcelona
- Language: Spanish
- Website: Jot Down
- ISSN: 2254-5913

Jot Down is a cultural magazine based in Barcelona, Spain. The magazine was started as an online magazine, but has also published quarterly print editions. It describes itself as one of the representatives of slow journalism.

== History and profile ==
Jot Down was launched by a group of journalists and businesspeople led by Mar de Marchis, Ángel Fernández and Ricardo Jonás on 16 May 2011 as an online cultural magazine. As of 2017 Mar de Marchis was also the editor-in-chief.

The magazine features narrations and interviews using visuals, including photographs, illustrations and graphic humor. The early contributors of the magazine include Enric González, Fernando Savater and Félix de Azúa. From 2012 Jot Down published print editions on a quarterly basis. The print edition is published black and white and consists of 350 pages.

As of 2017 Jot Down had one million unique visitors and sold 10,000–15,000 copies of print edition.
