= Elisa Garrido García =

Aragonese anti-fascist militant

- Born: 14 June 1909; Magallón, Zaragoza, Aragon, Spain
- Died: 19 March 1990 (aged 80); Toulouse, Occitania, France
- Military career
- Allegiance: Republican faction French Resistance
- Service years: 1936-1945
- Rank: Lieutenant
- Nicknames: "La Mañica" and "Françoise"
- Units: Confederal militias Ponzán group
- Conflicts: Spanish Civil War; World War II

Elisa Garrido García, also known as La Mañica and Françoise, (1909-1990) was an Aragonese anti-fascist militant. She was a member of the Confederación Nacional del Trabajo (CNT) and fought against the nationalist faction in the Spanish Civil War and against the Nazi troops in France during World War II. She spent time in several prisons and three concentration camps, where she suffered mistreatment and torture. For her intervention in the world war, during which she blew up a German howitzer factory where she had been sent as a prisoner of war by the Germans, the French Republic awarded her the Legion of Honour and recognised her as a lieutenant in the French Resistance.

== Biography ==
Garrido was born in the town of Magallón in the province of Zaragoza, Aragon. Her parents were anarchist militants and members of the Confederación Nacional del Trabajo (CNT). She emigrated to Barcelona where she met Marino Ruiz de Angulo, who became her partner. After the Spanish coup of July 1936 and the outbreak of the Spanish Civil War, Garrido was mobilised as a militiawoman, joining the Ausias March barracks in Barcelona, from where she left for the Aragon front.

After the fall of the Republic, Garrido fled to France, settling with her partner in the city of Toulouse and joining the CNT's clandestine groups to help exiles. After the Nazi invasion of France, they both collaborated with the French Resistance, within the escape group organised by Francisco Ponzán, working as couriers and liaisons in the Hautes-Alpes department. It was there that she began to be known by her two nicknames, La mañica and Françoise.

In October 1943, she was arrested in Toulouse by the Gestapo, who were watching her because she was the one who brought food to Francisco Ponzán's prison every day and presumably was his main courier. The Gestapo interrogated her using different methods of torture in order to obtain information about the organisation of the resistance. Garrido kept silent and was kept in an incommunicado cell for three weeks. She was transferred to Saint Michel prison and from there to Paris prison and then to Compiègne prison, from where she was taken on 30 January 1944 to Ravensbrück concentration camp, where she arrived on 3 February of that year and was registered under the number 27219. In September of the same year, she was transferred to the Buchenwald camp in Leipzig to do forced labour for HASAG, who forced her to manufacture 7,000 shells a day in subhuman conditions. Garrido carried out various sabotage operations that even paralysed the plant and blew up part of it.

She returned to Ravensbrück, where she was placed in Ward 28, awaiting execution. She unloaded coal wagons and potatoes until, after a beating by guards, she was admitted to the infirmary with a broken arm. She entered a prisoner exchange organised by the Red Cross: she was taken to Frankfurt and from there to Denmark, then to Sweden and was released in Stockholm. Finally, she was transferred to Paris, where she remained until the 1950s. She returned to Spain with her partner, Marino, and they settled for a time in the town of Cortes de Navarra, where she ran a fish shop and her partner worked as a taxi driver. After a few years, the couple decided to return to France.

Elisa Garrido died in Toulouse on 19 March 1990.

== Recognition ==
The French Republic recognised her work during World War II, for having provoked the explosion of a German howitzer factory, and awarded her the Legion of Honour and the honorary rank of lieutenant in the French Resistance.

During the organisation of the Jornadas de Memoria Histórica de Magallón "Desenterrando el silencio", which took place in 2018, the researcher Juan Manuel Calvo Gascón, member of Amical de Mauthausen, made the first acknowledgement of Garrido. He communicated the identity of "la Mañica" or "Francoise" in the course of a round table in which he participated together with the journalists Ramón Lobo, Conchi Cejudo and Pilar Barranco, and the Valencian magistrate Joaquim Bosch.

On 29 June 2019, the Magallón Town Council named a street after her on the outskirts of the town. A few months later, in November of the same year, the Association of Relatives and Friends of those Murdered and Buried in Magallón (AFAAEM) and the Magallón Town Council, with the collaboration of the Zaragoza Provincial Council and the Cortes of Aragon, paid tribute to Garrido and held a colloquium with journalists such as Javier del Pino, Gervasio Sánchez, Ramón Lobo, Conchi Cejudo and Gonzalo Barros. Subsequently, another tribute was paid to her at the Fosa de Magallón, during a day of democratic memory in which the Manchega singer-songwriter Rozalén took part.

== Bibliography ==
- Suri, Manil; Núñez Targa, Mercè (2005). El carretó dels gossos. Una catalana a Ravensbrück (in Catalan). Edicions 62. ISBN 978-8429756449.
- Català, Neus (2015). De la resistencia y la deportación. 50 testimonios de mujeres españolas. Generalitat de Catalunya. ISBN 978-8439393436.
- Calvo, Juan Manuel (2019). Dentro de poco os podré abrazar. Supervivientes aragoneses de los campos nazis. Amical de Mauthausen. ISBN 978-84-09-09765-4.
