= Barbara Probst Solomon =

American journalist (1928–2019)

- Born: December 3, 1928; New York City, U.S.
- Died: September 1, 2019 (aged 90)
- Occupations: Journalist; essayist

Barbara Probst Solomon (December 3, 1928 – September 1, 2019) was an American author, essayist, and journalist. Her published works include two novels, two volumes of memoirs, and a book of collected essays. Solomon was the United States cultural correspondent for Spain's "newspaper-of-record", El País of Madrid. Solomon was awarded the 25th Francisco Cerecedo Prize by the Association of European Journalists in Spain. The prize, which comes with an award of $36,000, is the most prestigious journalism prize in that country, and Solomon was the first North American to receive it. She accepted the award from the future King of Spain Prince Felipe at a gala in Madrid.

In January 2008, Solomon was part of José Luis Rodríguez Zapatero's "dream team" of 14 international experts in Madrid, a team that included Professors Joseph Stiglitz, Jeremy Rifkin and Nicholas Stern. In 2007 Solomon received the United Nations/Women Together Award which pays tribute "to a group of women who share...a commitment to their work, and a devotion to making the world a better place.". She was a member of the graduate faculty of Sarah Lawrence College and a distinguished visiting professor at the Menéndez Pelayo International University in Spain.

== Biography ==
Barbara Kurke Probst was born in New York City on Dec. 3, 1928. Her father, J. Anthony Probst, was Woodrow Wilson's youngest campaign manager before he served in the United States Army during World War I. He was gassed in the trenches while stationed in France as a private, resulting in a three-year stay in an American army hospital there. Probst's cousin, the Austrian writer Joseph Roth, was a soldier serving on the German/Austrian side. Probst returned to New York after the war to become a successful lawyer. Later he bought the Self Winding Clock Company from Standard Oil, which was affiliated with Western Union.

Her mother, Frances Kurke Probst, worked as a middy blouse model during World War I; after her marriage she attended Columbia University and became an artist. She was a student of Julio de Diego. Her art and work were much influenced by that of Kurt Schwitters.

Barbara Probst graduated from the Dalton School in New York City. After World War II she bypassed college in America to go to Europe. She studied at the Sorbonne in France. In 1948, she and Barbara Mailer (the sister of Norman Mailer) aided Paco Benet, brother of the Madrid novelist Juan Benet, in the rescue of two Spanish students being held near Madrid, where they were used as slave labor to build Francisco Franco's future tomb, The Valley of the Fallen/Valle de los Caídos. Solomon and Paco Benet spent five years together, mainly in Paris, where they edited the resistance magazine Peninsula together.

When she returned to New York, she enrolled in the School of General Studies at Columbia University, where she received her BS in Spanish. In 1952, she married Harold Solomon.

== Writing ==
Solomon was a regular correspondent for The Huffington Post.

Solomon mooted the idea that F. S. Fitzgerald based his book The Great Gatsby on his time with his new wife Zelda in Westport, Connecticut, rather than Long Island as is commonly accepted. This theory has been turned into a film entitled Gatsby in Connecticut.

== Books ==
Solomon's books included the novel The Beat of Life (1969, 2nd edition 1999, Great Marsh Press) and her memoir Arriving Where We Started (1972; revised edition 1999), which won the Pablo Antonio de Olavide prize in Barcelona "for being the best, most literary account of the intellectual resistance to Franco."

Carolyn See of The New York Times, in her review of Solomon's 1983 Short Flights, said, "This is a remarkable memoir." Solomon's other work included the essay collection Horse-Trading and Ecstasy (1989), the novel Smart Hearts in the City (1992) and the American edition of Operation Ogro: The Execution of Admiral Luis Carrero Blanco (Quadrangle, 1975) Operación Ogro.

Solomon completed a new novel, The King of Paris, about Vichy France; the first chapter appeared in The Reading Room: Writing of the Moment/7-Summer 2007.

Her essays and articles appeared in The New York Times, The New York Review of Books, The Wall Street Journal, The [Huffington Post], The New Yorker, New York Sun, Slate, The Washington Post, The Los Angeles Times, Harpers, Doubletake, Vogue, The New Republic, Cambio 16, Dissent, Partisan Review, L'infini (Gallimard), L'Evenement du Jeudi and Letras Libres.

Stanley Crouch, writing in The All-American Skin Game, comments, "Barbara Probst Solomon's famous essay about the posthumous, high-handed editing down of The Garden of Eden mightily shook Scribner's voodoo Hemingway industry when it was published in a 1987 issue of The New Republic. That investigative essay impressed the way first-class detective work always does, supplying the pleasure of witnessing the covers pulled off a serious fraud. But her 1992 novel, Smart Hearts in the City, is a banana peel that can slide us out of our customary disappointment with the short range and the low ambition of contemporary American fiction....The mulatto textures of Katy Becker's world and the many, many ways in which Barbara Probst Solomon has elevated her epic sense of Americana into literature, subtle to raw, is an achievement that should take a lasting place in the writing about the riddle of the human spirit as expressed within the context of this polyglot nation's bittersweet and stinking little secrets."

== Documentary film ==
The film When the War Was Over, her memoir-documentary based on Arriving Where We Started, which premiered in 1999 on PBS and on Canal Plus in Europe, won the Lancelot Law Whyte Award at Boston University for its contribution to modern culture.

== Awards and activism ==
In 2002 she started the literary journal The Reading Room: Writing of the Moment, with the founding Board of Larry Rivers, Norman Mailer, Saul Bellow and Donald Maggin, and continues to serve as publisher and editor-in-chief. The Reading Room's goal is to feature work by both well-known and emerging writers.

In 2005 Solomon became the first North American and second woman to receive the Premio Antonio de Sancha awarded annually by the Association of Madrid Editors to a person distinguished for upholding universal cultural and literary values. Previous recipients include Jack Lang, former French Minister of Culture; Julio María Sanguinetti Coirolo, past President of Uruguay; actress Nuria Espert; Federico Mayor Zaragoza, former director general of UNESCO; and the Prix Goncourt winner Amin Maalouf.

In May 2007, Solomon received the United Nations/Women Together Award, which honors women who "share a dedication to stand out in their individual activities, a commitment to their work, and a devotion to making the world a better place. Their efforts have made them symbols, icons and examples to the women of this century, giving hope for the future and creating a legacy for the next generations." In addition to Solomon, the 2007 awardees included artist Louise Bourgeois, Spanish television journalist Rosa Maria Calaf, Iranian lawyer Shirin Ebadi, Spanish economist Isabel Estape, theatrical and television producer Francine LeFrak, Wangari Maathal, the first African woman to be awarded the Nobel Prize, and Vasundhara Raje, the first woman Chief Minister of the State of Rajasthan.

== Family life ==
Solomon was married to University of Southern California law professor Harold W. Solomon, who died in 1967 at the age of 44. She had two daughters, Carla Solomon Magliocco and Maria Solomon, and four grandchildren. She died at her Manhattan home on September 1, 2019, at the age of 90.
