= Joaquim Ibarz =

Spanish journalist (1943–2011)

- Born: Joaquim Ibarz Melet; 25 May 1943; Zaidín (Saidí), Huesca, Spain
- Died: 12 March 2011 (aged 67); Barcelona, Spain
- Occupation: Journalist
- Known for: Coverage of Latin America

Joaquim Ibarz Melet (25 May 1943 – 12 March 2011) was a Spanish journalist who for 28 years was a Latin America correspondent for the Barcelona newspaper La Vanguardia. He was widely recognized by his journalistic colleagues and others as an expert on Latin American affairs and as an authoritative and witty commentator upon them. El País correspondent Juan Jesús Aznárez described Ibarz as "the journalist who knows the most about Latin America."

Also described as "a defender of democracy and a staunch critic of the populist and authoritarian regimes in Latin America," Ibarz was present at the 1992 Fujimori coup in Peru, the 1994 Zapatista uprising in Chiapas, and other major events in modern Latin American history. In 1991, owing to his coverage of the regime of Fidel Castro, he became the first Spaniard to be expelled from Cuba. He later recalled that after the fall of the Soviet Union, Cubans "were so desperate that they were eating the island's cats," and said that no story he had ever written had "raised such a ruckus" as the 1992 article in which he "confirmed the sad fate of Cuban cats" by asking 300 or so Cubans if they had eaten cat. "About a third said yes." In addition to being expelled from Cuba, he was accused by Hugo Chávez of being "responsible for the political agitations against the Bolivarian caudillo."

== Early life and education ==
Ibarz was born 25 May 1943 in Zaidín (Saidí), Huesca, Spain. He received a journalism degree from the University of Navarra.

== Career ==
Ibarz began his career with the daily El Noticiero. In 1970 he started working in Barcelona for the newspaper Tele Expres, for which he covered the conflict in the Sahara. He later worked as executive director of the magazine Ser Padres ("Being Parents") and as assistant director of the weekly Primera Plana ("Close-up"). He also worked for the sports publication Barca in 1971, for the Zaragoza weekly Andalán in 1977-78, and for the Valles Expres. He moved to Mexico City in 1982 to serve as La Vanguardia's correspondent there, a position he held until his death. In recent years he had also maintained a blog, "Diario de América Latina", on La Vanguardia's website. In announcing that he had been awarded a 2010 Maria Moors Cabot prize, the School of Journalism at Columbia University praised the blog's "keen analysis, in-depth reporting and tough and witty prose," saying that it had "become a must-read for journalists and opinion makers in the region."

For all his prolificity, Ibarz never wrote a book. "Friends have told me for years that I should write a book about my experiences," he said near the end of his life. "But I was always so busy that I never did, although I had the title down: There's no fixing this." Still, he added that "Lula's successful government in Brazil, Chile's institutional strength, Santos' victory in Colombia, and Funes' prudence in El Salvador, augur better days for the region."

== Views and opinions ==
Ibarz's wry perspective on Latin America was reflected in some of his comments on receiving the Maria Moors Cabot Prize: "I've been running around this part of the world for 28 years and I can't complain. I've never lacked for news. I remember a day in 1992 after a group of Spanish correspondents and I had witnessed the last of El Salvador's guerrillas destroy their weapons. We talked about the end of the guerrilla war in the bloodiest region of the Americas. With the end of the conflict, my colleagues were uncertain about their future. I told them: 'God is generous. He will provide us with good new material for our stories.' God apparently was listening. Hours later, we were waken up with news of an unprecedented coup attempt in Venezuela. The day that the civil wars in the Americas ended, Hugo Chávez didn't allow even five hours of peace and quiet to the continent."

== Personal life and professional reputation ==
Ibarz, who never married, was known to colleagues and friends as "Quim." He was a light sleeper, needing only four or five hours a night. A month before his death he was described by the historian Enrique Krauze as "the best witness of contemporary life in Mexico during the past three decades." El País correspondent Juan Jesús Aznárez said "I will never forget his loyalty to his friends, his unwavering attachment to journalism, and an eagerness and curiosity that did not dwindle one iota until his last day." His colleague Lluís Foix called him "one of the greats of international journalism...the correspondent who has known for the longest time, and known best, the changing political scene of Latin America over forty years."

Fifteen of Ibarz's colleagues signed their names to a memoir for the Spanish newspaper ABC which read, in part, "He had friends in every city, and that's saying something. He loved his friends, and loved to have them near him, always." On his death La Vanguardia published a set of brief tributes by "his enormous family of friends." Carmen de Carlos of ABC said "Quim was a book you could read to learn and know about Latin America." Javier Sandomingo, Spanish ambassador to Peru, said that "Joaquín...always gave me the benefit of his encyclopedic knowledge of the region" and praised his "commitment to the fight" against the abettors of tyranny in politics and the press. José de Córdoba of The Wall Street Journal said Ibarz was "a model" who "lived for journalism," was "without fear," and loved life. Manuel M. Cascante of ABC praised his collegial generosity and called him "the master." José Vales of El Universal called him "the best colleague of my long career and...a brother." Juan Restrepo, formerly of TVE, said he possessed "a professional dedication I have rarely encountered in this job." Pablo Biffi, an editor at the Buenos Aires newspaper Clarín, described Ibarz as "a 'journalistic animal,' with an admirable and unmatched capacity for work." Mexican diplomat David Nájera called him a "gentlemanly witness to history."

Journalist Roger Bartra, in a memoir of Ibarz, noted that "Joaquim began his work in Mexico" at a time when "a process of democratic transition" was underway in much of Latin America and that Ibarz "asked me insistently" why such a transition wasn't beginning in Mexico. "The answer could be found in his brilliant journalism." Journalist Fran Sevilla, in a posthumous tribute addressed to Ibarz, said: "From your beloved Mexico to your adored Lima, from Quito to Managua, from turbulent Caracas to violent Bogotá or San Salvador or Guatemala, from the arrested Asunción to the devastated Port au Prínce, in the rubble of the Hotel Villa Creole, you were always there, writing history, living it, narrating it in your indispensable chronicles in La Vanguardia." A Peruvian colleague wrote: "We Latin Americans have been greatly fortunate that Joaquín Ibarz Melet...arrived in Mexico one day in 1982 as the correspondent of La Vanguardia." A Columbia University student wrote after Ibarz's death that his "passion and love for the region (not to mention his sense of humor) was palpable" to the students who met him when he came to Columbia to receive his Cabot prize.

== Honors and awards ==
In 1993 Ibarz was presented with the International Press Center Prize, awarded in Madrid for the best work by Spanish journalists based abroad. In 2009 he won the Cirilo Rodríguez Journalism Award. And in 2010 he became the first European to receive the Maria Moors Cabot prize from the Columbia University Graduate School of Journalism, which is awarded for journalism about the Americas. In announcing the award, Columbia University said that Ibarz had produced "some of the best-informed and clear-eyed writing of anyone in the hemisphere" and that he "still approaches his job with the contagious enthusiasm of a cub reporter."

The Columbia University statement noted further that while covering the Haitian earthquake, Ibarz had "darted through Port-au-Prince's rubble-filled streets on the back of a motorcycle. Covering a referendum a few years ago in Venezuela, Ibarz roamed the streets of Caracas for hours seeking a lead. He finally found it when he stumbled on a slowly deflating, two-story balloon in the shape of Hugo Chávez in front of the presidential palace....Ibarz has always been the first to ask uncomfortable questions and demand difficult answers of those in power, regardless of political fashion or persuasion." The prize statement concluded that "Like few others, Ibarz lives for journalism. His generosity, professionalism, and hard work set an example today for his colleagues." The Cabot ceremony occurred while Ibarz's cancer was in remission and a Columbia University student who met him at the time described him as making "a valiant effort to travel to New York for the Cabot gala."

== Death ==
Ibarz died of a brain tumor after a six-month illness. He was diagnosed with his brain tumor in Mexico City the summer before his death. Two months before his death he returned from Mexico City to Spain, where he moved back to his family home in Zaidín and received medical treatment in Barcelona. After his death, the president of Mexico, Felipe Calderón, called it "a sad day for Hispanic journalism." Ibarz was survived by a number of family members, of whom La Vanguardia singled out his niece Mercè as the chief mourner. In April 2011, Ibarz received a posthumous tribute in the form of a ceremony held at the Cultural Center of Spain in Mexico City. It was attended by many of his colleagues who gave speeches recalling their experiences with Ibarz over the years.

After his death, the president of Mexico, Felipe Calderón, called it "a sad day for Hispanic journalism." Ibarz was survived by a number of family members, of whom La Vanguardia singled out his niece Mercè as the chief mourner. In April 2011, Ibarz received a posthumous tribute in the form of a ceremony held at the Cultural Center of Spain in Mexico City. It was attended by many of his colleagues who gave speeches recalling their experiences with Ibarz over the years.

== "La Casa de Usted" ==
During his decades of travels around Latin America, Ibarz collected over 1000 cultural items that he wanted to display in a museum located in Zaidín that he planned to call "La Casa de Usted." At the time of his death this project was already underway and all the materials had been transported to Zaidín. He mentioned the museum at the end of his Cabot Prize speech, referring to it as "my personal Iberoamerican project. In my almost three decades knocking about Latin America, I've let myself be seduced by the richness of the continent's popular art. I have visited astonishing markets in all of our countries. I have put together a collection that, among other things, has more than 400 masks and 150 sombreros. It's probable that my collection has more huipiles – embroidered cotton dresses – than Nobel Prize winner Rigoberta Menchú closet." The museum, he said, was "my way of thanking a continent that has taught me so much and where I have had so many happy times."
