= Mònica Bernabé =

Spanish journalist (born 1972)

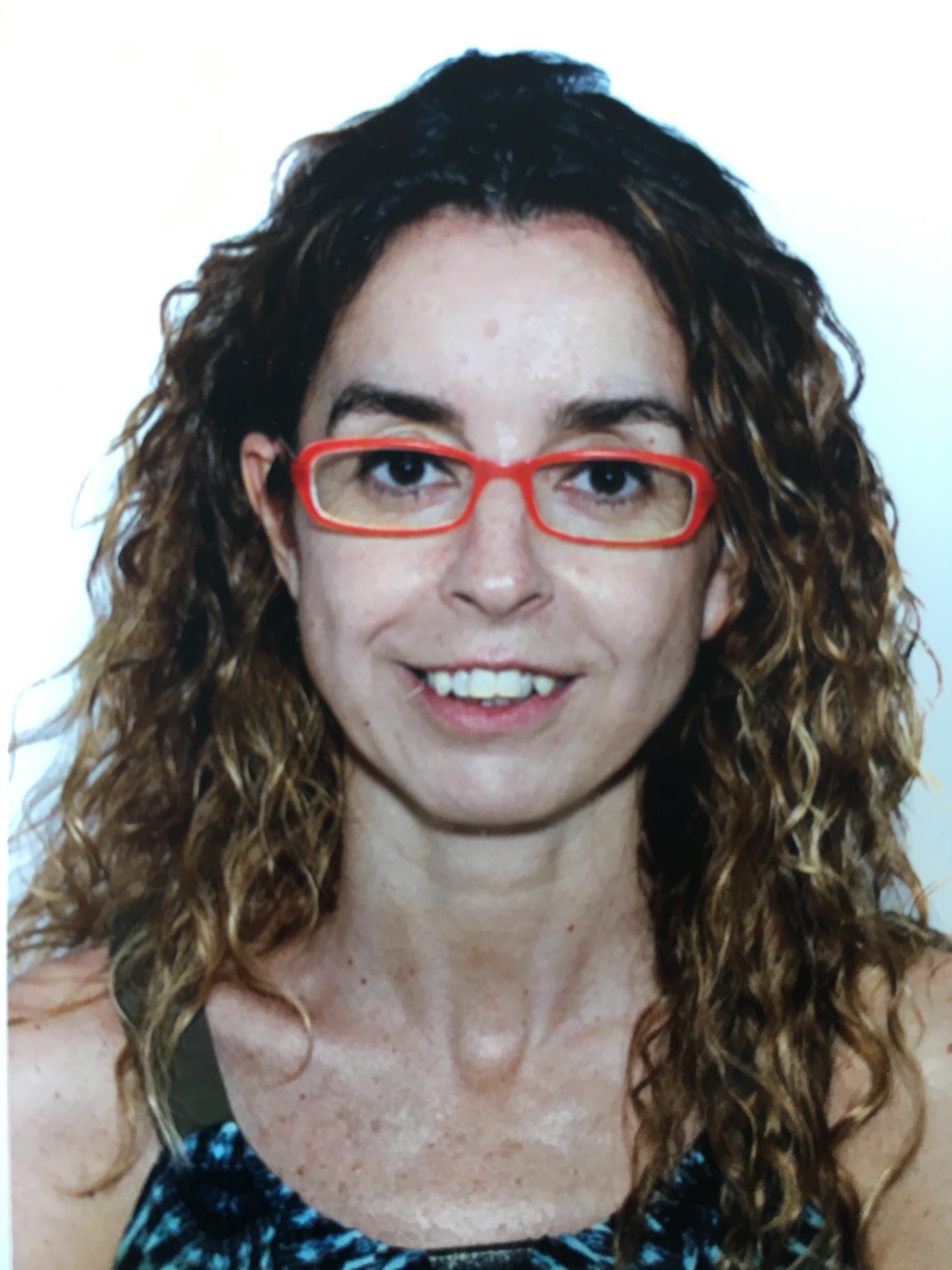
- Born: Mònica Bernabé Fernández; December 1972 (age 53); Barcelona, Spain
- Education: Autonomous University of Barcelona
- Occupation: Journalist

Mònica Bernabé Fernández (born December 1972) is a Spanish journalist known for her work as a correspondent in Afghanistan, where she lived for nearly eight years.

== Biography ==
Mònica Bernabé studied at the Autonomous University of Barcelona. In 2000, after her first trip to Afghanistan and Peshawar, she founded the Association for Human Rights in Afghanistan (Asociación por los Derechos Humanos en Afganistán; ASDHA), an NGO that supports Afghan women. She was the president for 16 years, until its dissolution. Over seven years, she traveled to Afghanistan every year, until mid-2007 when she settled there, corresponding for various media outlets, including the newspaper El Mundo, Radio Nacional de España (RNE), Ràdio Associació de Catalunya 1 (RAC 1), Canal Sur, and the Spanish service of Deutsche Welle. She lived in Afghanistan until 2014.

In 2015 she moved to Rome to take over as correspondent for El Mundo in the Italian capital. In May 2017 she joined the newspaper Ara as head of the International section.

== Awards ==
- 2010 Julio Anguita Parrado Prize for journalism
- 2011 Proteus Prize in the field of culture and communication
- 2013 29th Cirilo Rodríguez Journalism Award
- 2013 Human Rights Award from the General Council of Spanish Lawyers

== Books ==
- Afganistán, crónica de una ficción. Debate Publisher (2012)
- Mujeres. Afganistán, Blume Publisher (2014), jointly with Gervasio Sánchez. Collection of photographs and testimonies of almost 250 Afghan women explaining their situation in the country.

== Exhibition ==
- Dones. Women. Afganistán. Traveling exhibition, together with Gervasio Sánchez, which has been seen in various places throughout Catalonia and Spain. Based on the book of the same name.

== Documentary ==
- Vestida de negre. Documentary about Afghanistan through the testimony of journalist Mònica Bernabé, directed by Josep Morell. Produced by TV3 and La Quimera.
