= Ángela Rodicio =

- Born: María Ángeles Rodríguez González; March 6, 1963 (age 63); San Cristóbal of Regodeigón, Ribadavia, Spain
- Occupation: Journalist
- Years active: 1989–present
- Partner: Luis Carlos García-Revenga

María Ángeles Rodríguez González (born 6 March 1963 in Ribadavia, Spain), known as Ángela Rodicio, is a Foreign Affairs reporter for the Spanish public Television (TVE) program Informe Semanal.

== Life and work ==
Ángela Rodicio graduated with a degree in Journalism by the Complutense University of Madrid. She has worked for Spanish newspapers like Diario 16, El Independiente, Faro de Vigo, La Voz de Galicia, CNN and BBC. In addition, she took specialization courses at international universities, such as Fordham University of New York City.

In 1988 she covered Middle East, she entered in TVE in 1989, and she also worked for Informe Semanal. She covered the Gulf War in 1990.

In 1992 she became the correspondent in Central and Eastern Europe, but she had her office in Budapest. She covered the dissolution of the Soviet Union and Bosnian War until 1996 and she spent a long time in Sarajevo. During that year she opened the first correspondence office in Jerusalem.

She has been the author and scriptwriter of the documentary In the Name of Ala. In one hour she takes a look at the Islam radicalism and how believers are able to immolate themselves in the name of their god. The documentary was awarded with the golden nymph in the Monte-Carlo Television Festival in 2002.

She also worked in newspapers such as Diario 16 and El Independiente, and she collaborated in international journals such as Limes.

== Other books ==
=== The war without fronts (1998) ===
Ending Garden (2012) (Spanish: El jardín del fin. Un viaje por el Irán de ayer y hoy) is a trip through the history, culture and politics of Iran. The Ending Garden, in the outskirts of Kashan, is the best conserved space of all ancient Persian Gardens. This fact serves Ángela Rodicio to explain why this place contains the principles and the historic essence of Iran. The reporter places the actual problems of Iran in the Russian and English colonial influence over the territory in the early 20th century, travelling through the popular revolts of 2009 and Ahmadinejad's Coup d'état.

In 2005 he wrote Acabar con el personaje in which she explains her dismissed in TVE.

== Acknowledgements ==
Ángela Rodicio has received many prizes in recognition of her work as a correspondent.

In 1992, she won the Cirilo Rodríguez Journalism Award for best Spanish correspondent abroad. This award is dedicated to all those reporters who work in foreign parts.

The same year, Rodicio also won the Víctor de la Serna journalism prize granted by the Madrid Press Association (Asociación de la Prensa de Madrid). The prize was created in 1974, in honor of Víctor de la Serna y Espina. This award is given in recognition of the best journalistic labor during the year.

Ten years later, in 2002, Ángela Rodicio received the prize from the Association of Foreign Journalists in Spain (Asociación de Periodistas Extranjeros en España) for best correspondent.

In November 2011, the International prize María Grazia Cutuli of journalism, in its seventh edition, was granted, in the category of Foreign Press, to Ángela Rodicio. The gala is celebrated in Catania, the Sicilian city where María Grazia Cutuli was born. The prize is dedicated to Cutuli, journalist from Il Corriere della Sera who lost her life in Afghanistan in 2001 along with other three journalists. According to the organization of the award, they granted it to Rodicio because of "the energy, the pride, the passion and the modesty of the professional of race who refuses to be tamed" and who "is a clear example of the most authentic figure of the special correspondent."
