= Agustín Remiro =

Spanish anarchist (1904–1942)

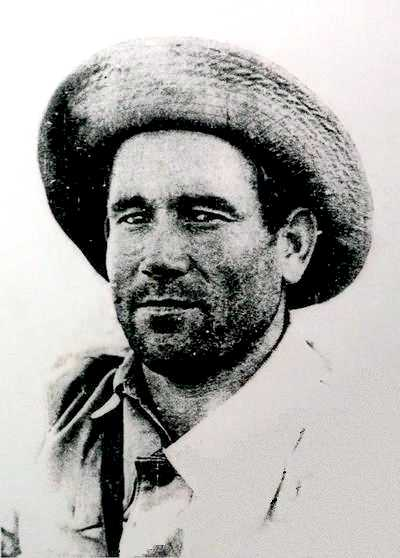
- Remiro in 1938
- Born: Agustín Remiro Manero; 28 August 1904; Epila, Aragon, Spain
- Died: 21 June 1942 (aged 37); Madrid, Spain
- Cause of death: Execution by shooting
- Spouse: Francisca Rodríguez (m. 1933–1942)
- Children: 2
- Military career
- Allegiance: Kingdom of Spain (1925–1926); Spanish Republic (1936–1939); United Kingdom (1940–1941)
- Service: Spanish Army (1925–1926); Confederal militias (1936–1937); Popular Army of the Republic (1937–1939); Spanish Maquis (1939–1940); Secret Intelligence Services (1940–1941)
- Service years: 1925–1926; 1936–1941
- Nicknames: El Royo, El Mangón
- Units: Durruti Column (1936–1937); 62nd Mixed Brigade (1937–1939); Ponzán group (1939–1941)
- Conflicts: Rif War; Spanish Civil War; Battle of Belchit; Battle of Teruel; Aragon Offensive; Battle of the Segre; Catalonia Offensive; World War II

Agustín Remiro Manero (28 August 1904 – 21 June 1942) was a Spanish anarchist activist, a soldier during the Spanish Civil War and later foreign agent for MI6. Born in the small town of Epila, he became an anarchist at a young age and engaged in trade union organising for the National Confederation of Labour (CNT). After fighting in the Rif War, he organised clandestine affinity groups in his home town to resist the dictatorship of Primo de Rivera. During the years of the Second Spanish Republic, he led strike actions and participated in the anarchist insurrection of December 1933.

Following the outbreak of the civil war, he fought as a guerrilla for the Durruti Column and later joined the Popular Army of the Republic as a regular soldier. He fought on the Aragon front throughout the war, before fleeing the country during the Catalonia Offensive in early 1939. He then helped to smuggle refugees with the Ponzán group and joined MI6 as an operative. During missions for the British in Iberia, he was caught in Portugal and handed over to the Francoist dictatorship, which sentenced him to death.

== Early life ==
Agustín Remiro Manero was born in the Aragonese town of Epila, in the province of Zaragoza, on 28 August 1904. His parents, Santo Remiro Medina and María Manero Ibáñez, were from a poor peasant background. They had 12 children, only 5 of whom survived. After briefly attending school, at the age of 10, he went to work as a farmworker and taught himself how to read. By the age of 15, he had become a convinced anarchist. He joined the National Confederation of Labour (CNT), an anarchist trade union confederation which was organising workers at a sugar refinery in his home town.

== Anarchist activism ==
In 1925, Remiro was conscripted into military service and fought in the Rif War, taking part in the defeat of the Rif rebels within a disciplinary unit. When he returned to his home town, he found it under the rule of the dictatorship of Primo de Rivera. He responded by organising an underground anarchist affinity group and forming a network of clandestine trade union cadres in the Jalón river valley. By the time the dictatorship collapsed and the Second Spanish Republic was proclaimed in 1931, Remiro had become a leading organiser in the Jalón valley, speaking alongside Francisco Ascaso and Vicente Ballester at political demonstrations.

In January 1932, Remiro led a strike action at the Epila sugar refinery, but it was suppressed by the Civil Guard, who killed a number of workers. On 22 October 1933, Remiro married Francisca Rodríguez; theirs was the first civil marriage in the town's history. They had two children together: Germinal (b. 1934) and Bienvenida (b. 1937). The growth of the CNT in the Jalón river valley culminated in December 1933, when Remiro participated in the anarchist insurrection. In the months after the insurrection was suppressed, Remiro declined an offer from the Falange Española de las JONS to head their Zaraogoza provincial branch. The following year, he oversaw the construction of a social centre in Épila.

== Civil War ==
In July 1936, while Remiro was working to bring in the harvest in Fuset, a military coup swept the country. Remiro immediately returned to his home town, where he organised popular resistance to the coup. On 21 July, Remiro's ad hoc militia repelled an attack by the Falange, killing many of the attackers. On 26 July, Nationalist forces led a punitive expedition against the town and dispersed its militia. The Nationalists subsequently killed 89 villagers and demolished Remiro's house, but spared his family.

Remiro escaped to the other side of the Ebro, reaching Tardienta and subsequently joining up with the Durruti Column. He led the Column's guerrilla group La Noche, which carried out raids behind enemy lines and rescued trapped anti-fascists. In September 1936, he took part in the capture of Fuent de Todos. He later joined the guerrilla group Los Iguales, which went to the south bank of the Ebro and integrated into the Carod-Ferrer Column. Within this group, he blew up a railway track in the Puebla de Albortón and carried out espionage behind enemy lines, disguised as a Falangist.

In the summer of 1937, Remiro shifted from guerrilla warfare to conventional warfare, participating in the Battle of Belchit and the Battle of Teruel. He then joined the 62nd Mixed Brigade of the 31st Division In March 1938, his unit attempted to resist the Nationalist Aragon Offensive, during which it was defeated at Cedriellas. In the summer of that year, he led a machine gun battalion in the Battle of the Segre and was wounded at La Seu d'Urgell. He then withdrew to France ahead of the Catalonia Offensive in early 1939.

== World War II ==
After crossing the France–Spain border, he was interned in the Argelers concentration camp. There he joined a group led by Francisco Ponzán, which dedicated itself to helping refugees escape Spain. In September 1939, Remiro re-entered Spain and helped 5 CNT members escape over the border to Perpinyà. Following the battle of France, in March 1940, Remiro agreed to collaborate with the Allies in the war against Nazi Germany. In contact with the British Secret Intelligence Services (MI6), their objective was to rescue Jewish refugees and Allied officials, and help them escape to Gibraltar or Portugal. Over the following months, Remiro distributed leaflets throughout Francoist Spain calling for the country to adopt a stance of neutrality. Remiro also helped French socialist politician André Blumel escape to Andorra, even carrying him part of the war.

In January 1941, Remiro was assigned to carry mail for the British diplomatic missions in Spain. The British consulate in Barcelona gave him documents to deliver to its embassy in Madrid, which in turn gave him cash to deliver to the British embassy in Lisbon. On 23 January, he crossed over the Portugal–Spain border from Galicia. He was quickly arrested by the International and State Defence Police (PIDE) and detained in Porto, despite informing his captors of his MI6 agent number. On 26 January 1941, the PIDE handed him over to the Francoist authorities.

== Detention and death ==
He was taken to Madrid and incarcerated in the Porlier Prison, where for four months he was interrogated and tortured for information on his comrades. He was able to write letters to his friends and family, in which he expressed a feeling of abandonment and betrayal, telling them not to trust the British. He also appealed for aid from a priest he had saved in Cervera and his former employer in Fuset, but any guarantees he received "disappeared from his file". On 27 April 1942, a military tribunal sentenced him to capital punishment.

On 21 June 1942, Remiro attempted to escape from his prison, but a police patrol caught him as he exited into the street and shot him. He managed to escape to a nearby house, where he then attempted to commit suicide by jumping out of a fourth-floor window. Police found him badly wounded and shot him in the head. Nine days later, on 30 June, the military tribunal commuted his sentence. When it discovered he had already been killed, it suspended the commutation.

== Bibliography ==
- Ballarín Aured, Manuel (March 2011). "To the British Secret Service he was Agent 3004, Augustin Remiro". KSL: Bulletin of the Kate Sharpley Library (65). Translated by Sharkey, Paul. ISSN 1475-0309.
- Díez Torre, Alejandro R. (2021). "Agustín Remiro Manero". Royal Academy of History (in Spanish).
- Ricao, Antonio Gascón (26 February 2022). "El anarquista Agustín Remiro Manero, agente 3004 del MI-6 británico". Ser Histórico (in Spanish).
