= Pat O'Leary Line =

Resistance organization in France during World War II

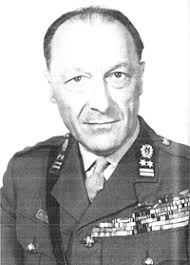
Albert Guérisse, head of the Pat O'Leary Line.

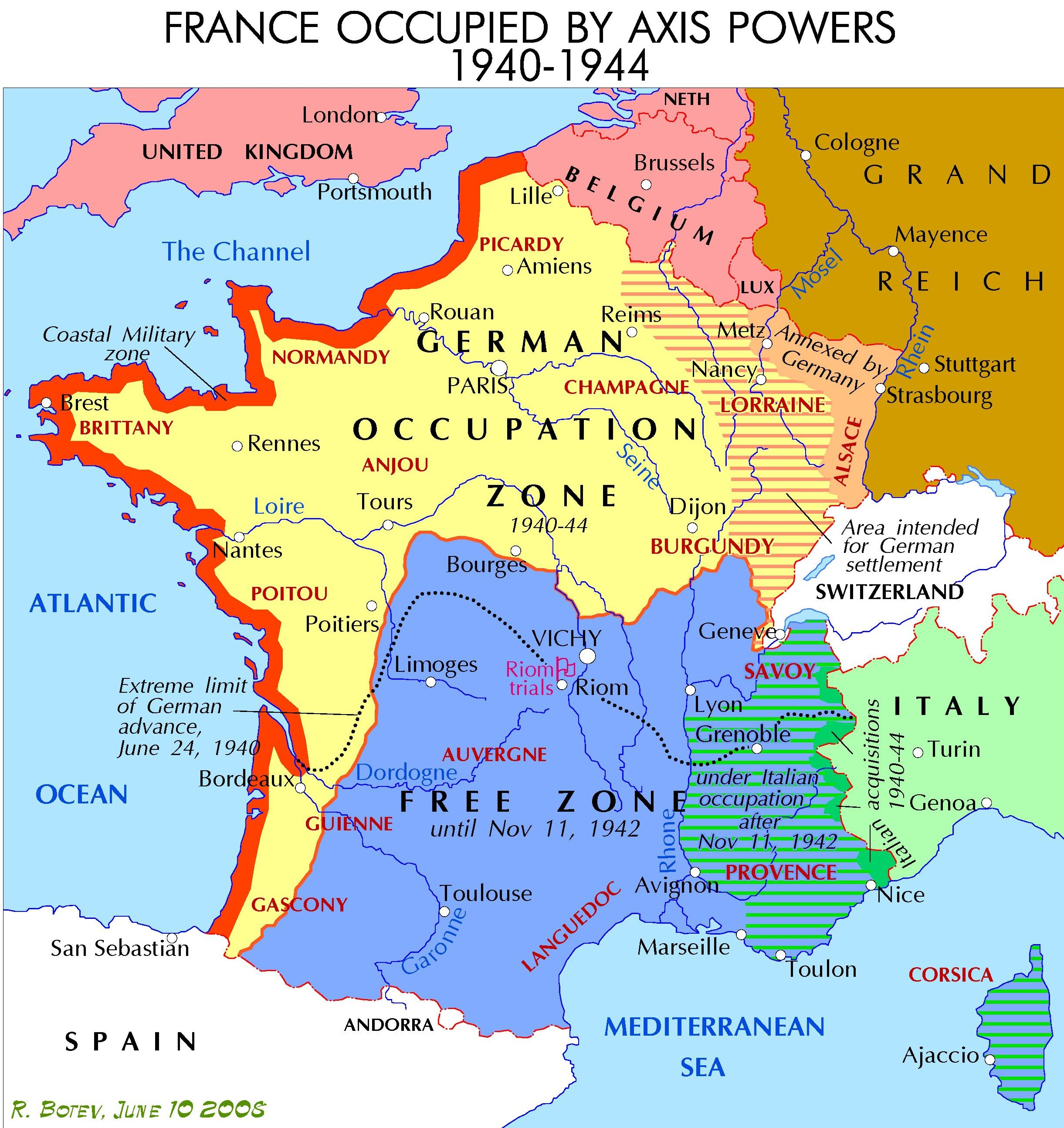

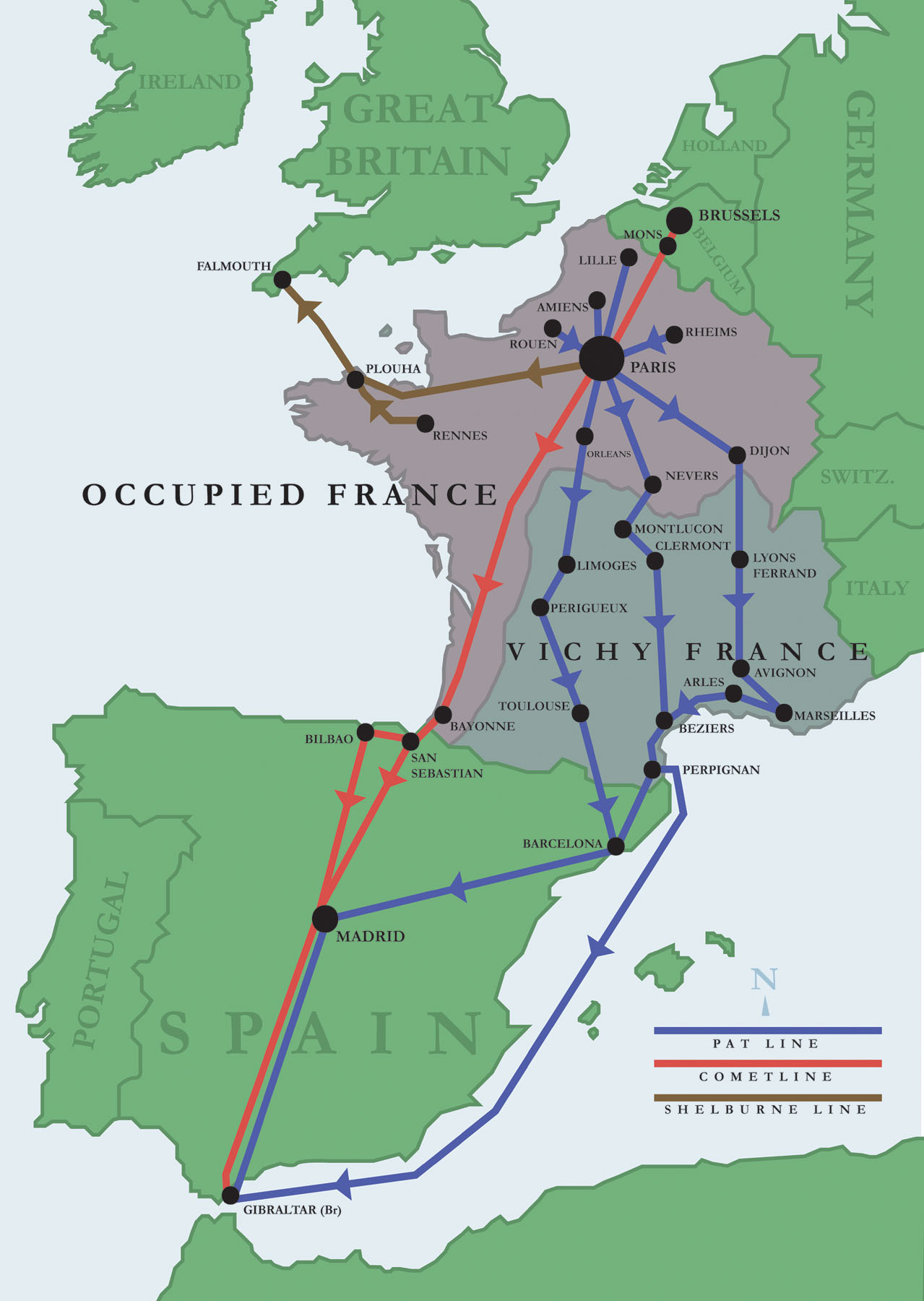
The routes used by the Pat and other Lines to smuggle airmen out of occupied Europe.

The Pat O'Leary Line (also known as the Pat Line, the O'Leary Line, and the PAO Line) was a resistance organization in France during the Second World War. The Pat O'Leary escape line helped Allied soldiers and airmen stranded or shot down over occupied Europe evade capture by Nazi Germany and return to Great Britain. Downed airmen in northern France and other countries were fed, clothed, given false identity papers, hidden in attics, cellars, and people's homes, and escorted to Marseille, where the line was based. From there, a network of people escorted them to neutral Spain. From Spain, British diplomats sent the escapees home from British-controlled Gibraltar. Many different escape lines were created in Europe, of which the Pat Line was the oldest. Collectively, the many escape lines helped 7,000 Allied military personnel, mostly airmen, escape occupied France, Belgium, and the Netherlands. The Pat Line received financial assistance from MI9, a British intelligence agency.

"Pat O'Leary" was the pseudonym of Albert Guérisse, one of the early leaders of the line, which helped more than 600 Allied soldiers and airmen escape from France to Spain. More than 100 volunteers or "helpers" as they were often called, mostly French, working for the Pat Line were arrested and imprisoned by Vichy French or German authorities. Most were imprisoned for the remainder of the war, but many were executed or died in concentration camps.

== Overview ==
The Pat O'Leary Line was one of many escape and evasion networks in the Netherlands, Belgium, and France during World War II. Along with networks such as the Comet Line, the Shelburne Escape Line, and others, they are credited with helping 7,000 Allied airmen and soldiers, about one-half British and one-half American, escape Nazi-occupied Western Europe during World War II. Approximately 12,000 people, nearly all civilians and almost one-half women, were engaged in the work of the escape lines. About 500 of them were captured and executed or died in concentration camps. Many more were imprisoned by the Germans.

In the words of a member of the escape lines, "it was raining aviators" over Europe at the height of World War II. For example, on one day, 14 October 1943, 82 bombers with 800 crewmen of the U.S. Eighth Air Force were shot down or crash-landed in occupied Europe. Most of the crewmen were killed or captured, but some were rescued by escape lines and made it back to Great Britain. "The morale of airmen on bases rose considerably when they saw their buddies miraculously reappear after having been shot down over occupied Europe." For the allies, the rescue of downed airmen by the Pat and other escape lines had a practical as well as a humanitarian objective. Training new and replacement air crews, especially pilots, was expensive and time-consuming. Rescuing airmen downed in occupied Europe and returning them to duty became a priority of the allies.

== History ==
The Dunkirk evacuation of France by British forces in June 1940 left thousands of British and Allied soldiers stranded on the European mainland. Most surrendered or were captured by the Germans, but more than 1,000 made their way to Vichy France, nominally independent, especially the coastal city of Marseille where many took refuge in the British Seaman's Mission headed by a Presbyterian minister named Donald Caskie. Donald Darling, working for the British intelligence agency MI9, in Portugal (and later in Gibraltar) engaged businessman, Nubar Gulbenkian, to lay the groundwork for a network of people to guide stranded allied soldiers over the Pyrenees mountains to neutral Spain from where they could be repatriated to the United Kingdom. As the war went on most of the escapees became airmen shot down over occupied Europe.

The initial leader of what became known as the Pat O'Leary Line was a Scottish soldier, Ian Garrow. Taking advantage of the limited freedom of movement initially accorded him by the Vichy government, he organized the escape system, recruited dozens, and later hundreds, of volunteer workers for the escape line, and found funds for the expenses of housing, transporting, and documenting the Allied soldiers and airmen. At first, some of the exfiltrations to Spain were by sea, but the more common route was for local guides, often smugglers familiar with the Pyrenees, to accompany the soldiers and airmen on foot across the border to Spain. The escapees were escorted onward by train or car, usually by diplomat Michael Creswell, to the British Consulate in Barcelona or the British Embassy in Madrid, and hence to Gibraltar where the MI9 office was headed by Donald Darling. Garrow gathered funds for the expenses of the escape line from residents of Marseille, but MI9 later financed the costs. Garrow was arrested and imprisoned by the Vichy police in October 1941.

Young, careless and exuberant escapees, usually in the late teens or early twenties, seldom appreciated the immense risks being taken on their behalf...If captured they risked imprisonment under the Geneva Conventions. Their civilian helpers faced almost certain torture and death.

Garrow's successor as leader of the Pat Line was Albert-Marie Guérisse, a medical officer in the Belgian army. After Belgium's surrender to the Germans in 1940, Guérisse escaped to Britain through Dunkirk. He then joined the French-crewed ship, Le Rhin, which had been accepted for special operations and renamed HMS Fidelity. He gained a commission in the Royal Naval Volunteer Reserve under the name of "Pat O'Leary." He was of French-Canadian origin and became a British intelligence operative. On 25 April 1941, during a mission to place SOE agents on the French Mediterranean coast near Collioure, he was arrested by the Vichy police. He escaped and joined Garrow in Marseille, with the hope to make his way to Gibraltar and resume his original naval service. Garrow enlisted him as an assistant. After Garrow was arrested, Guérisse took over as chief of the escape network. Guérisse expanded the reach of the escape line's operations.

Working for the escape line became more dangerous in November 1942 when the German military occupied Vichy France and took control of much of the government. Guérisse was arrested by the Gestapo on 2 March 1943, betrayed by Roger le Neveu who had worked with the Pat Line but had been bribed or blackmailed to work for the Germans. The arrest of Guérisse and many others nearly destroyed the O'Leary Line, but a 61-year-old woman named Marie Dissard (code named "Françoise") revived the Line in summer 1943. Dissard lived in Toulouse and sheltered many downed airmen in her apartment and escorted them or directed their escort to Spain. Airey Neave, the MI9 agent who supported the Pat O'Leary line, said that the eccentric Dissard and her cat were "almost the sole survivors" of the Pat Line. Under the leadership of Dissard, the remnants of the O'Leary Line are often called the "Françoise Line."

According to Neave, the Pat Line helped more than 600 allied soldiers and downed airmen escape from France to Spain and return to England.

== Routes ==
The O'Leary Line collected allied soldiers and, after 1940, mostly airmen from northern France, plus a few from other countries. The military personnel were passed down from safe house to safe house and escort-to-escort to Marseille. As exfiltration by felucca down the French and Spanish coasts to Gibraltar became more dangerous, the Line used land routes through the easternmost Pyrenees, and, as that also became more hazardous, shifted its main routes to the high Pyrenees further west which were not patrolled extensively by German soldiers, French police, and Spanish border guards. With the arrest of many O'Leary Line workers and leaders in Marseille, the primary collection point for escapees in 1943 and 1944 became Toulouse.

The most famous of the routes is known as the "Freedom Line," ("Chemin de la Liberté"). From Toulouse, the airmen were taken to the town of Saint-Girons at the foot of the Pyrenees. From there the guide and escapees hiked across the border, via the slopes of Mont Valier, 2,838 metres (9,311 ft) in elevation, and onward to the small town of Esterri d'Aneu in Spain. The distance from Saint-Girons to Esterri d'Aneu was only 42 kilometres (26 miles) in straight line distance, but it involved several days of climbing steep slopes, often through snow and ice.

The job of guiding allied airmen across the Pyrenees to Spain was usually handled by the Ponzán group, headed by the Spanish anarchist Francisco Ponzán. The Ponzán Group was based in Toulouse. The Ponzán group had no affection for the British and Americans, but accepted money and arms from the allies to further their objective of overthrowing the Franco government of Spain. Ponzán was captured in 1943 and executed in 1944 by the Germans.

== Betrayals ==
Given the large number of helpers involved in escape lines, their isolation from each other, and their geographic dispersion, the escape lines were relatively easy to infiltrate by German agents. The Pat O'Leary line was nearly destroyed by two betrayers: Harold Cole, code name "Paul," and Roger Le Neveu, called "Roger Le Legionnaire." Cole worked his way into the confidence of the Pat line by successfully escorting several groups of airmen from Lille in northernmost France to Marseille. The former English soldier was captured by the Germans in December 1941, and gave the Germans information which led to the arrest of several dozen helpers working for the Pat Line, nearly destroying the Line in northern France. Le Neveu, a Frenchman, similarly worked his way into the confidence of the Pat Line and was responsible for the arrest of Albert-Marie Guérisse and other Pat Line helpers in Marseille in March 1943.

== Notable members of the Line ==
The government of France later recognized 475 men and women, 89 percent of them French, for their work with the Pat Line helping allied soldiers and airmen escape occupied Europe. Many others gave occasional assistance to the Pat Line.

Prominent helpers of the Pat O'Leary Line were George Rodocanachi, a medical doctor, and his wife, Fanny; the afore-mentioned Donald Caskie; and Louis Nouveau, a businessman, and his wife, Renée. All three men were arrested and spent the rest of the war in prison. Rodocanachi died in the Buchenwald concentration camp. Fanny Rodocanachi survived the war in Marseille and Renée Nouveau escaped to Great Britain. Nancy Wake was a courier for the Pat Line and, along with her husband, Henri Fiocca, sheltered many airmen in their luxurious Marseille apartment. Wake escaped to Spain in 1943; the Gestapo arrested and executed Fiocca. Andrée Borrel evaded arrest as a member of the Pat Line, became an agent of the United Kingdom's clandestine organization, the Special Operations Executive (SOE), and was later captured and executed. Danielle Georgette Reddé was another courier and later became an SOE agent. Mary Lindell, resident in Paris, collected downed airmen and sent them to the Pat Line in Marseille. She founded the "Marie-Claire Line" and was imprisoned by the Germans. In Lyon, SOE agent and American Virginia Hall assisted downed airmen and the Pat Line. SOE agent Anthony Brooks, worked with the Pat Line in 1941. Alfonsina Bueno ran a house on the line in Banyuls-sur-Mer until her arrest in February 1943.

== See also ==
- Escape and evasion lines (World War II)
