= Pilar Bonet =

Spanish journalist (born 1952)

- Born: Pilar Bonet Cardona; 1952 (age 73–74); Ibiza, Spain
- Education: Autonomous University of Barcelona
- Occupations: Journalist, writer
- Employers: El País; Barcelona Centre for International Affairs
- Awards: Víctor de la Serna Award (1990); Cirilo Rodríguez Journalism Award (1996)

Pilar Bonet Cardona (born 1952) is a Spanish journalist who has spent most of her professional career as a correspondent for the newspaper El País in Moscow.

== Career ==
With a licentiate in Hispanic Philology from the University of Barcelona and in Information Sciences from the Autonomous University of Barcelona, Pilar Bonet completed her training with the study of English, German, and Russian. She started working as a journalist in different media of the Balearic Islands, later going to El Periódico de Catalunya. The EFE agency hired her as a correspondent at its headquarters in Vienna, a place from which, in the 1970s and 1980s, the news of Eastern Bloc countries was covered. After two years at EFE, in 1982 she was hired by El País to be the paper's new head correspondent in the Soviet Union, based in Moscow. In the following fifteen years she remained in the same location, covering the emergence and rise of the Polish trade union Solidarity, the fall of the Berlin Wall and German reunification, the arrival of Mikhail Gorbachev to power in the Soviet Union, the 1991 coup d'état against him, Russia under Boris Yeltsin, and the fall of the communist regimes in Eastern Europe. In 1997, she was assigned as a correspondent to Germany (first in Bonn and then in Berlin), returning to Moscow in 2001, again as a correspondent to Russia and many of the former Soviet satellites that made up the Commonwealth of Independent States.

Pilar Bonet is also an associate researcher and expert at the Spanish think tank Barcelona Centre for International Affairs, and has been recognized for her journalistic work on multiple occasions. She has twice been awarded by the International Press Club as Spain's best foreign correspondent (in 1989 and 2014), in 1990 she received the Víctor de la Serna Award from the Madrid Press Association, and in 1996 she won the Cirilo Rodríguez Journalism Award.

== Books ==
- Moscú (1988), ISBN 9788423316441
- Imágenes sobre fondo rojo. Estampas de la crisis soviética (1992), ISBN 9788403591080
- La Rusia imposible: Borís Yeltsin, un provinciano en el Kremlin (1994), ISBN 9788403593626
