= Conchita Grangé Beleta =

Spanish-born French Resistance fighter and concentration camp survivor

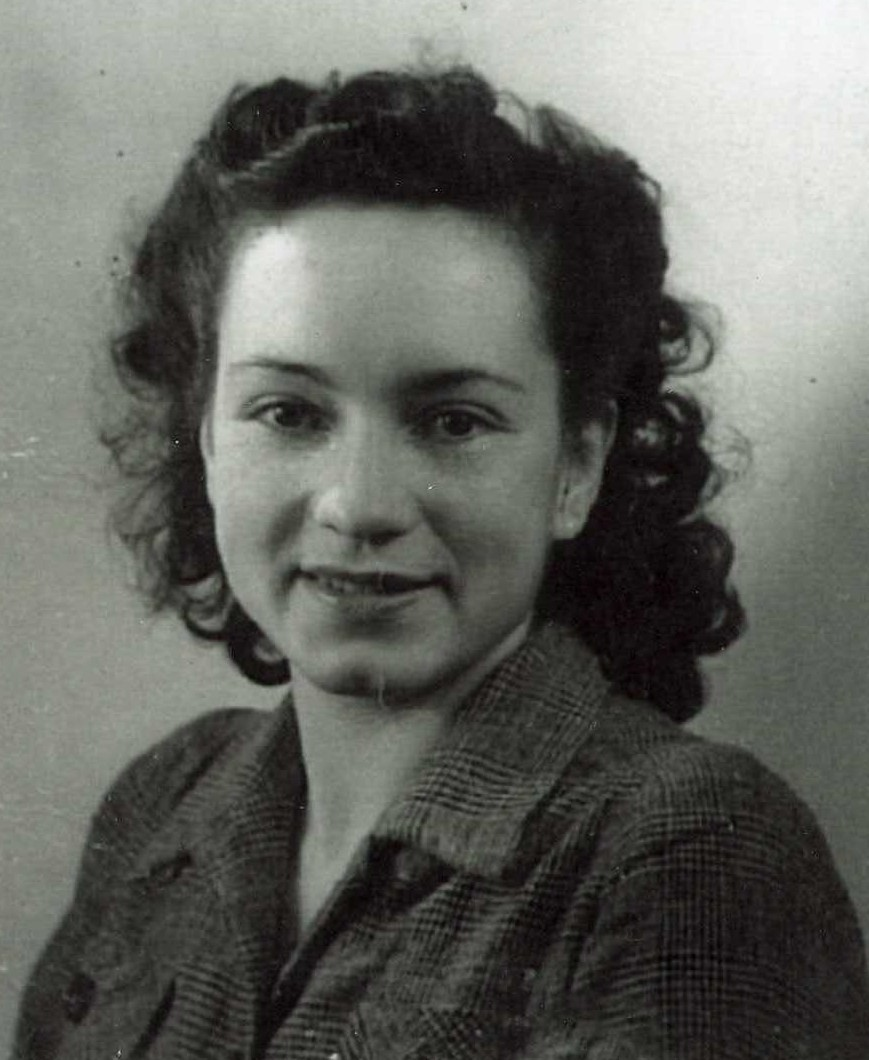
- Born: August 6, 1925; Espui, Catalonia, Spain
- Died: August 27, 2019 (aged 94); Toulouse, France
- Citizenship: Spanish, French
- Occupations: Resistance fighter, activist
- Known for: Participation in the French Resistance, surviving Nazi concentration camps
- Spouse: Josep Ramos (married in 1946)
- Awards: Legion of Honor, Medal of the Resistance, National Order of Merit, War Cross 1939-1945

Conchita Grangé Beleta (August 6, 1925, Espui - August 27, 2019, Toulouse), also known as Conchita Ramos, was a Spanish-born French Resistance fighter and Nazi concentration camps survivor.

== Biography ==
=== Early life ===
Conchita Grangé Beleta was born on August 6, 1925, in Espui, in the province of Lleida, Catalonia. The daughter of Josep Grangé and Maria Beleta, she was one of eight siblings. Due to her mother's illness, she was entrusted at a very young age to her maternal uncle and aunt, Jaime Beleta and Elvira Ibarz, who lived in Toulouse, where she spent part of her childhood.

=== Spanish Civil War ===
In 1936, at the outbreak of the Spanish Civil War, the family returned to Catalonia to support the Spanish Republic. Her uncle Jaime participated in the construction of military airfields until the Republican defeat, after which they took refuge in France, settling in Gudas, Ariège.

=== World War II ===
During World War II, at the age of 17, Conchita Ramos joined the French Resistance, operating mainly in Haute-Garonne and Ariège. She was integrated into the 3rd guerrilla brigade in April 1943. Under the pseudonyms "Nina" or "la Neboudo" (meaning "the niece" in Occitan), she served as a liaison agent, transporting messages and weapons by bicycle and facilitating crossings between France and Spain.

After being denounced, on May 24, 1944, the Foix French Militia (political police created under the Occupation) raided her house in Gudas, where she was hiding resistance fighters. Arrested along with her aunt Elvira Ibarz and her cousin María Ferrer, she was first imprisoned in Foix, then in Caffarelli barracks in Toulouse, then transferred to Saint-Michel prison in Toulouse, then handed to the Gestapo for interrogation. She endured seven interrogations and torture inflicted by the Gestapo, never revealing any information.

On July 3, 1944, Conchita Ramos was deported on the "phantom train", a convoy that departed from Toulouse with around 800 prisoners to reach the Dachau concentration camp on August 28, 1944. Upon arrival, she was registered under the number 93,887. On September 9, 1944, she was transferred to the Ravensbrück camp, where she received the number 62,480, then to the Oranienburg-Sachsenhausen camp. In 1945, she survived the death marches before being liberated by the Red Army in May.

=== After World War II ===
After the war, she returned to France and settled in Toulouse. In 1946, she married Josep Ramos, a former Catalan guerrilla fighter, and became actively involved in preserving the memory of the Resistance and the Deportation. She participated in the activities of the Museum of Resistance and Deportation of Haute-Garonne from its inception and tirelessly shared her testimony with younger generations.

=== Death ===
Conchita Grangé Beleta died on August 27, 2019, in Toulouse, at the age of 94.

== Legacy ==
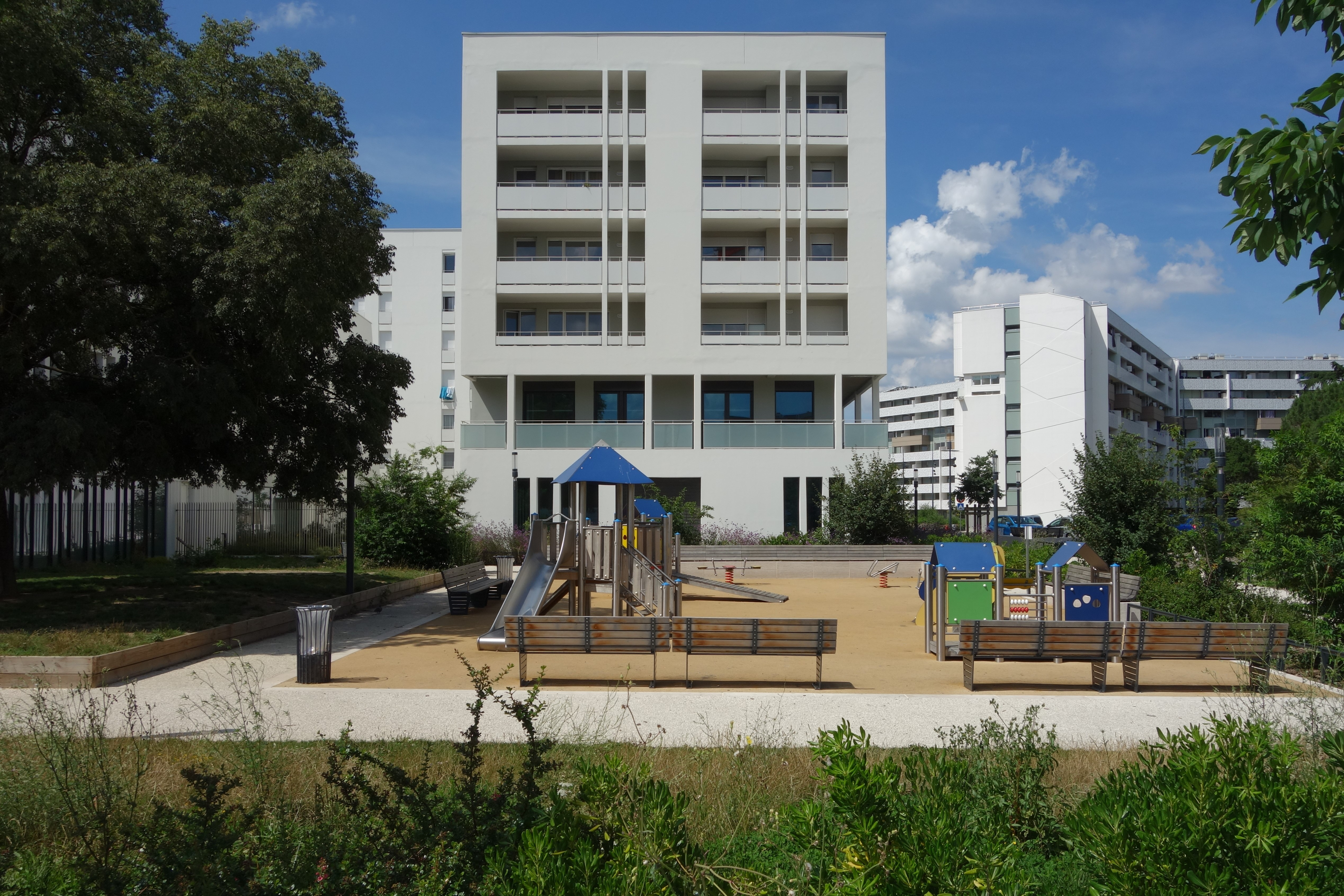
Conchita Grangé Ramos Square (Toulouse)

Throughout her life, she received numerous honorary distinctions, including the Legion of Honor, the Medal of the Resistance, the National Order of Merit, and the War Cross 1939–1945. In tribute to her commitment, a public square in the La Reynerie district of Toulouse bears her name.
