= Ekkehard Tertsch =

Spanish-Austrian journalist (1906–1989)

- Born: 3 August 1906; Trieste, Austria-Hungary
- Died: 30 August 1989 (aged 83); Madrid, Spain
- Citizenship: Austria • Spain
- Occupations: Journalist, diplomat
- Political party: Nazi Party (1933–1945)
- Children: Hermann Tertsch

Ekkehard Tertsch (3 August 1906 – 30 August 1989) was a Spanish-Austrian journalist and a Nazi Germany diplomat.

== Career ==
Tertsch was a close collaborator of Josef Hans Lazar, also an Austrian diplomat and journalist and the chief Nazi propagandist in Spain during World War II.

== Personal life ==
By his wife Felisa Maria de Iciar del Valle Lersundi y del Valle, of the family of the counts of Lersundi, he was father to journalist and politician Hermann Tertsch.

== Bibliography ==
- Agstner, Rudolf (2015). Handbuch des Österreichischen Auswärtigen Dienstes. Band 1: 1918 – 1938. Viena: Lit Verlag. ISBN 9783643506856.
- Apezarena, José (2005). Periodismo al oído. Los confidenciales: de las cartas manuscritas a Internet. Barcelona: Random House Mondadori. ISBN 9788483066386.
- Müller, Stefan; Schriffl, David; Skordos, Adamantios (2016). Heimliche Freunde: Die Beziehungen Österreichs zu den Diktaturen Südeuropas nach 1945. Böhlau Verlag. ISBN 9783205201014.
- Schulze Schneider, Ingrid (1995). "Éxitos y fracasos de la propaganda alemana en España: 1939-1944". Mélanges de la Casa de Velázquez. 31 (3). Madrid: Casa de Velázquez: 197–217. doi:10.3406/casa.1995.2754.
- Tuchel, Johannes (2014). "...und ihrer aller wartet der Strick.". Berlín: Lukas Verlag. ISBN 9783867321785.
