= Hermann Tertsch =

Spanish politician

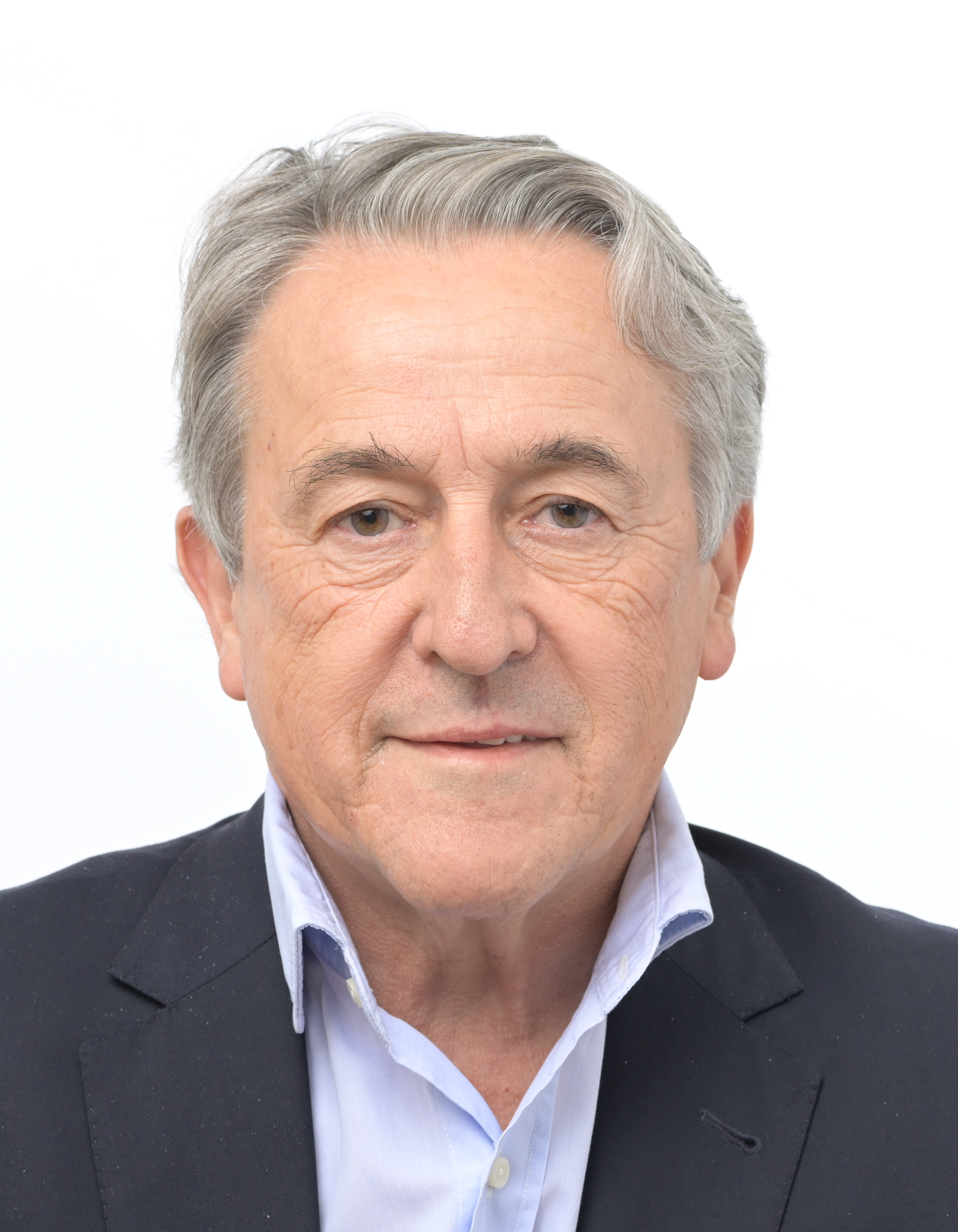
- Official portrait, 2024

Member of the European Parliament
- Incumbent
- Assumed office 2 July 2019
- Constituency: Spain

Personal details
- Born: Hermann Leopoldo Tertsch y del Valle de Lersundi; 9 April 1958 (age 68) Madrid, Spain
- Party: Vox (2019–present)
- Other political affiliations: PCE-EPK (1977)
- Children: 1
- Parent(s): Ekkehard Tertsch (father); Felisa del Valle Lersundi (mother)
- Relatives: Ana Palacio (cousin); Loyola de Palacio (cousin)
- Occupation: Journalist - Politician
- Awards: Cirilo Rodríguez Journalism Award (1989)

Hermann Leopold Tertsch del Valle-Lersundi (Spanish pronunciation: [ˈxeɾman ˈteɾtʃ]; born 9 April 1958) is a Spanish journalist, lawyer and conservative politician. He has been a member of the European Parliament for the Vox party since 2019.

== Biography ==
Tertsch was born in Madrid on 9 April 1958, the son of Ekkehard Tertsch (1906–1989), an Austrian-German diplomat and journalist who was a close collaborator of Josef Hans Lazar, also an Austrian diplomat and journalist and the chief Nazi propagandist in Spain during World War II. Through his mother Felisa del Valle-Lersundi he is a cousin of Loyola de Palacio and Ana de Palacio. He was a member of the Communist Party of the Basque Country in his youth.

Based in Vienna, Tertsch became a correspondent for the Agencia EFE in 1982, covering Central and Eastern Europe. Soon after, in 1983, he began to work for the newspaper El País as correspondent to Bonn. He chronicled the Yugoslav Wars, featuring a marked anti-Serbian point of view. He became a regular columnist and served for a time as the newspaper's op-ed editor. During the years he became a regular radio guest for the Cadena SER, Radio Nacional de España and Onda Cero.

He left El País in 2007, becoming a political opinion writer for the conservative newspaper ABC soon after. He was also hired by Telemadrid, and became the host of the early-morning Diario de la noche in 2008, replacing Fernando Sánchez Dragó. After some weeks of convalescence, as he suffered wounds in what the policial investigation termed as a "bar fight" in a piano-bar in Madrid (the Toni 2) in December 2009, (Note: He argued he had been the victim of a premeditated beating committed by "professionals".) he left the role of host.

In April 2019, Tertsch announced his intention to run for the 2019 European Parliament election in Spain with the Vox party. As the party won 3 seats in the election, he was elected MEP. He joined the Committee on Foreign Affairs (AFET), as well as the Delegation to the EU-Mexico Joint Parliamentary Committee (D-MX) and the Delegation to the Euro-Latin American Parliamentary Assembly (DLAT), serving as vice-chair in the later body. Tertsch was re-elected in June 2024 for another five-year term.

After the announcement of the prospective government formation in Spain under Pedro Sánchez in January 2020 after the November 2019 general election, Terstch, just returned from Bolivia, asked for a military coup in the country to abort what he framed as an "obvious putschist process seeking the demolition of Spain as a nation".

He is a signer of the Madrid Charter, joining an alliance of conservative and right-wing personalities organized by Vox.

== Decorations ==
- Cirilo Rodríguez Journalism Award (1989)
- Golden Cross of the Order of Merit of the Republic of Hungary (2019)
- Order of Merit of the Republic of Poland (2022)
