= Moros, Zaragoza =

Moros
- Municipality
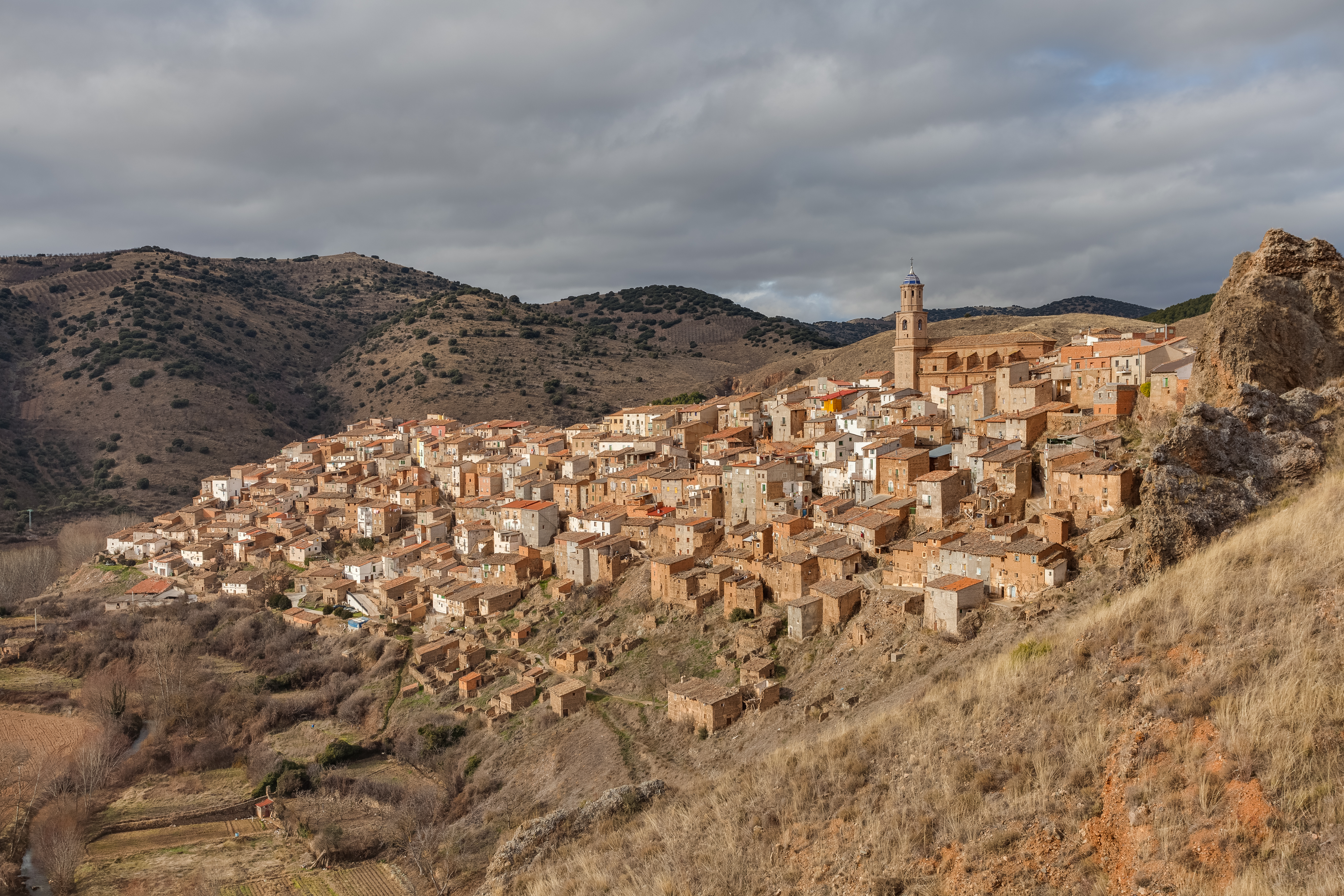
- View of Moros

- Location in Spain Moros (Spain) Moros (Europe)
- Coordinates: 41°24′0″N 1°49′0″W
- Country: Spain
- Autonomous community: Aragon
- Province: Zaragoza
- Comarca: Comunidad de Calatayud
- Judicial district: Calatayud

Area
  - Total: 53.5 km^{2} (20.7 sq mi)
- Elevation: 791 m (2,595 ft)

Population (2025-01-01)
  - Total: 274
  - Density: 5.12/km^{2} (13.3/sq mi)
- Time zone: UTC+1 (CET)
  - Summer (DST): UTC+2 (CEST)
- Postal code: 50215

Moros is a municipality in the province of Zaragoza, Aragon. Its population was 304 in 2021 (Instituto Nacional de Estadística (Spain)).

== Location and climate ==
Moros is located in the mountain range known as the Sistema Ibérico. It lies within the valley of the Manubles River, which is a tributary of the Jalón. The Manubles meanders around the rocky outcrop on which Moros stands.

Moros was evacuated in July 2022 because of forest fires.

== Unique features ==
Moros is one of the most attractive and picturesque villages of its kind in the area. Its narrow streets zigzag from the square at its highest elevation down to the river bed below. The houses are the main feature of the town. Hundreds of houses have been built tightly against the sunny side of the mountain. They are built with mud and decorated with red and ochre Arabic tiles. Each level of houses rises above the one beneath it to catch the sun as it rises over the valley.

The river below waters the gardens and orchards. The setting is famous for its tranquillity and silence. Two bridges in the area cross the river.

== Landmarks ==
Moros sits on the medieval border separating Muslim (Moorish) and Christian kingdoms. Moros is Spanish for Moors. Following the expulsion of the Moors it straddled the Kingdom of Aragon and the Kingdom of Castile. Consequently, the town shows influences of numerous cultures.

=== Iglesia de Santa Eulalia ===
The parish church, situated on the crest of the ridge, is dedicated to Saint Eulalia of Mérida. It was influenced by the Mudéjar style of architecture which is most evident when viewing the apse and the church bell tower. Successive accidents (lightning, electrical sparks and fire) have caused damage to the interior and the dome. It has been speculated that the Inmaculada, a sculpture by Pedro de Mena, may have been destroyed during one of these accidents. Some sources relate that at one time the church also housed a painting by Titian. Paintings depicting the Battle of Lepanto dating from the sixteenth and early seventeenth centuries were also said to have been housed in the church but since have moved to Calatayud after having been purchased for 30,000 pesetas.

=== Ermita (Hermitage) de San Miguel ===
Only some remains of this hermitage still exist. It was destroyed in a fire during the sixteenth century.

=== Ermita de Santa Barbara ===
Remains of hermitage situated on top of a hill northwest of the village.

=== Ermita de Virgen de la Vega ===
Located in the Vega Manubles (river valley) north of town.

=== Castillo del Rey Ayubb ===
The Castillo del Rey Ayubb was likely constructed at the behest of Ayyub ibn Habib al-Lakhmi (Umayyad governor of al-Andalus in AD 716) where tradition holds he resided during hunting seasons. The nearby city, Calatayud - "The Fortress of Ayyub", was also named for him. The castle also played a role in the wars between Aragon and Castile in the sixteenth century.

== See also ==
- List of municipalities in Zaragoza
