= Ramón Lobo =

Spanish-Venezuelan journalist and writer (1955–2023)

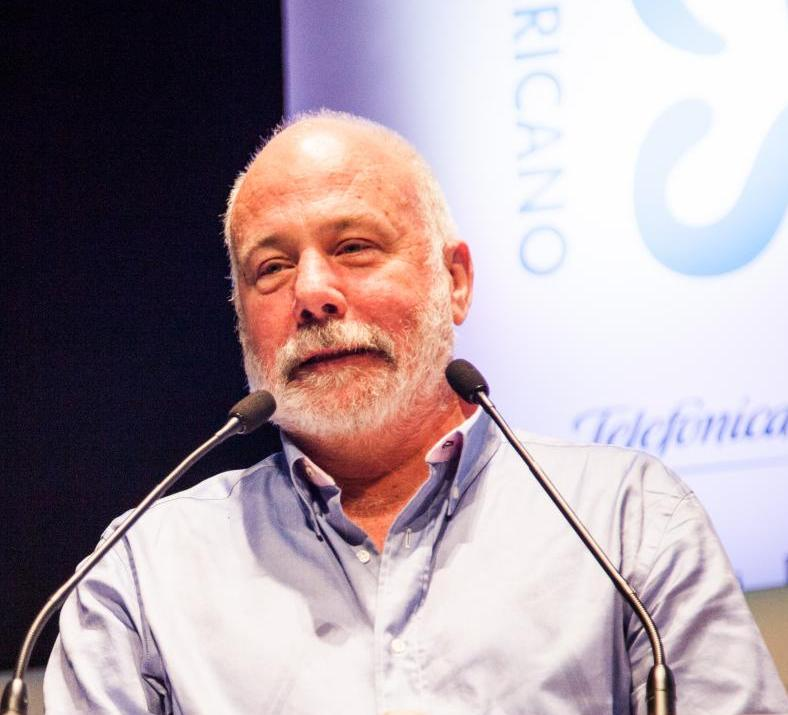
- Lobo in 2014
- Born: Ramón Lobo Leyder; 23 January 1955; Lagunillas Municipality, Zulia, Venezuela
- Died: 2 August 2023 (aged 68); Madrid, Spain
- Education: Complutense University of Madrid
- Occupations: Journalist, writer
- Years active: 1992–2023
- Awards: XVIII Cirilo Rodríguez Award (2001)

Ramón Lobo Leyder (23 January 1955 – 2 August 2023) was a Spanish-Venezuelan journalist and writer who worked for Spanish newspaper El País.

== Biography ==
Born in Venezuela to a Spanish father and an English mother, Ramón Lobo had been based in Spain since 1960. Graduated in Journalism from the Complutense University of Madrid, since 1975 he worked in various media such as Pyresa, Radio Intercontinental, Heraldo de Aragón, Radio 80, Actual, Voice of America, Expansión, Cinco Días, La Gaceta de los Negocios and El Sol.

From August 1992 until 2012, he worked as editor of the International section of El País, covering various conflicts: Croatia, Serbia and Kosovo, Bosnia-Herzegovina, Albania, Chechnya, Iraq, Lebanon, Argentina, Haiti, Rwanda, Nigeria, Equatorial Guinea, Sierra Leone, Uganda, Congo, Zimbabwe, Namibia and the Philippines.

In 2001, he received the XVIII Cirilo Rodríguez Journalism Award, granted by the Association of the Press of Segovia and directed the summer course "The uncomfortable witnesses: Reporters in a conflict zone" at the King Juan Carlos University.

In 2012, at an event at the Miguel Hernández University of Elche (UMH) in which the journalist Juan R. Gil and the writer José Luis V. Ferris also participated, he recounted his experiences in journalism.

In 2013, he began collaborating with El Periódico de Catalunya, of the Zeta Group writing a weekly article on Sundays in the international section under the heading "Nomads", commenting on the main issues of global news.

In 2018, he returned to El País. Ramón Lobo died from lung cancer on 2 August 2023, at the age of 68.

== Works ==
- El héroe inexistente (Aguilar, 1999, ISBN 978-84-03-59852-2): It is divided into three blocks: Balkan War, from Bosnia-Herzegovina until Kosovo-Serbia; the conflicts in Chechnya, Iraq and Haiti, and the wars in Rwanda, Zaire, Republic of Congo, Equatorial Guinea and Sierra Leone.
- Isla África (Seix Barral, 2001, ISBN 978-84-322-1103-4): situation in Sierra Leone and the child-soldiers.
- Cuadernos de Kabul (RBA, 2010, ISBN 978-84-9867-782-9)
- El autoestopista de Grozni y otras historias de fútbol (KO, 2012, ISBN 978-84-939336-9-2)
- Todos náufragos (Ediciones B, 2015, ISBN 978-84-666-5825-6)
- El día que murió Kapuściński (Círculo de Tiza, 2019, ISBN 978-84-949131-4-3)
