= Enric González =

Spanish journalist and writer (born 1959)

Enric González Torralba
- Born: 1959 (age 65–66); Barcelona, Spain
- Occupation: Columnist
- Years active: 1976–present
- Employer: El Mundo

Enric González (born 1959) is a Spanish journalist and writer. After several years working as a correspondent for El País, he left the newspaper in October 2012 only to announce his arrival at El Mundo three months later, where he now publishes a weekly column. He also collaborates with Jot Down Cultural Magazine.

== Career ==
Son of the writer and journalist Francisco González Ledesma, Enric González denied he wanted to follow his paths until age seventeen, when he began to write in the Hoja del Lunes de Barcelona, a simple publication usual at that time, as newspapers were not published in Spain on Mondays until the late 1980s.

He then went through El Correo Catalán and El Periódico de Catalunya, before landing in El País in the mid-1980s. He specialised in correspondent and special envoy tasks, covering the Gulf War in the early 1990s, from where he subtly criticised embedded journalism, as well as Rwandan genocide and nuclear tests in Moruroa.

His best known work came from his posts as correspondent in diverse cities, such as London, Paris, New York City, Washington, Rome and Jerusalem, from where he did not only cover local and national news, but successfully achieved to describe their societies through different weekly columns. London, New York, where he was based at when 9/11 terrorist attack took place although he had gone to Washington that very same day, and Rome, where he covered Pope John Paul II death, profoundly marked him, pushing him to publish three books on his experiences in these cities.

He also proved to be a great football fan, declaring to be an Espanyol, Inter Milan, AJ Auxerre and FC Nantes supporter, which led him to publish a weekly column from Italy, willing to describe Italian society through Calcio. His columns on that topic were reunited in Historias del Calcio, one of his published books.

His relationship with El País progressively deteriorated in the second part of the 2000s, and especially after one of his columns was censored due to his critics on the newspaper management, until he announced his departure in October 2012 as a protest against the job cuts PRISA was putting in place in El País. After three months focusing on his task of collaborator for online cultural magazine Jot Down, El País's rival El Mundo announced the inclusion of Enric González in his staff for a weekly column.

== Books ==
Enric González has written seven books, six of them related to his experience reporting abroad and one on the history of Espanyol football club:

- Historias de Londres (1999)
- Historias de Nueva York (2006)
- Historias del Calcio (2007)
- Historias de Roma (2010)
- Todas las historias (2011), the publishing house RBA gathers in one book González stories about London, New York and Rome
- Una cuestión de fe (2012), on RCD Espanyol
- Memorias líquidas (2013)

== Awards ==
- In 2006, González won the XXII Cirilo Rodríguez Journalism Award, a journalists award which recognizes the efforts of Spanish correspondents, for the best Spanish war correspondent.
- Premio Ciudad de Barcelona de Periodismo (2009).
