= Rosa María Calaf =

Spanish journalist (born 1945)

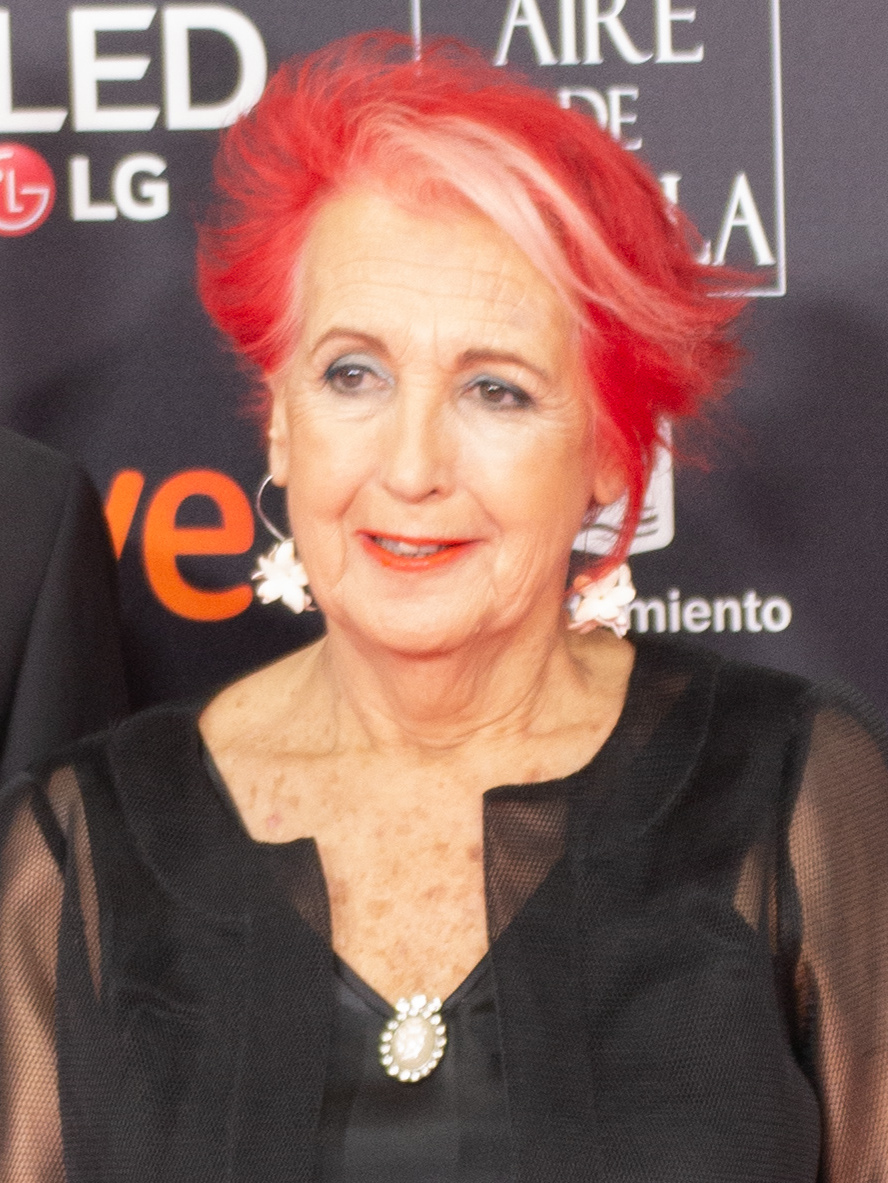
- Calaf in 2020
- Born: Rosa María Calaf Solé; 17 June 1945 (age 81); Barcelona, Spain
- Education: Autonomous University of Barcelona; University of Barcelona
- Occupations: Journalist, news anchor and correspondent

Rosa Maria Calaf Solé (Spanish: [ˈrosa maˈɾi.a] : born 17 June 1945) is a Spanish journalist, reporter, news anchor and former correspondent of Televisión Española. She was a TVE correspondent from 1972 until her retirement in 2008. She was also a director of programming at TV3 in 1983. She has received numerous prizes for her work.

== Early life and career ==
Her maternal grandfather hails from Rocafort de Queralt (Tarragona), was a businessman. She graduated in law from the University of Barcelona and in journalism from the Autonomous University of Barcelona. In 2008 she was invested Doctor Honoris Causa by the Rovira i Virgili University in Tarragona and in 2010 from the Miguel Hernández University of Elche. The silver streak on her forehead that would be defined as her characteristic feature, was the brainchild of stylist Luis Llongueras.

Rosa Maria Calaf has been until her retirement in 2008 the oldest correspondent of TVE, with 37 years of journalism behind. She was a TVE correspondent in New York City (1984-1987), Moscow (1987-1989;1996-1999), Buenos Aires (1989-1993), Rome (1993-1995), Vienna (1996), Hong Kong (1998-2007) and Beijing (2007-2008). Her last job was as a correspondent for BBC1 in the Asia Pacific region. She was also director of programming for TV3 in 1983.

In over three decades of professional experience she has been in over a hundred countries, microphone in hand in search of news. Due to the redundancy of RTVE for 50 years awaiting her impending retirement, but eventually covered the Asia-Pacific area, preparing coverage of the Beijing Olympics in 2008. In November 2008 layoff voluntarily availed of TVE. In 2009, she finally retired from the reporting industry.
