= Saint-Michel prison (Toulouse) =

Former prison in Toulouse

Saint-Michel prison is a former penal institution located in Toulouse, in service from 1872 to 2009, known for its role during the Occupation and its characteristic 19th century architecture.

== History ==
=== Creation ===
Bust of Jacques-Jean Esquié, produced in Rome between 1881 and 1882.

Saint-Michel prison, located at 18 bis de la Grande-rue Saint-Michel in Toulouse, was designed by architect Jacques-Jean Esquié in 1855. It was built between 1861 and 1869. Initially designed to accommodate 400 inmates, it opened in 1872 after temporarily serving as a hospital following the Franco-Prussian War. It was the first French prison built on the panoptic model, allowing a single guard to monitor all the cells on their floor from a central point.

=== During World War II ===
Between 1940 and 1942, the Vichy regime used the Saint-Michel prison to intern resistance fighters who had been arrested and sentenced to prison terms.

Between November 11, 1942, and August 19, 1944, the Saint-Michel prison was a central location for Nazi repression in Toulouse (Toulouse was occupied by German troops from November 11, 1942, to August 19, 1944). Numerous resistance fighters were incarcerated, interrogated and, for some, executed there. Among them was Marcel Langer, leader of the 35th brigade of the FTP-MOI, guillotined on July 27, 1943. André Malraux, writer, and future minister, was also detained there before being freed, on August 19, 1944, thanks to the intervention of resistance fighters. Among the inmates were Conchita Grangé Beleta, Angèle Bettini, Henriette Guiral, Suzanne Guiral, Raymond Naves, François Verdier, Alice Bessou-Kokine, Pierre Malafosse, Elisa Garrido.

=== After World War II ===
After the war, the prison continued to house common law and political prisoners, notably during the Algerian war. Over the decades, however, the prison suffered from overcrowding and detention conditions that were repeatedly denounced.

In 1978, two of the five inmates who escaped and were recaptured from Toulouse's Saint-Michel prison claimed to have discovered a pit containing human bones while digging their escape tunnel. Their testimony was quickly dismissed by the authorities, and the case fell into oblivion. In 2004, Monique Delattre-Attia, whose father, a member of the French Resistance, disappeared in 1944, re-launched her research into unclassified mass graves from the Second World War. Documents and eyewitness accounts suggest that prisoners were secretly executed, but official investigations have yielded no conclusive results. An archaeological excavation project is attempting to locate this presumed grave, despite the challenges posed by urbanization of the site, administrative constraints and lack of material evidence.

In January 2003, the prison's 480 or 519 or 528 (various sources give different figures) inmates were transferred to the new Seysses prison, marking the beginning of the prison's gradual closure. The semi-liberty center continued to operate until October 2009, when the last inmates left the premises.

=== After closure ===
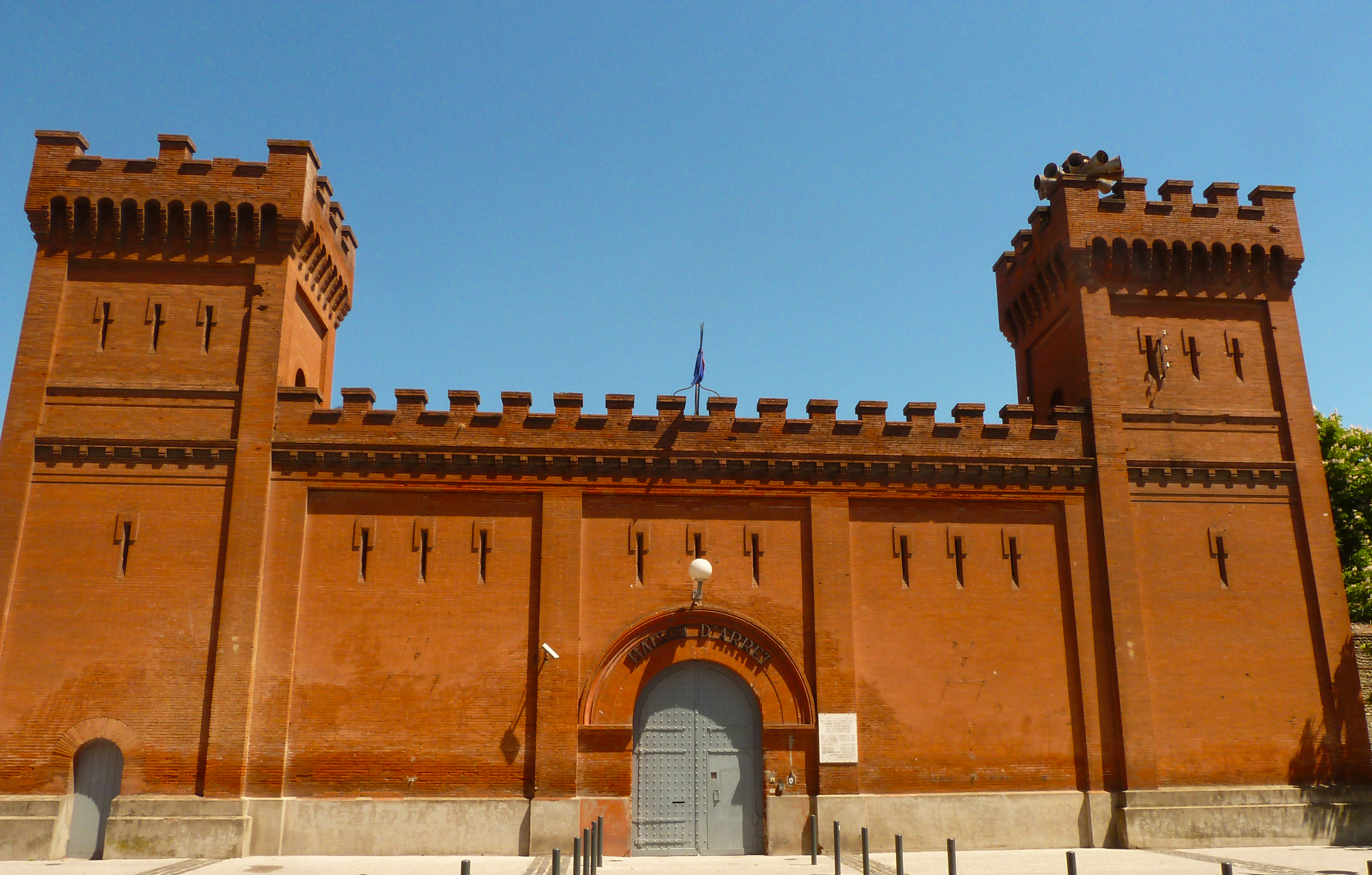
Castelet

Since its closure, the future of the Saint-Michel prison has been the subject of much debate. In 2011, the entrance Castelet, main courtyard and adjacent buildings were listed as Historic Monuments. Local associations are campaigning for the conservation and rehabilitation of the site as a public facility, highlighting its historical and heritage importance. In 2020, the Castelet reopened its doors to the public as a cultural and memorial space.

On July 21, 2022, the French government launched a call for ideas for the future of Toulouse's former Saint-Michel prison. The aim of the call is to gather proposals that respect the architecture and history of the site, with an emphasis on its cultural and artistic vocation. At the same time, the Toulouse Metropolis is maintaining its Cité de la Musique project, including an auditorium and housing, but is encountering financial difficulties in its realization. The sale price of the site, initially set at 11.2 million euros, has been lowered to 5.5 million in 2019, but could be re-evaluated depending on the projects submitted. On March 25, 2024, the French government finally decided on the future of the site, announcing that the services of the Ministry of Justice would be housed in the former Saint-Michel prison. This decision puts an end to plans to sell the building, envisaged since 2011, as well as to alternative proposals, notably that of the Toulouse Metropolis for a Cité de la Musique and that of the Departmental Council for a secondary school.

== Architecture ==
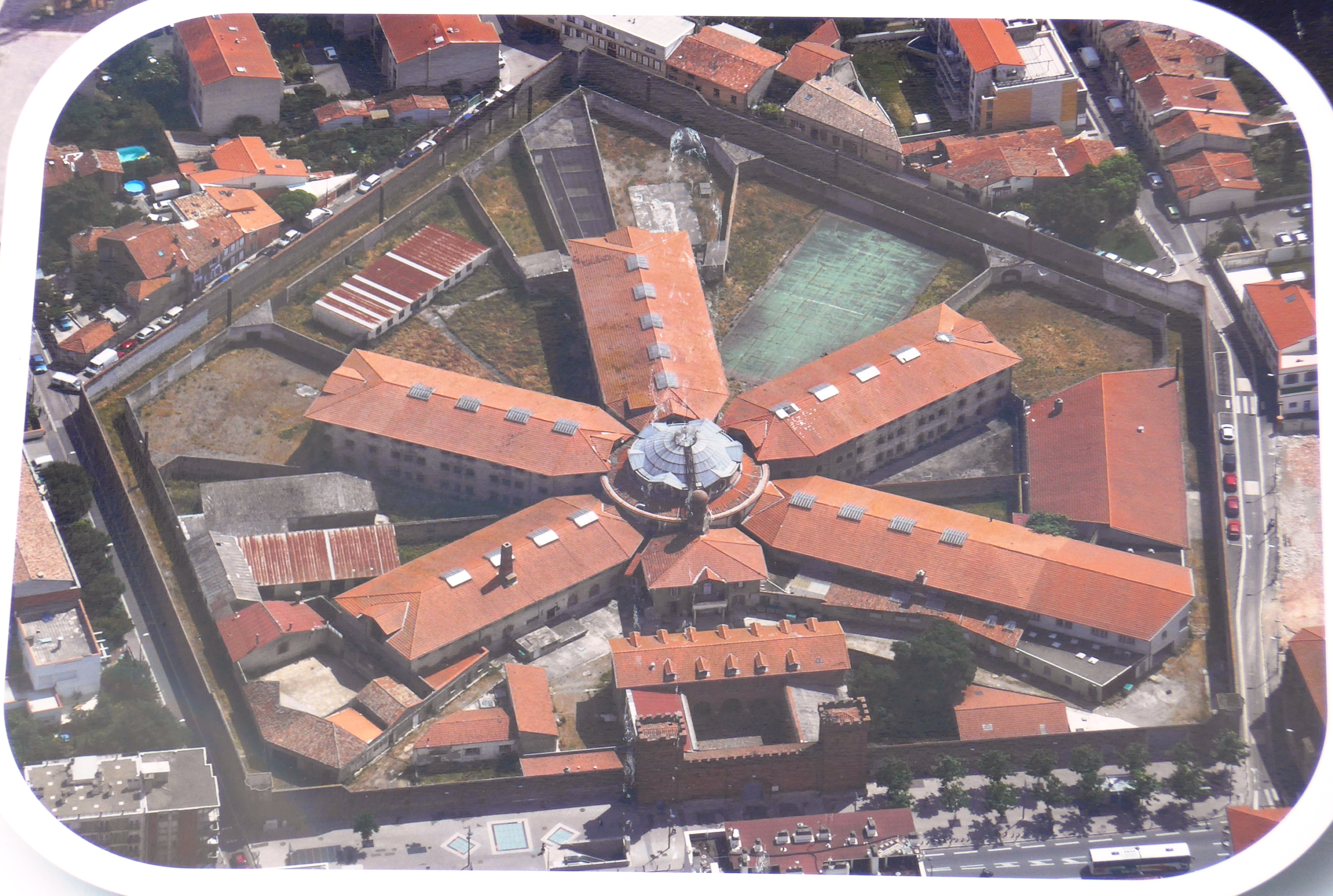
Saint Michel Prison

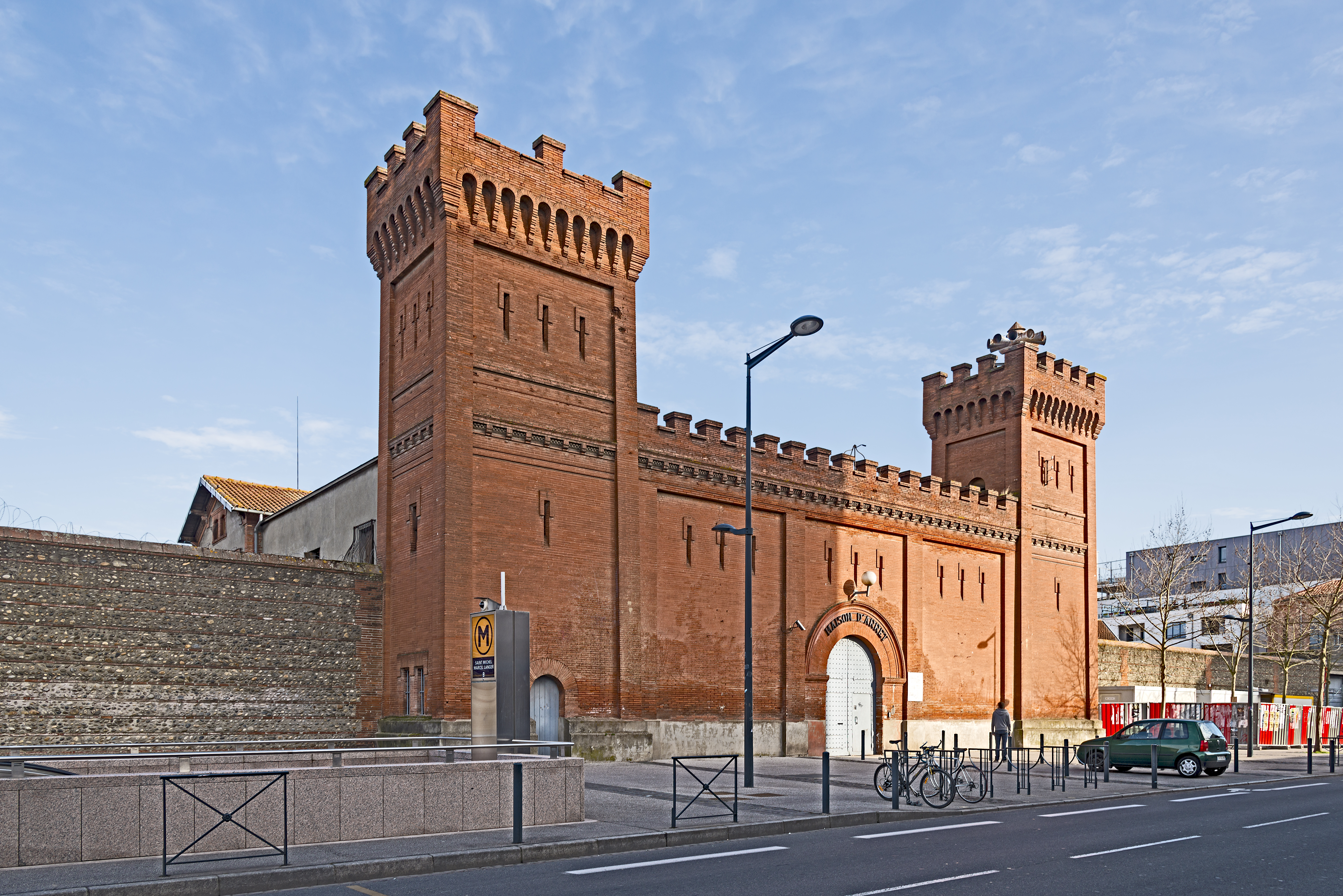
Prison entrance.

The former prison features a distinctive architectural design. Its layout follows a radial typology, inspired by English and American models that advocated solitary confinement but adapted to imperial principles favoring separation by categories. Its monumental entrance, the Castelet, stands out with a neo-medieval style in brick, a material typical of the Toulouse region. Resembling a fortress, it includes a thickly vaulted gateway, battlements, arrow slits, and prominent corner towers, asserting its urban presence. At the heart of the complex, the central circular structure, connecting the five detention wings, is built with bricks and pebbles, punctuated by circular openings framed by engaged columns, and topped with a zinc dome. Accessible via a brick pavilion, it was designed to oversee the entire penitentiary site.
