= Ponzán group =

Ponzán Group
- Grupo Ponzán
- Leader: Francisco Ponzán Vidal
- Country: (Second Spanish Republic) Spain
- Ideology: Anarchism
- Political position: Far-left
- Part of: (Second Spanish Republic) Spanish Resistance

The Ponzán group was an organization of guides and couriers, made up mainly of Spanish anarchists, which operated in Southern France and in Spain during World War II. It took its name from Francisco Ponzán Vidal, who was mainly responsible for the group. Its center of operations was located in Toulouse. For a source of income, the Ponzán Group worked for the Pat O'Leary escape network guiding Allied airmen who had been shot down over German-occupied Europe to Spain and safety from capture.

== History ==
In the words of Albert Guérisse, head of the English Pat O'Leary Line.

“Vidal always greeted Pat like a brother. A man who never said he could do anything without promptly carrying it out, he did not particularly like the English, the Germans, or the French, regarding them all as so many pawns in his own game of undermining the Franco régime and replacing it with anarchy. He had one complaint against life. It did not yield him enough arms. He needed, he continually said to Pat, more revolvers, more rifles, and perhaps if it could be managed, an occasional machine-gun.”

Robert Terres, a French agent, referred to the members of the Ponzán Group as:

“Recruited (by the English) in the border regions among the most irreducible and most idealistic elements of the anti-fascist refugees determined to continue the fight against Franco and ready to accept any help (...) in the form of protection and money.”

Agustín Remiro, arrested and sentenced to death after a Ponzán Group mission in Spain and Portugal, wrote in a letter addressed to López (probably Eusebio López Laguarta) from the Madrid prison:

"Don't trust the English, they are scoundrels (...) and they only want us to exploit our will. I am not spiteful, no, I am only speaking to you so that you are not victims of those responsible for Spanish pain."

== See also ==
- Anarchism in Spain
- Anarchism in France

== Bibliography ==
- Téllez, Antoni (1996). La red de evasión del Grupo Ponzán (in Spanish). Barcelona: Virus. ISBN 978-84-88455-29-1. OCLC 914756442.
- Calvet, Josep (2008). Les muntanyes de la llibertat (in Catalan). Barcelona: L'Avenç. ISBN 978-84-88839-27-5. OCLC 276810103.
- Ponzán, Pilar (1996). Lucha y Muerte por la Libertad : Memorias de 9 años de guerra: 1936-1945 (in Spanish). Barcelona: Tot Editorial. ISBN 9788460548676. OCLC 1187082833.
- Faligot, Roger (1982). Les services spéciaux de Sa Majesté. La Vérité vraie (in French). Paris: Temps Actuels. ISBN 9782201015809. OCLC 9093276.
- Garder, Michel (1967). La guerre secrete des Services Speciaux français (1935-1945) (in French). Paris: Plon. OCLC 987387488.
- Nouveau, Louis H (1958). Des capitaines par milliers (in French). Paris: Calmann-Lévy. OCLC 81780372.
