= Dowding (surname) =

Dowding is an English surname of Old English origin. Notable people with this surname include the following:

- Alan Dowding (1929–2023), Australian cricketer and schoolteacher
- Bruce Dowding, Australian spy for Britain
- Gordon Dowding (1918–2003), Canadian politician
- Hugh Dowding, 1st Baron Dowding, Royal Air Force commander during World War II
- Keith Dowding, professor of political science at the London School of Economics
- Keith Dowding (activist), Australian Presbyterian minister
- Leilani Dowding, British glamour model
- Muriel Dowding, Baroness Dowding, wife of Hugh Dowding; English animal rights campaigner
- Peter Dowding, former Australian politician and premier of Western Australia
