= Dowding (disambiguation) =

Hugh Dowding was an officer in the Royal Air Force.

Dowding may also refer to:

- Dowding (surname)
- Baron Dowding, British peerage created in 1943 for ACM Hugh Dowding (1882–1970)
- Dowding Ministry, ministry of the Government of Western Australia 1988–1990 under Peter Dowding
