= Beauty Without Cruelty =

International animal rights organisation and cruelty-free cosmetic companies

Beauty Without Cruelty (BWC) was founded as an educational charitable trust in England in 1959 by Muriel, the Lady Dowding (1908–1993), past president of the National Anti-Vivisection Society (NAVS) and wife of Lord Dowding (1882–1970), the former commander-in-chief of RAF Fighter Command during the Battle of Britain. It investigated and exposed the brutality inflicted on animals in the fur and cosmetic trade and led the way in the commercial production of synthetic alternatives to fur and cosmetics, without the use of animal ingredients and not tested on animals, pioneering the cruelty-free movement. The initial fundamental purpose of the charitable trust was to demonstrate that alternatives to cruelly derived clothing and cosmetics were easily obtainable and, if they did not exist, to get them on the market. BWC spread the concept that one could easily look beautiful, without inflicting cruelty and death upon any creature.

In 1963, Dowding set up Beauty Without Cruelty Limited (BWC Ltd), the trading branch of the charity, so their cruelty-free cosmetics and other products, including simulated furs could be sold. This later became a private company.

The charity, now known as the BWC Charitable Trust, established branches in Australia, New Zealand, India, South Africa, United States, Canada, Scotland, Wales, Ireland, the Netherlands, Kenya, Rhodesia, Japan, Finland and Hong Kong. The first Beauty Without Cruelty boutique opened in central London in 1965.

Currently two independently run BWC charitable organisations are in existence having expanded the scope of work: Beauty Without Cruelty – India and Beauty Without Cruelty (South Africa). There are also two independent cruelty-free cosmetic companies: Beauty Without Cruelty in the United Kingdom and Beauty Without Cruelty in the United States. These are vegan and continue to refuse to test their products on animals.

== BWC history ==
=== Exposing cruelty in the fur trade ===
Dowding, dedicated to the rights of animals, was appalled by the suffering and cruelty involved in the production of fur coats and fur accessories, fashionable at the time. In 1959, she explored the alternatives to fur and set out to make known her findings to the wider public. With friends, Sylvia Barbanell, Olive Burton, Elspeth Douglas Reid, Dr Barbara Latto and Monica Latto drawn into the idea they formed a small volunteer committee to stage fashion shows featuring simulated furs bearing the label ‘Beauty Without Cruelty’. They exposed the cruelty behind the barbaric fur trade in order to change public opinion, whilst also demonstrating the suffering inflicted on animals.

The first London fashion show caused much publicity and was a great success, leading to subsequent events in England. People began writing to Dowding, and national papers, radio and television picked up on the story and the movement escalated, becoming clear that many were anxious to help. BWC tried to remain a movement, that worked alongside other animal welfare groups and organisations, not another society in competition with others. As interest grew, they began a periodical newsletter to keep in touch with their many supporters. BWC's campaign to make fake furs socially acceptable and virtuous made an effective contribution to the development of fake fur, as each season brought advances to the quality of their fabrics.

=== Exposing cruelty in the cosmetic industry ===
Alongside BWC's exposure of the fur trade, Dowding brought the public's attention to the use of animal ingredients in cosmetics, which were obtained in no less of a cruel and ruthless manner. She learnt a closely guarded trade secret, that cosmetic companies also tested their products on animals, on a very large scale, often in horrific ways. This knowledge led to an important part of BWC's early work, examining claims made by manufacturers that their products were free from cruelty. Cosmetic products, where necessary were tested and analysed by BWC's technical adviser, a well-known cosmetic chemist, Mr. F. V. Wells and cosmetic analyst Dr. G. N. James, as at that time no labelling requirements were laid down for cosmetics contents, although manufactured foodstuff required this by law. BWC published these findings in a brochure, More Than Skin Deep, itemising beauty and household products available on the market, not tested on animals or containing animal ingredients, other than beeswax, honey or lanolin, along with non-leather shoes, gloves and handbags, allowing the consumer to buy with a clear conscience. BWC (U.S.A.) later followed suit publishing its own guide listing cruelty-free companies.

Following Dowding's failed attempt to persuade cosmetic firms to create a range of cosmetics that did not involve any cruelty to animals, a BWC committee member and former chemist, Kathleen Long, who had made cosmetics for friends during the war, created their first cruelty-free creme formula, which was made up by John Bell & Croyden. The minimal profit made from this was ploughed back into making the next product and so on. Eventually through trial and error, Long, on behalf of BWC, developed the first full range of cruelty-free cosmetics, created from the finest oils and essences of plants, herbs and flowers. Long continued working with BWC until her death in 1970. According to Dowding, BWC pioneered the production of 100 percent vegetable soap as a luxury item.

In 1963, a solicitor Noel Gabriel, as a gift, converted BWC into a registered educational charitable trust as he noticed they were doing something which no other organisation in the animal welfare movement was doing, enabling them to have members whose fees would pay for the running costs and help Dowding pay for the increased secretarial support required for the movement's rapid growth. As charities could not enter trade, he also created a limited company, Beauty Without Cruelty Ltd, under which the cruelty-free products they promoted and manufactured could be sold. All profits from the cruelty-free sales went back to the charity.

=== BWC expansion ===
Dowding searched unsuccessfully for a shop that would have a Beauty Without Cruelty counter, due to the conflict of interest with many of the established cosmetic firms. In 1963, a small BWC boutique was opened in a committee member's garage in Bayswater, London, selling the cruelty- free products. In 1965, BWC bought and opened its first boutique at 49 Upper Montagu Street, London. Affiliated branches began opening boutiques in Britain enabling more people access to cruelty-free clothes and cosmetics.

A quarterly journal, Compassion, covered BWC's activities and published articles on kindred subjects in the wider humanitarian field. A kinship with all forms of life was encouraged. The public was reached through newspaper and magazine articles, television and radio in Britain and abroad. Fashion and film shows, exhibitions and public meetings were held. Council members and other qualified speakers addressed interested societies and organisations.

By 1962, BWC had established branches in Australia, Japan, the United States and New Zealand, and Canada in 1963. In the United Kingdom, a Northern and a Scottish branch started in 1965. The Rhodesian and South African branch began in 1966, and a Welsh branch in 1967. In 1973, Dr. Ethel Thurston founded a United States branch in New York. A BWC branch in India was started in 1974. By 1975, there were branches set up in Durban, Pretoria and Cape Town in South Africa, Kenya, the Netherlands, Ireland and further United Kingdom branches in Lancashire, Leeds, East Midlands, Edinburgh and Glasgow. Finland began its own branch in 1978 and Hong Kong in 1981. In 1969, BWC became associated with Compassion in World Farming.

BWC was supported by its president Lord Dowding and vice presidents, who included Michaela Denis, Spike Milligan and his wife Patricia Ridgeway (Paddy), Brigid Brophy, Maureen Duffy, Tony Britton, Grace Cooke, Rupert Davies, Harry Edwards, Dr. Richard St. Barbe Baker, Eva Batt, Rukmini Devi Arundale, Patrick Moore and others. Models gathered to support BWC fashion shows. In 1970, Dowding asked former top fur model Celia Hammond to observe the seal cull off the Gulf of St Lawrence, Canada, to help raise awareness on behalf of BWC.

Due to the rapid growth in demand for BWC cosmetics, which caused considerable production problems, Dowding's son, David Whiting became marketing and production director of BWC Ltd in early 1970 until 1973. Whiting also led BWC in expanding its activities, by launching international investigations into the illegal trade and cruel exploitation of animals. Reports in the press dubbed him ‘The Animal Spy’, as he made the hard facts of the poaching, smuggling, slaughter and abuse of animals for the fashion and cosmetic's industry freely available to the public and industry alike.

The cosmetic company was later taken over by Grenville Hawkins and Joseph Piccioni. Later, in 1978, Piccioni became the managing director of BWC Ltd in Great Britain. With his business expertise and dedication to animal rights, Piccioni helped lead BWC Ltd to launch its lines in the United States in 1989.

In 1979, Dr Ethel Thurston, head of BWC (U.S.A.) coordinated a week of anti-fur protests in New York, with guests Lady Dowding and actress Gretchen Wyler, to coincide with the American International Fur Fair. The effort is remembered as the beginning of the United States anti-fur movement.

Dowding remained director of BWC Ltd until shortly before the educational charitable trust and the cosmetics company became separate organisations in 1980. Dowding resigned as president from BWC in 1981. The BWC (UK) charity closed in 2002.

== BWC today ==
=== BWC Charities ===
Beauty Without Cruelty - India was established by Diana Ratnagar in 1974 as an educational charitable trust, initially focusing on the commercial exploitation of animals for fashion, beauty and household goods. Over the years it has expanded its activities to cover animal cruelty in the name of food, medicine, entertainment, trade, genetic engineering or for any other purpose, through research, fact-finding, investigation through fieldwork, documentation, reports and publication, along with education, creating public awareness, campaigning and lobbying. Their motto is: "Beauty Without Cruelty is a way of life which causes no creature of land, sea or air terror, torture or death".

Beauty Without Cruelty (South Africa) was established in 1975 as an animal issues charity. Its initial focus was animal testing, fur and ivory. It has subsequently expanded to include educating and offering kind options in all areas of animal exploitation. Beauty Without Cruelty is an animal rights organisation with a primary objective to educate and inform the public about the exploitation, abuse and suffering of all animals and to offer humane, non-animal alternatives, to replace cruel and harmful lifestyle choices. They receive no government or lottery funding and rely entirely on the generosity of supporters to continue work for animals. Beauty Without Cruelty means living without cruelty.

=== BWC Cosmetics ===
Beauty Without Cruelty is an independent British company that manufactures vegan cosmetics. The cosmetics contain no animal products, and are not tested on animals and are a certified member of the Vegan Society and Cruelty Free International.

Beauty Without Cruelty is also an independent company in the United States that continues to produce a full line of cruelty-free, vegan skin, body and haircare products.

BWC's products are free of parabens, gluten, S.L.S, PEG, toluene, formaldehyde and phthalates. Although millions of animals are killed each year as a result of animal testing of cosmetics, Beauty Without Cruelty advocates animal rights and argues that the results of animal testing are often unreliable and can not be applied to humans. BWC focuses on vegan and "natural" products that cannot chemically harm humans and do not need to be tested on animals.

BWC has worked to support the Humane Cosmetics Act on its mission to end cosmetic animal testing in the United States.

== Publications ==
Compassion (UK headquarters). Quarterly journal. 1962 - late 1990's.

Compassionate Friend (BWC India). English quarterly journal. 1977 - date.

Karuna-Mitre (BWC India). Hindi quarterly journal. 2011 - date.

More Than Skin Deep (BWC UK). 1966, 1975. Brochure compiling lists of firms and their products entirely free from cruelty to animals.

== See also ==
- List of animal rights advocates
- List of vegetarian and vegan companies
- Testing cosmetics on animals
