= Cruelty-free =

Label regarding animal rights

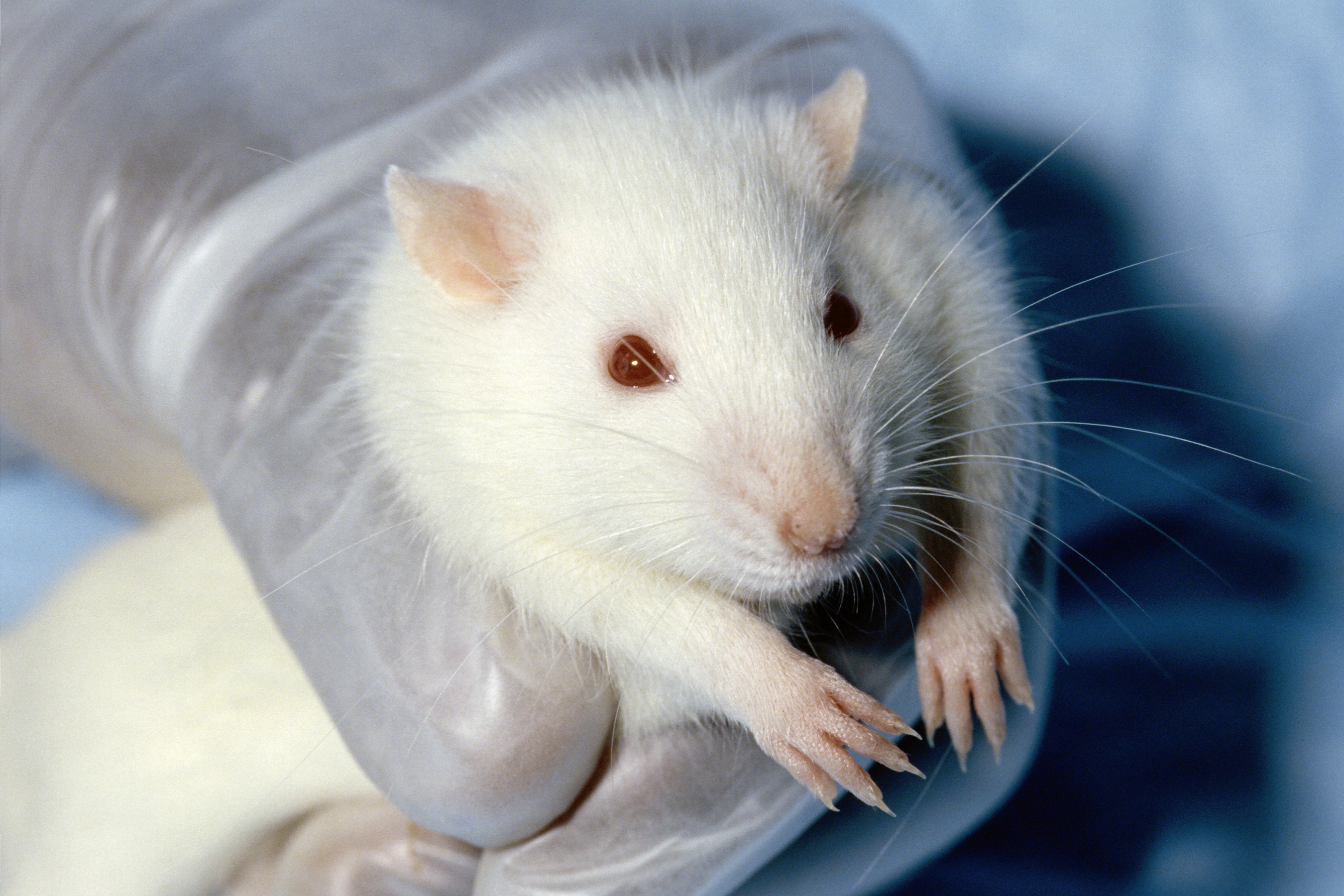
Laboratory rat

In the animal rights movement, cruelty-free is a label for products or activities that do not harm or kill animals anywhere in the world. Products tested on animals or made from animals are not considered cruelty-free, since these tests are often painful and cause the suffering and death of millions of animals every year.

== History ==
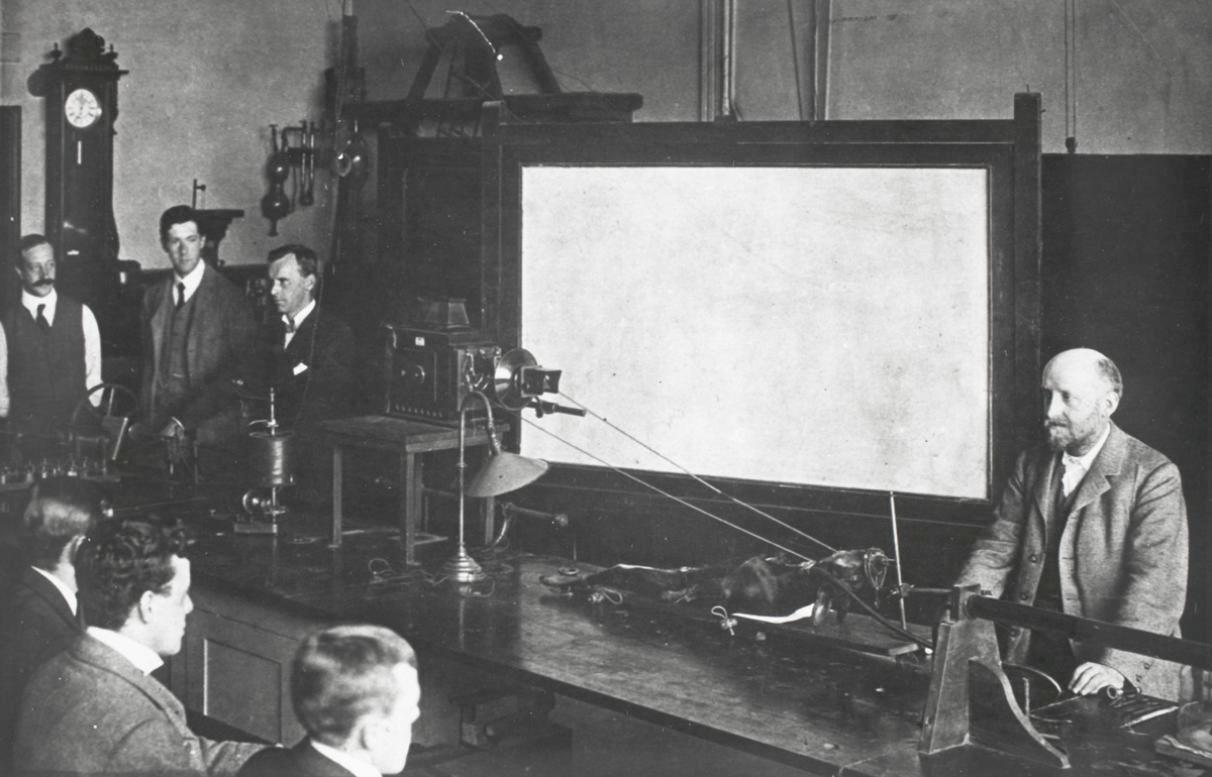
Reconstruction of a 1903 demonstration by William Bayliss, a physiologist at University College London, during which anti-vivisectionists said a dog was vivisected without anaesthetic.

The term cruelty-free was first used in this way by Lady Dowding who persuaded manufacturers of fake furs to use the label Beauty Without Cruelty and went on to found the charity Beauty Without Cruelty in 1959. The term was popularised in the US in the 1970s by Marcia Pearson who founded the group Fashion With Compassion. Then, in 1998, the United Kingdom started a trend by banning all testing on animals. Many other countries followed their lead soon after.

== Campaigns ==
In 1957 Charles Hume and W. M. S. Russell introduced the concept of the three R's in their book Principles of Humane Experimental Technique. These techniques to reduce animals used in tests and their suffering include: replacement (eliminate an animal test altogether), reduction (fewer animals used in test by using statistical analysis) and refinement (making tests less painful).

In 1991 the European Center for the Validation of Alternative Methods (ECVAM) was established "to promote the scientific and regulatory acceptance of alternative methods which are important to the biosciences and which reduce, refine or replace the use of laboratory animals." Once the ECVAM's Scientific Advisory Committee approves a test it must be used under the Animal Protection Act, which does not allow the use of animals when an alternative exists.

In 2012, British Union for the Abolition of Vivisection joined forces with New England Anti-Vivisection Society and the European Coalition to End Animal Experiments to create an international organization to campaign against animal testing. BUAV supporter Ricky Gervais announced the campaign—now considered a deciding factor in the European decision to ban animal testing for personal-care products. Although companies can still use animal testing in countries outside Europe, such as China, which requires animal testing on all imported cosmetics - Note that China now has new legislation in place under CSAR which details methods to enter the Chinese cosmetic market without the need for animal testing. The Leaping Bunny applies to a company's global market, and does not certify product that use animal testing anywhere in the world.

== Tests ==
Animals such as rabbits, rats, mice, and guinea pigs are sometimes forced to eat or inhale substances, or have a cosmetic ingredient rubbed onto their shaved skin, eyes or ears every day for 28 or 90 days to see if they have an allergic reaction. Then they are killed and cut open to examine the effects the ingredient has on internal organs. These tests are also done with pregnant animals who, after much suffering, are killed along with the fetus. In more prolonged carcinogen tests, rats are force-fed a cosmetic ingredient over two years, monitored for cancer, and then killed.

“Typically a young rabbit is tightly constrained in a box so that he is unable to move... Clips sometimes hold his eyelids open. Anesthesia is not generally administered. A researcher applies a concentrated substance to the outer layer of the eye and observes over a span days or weeks for responses such as blindness, bleeding, hemorrhaging and ulceration. At the end, the rabbits are generally killed.”

— Megan Erin Gallagher

Primates, dogs, such as the Beagle, and cats are used for invasive experimentation as well. Many laboratories use these species to test drugs, chemicals, and diseases, whether old or new.

== Alternatives ==
As technology developed, outdated animal testing is being replaced with quicker, cheaper and more accurate methods. Critics point out that humane alternatives can be slow to implement, costly, and test only one compound at a time. Alternatives have shown positive results. For example, reconstructed human epidermis—which uses human skin donated from cosmetic surgery to replace the rabbit Draize skin test—is more relevant to human reactions. Other methods replace the Draize eye test by using in vitro (test-tube) human tissue. Computer-based systems allow for isolation of a select tissue or organ to conduct tests in an extremely controlled environment. These tests not only reduce animal testing, but are more precise and accurate at protecting humans from toxic substances. Another cruelty-free option is using ingredients that have already been established as safe, such as the 20,000 ingredients in the European Union database.

== Products ==
Companies now offer a wide range of cruelty-free products such as cosmetics, personal-care products, household cleaners, clothing, shoes, condoms (which are sometimes processed with casein), and candles (which usually use paraffin or beeswax). Organizations such as PETA, Choose Cruelty Free, Coalition for Consumer Information on Cosmetics, British Union for the Abolition of Vivisection, and its offshoot organization Cruelty Free International have released lists of cruelty-free products and cruel products to boycott. Since the 1990s the Leaping Bunny has been the only international third-party cruelty-free certification program.

It is important to distinguish between cruelty free and vegan products because while it is common for people to use these two terms interchangeably, there are several key differences. Products that are vegan may not necessarily be cruelty free and vice versa. The cruelty free label only guarantees that the final product and ingredients are not tested on animals, but the product can still contain animal derived ingredients. Similarly, the vegan label only guarantees that the product does not contain animal ingredients but may still have been tested on animals.

== Events ==
National Cruelty-Free Week was an event in the United Kingdom every year arranged by the BUAV (now Cruelty Free International). Other, similar, events include: National Vegetarian Week and World Vegan Day, which takes place each year on November 1.

== Criticisms ==
An example of a generic rabbit icon; such icons are often used by manufacturers to intentionally confuse consumers into believing that a product is "cruelty-free".

While some manufacturers have begun to label their products as "not tested on animals", "we do not conduct animal testing", "never tested on animals", "against animal testing" or "cruelty-free", these labels are confusing and potentially misleading, since there is no clear legal definition as to what they mean. Two organizations, Cruelty Free International and People for the Ethical Treatment of Animals, use rabbit icons to verify products as "cruelty-free", resulting in some manufacturers using rabbit icons to intentionally deceive customers into believing that their products do not use animal testing. The symbol of a rabbit is commonly understood by consumers as verifying a product as "cruelty-free", but most consumers cannot easily distinguish the CFI and PETA rabbit logos from other rabbit icons.

== See also ==
- Animal liberationist
- Animal rights
- Animal welfare
- Ethical consumerism
- Veganism
