= Bruce Dowding =

Allied intelligence operative (1914–1943)

Kenneth Bruce Dowding (4 May 1914 – 30 June 1943) was an Australian who worked for the British Directorate of Military Intelligence as a MI9 agent and was involved in the French Resistance during World War II under the alias of "André Mason". He was the brother of Keith Dowding and the uncle of Peter Dowding.

== Early life ==
Dowding was born in Melbourne, Australia, the youngest son of John McCallum Dowding and Margaret Kate Dowding (née Walsh). He was raised in the Presbyterian Church, and attended Glenhuntly State School before winning scholarships to Caulfield Grammar School and Wesley College. He matriculated with honours in French and British history. From 1933 to 1937 Dowding was employed as a student teacher at Wesley while gaining registration as a teacher and studying French at the University of Melbourne.

In January 1938, Dowding left Australia and travelled through the South Seas and Panama Canal to Marseille and Paris, where he had enrolled to undertake a course in French language and civilisation at the Sorbonne. On completion of this course, he stayed in France and worked as a translator, tutor and English teacher. He also took informal lessons in Spanish.

== World War II ==
A committed Francophile, Dowding bypassed opportunities to return home as tensions mounted in Europe. During the Phoney War he volunteered as an interpreter in the Royal Army Service Corps and was posted to Boulogne. He was captured during the Battle of France on 23 May 1940 but eventually escaped from Frontstalag 151 at Montargis during the Battle of France. By the end of August 1940 he was interned at Fort Saint-Jean, Marseille, which had a liberal parole system that enabled servicemen to move freely around the city. Dowding became a friend of Donald Caskie, Nancy Wake and Elisabeth Furse, and became involved in early attempts to exfiltrate servicemen from Vichy France.

This work fell under the purview of MI9 and, when Captain Ian Garrow was approved as leader of the Marseille-based escape and evasion organisation (later known as the Pat O'Leary Line), Dowding became Garrow's second-in-command. Throughout 1941, Dowding managed the Marseille-Perpignan part of the line. As part of that work, he liaised with a Toulouse-based group of Spanish exiles under the leadership of Francisco Ponzán Vidal, which provided the guides necessary to help servicemen cross the Pyrenees. When Albert Guérisse (Pat O'Leary) joined the escape line in June 1941, Dowding impressed him as having "lived for years in the south of France, spoke perfect French, combined a deep interest in music with the physique of a policeman, and had become one of the most active and daring members of the organisation".

Soon after Dowding's arrival in Marseille, he also met Varian Fry, Albert O. Hirschman and others working for the Emergency Rescue Committee to help leading European intellectuals, artists and writers, mostly Jewish, escape from persecution by Nazi Germany and reach the USA. From April 1941, Dowding resided in the same Perpignan hotel utilised by this group. In both Marseille and Perpignan, Dowding became associated with many involved in the French Resistance including Louis Nouveau, George Rodocanachi, Roland Lepers, Daniel Bénédite, Denyse Clairouin and Paulette Gastou.

After Garrow's arrest in October 1941, Dowding continued as second-in-command to Pat O'Leary. On 1 November 1941, he was present when O'Leary confronted and dismissed fellow agent Harold Cole over the misappropriation of funds. Cole had been based in Lille, managing the northern end of the line, and Dowding was appointed to take his place. He won the confidence of many celebrated figures in the French Resistance in Pas-de-Calais, including Pierre Carpentier at the strategic location of Abbeville.

In December 1941, Cole was arrested by the Abwehr. Subsequently described as "the worst traitor of the war", Cole helped the Germans arrest dozens of French Resistants including helpers of the Pat O'Leary Line. Dowding was arrested at Burbure on the same day Carpentier was arrested at Abbeville. He was held as a political prisoner under the Nacht und Nebel decree at Loos-lès-Lille Prison until his transfer to a sub-camp of the Buchenwald concentration camp at Bochum. While there, Dowding survived Allied bombing during the Battle of the Ruhr.

== Trial and execution ==
Dowding was tried with seven French nationals by the People's Court of the Third Reich on 4 March 1943. The public prosecutor charged the group with working "continuously and at times together" with the aim of "causing a disadvantage to the war power of the Reich"; passing information to the enemy or a third party for the use of the enemy; and engaging in espionage activities to assist Allied servicemen. On 16 April 1943, Dowding, Carpentier, Désiré Didry, Protais Dubois and Marcel Duhayon were sentenced to death.

Dowding and his co-sentenced were transferred to Dortmund prison on 29 June 1943. He was beheaded on 30 June 1943 and interred in an unmarked grave in Dortmund cemetery. His remains were later moved to the Reichswald Forest War Cemetery near Kleve.

== Posthumous recognition ==
On 29 August 1946, a supplement to The London Gazette stated that Dowding had been mentioned in despatches for "gallant and distinguished services in the field." He was also issued with a Certificate of Appreciation by Le Bureau de Recherches sur l'Aide apportee aux Evades Allies.

By 12 February 1948, the Ministry of Foreign Affairs of the Fourth French Republic had sought clearance from the Australian Government to confer the Legion of Honour on Dowding. Australia's Prime Minister's Department responded that Dowding had not been a member of the Australian armed forces and failed to pursue the matter. As of 2023, the Australian government has not changed its position.

Dowding is among those memorialised in the Steinwache memorial museum, established in 1992.
