= Doctors Against Animal Experiments =

Animal rights organization based in Cologne

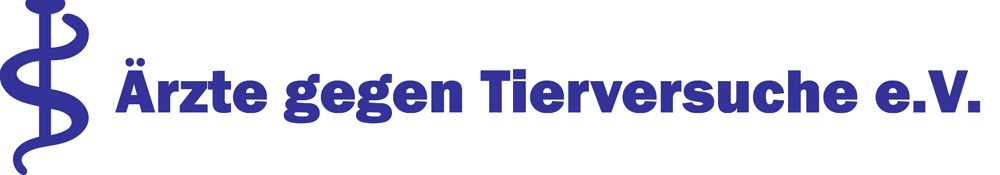
- Founded: 1979; 47 years ago
- Type: NGO
- Purpose: Abolition of all animal experiments
- Region served: Europe
- Members: 993 members 2762 sustaining members (as of April 8th 2023)
- Leader: Andreas Ganz (chairman)
- Key people: Claus Kronaus, Dr. Melanie Seiler, Dr. Tamara Zietek (directing managers)
- Revenue: 965.000 (2022)
- Employees: 22 (2023)
- Website: www.aerzte-gegen-tierversuche.de/en/

Doctors Against Animal Experiments

Doctors Against Animal Experiments (DAAE; Ärzte gegen Tierversuche) is an animal rights organization based in Cologne, which campaigns for the complete abolition of animal testing under the motto "Medical progress is important - animal testing is the wrong way".

== Foundation and mode of operation ==
The organization was founded in 1979 by the neurologist couple Margot and Herbert Stiller along with other doctors in Hamburg. Two years earlier, Mr. and Mrs. Stiller had already published the book "Animal Experiment and Animal Experimenters". They were among the first to question animal experiments from a scientific point of view and to shed light on the harm that animal experiments cause to humans. Educating the public about the methodological fallacy of animal testing has been the focus of the association from the very beginning. In the pre-digital era, the board members and active members mainly shared publications, wrote letters to decision-makers, gave lectures both in Germany and abroad, published books and articles, and answered questions from the media. In 1990, the first edition of the book "The Myth of Animal Testing" by Dr. Bernhard Rambeck was published. The author dispels and refutes the ten most common reasons repeatedly put forward for animal experiments. The core of the association’s work raising awareness for animal testing and educating the public on the multiple fallacies of the system. Their publications, campaigns, and projects are based on in-depth research by a team of scientists. In addition to educating the public, DAAE also organizes its own congresses, gives lectures to interested specialist audiences, connects with political decision-makers, and takes legal action on behalf of animals in laboratories. Their numerous nationwide working groups propagate the association’s standpoints and research by regularly organising information stalls, action days, and demonstrations.

== Members ==
According to its own information, the association has around 3,750 members and sustaining members. Just under a quarter are members (doctors, veterinarians, dentists, psychologists, and scientists working in the medical field) and around three quarters are sustaining members. The association works independently of the interests of the pharmaceutical industry and universities and is financed exclusively by donations and membership fees.

== Goals ==
The organization rejects all animal experiments on ethical and scientific grounds. They argue that animal experiments are not suitable for investigating human diseases and that, from a scientific point of view, it is not possible to transfer the results from animal experiments to humans. As an alternative, the association propagates the use of non-animal research methods such as human cell cultures, mini-organs generated from human cells (organoids), multi-organ chips, computer simulations, and clinical studies, which are superior to animal experiments in terms of informative value and transferability.

== Campaigns and projects ==
Database on animal experiments Since 1998, the association has been operating a database that documents examples of animal experiments in Germany. For this purpose, articles published in scientific journals are evaluated and the animal experiments described therein are summarized in a language that is understandable for laypersons. The aim of the database is to give the public an insight into the reality of animal experiments.

== NAT Database ==
In order to avoid animal testing and promote animal-free research, the association published the NAT (Non-Animal-Technologies) database on animal-free research methods on July 29, 2020 with 250 entries at the time. The database currently (as of December 2023) contains almost 1,900 entries. According to the association, conventional literature databases are still dominated by research that uses animals while non-animal methods are drowning in a flood of animal testing studies. The association says that the full potential of modern human-based research methods has not yet been exploited - countless animals continue to suffer and die in animal experiments, even though suitable animal-free methods exist. DAAE has created the bilingual NAT (Non Animal Technologies) database to close this gap between the enormous number of animal-free methods available on the one hand and the difficulty of finding them on the other. The freely available database includes a wide variety of non-animal methods from all over the world, ranging from modern methods based on human cells to complex computer models. The NAT database supports scientists in their search for animal-free methods for their respective research questions, but is also intended for politicians, representatives of authorities, journalists, and the interested public. The search mask allows a keyword search as well as the possibility to filter by subject area, model, country, or date of publication. The entries contain a summary of the method as well as related sources and information on the responsible researchers and institutes.

== Herbert-Stiller-Prize ==
In order to encourage animal-free human medical research, particularly among younger doctors and scientists, the association has established the Herbert Stiller Prize, a research and promotional prize. The prize, named after the co-founder of the association, Herbert Stiller, is awarded for innovative scientific work that uses animal-free, human-based methods to research and treat human diseases and, thus, makes a significant contribution to medical progress. This includes in-vitro studies, but also clinical work and epidemiological investigations into the causes of diseases of civilization. The prize was first awarded in 1995 and was endowed with DM 25,000 at the time. By 2001, five scientists had received this award, and two more received the doctoral prize worth DM 10,000. In 2006-2011, three prizes of €10,000 each were awarded with a focus on animal-free cancer research. Since 2019, the Herbert Stiller Prize has been awarded every two years.

== Heart of Stone ==
The association also awards a negative prize. The "Heart of Stone" stands for heartless research in which sentient beings are degraded to mere measuring instruments. Public online voting is used to draw attention to some particularly absurd and cruel animal experiments that have been carried out in Germany.

The negative prize has been awarded annually since 2017. The following institutions have received the "Heart of Stone":

- 2017 - Max Delbrück Centre Berlin for asphyxiation experiments on naked mole rats and mice.
- 2018 - University of Ulm for smoking experiments on mice, in which the animals had to inhale the smoke of up to 8 cigarettes 5 days a week for 3 weeks.
- 2020 - University Hospital of Saarland Homburg/Saar for experiments on mice with so-called dorsal skin chambers. The dorsal skin of mice is clamped between two metal frames like a sandwich and a hole is cut in the skin so that small blood vessels can be observed in the awake animal.
- 2021 - Carl von Ossietzky University of Oldenburg for experiments on songbirds in which holes are drilled into the skulls of wild-caught animals.
- 2022 - Polyclinic for Dental Surgery at Heinrich Heine University Düsseldorf for experiments in which numerous teeth are extracted from beagle dogs and implants are inserted into the holes.
- 2023 – Neurophysics research group at University of Marburg for brain research experiments on rhesus monkeys, in which the animals are forced by thirst to sit with their heads fixed while electrodes are inserted into the brain via boreholes in the skull.

== Campaign against brain research on monkeys ==
Since 2009, the association had been campaigning against brain research on rhesus monkeys at four institutes in Tübingen. In 2014, one of them, the Max Planck Institute for Biological Cybernetics, hit the headlines when recordings were published showing severe mistreatment of the monkeys. Doctors Against Animal Experiments filed a criminal complaint with the public prosecutor's office in Tübingen in January 2015. Following those revelations, Marco Wehr accused the association of a lack of proximity to players in medical research and of insufficient expertise in a guest article in the FAZ in 2017. Among others, he criticized DAAE for campaigning for replacement of animal experiments with cell cultures and computer models, as these could only inadequately reproduce complex biological processes and were therefore, in his opinion, insufficient for researching longer chains of action. In December 2018, Volkart Wildermuth announced in an interview that the trust between the Logothetis working group and the Max Planck Society had permanently been damaged. According to Wildermuth, the MGP had restricted some of Nikos Logothetis' management functions where animal experiments were concerned. The public prosecutor's office in Tübingen discontinued the proceedings against payment of a fine.

In 2022, autopsy reports from the Stuttgart Chemical and Veterinary Investigation Office from 2009 were published. They showed that the skulls of monkeys that had been experimented on in Tübingen had numerous drill holes and a fracture, among other things. A total of six monkey cadavers were delivered from Tübingen, three with and three without heads. According to the autopsy reports, the skull manipulations caused much more suffering to the animals than is legally permitted in animal experiments.

== Eastern Europe Project – Saving Animals with Computers ==
In 2008, the association launched its Eastern Europe project, initially providing animal-free teaching materials to an institute at Sumy University in Ukraine. As part of the project, participating university institutes sign agreements to discontinue the use of animals in the relevant courses and in return receive equipment and teaching materials for animal-free education. These include laptops, projectors, computer simulations and films. By August 2026, according to the association, agreements had been concluded with 86 institutes in 35 cities in Ukraine, Russia, Belarus, Kyrgyzstan, Kazakhstan, and Uzbekistan. The association stated that the participating institutions' transition to animal-free teaching saved around 62,000 animals from use in university education each year. The association has also financed the development of Russian- and Ukrainian-language educational films and computer simulations and raises public awareness through press conferences and media reports.

== Botox campaign ==
In 2007, Doctors Against Animal Experiments launched a campaign against the LD50 test which is executed on mice for batch testing botulinum toxin products. The neurotoxin, known under the trade name "Botox", is used for both medical and cosmetic purposes. Each individual production unit is tested on mice to determine at which dilution half of the animals die. Years of campaigning led to the three most important manufacturers switching to animal-free testing methods, at least for the most part, from 2011 onwards

== REACH Project ==
Since 2009, the association has been campaigning for animal-free chemical testing, together with the umbrella organization European Coalition to End Animal Experiments ([ECEAE]). As part of the REACH regulation (Registration, Evaluation, Authorization and Restriction of Chemicals), chemical companies must register their chemicals with the EU authority ECHA and submit extensive information. This may be existing data or data obtained from new animal tests. Planned animal tests must be proposed to the ECHA. The authority then gives third parties 45 days in a public consultation process to find out whether the data already exists or can be obtained by other means than animal testing. In cooperation with the ECEAE, experts from the association comment on the REACH test proposals and research existing information on the chemicals in question. Most of the substances have been on the market for more than 30 years and most have already been tested in the past. According to the association, these comments on REACH proposals alone could prevent animal testing on around 140,000 animals by May 2023.

== Monument for animal rights and against animal testing ==
The memorial was erected on April 29, 2023 at the "Kreuz & Quer" church in the middle of Erlangen. It stands for the millions of animals that are exploited by humans worldwide, especially in animal experiments. The monument was initiated by Margrit Vollertsen-Diewerge, head of the association's working group in Erlangen and financed by private donations. The memorial was created by sculptor Monika Ritter with administrative authorization. The creative process was preceded by a request for proposal for an artistic work that shows the suffering of defenceless creatures, but at the same time creates a memorial to the living creature in cooperation with the association and the Erlangen Cultural Office. A six-member jury selected Monika Ritter's design out of six applications.

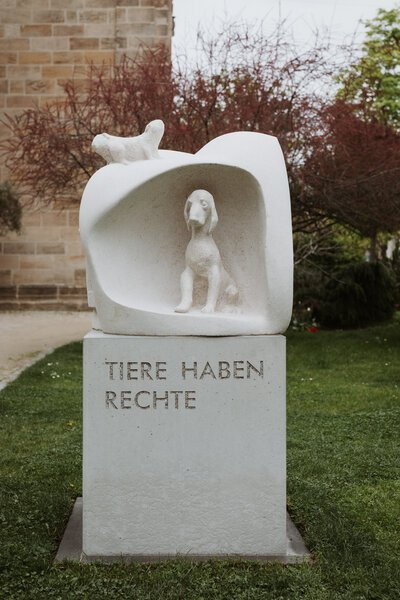

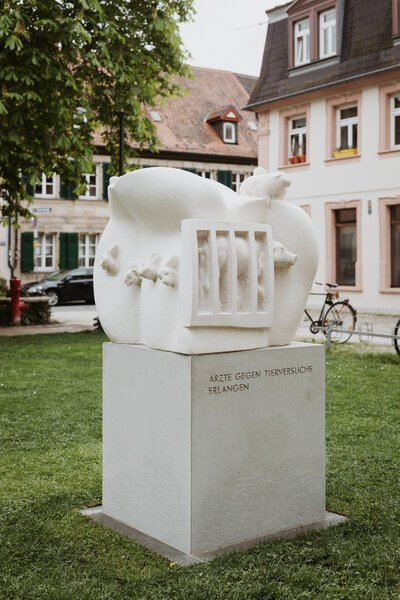

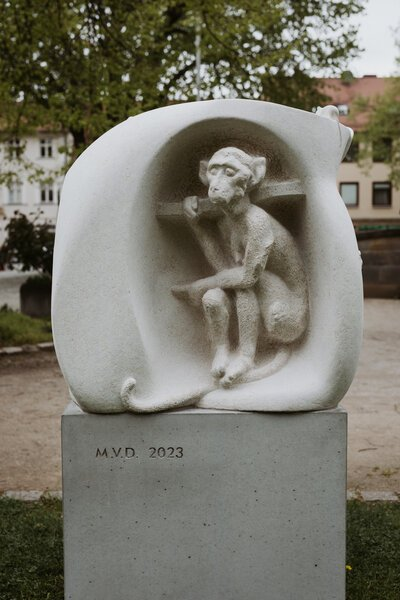

The memorial is made of Croatian Kanfanar stone. It shows a monkey trapped by the neck in a so-called primate chair, as used in brain research, a beagle, the most common dog breed used in animal experiments, a pig behind bars, four rabbits looking out of the stone as if cramped in restraints, two guinea pigs, and a mouse, the animals that suffer and die most frequently in animal experiments.

== Campaigns against the construction of new animal testing laboratories ==
The association is committed to preventing that new animal testing laboratories are built and demands that the corresponding funds flow into animal-free research. Among other things, DAAE launched campaigns against the construction of a research centre of the pharmaceutical company Boehringer Ingelheim in Hanover, new animal laboratories of the Max Delbrück Centre and the Charité in Berlin, an animal testing laboratory of the University of Freiburg, the resumption of animal experiments at the Nordklinikum Nuremberg, a new animal experimentation laboratory at the University Medical Centre Hamburg-Eppendorf, and the establishment of an animal experimentation laboratory in the city of Augsburg, which had previously been free of animal-testing facilities.

== Mouse mobile ==
From 2015 to 2018, the association operated the so-called "mouse mobile", i.e. a van with a large model of a mouse on the roof, and a painted message and a screen in the rear. The information vehicle toured a total of 144 cities in Germany in 2015/2016. In 2017/2018, the mouse mobile was still in use occasionally.

== Awards ==
For the NAT database, which enables researchers to search for animal-free methods, the association was awarded the Lush Prize, endowed with £25,000 from the British cosmetics company, and the Lower Saxony Animal Welfare Prize in 2022.

== Memberships ==
The association is a member of the European Coalition to End Animal Experiments based in Austria and the Eurogroup for Animals based in Brussels.

== Transparency ==
The association has joined the Transparent Civil Society Initiative, an initiative for transparency of non-profit organizations by Transparency International.

== See also ==
- Human-Animal Studies
