= Vincent Orange (historian) =

New Zealand airpower historian (1935–2012)

- Born: 24 September 1935; Shildon, County Durham, England
- Died: 26 November 2012 (aged 77); Christchurch, New Zealand
- Occupations: Historian; Lecturer

Academic background
- Education: University of Hull (PhD)

Academic work
- Institutions: University of Canterbury
- Notable students: Joel Hayward
- Main interests: Military Aviation

George Vincent Orange (24 September 1935 — 26 November 2012) was a British-born New Zealand historian of military aviation. A lecturer at the University of Canterbury for many years up until his retirement in 2002, he wrote several biographies of senior Royal Air Force officers, including Hugh Dowding and Keith Park. He was also involved in academic controversy through his supervision of a student that produced a master's thesis denying some aspects of the Holocaust.

== Biography ==
George Vincent Orange was born on 24 September 1935 in Shildon in County Durham, England. He was educated at St. Mary's Grammar School in nearby Darlington. He then served in the Royal Air Force from 1953 to 1956, after which he went to the University of Hull. Graduating with a Doctor of Philosophy, he emigrated to New Zealand in 1962, where he took up a position lecturing in history at the University of Canterbury in Christchurch. His academic interests was the medieval period and the First and Second World Wars. He was considered to be a popular lecturer, teaching in an engaging style.

Orange authored numerous articles and conference papers in addition to several books, primarily biographies of senior officers of the Royal Air Force. His subjects included Hugh Dowding and Keith Park, both of whom played prominent roles in the Battle of Britain as well as Johnny Checketts, a New Zealand flying ace. He also contributed several biographical essays to the Oxford Dictionary of National Biography.

In 2000, Orange's supervision of a master's student, Joel Hayward, was the subject of academic and media attention. The resulting thesis, written by Hayward in 1993 but embargoed until 1999 and for which he received an A+ grade, was determined to deny some aspects of the Holocaust. The New Zealand Jewish Council had sought revocation of Hayward's master's degree but after an investigation, the University of Canterbury found it had no powers to do so. The investigation found that while the thesis should have not been awarded such a high mark, a degree could only be revoked upon evidence of dishonesty. It could find no such evidence. The university issued an apology for accepting the thesis. Orange, who had defended his supervision of Hayward during the investigation, later commented on the lack of expertise on Holocaust revisionism among the members of the inquiry.

After 40 years of teaching at the University of Canterbury, Orange retired in 2002, by which time he was a reader. He later lectured at the New Zealand Defence Force's Command and Staff College. He died on 26 November 2012 and was survived by his wife and two step-children. His last book, exploring the relationship between Prime Minister Winston Churchill and the senior command of the Royal Air Force, was released posthumously by the publishing company Grub Street. It received praise for "offering a readable and at times insightful account of Britain’s leading airmen" but noted that its discussion of Bomber Command's air offensive "seems inadequate".

== Selected publications ==
His published titles include:

- Churchill and His Airmen: Relationships, Intrigue and Policy Making 1914-1945, (Grub Street, March 2013)
- Dowding of Fighter Command: Victor of the Battle of Britain, (Grub Street, September 2008)
- Slessor: Bomber Champion - The Life of Sir John Slessor, (Grub Street, October 2006)
- Tedder: Quietly in Command, (Routledge, April 2004)
- Winged Promises: History of No.14 Squadron, RAF 1915-1945, (Weidenfeld & Nicolson, November 1998)
- Ensor's Endeavour: A Biography of Wing Commander Mick Ensor, (Grub Street, May 1994)
- Coningham: A Biography of Sir Arthur Coningham, (Methuen, February 1990)
- Johnny Checketts: The Road to Biggin Hill, (Airlife, February 1987; re-published by Grub Street in an updated edition, March 2007)
- Park: The Biography of Air Chief Marshal Sir Keith Park, (Methuen, August 1984)
