= Fienvillers =

- Commune
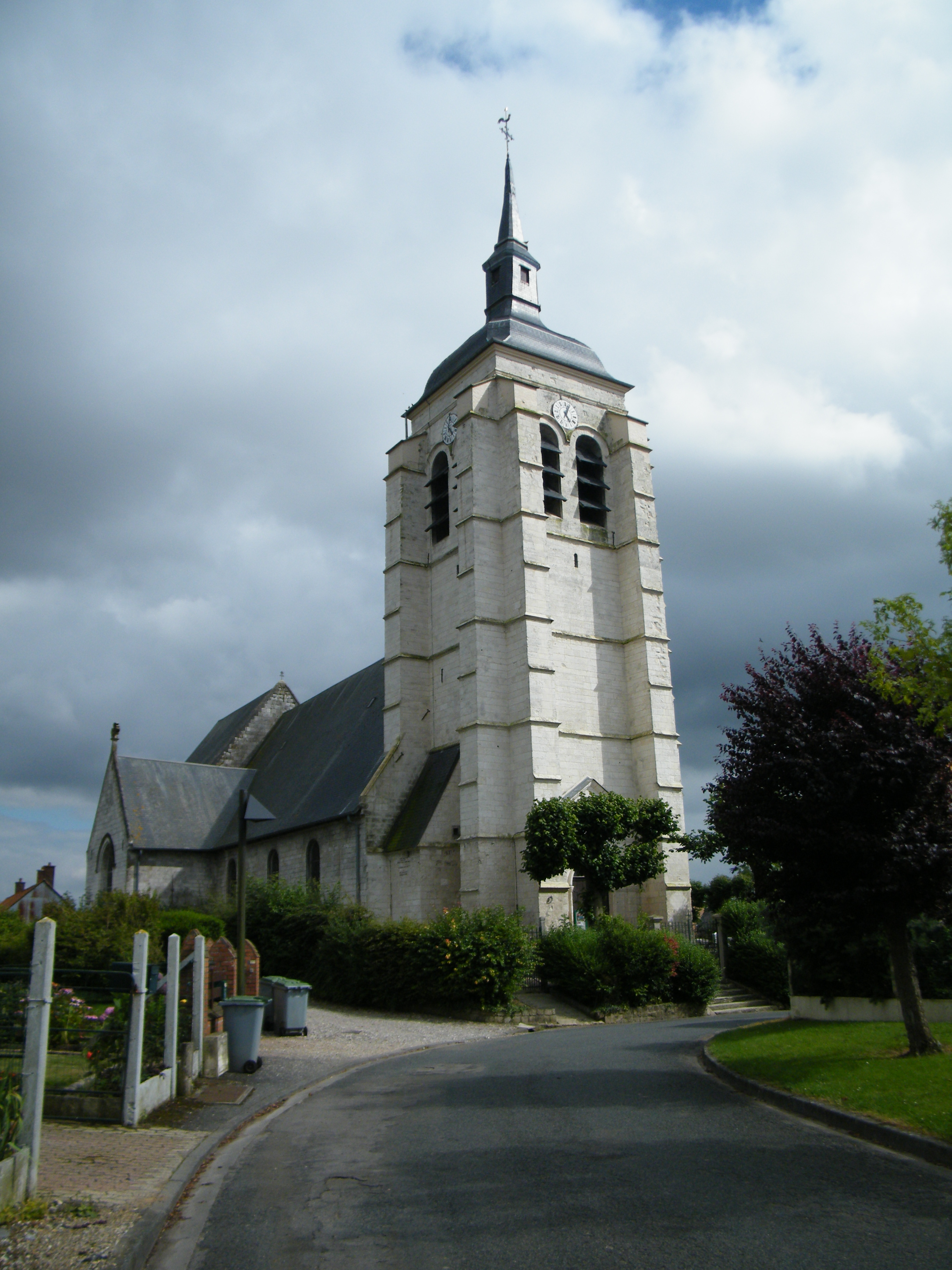
- The church in Fienvillers
- Location of Fienvillers
- Location within France Location within Hauts-de-France
- Coordinates: 50°07′09″N 2°13′45″E
- Country: France
- Region: Hauts-de-France
- Department: Somme
- Arrondissement: Amiens
- Canton: Doullens
- Intercommunality: CC Territoire Nord Picardie

Government
  - Mayor (2020–2026): Alain Roussel
- Area^{1}: 11.69 km^{2} (4.51 sq mi)
- Elevation: 153 m (502 ft)
- Highest elevation: 167 m (548 ft)
- Lowest elevation: 97 m (318 ft)
- Population (2023): 663
  - Density: 56.7/km^{2} (147/sq mi)
- Time zone: UTC+01:00 (CET)
  - Summer (DST): UTC+02:00 (CEST)
- INSEE/Postal code: 80310 /80750
- ^{1} French Land Register data, which excludes lakes, ponds, glaciers > 1 km^{2} (0.386 sq mi or 247 acres) and river estuaries.

Fienvillers (Picard: Fienvileu) is a commune in the Somme department in Hauts-de-France in northern France.

== Geography ==
Fienvillers is situated at the junction of the D59, D31 and D925 roads, some 16 miles (26 km) east of Abbeville.

== Population ==
Historical population
Year	Pop.	±% p.a.
1968	534	—
1975	553	+0.50%
1982	558	+0.13%
1990	523	−0.81%
1999	548	+0.52%
2007	569	+0.47%
2012	673	+3.41%
2017	686	+0.38%
2023	663	−0.57%
Source: INSEE

== See also ==
- Communes of the Somme department
