= Steinwache =

Memorial museum in Dortmund, Germany

Coordinates: 51.5196°N 7.4606°E

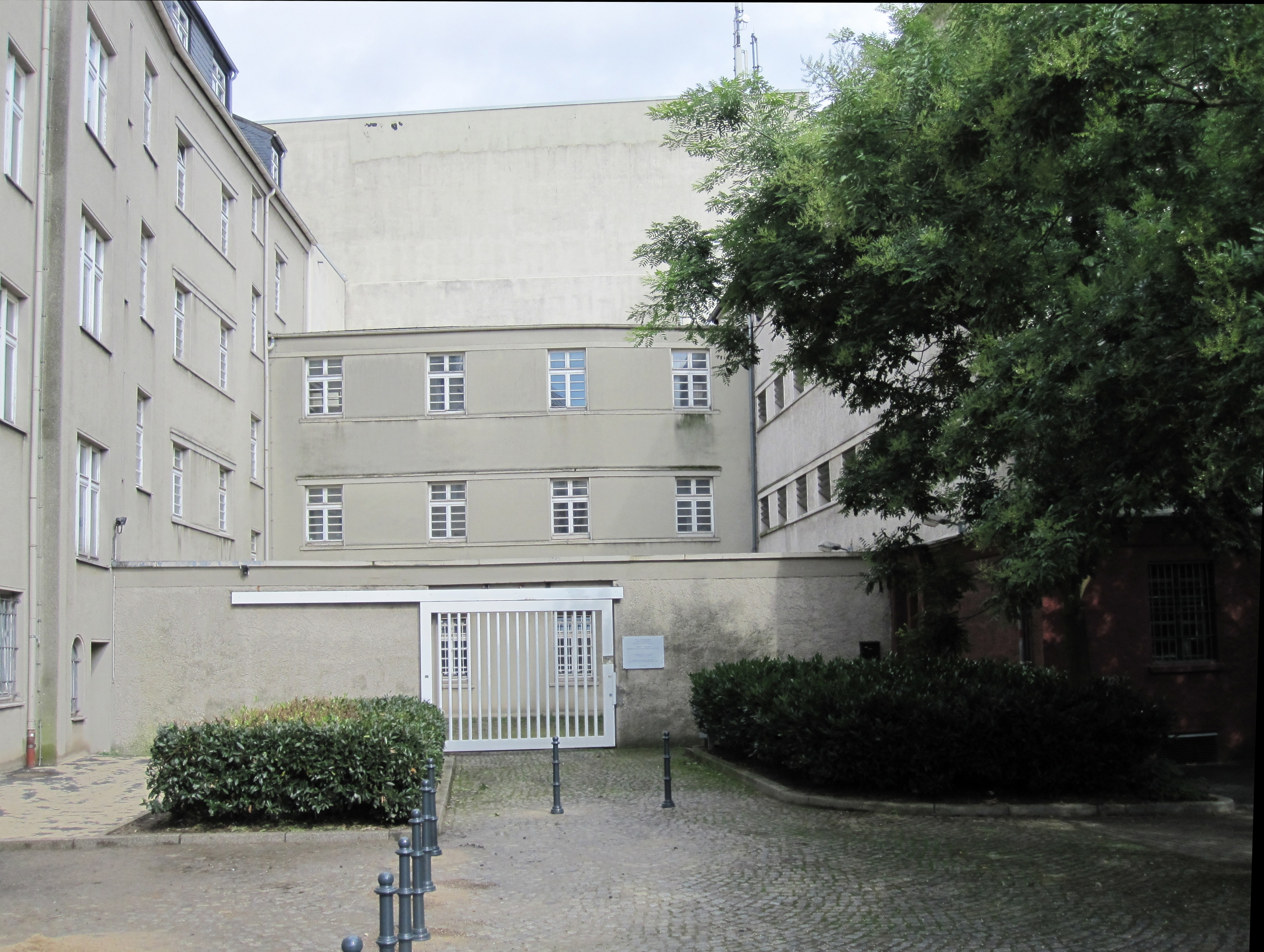
Entrance to the memorial site

The Steinwache is a memorial museum in Dortmund, Germany, to victims of Nazi ideology and policy.

The police station Steinwache was established in 1906. Since 1928 a prison next to the station was in use for detention of suspects. In 1933 the Gestapo took over the prison and imprisoned and tortured many opponents of the Nazi regime. It soon had a reputation as Die Hölle von Westdeutschland ("The hell of western Germany"). Between 1933 and 1945 more than 66,000 people were imprisoned in the Steinwache prison. In the early years of the regime the inmates were primarily members of the communist and social democratic opposition. During World War II foreign forced laborers made up the largest group of prisoners. Especially slave workers from eastern Europe were often badly treated and many of them were executed.

In contrast to most of Dortmund's city center, the Steinwache was not heavily damaged during the war. The prison remained in its original use until it was closed in 1958, when it was converted to a shelter for the homeless. The building was scheduled for demolition in 1976, but was saved as a memorial. The conversion of the former prison into a memorial site began in the 1980s. In 1992, the permanent location of the exhibition Widerstand und Verfolgung in Dortmund 1933–1945 ("Resistance and Persecution in Dortmund 1933-1945") was opened. The exhibition shares the history of persecution under National Socialism through photographs, short texts, and occasional reports from contemporary witnesses.

In 2019, an architectural competition was held to develop new designs to expand the museum's exhibition space. In 2025, renovations and rebuilding is taking place at the site to expand the facility.
