= European Coalition to End Animal Experiments =

European animal rights organization

The European Coalition to End Animal Experiments (ECEAE) is a European umbrella organisation based in Cologne, Germany. It is actively operating in favour of animal rights and in particularly, an abolishment of testing on animals. The ECEAE was created in 1990 as an umbrella association for national organisations working for the abolition of all animal experiments. The original aim was to reach a ban on the testing of cosmetics on animals. Later, other campaign objectives were added, including banning experiments on non-human primates, in the field of regulatory animal testing and animal tests for botulinum toxin, better known as botox.

In order to achieve these goals, the ECEAE releases publications, organizes violent free actions and campaigns and lobbies in the European Parliament, the European Commission and other relevant EU bodies. The ECEAE was one of the initiators of the successful European Citizens’ Initiative ‘Save Cruelty Free Cosmetics – Commit to a Europe Without Animal Testing’ which collected more than 1.2 million signatures in 2021/2022. The ECEAE currently consists of 19 member organisation.

== Members ==
- ADDA: - Asociación Defensa Derechos Animal Adda Ong (Spain)
- Animal Rights (Belgium)
- Anima Mundi (North Macedonia)
- Comité scientifique Pro Anima Pour une recherche sans expérimentation animale (France)
- Animalkind (Sweden)
- Ärztinnen und Ärzte für Tierschutz in der Medizin (Switzerland)
- Doctors Against Animal Experiments (Germany)
- Safer Medicines (Great Britain)
- Society for the Protection of Animals and development of Civic Consciousness (Serbia)
- Forsøgsdyrenes Værn - Danish Society for the Protection of Laboratory Animals (Denmark)
- IBT – Internationaler Bund der Tierversuchsgegner (Austria)
- IAVS - Irish Anti-Vivisection Society (Ireland)
- LAV - Lega Anti Vivisezione (Italy)
- LSCV - Ligue Suisse contre l’expérimentation animale et pour les droits des animaux (Switzerland)
- Menschen für Tierrechte - Bundesverband der Tierversuchsgegner e.V.
- One Voice (France)
- OSA – Oltre la Sperimentazione Animale (Italy)
- Prijatelji životinja - Animal Friends Croatia (Croatia)
- Tierschutz Austria (Austria)
