= Keith Dowding (activist) =

Australian minister and left-wing activist

Keith McCallum Dowding AM (21 July 1911 – 26 August 2008) was an Australian Presbyterian minister and left-wing activist who was the father of Western Australian Premier Peter Dowding.

Dowding was born in Melbourne to John McCallum Dowding and Margaret Katherine Welch. Keith was the older brother of MI9 agent Bruce Dowding. He attended Melbourne University, graduating with a Bachelor of Arts, and in 1939 was ordained a Presbyterian minister. Also in that year he married Marjorie Darcy and was sent home from his army chaplaincy in New Guinea after questioning the differences in treatment between officers and troops and his Christian burial of a Japanese pilot. He re-enrolled as a private and worked in the Japanese language division of the army. Following a period as minister in Murrumbeena, he worked in Scotland with George MacLeod. Marjorie died during this period, survived by the couple's eight-year-old son, Peter.

In 1951, he returned to Australia, where he married Marjorie Lazarus, a Jewish widow. The couple settled in Woollahra, where the Dowding manse became a central meeting place for the Australian Labor Party's left faction, including Les Haylen, Eddie Ward and H. V. Evatt. Dowding was also involved in the Petrov Affair, becoming the confidant and spiritual advisor of Alan Dalziel, one of Evatt's staffers who was accused of being a Soviet spy. Following Dalziel's acquittal, Dowding moved to Perth, becoming minister at Ross Memorial Church. He ran as the Labor candidate for Swan in 1958, but by 1961 his views were outside the Labor mainstream and he was expelled from the party in 1962 for opposing the White Australia policy.

Dowding was later readmitted to the Labor Party, becoming its senior WA vice-president and a life member; he was also readmitted to the Returned Services League, which had expelled him in 1953 for "alleged communist leanings". He was a campaigner for a wide variety of causes, serving as president of the Western Australian Council for Civil Liberties, convener of People for Nuclear Disarmament, president of the Western Australian branch of Amnesty International, founder of Freedom from Hunger in WA, chairman of the Refugee Task Force and West Australians for Racial Equality, and national vice-president of the United Nations Association of Australia. He and his second wife divorced and he remarried Jane Hutchison, an Anglo-Indian nurse he met in Nigeria working with the Save the Children Fund, in the 1960s.

He died in August 2008.
