= Muriel Dowding =

English animal activist (1908–1993)

The Right Honourable The Lady Dowding
- Muriel Dowding, in 1953, in her fake fur robes for the coronation of Elizabeth II
- Born: Muriel Albino; 22 March 1908; London, England
- Died: 20 November 1993 (aged 85); Hove, England
- Occupation: Animal rights activist
- Spouses: Jack Maxwell Whiting (m. 1935; died 1944) Hugh Dowding (m. 1951; died 1970)
- Children: 1

Muriel Dowding, Baroness Dowding (née Albino; other married name Whiting; 22 March 1908 – 20 November 1993) was an English humanitarian and animal rights activist known for championing anti-vivisection, vegetarianism and the improvement of animal welfare. Like her second husband Lord Dowding, 1st Baron Dowding she was a vegetarian, an anti-vivisectionist, spiritualist and theosophist. She coined the term cruelty-free and was a pioneer of the cruelty-free movement.

In 1959, Dowding founded the charity Beauty Without Cruelty (BWC) and Beauty Without Cruelty Cosmetics (BWC Ltd) in 1963, to highlight the suffering of animals in the fur and cosmetic trade and led the way in the commercial production of synthetic alternatives to fur and cruelty-free cosmetics. She was a president of the National Anti-Vivisection Society (NAVS) and vice-president of the Royal Society for the Prevention of Cruelty to Animals (RSPCA). In 1969, she cofounded the International Association against Painful Experiments on Animals (IAAPEA).

== Early life and marriage ==
Dowding was born Muriel Albino in Paddington, London, the eldest of two daughters of John Angelo Albino (whose family came from the Province of Como, Italy) and Hilda Gertrude Albino (née Barnes). Her first school was Mr Thomas’ School for the Sons of Gentlemen, in Porchester Terrace, London and she was the only girl in the school. Her parents separated when she was 8 and later divorced and she went to live with family friends, returning to her mother aged 15. She had an unconventional childhood and was greatly influenced by her mother’s theosophical and spiritualist views who, as a vegetarian, an astrologer and a trained spiritual healer, held a weekly prayer healing circle at their home which Dowding and her sister Kathleen (Tottie) joined. Like her mother, she went on to become a Lecture Secretary of the Theosophical Society in Tunbridge Wells, set up her own absent healing circle and became involved with the White Eagle Lodge, a spiritualist association, becoming close to its founder Grace Cooke with shared ideals about non-violence to all animal life.

Dowding married her first husband, Jack Maxwell Whiting (Max) in 1935. They had one son, David Maxwell, born in 1938, during which Dowding nearly died. During World War II Max, who was in a reserved occupation joined the Royal Air Force Volunteer Reserve (RAFVR) and on 22 May 1944 was posted ‘missing in action’, although his death in Denmark was not confirmed until 1946. Shortly after being posted missing Dowding wrote to the retired Air Chief Marshal, Hugh Dowding of RAF Fighter Command during the Battle of Britain, desperate for any details of her husband, either by official means or more ‘spiritual’ channels, having learnt of his interest in life after death in his retirement. He invited her to meet him and they later married on 25 September 1951, at Caxton Hall, London. It was their shared interest in spiritualism which informed their concern for the ethical treatment of animals.

== Animal welfare ==
=== Early work and the NAVS ===
Dowding used her prominent social position to advance animal welfare. She hosted regular Sunday lunch parties introducing influential people to vegetarian food, and her house was a sanctuary for animals in need. She drew her husband’s attention to the abuse of the law on cruelty to animals and asked if he could do something about getting animals humanely slaughtered, encouraging him, as a member of the House of Lords to influence the legislation. His moving speeches in the House of Lords in support of the Humane Slaughter Bill concluded in legislation that eased animal suffering. It was the legislation of the Protection of Animals (Anaesthetics) Act, 1964 in which Lord and Lady Dowding took great pride, which had made it a criminal offence to castrate or otherwise cut into the living flesh of an animal without the use of anaesthesia.

Dowding became a committee member of the Animal Defence and Anti-Vivisection Society, after meeting its founder Lind-af-Hageby and in 1957, was elected to the council of the National Anti-Vivisection Society, later becoming their long-time president, following her husband Lord Dowding’s death in 1970. In this post she led demonstrations, petitioned parliament and helped raise the anti-vivisection cause, representing the organisation at conferences in the United Kingdom and abroad. In 1967. Dowding strove unsuccessfully to unify the two leading British anti-vivisection societies, the NAVS and the British Union for the Abolition of Vivisection (BUAV) of which BUAV had split away from in 1898. Brigid Brophy later wrote of her time with NAVS:

“She was not the only but the main engine that drove the NAVS about its patient work of identifying and harnessing zoo-philes among the people who possess actual political power and influence, and its patient and horrifying task of monitoring the atrocities of humans and their hypocrisies”.

=== Beauty Without Cruelty origins ===
The seeds of BWC were planted in 1946, while Dowding unpacked several brands of face creams bought years before when they were scarce. She noticed they were in varying degrees of decay, except one jar in perfect condition. A friend in the beauty industry informed her that this particular cream contained no animal ingredients. Then, in 1955, Dr Harry Lillie, surgeon to the Antarctic whaling fleet, informed her about the cruelty involved in furs and the trapping of fur-bearing animals and the annual slaughter of baby harp seals off Atlantic Canada, leaving a deep and lasting impression on her.

In 1959, appalled by the wearing of fur coats and accessories fashionable at the time, Dowding was compelled to bring the public’s attention to the barbaric cruelty inherent in the fur trade. Initially, she tried to persuade simulated fur coat manufacturers, who were chiefly the furriers making cheaper simulations, to advertise that these garments had caused no animal suffering. She thought attaching a label to this effect would highlight the cruelty involved in the making of real furs. Following numerous rejections, one firm finally agreed to cooperate and small labels bearing the slogan “Beauty Without Cruelty” were sewn into some coats. Several friends were drawn into the idea and together they formed a volunteer committee to help spread a cruelty-free concept through fashion shows featuring simulated furs. Their first show was a huge success and created much publicity, leading to subsequent events in London and other English cities. Dowding never intended to found a new society, but many people began writing to her, leading her husband to hire her at first one secretary, then another.

Dowding grew interested in the composition of soap after learning about the tragic reports of the mutilation of whales by explosive harpoons, which Dr Harry Lillie had witnessed, along with their use in the production of lubricants and cosmetics. (19) While researching soaps, she was put in touch with a man in the trade who highlighted a closely guarded secret of the cosmetic industry, about the way in which cosmetics and their ingredients were tested on animals. Shampoo was tested in rabbits’ eyes; dyes were rubbed onto the exposed nerves of the raw flesh of animals and the force feeding of lipsticks to an animal until its guts burst. Ingredients such as ambergris from whales was used in perfumes and its oil used in lipsticks and soaps. Musk, from the musk deer and civet musk from the civet were used as perfume fixatives. She tried to persuade leaders in the cosmetic industry to change their policies. When this failed, Dowding sought to find a constructive alternative.

In 1959, Dowding founded Beauty Without Cruelty which aimed to eliminate the use of animal ingredients in cosmetics, abolish animal testing in the cosmetics industry and discourage the wearing of furs. The fundamental purpose was to demonstrate that alternatives to clothing and cosmetics free from all animal cruelty were easily obtainable. In 1963, she founded Beauty Without Cruelty Cosmetics (BWC Ltd) with the help of Kathleen Long so that their full range of cruelty-free products could be sold. It produced its own cruelty-free cosmetics and marketed its own line of simulated furs and leathers. Dowding remained director of BWC Ltd until shortly before the educational charitable trust and the cosmetics company became separate organisations in 1980 and remained president of BWC until her resignation in 1981.

=== Other animal welfare causes ===
In 1969, Dowding cofounded IAAPEA, remaining a patron until her death. In 1972, with IAAPEA representatives she travelled to Poland, Finland and Russia to persuade their governments to set up institutes to investigate alternatives to research experiments on animals. In 1977, prior to the opening of the Third National Conference on Animal Welfare in New Delhi, India, Rukmini Devi Arundale arranged a meeting between the then Indian Prime Minister, Sri Morarji Desai and Dowding, where she helped secure the historic ban of exporting rhesus monkeys from India for experimentation. Mr Desai announced the ban at the conference the following day. In 1979, Dowding rallied in New York for a week of anti-fur protest coordinated by Dr. Ethel Thurston, head of BWC U.S.A. branch, to coincide with the American International Fur Fair. The effort is remembered as the beginning of the American anti-fur movement. In 1982, she resigned from the RSPCA along with the president Richard Adams and fellow vice president Lord Houghton of Sowerby.

Dowding was also a committee member of the Vegan Society and a Fellowship of Life patron. Following her husband’s death, she helped to administer The Lord Dowding Fund for Humane Research, which funds the development of alternatives for the use of animals in laboratory tests and watched over The Dowding Memorial Trust, a sanctuary for abandoned pets.

== Personal life ==
Dowding was a formidable opponent when defending animals, but little was known of her dread of public speaking, though spending two decades addressing audiences, finding herself at the forefront of an emerging animal rights movement. Dowding was often portrayed as a crank and mocked by the press, until gradually her ideas became more accepted and she began to be taken seriously. She also claimed to have got rid of rats and mice from her home by talking to them.

Supported by her second husband and family, Dowding’s sister, Kathleen Albino brought the Compassion quarterly journal into being, covering the activities of the movement and publishing articles on kindred subjects in the wider humanitarian field. Following Lord Dowding’s death in 1970, her son David Whiting gave up his career as an engineer to help his mother, travelling to many parts of the world, often risking his life, in order to bring back the hard facts and expose abuses to animals in trade, being dubbed ‘The Animal Spy’ by the press.

== Later life ==
Dowding was left almost penniless having given all her money away to charity. She received no pension from either her first husband, killed during WW2 or from her second husband, the man many people felt helped save the nation from Nazi invasion. She died in 1993 and her ashes were buried with her second husband in the RAF Chapel, Westminster Abbey.

== Legacy ==
Brigid Brophy writes: “Lady Dowding is the person who has provided practical alternatives to conniving atrocities. She has brought into being an organisation for providing alternative cosmetics and alternative clothes. She has brought into being a fund for financing non-atrocity experimentation, thereby providing an alternative to the huge quantities of private and state capital that exert such a pull towards the perpetuation of atrocities.”

Beauty Without Cruelty was Dowding’s vehicle, whose products, and cosmetics like them that proudly claim “Not tested on animals” and “No animal ingredients” are now available worldwide and sought by millions. What began as the philosophy of one small organisation eventually effected every cosmetic house worldwide and set a new standard for both consumers and manufacturers. In November 1998, the British Government announced that it would no longer license the testing of cosmetic products or their ingredients on animals and in the EU a ban took place in 2013.

== Publications ==
- Beauty Not the Beast. An autobiography by Muriel, The Lady Dowding. Neville Spearman. (1980). ISBN 9780859780568
- The Psychic Life of Muriel, the Lady Dowding: An Autobiography. Theosophical Publishing House (1980) [Foreword by Victor Goddard] ISBN 978-0835605649

== See also ==
- List of animal rights advocates
- List of vegetarians
