= Baron Dowding =

Title in the Peerage of the United Kingdom

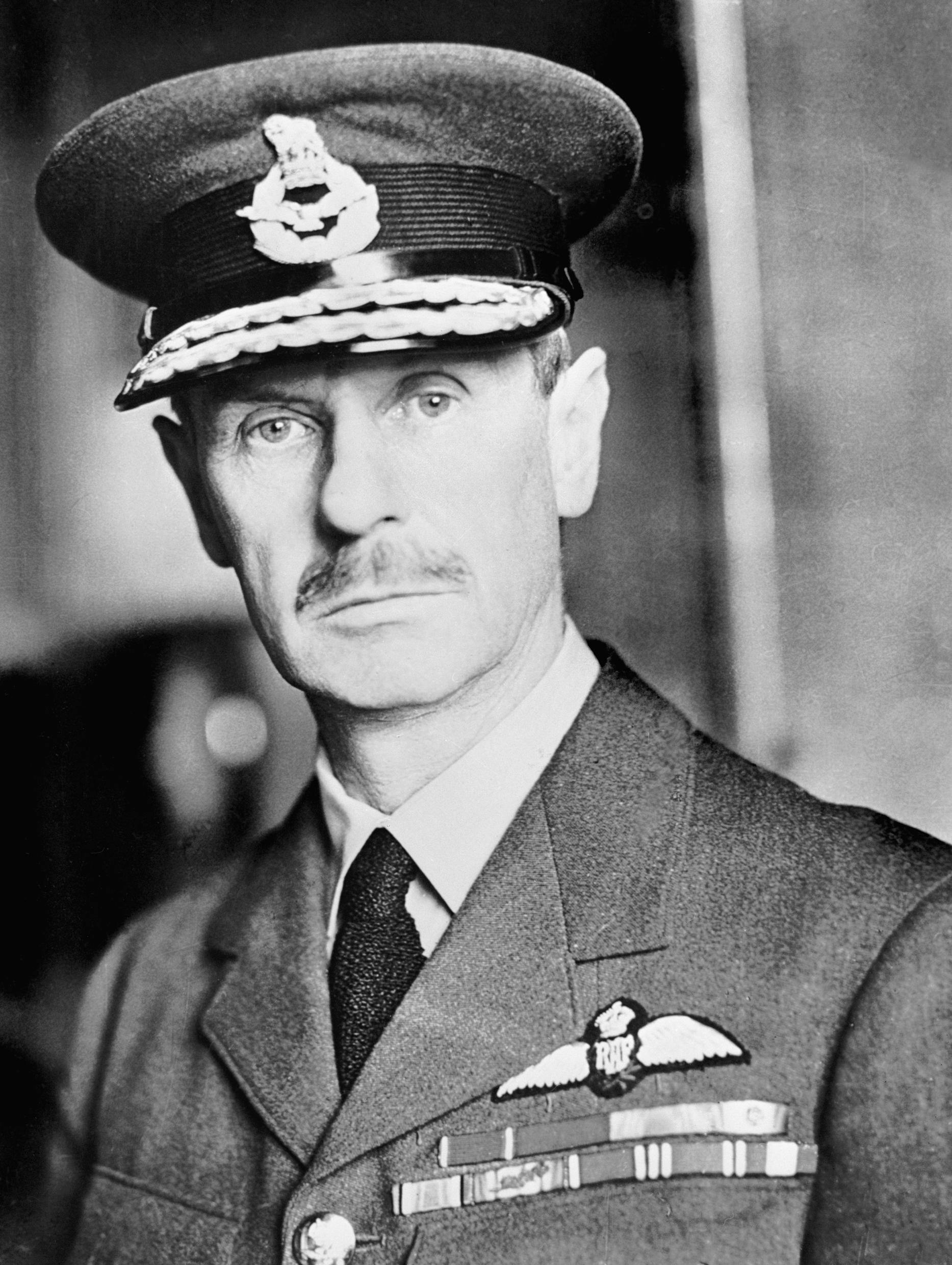
Hugh Dowding, 1st Baron Dowding

Baron Dowding, of Bentley Priory in the County of Middlesex, is a title in the Peerage of the United Kingdom. It was created on 5 July 1943 for the noted air commander Air Chief Marshal Sir Hugh Dowding. He was commander of the RAF Fighter Command during the Battle of Britain in 1940. As of 2010 the title is held by his grandson, the third Baron, who succeeded his father in 1992.

== Barons Dowding (1943) ==
- Hugh Caswall Tremenheere Dowding, 1st Baron Dowding (1882–1970)
- Derek Hugh Tremenheere Dowding, 2nd Baron Dowding (1919–1992)
- Piers Hugh Tremenheere Dowding, 3rd Baron Dowding (b. 1948)

The heir presumptive is the present holder's only brother the Honourable Mark Dennis James Dowding (b. 1949)

The heir presumptive's heir apparent is his only son Alexander Dowding (b. 1983)

Coat of arms of Baron Dowding
Crest Upon a catherine wheel Azure a falcon rising Or belled and hooded Gules. Escutcheon Argent three bars gemel Sable overall a fleur-de-lis Azure on a chief of the second three Doric columns of the first. Motto Laborare Est Orare
