= Hugh Dowding =

Royal Air Force Air Chief Marshal (1882–1970)

The Right Honourable The Lord Dowding GCB GCVO CMG
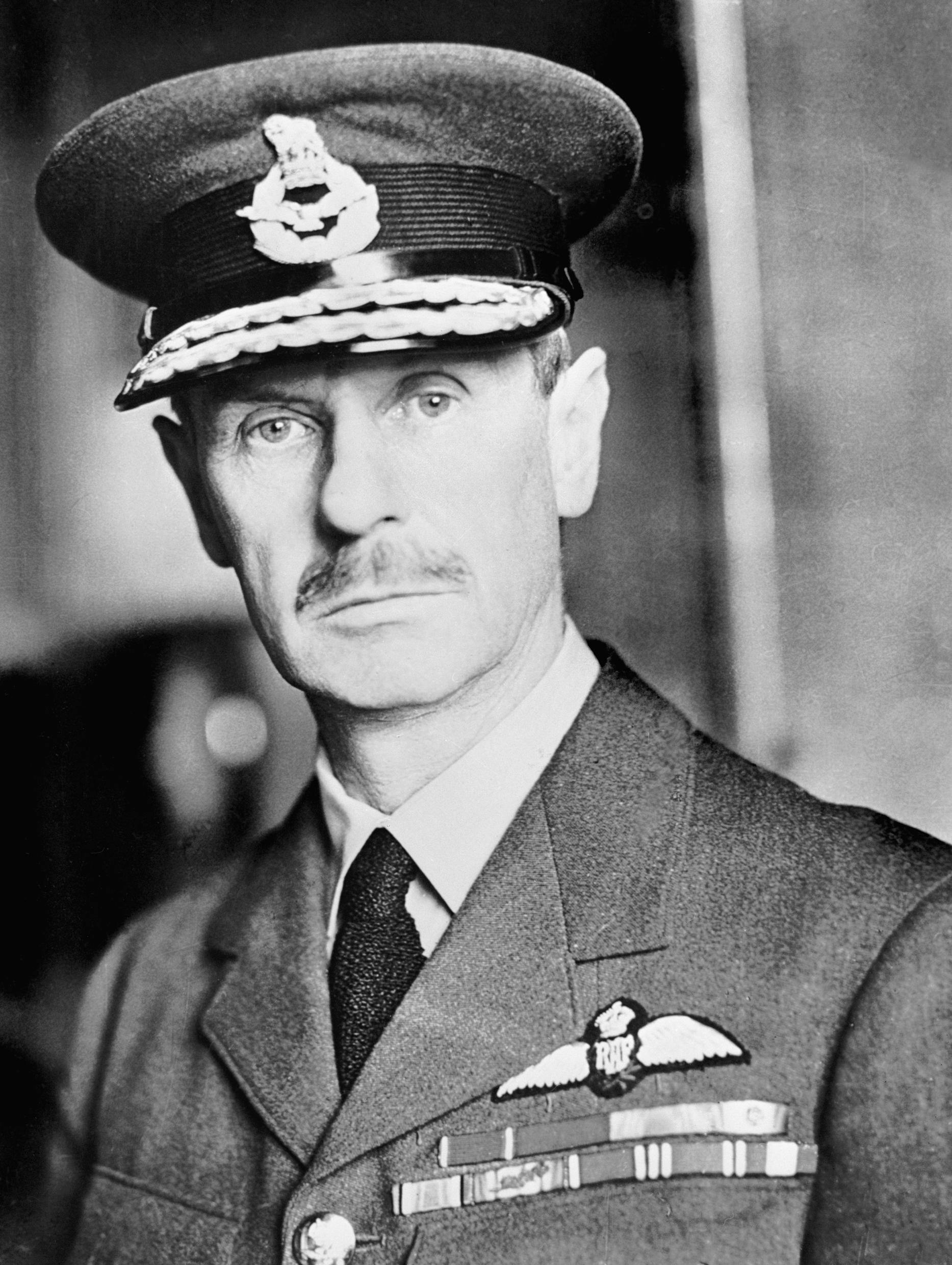
- Dowding in c. 1935
- Born: Hugh Caswall Tremenheere Dowding; 24 April 1882; Moffat, Scotland
- Died: 15 February 1970 (aged 87); Royal Tunbridge Wells, England
- Spouses: Clarice Maud Vancourt (m. 1918; died 1920) Muriel Whiting (m. 1951)
- Children: 1
- Military career
- Allegiance: United Kingdom
- Branch: British Army; Royal Air Force
- Service years: 1900–1942
- Rank: Air Chief Marshal
- Nickname: Stuffy
- Commands: RAF Fighter Command (1936–40); Air Member for Research and Development (1935–36); Air Member for Supply and Research (1930–35); Fighting Area, Air Defence of Great Britain (1929–30); RAF Transjordan and Palestine (1929); No. 1 Group (1920–22); No. 16 Group (1919–20); No. 16 Squadron (1915–16)
- Conflicts: First World War; Second World War: Battle of Britain
- Awards: Knight Grand Cross of the Order of the Bath; Knight Grand Cross of the Royal Victorian Order; Companion of the Order of St Michael and St George; Mentioned in Despatches

Air Chief Marshal Hugh Caswall Tremenheere Dowding, 1st Baron Dowding (24 April 1882 – 15 February 1970) was a senior officer in the Royal Air Force. He was Air Officer Commanding RAF Fighter Command during the Battle of Britain and is generally credited with playing a crucial role in Britain's defence, and hence, the defeat of Operation Sea Lion, Adolf Hitler's plan to invade Britain.

Born in Moffat, Scotland, Dowding was an officer in the British Army in the 1900s and early 1910s. He joined the Royal Flying Corps at the start of the First World War and went on to serve as a fighter pilot and then as commanding officer of No. 16 Squadron. During the inter-war years he became Air Officer Commanding Fighting Area, Air Defence of Great Britain and then joined the Air Council as Air Member for Supply and Research. In July 1936, Dowding was appointed chief of the newly created RAF Fighter Command.

During the Battle of Britain in the Second World War, Dowding's Fighter Command successfully defended the UK against the attacks of the Luftwaffe, thanks to his prudent management of RAF resources and detailed preparation of Britain's air defences (the Dowding system). He subsequently came into conflict with proponents of the Big Wing tactic, most notably Trafford Leigh-Mallory and Douglas Bader, which along with the inadequacies of RAF's night-time defence during the Blitz led to his eventual downfall. In November 1940, Dowding was replaced in command against his wishes by Sholto Douglas, another Big Wing advocate.

After further appointments in the US and then back to the UK, Dowding retired from the Royal Air Force in July 1942, He was made a peer in June 1943. Dowding subsequently became an influential member of the British spiritualist, theosophical, and animal rights movements.

== Early life ==
Dowding was born in Moffat, Dumfriesshire, the son of Arthur John Caswall Dowding and Maud Caroline Dowding (née Tremenheere). His father had taught at Fettes College in Edinburgh before moving to Moffat. Dowding was educated at St Ninian's School and Winchester College. He trained at the Royal Military Academy, Woolwich before being commissioned as a second lieutenant in the Royal Garrison Artillery on 18 August 1900.

== Military career ==
Promoted to lieutenant on 8 May 1902, Dowding served with the Royal Garrison Artillery at Gibraltar, in Ceylon and in Hong Kong before being posted to No. 7 Mountain Artillery Battery in India in 1904. In September 1907 he was seconded for service with the Native Mountain Artillery in India. After returning to the United Kingdom, he attended the Army Staff College 1912 before being promoted to captain on 18 August 1913 and being posted with the Royal Garrison Artillery on the Isle of Wight later that year. After becoming interested in aviation, Dowding gained Aviator's Certificate no. 711 on 19 December 1913 in a Vickers biplane at the Vickers School of Flying, Brooklands. He then attended the Central Flying School, where he was awarded his wings. Although added to the Reserve List of the Royal Flying Corps (RFC), Dowding returned to the Isle of Wight to resume his Royal Garrison Artillery duties. However, this arrangement was short lived and in August 1914, he joined the RFC as a pilot on No. 7 Squadron.

=== First World War ===
Dowding transferred to No. 6 Squadron in October 1914 and then, after two weeks as a staff officer in France, became a Flight Commander, first with No. 9 Squadron and then with No. 6 Squadron. He served from December 1914 as a general staff officer, grade 3 and was seconded. He became commanding officer of the Wireless Experimental Establishment at Brooklands in March 1915 and went on to be commanding officer of No. 16 Squadron in July 1915, which was based at La Gorgue in northern France. After the Battle of the Somme, Dowding clashed with General Hugh Trenchard, the commander of the RFC, over the need to give pilots some rest and recuperation. In September 1915 Duncan Grinnell-Milne joined No 16 squadron as a junior pilot. Years later he published an account of his time in the squadron, in which he criticises Dowding as being "too reserved and aloof from his juniors", although efficient. Promoted to major on 30 December 1915, Dowding was recalled to England in January 1916, and, having been promoted to temporary lieutenant colonel on 1 February 1916 was given command of 7 Wing at Farnborough later that month. He transferred to the command of 9 Wing at Fienvillers in June 1916. Returning to England, he was promoted to temporary colonel on 1 January 1917 on appointment as commander of the Southern Group Command and promoted to temporary brigadier-general on 23 June 1917 before being given command of the southern training brigade in August 1917. He was sent to York as chief staff officer to the RAF's senior administrative officer in the area in April 1918. He was appointed a Companion of the Order of St Michael and St George on 1 January 1919.

=== Inter-war years ===
Dowding was given a permanent commission in the RAF on 1 August 1919 with the rank of group captain. He commanded No. 16 Group from October 1919 and then No. 1 Group from February 1920 where he was responsible for organising two of the annual air displays at Hendon. He was promoted to air commodore on 1 January 1922, and served as chief staff officer at Inland Area headquarters at Uxbridge from February 1922 before being appointed Chief Staff Officer for RAF Iraq Command in August 1924.

Dowding was an accomplished skier, winner of the first ever National Slalom Championship, and president of the Ski Club of Great Britain from 1924 to 1925. The dominant personality within the RAF in the 1920s was Hugh Trenchard who ardently believed in strategic bombing as a war-winning measure and as a result, the interwar RAF was dominated by a "bomber cult" as Trenchard tended to promote officers who shared his views about strategic bombing. Dowding stood out as one of the few RAF officers not totally enamoured with bombers and who was more interested in fighters.

In May 1926 Dowding was appointed director of training at the Air Ministry. He was appointed a Companion of the Order of the Bath on 2 January 1928 and promoted to air vice-marshal on 1 January 1929. Trenchard sent him to Palestine and Transjordan to study security problems caused by Arab–Jewish unrest: his reports, which gained Trenchard's approval, were a cause of further career advancement. Dowding became Air Officer Commanding Fighting Area, Air Defence of Great Britain in December 1929 and then joined the Air Council as Air Member for Supply and Research in September 1930. One of his first responsibilities in this post was the approval of the granting of a certificate of airworthiness to the R101 airship shortly before it set off on its ill-fated voyage to India; he later said "I think I was wrong not to insist on much more extensive trials and tests" and that his decision had been based on optimistic technical advice. Dowding's time in this office coincided with a period of rapid development in aircraft design and a growing fear that another major war was on the horizon. Although without scientific or technical training, he displayed a great capacity for understanding technical matters. He was promoted to air marshal on 1 January 1933 and advanced to Knight Commander of the Order of the Bath on 3 June 1933.

In July 1936 Dowding was appointed commanding officer of the newly created RAF Fighter Command, and was perhaps the one important person in Britain, and perhaps the world, who did not agree with British Prime Minister Stanley Baldwin's 1932 declaration that "The bomber will always get through". He conceived and oversaw the development of the "Dowding system". This consisted of an integrated air defence system which included (i) radar (whose potential Dowding was among the first to appreciate), (ii) human observers (including the Royal Observer Corps), who filled crucial gaps in what radar was capable of detecting at the time (the early radar systems, for example, did not provide accurate information on the altitude of incoming German aircraft), (iii) raid plotting, and (iv) radio control of aircraft. The whole network was linked in many cases by dedicated telephone cables buried sufficiently deeply to provide protection against bombing. The network had its centre at RAF Bentley Priory, a converted country house on the outskirts of London. The system as a whole later became known as Ground-controlled interception (GCI).

A major problem for the RAF was the way that the Canadian prime minister William Lyon Mackenzie King from 1935 onward repeatedly vetoed plans for the Empire Air Training Scheme for training pilots from all the Commonwealth nations in Canada, which prevented Fighter Command from building up a reserve of properly trained pilots. By the time the British Commonwealth Air Training Plan was finally launched in the autumn of 1939 after Mackenzie King gave his consent, it was far too late for Dowding. On an average, it took about one year to train a pilot plus another year of squadron flying to prepare a pilot for war. In lieu of the Empire Air Training Scheme that he wanted, Dowding was forced to depend upon the Auxiliary Air Force, the RAF Volunteer Reserve and the University Air Squadrons to provide him with a reserve of trained pilots. However, despite all the efforts to give Fighter Command a reserve of pilots, Dowding complained in 1939 that he lacked sufficient reserves of properly trained pilots to face the Luftwaffe. On the basis of the First World War experiences, Dowding predicted that many of his pilots would be rapidly killed or seriously injured in the event of war, all the more because the Luftwaffe had many combat-experienced pilots who had served in the Spanish Civil War, and it still took a year to train a pilot, leading him to warn that he would almost certainly face a shortage of pilots.

Dowding also brought modern aircraft into service during the pre-war period, including the eight gun Spitfire and Hurricane. He is also credited with having fought the Air Ministry so that fighters were equipped with bullet-proof wind shields. At a meeting with the Air Ministry when told that bullet-proof windows were too expensive, Dowding replied: "If Chicago gangsters can have bulletproof glass in their cars I can't see any reason why my pilots cannot have the same". Dowding was a quiet, reserved man, but was greatly admired by those who served under him. He was promoted to air chief marshal on 1 January 1937 and appointed a Knight Grand Cross of the Royal Victorian Order on 23 January 1937.

=== Second World War ===
==== Battle of Britain ====
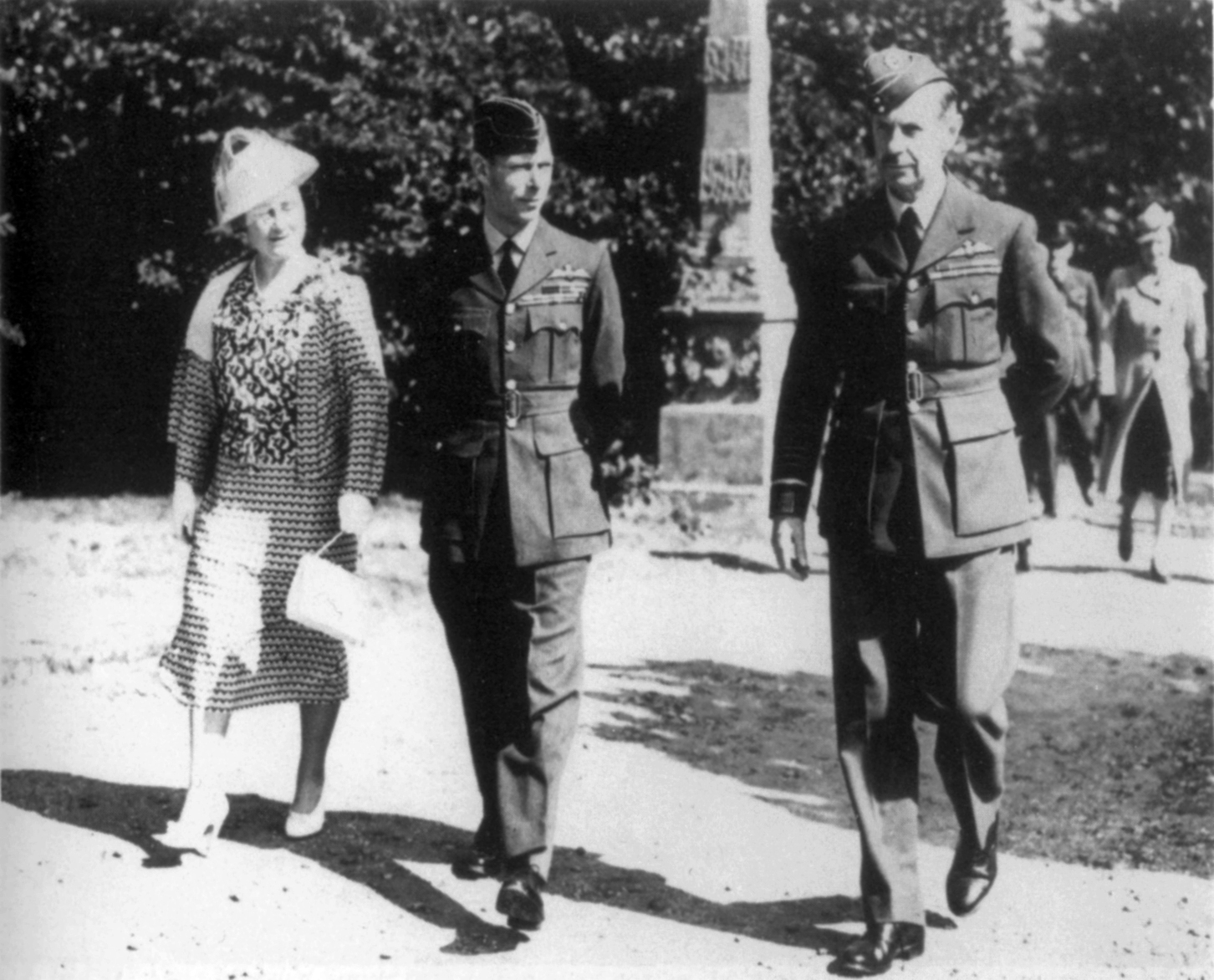
Queen Elizabeth and King George VI with Dowding in 1940

At the time of his retirement in June 1939, Dowding was asked to stay on until March 1940 because of the tense international situation. He was again permitted to continue serving through the Battle of Britain, first until July and finally until November 1940. In 1940, Dowding, nicknamed "Stuffy" by his men for his alleged lack of humour, proved unwilling to sacrifice aircraft and pilots in the attempt to aid Allied troops during the Battle of France. He, along with his immediate superior Sir Cyril Newall, then Chief of the Air Staff, resisted repeated requests from Winston Churchill to weaken the home defence by sending precious squadrons to France.

Dowding lacked tact when it came to dealing with politicians, and right from the onset he did not get along well with Churchill. The British historian Len Deighton wrote: "But Dowding was no paragon. Too often he resorted to caustic comments when a kind word of advice would have produced the same or better results...Dowding was indifferent to the boardroom politics of higher office, impatient and abrasive to men who failed to understand his reasoning". Just before a cabinet meeting on 15 May 1940, Dowding protested before an informal committee that consisted of Churchill; the minister of aircraft production, Lord Beaverbrook and the Air Minister Sir Archibald Sinclair that the number of fighter squadrons available to Fighter Command had been reduced from 52 to 36, and at present rate of losses in France, he would have no squadrons available within two weeks. Dowding attended the subsequent cabinet meeting, but did not speak. The meeting ended with the cabinet voting to send four more squadrons to France. On 16 May 1940, Churchill held a summit In Paris with the French Premier Paul Reynaud, and telephoned London afterwards to ask for six more fighter squadrons to be sent to France. At a cabinet meeting late in the afternoon of the same day, Sinclair mentioned Dowding's argument, which led to the cabinet to agree that the additional six squadrons could operate from French airfields in the day, but had to return to the United Kingdom at night. Churchill was angered by the way that Dowding's arguments had swayed the cabinet into a decision that he did not want and came to feel a grudge against Dowding. In a clear sign of disfavour, Churchill barely mentioned Dowding in Their Finest Hour, volume 2 of his memoirs/history of the Second World, and in the few times that he did, he gave distorted accounts that cast Dowding in a dark light. In Their Finest Hour, Churchill wrote: "Air Chief Marshal Dowding, at the head of the metropolitan Fighter Command, had declared to me that with twenty-five squadrons of fighters he could defend the island against the whole of the German Air Force, but that with less he would be overpowered". Deighton wrote that this statement was "nonsense" as Dowding in a letter to Churchill dated 15 May 1940 had expressed grave concerns about the ability of Fighter Command to hold out against the Luftwaffe with only thirty-six squadrons. When the Allied resistance in France collapsed, he worked closely with Air Vice-Marshal Keith Park, the commander of 11 Fighter Group, in organising cover for the evacuation of the British Expeditionary Force at Dunkirk.

Through the summer and autumn of 1940 in the Battle of Britain, Dowding's Fighter Command resisted the attacks of the Luftwaffe. Beyond the critical importance of the overall system of integrated air defence which he had developed for Fighter Command, his major contribution was to marshal resources behind the scenes (including replacement aircraft and air crew) and to maintain a significant fighter reserve, while leaving his subordinate commanders' hands largely free to run the battle in detail. The first phase of the Battle of Britain, namely Luftwaffe attacks on British shipping in the English Channel were what Deighton called a classic "heads I win, tails you lose" gambit. If Dowding committed his fighters at the near-range of German aircraft, he risked having the strength of Fighter Command reduced via attrition while he did not think the Luftwaffe would sink the merchantmen. Because of a shortage of pilots, Dowding only committed the minimal number of fighters during what the Germans called the Kanalkampf (Channel battle), which led to increased shipping losses in July–August 1940. He was forced to commit more fighter squadrons close to the coast even though he knew it was highly dangerous. The Luftwaffe planes were already flying at the optimal height over the Channel while it took time for the British fighters taking off at coastal airfields to reach the proper flying height, which thereby gave the Luftwaffe the advantage in any dogfights over the Channel. An additional concern for Dowding was that the planes of Fighter Command had no dinghies or sea dye while Britain at this point lacked an air-sea rescue organisation, so that any pilot shot down over the Channel were more likely than not to be lost. As more colliers were sunk in the Channel while Fighter Command losses increased, Dowding stoutly resisted pressure to send more fighters in the Kanalkampf and instead urged that more trains be used to move coal from Wales to London. By end of July 1940, Fighter Command had lost 145 aircraft in the Kanalkampf. Dowding had an influential patron in the form of Lord Beaverbrook, who became fond of him, all the more so because the civil servants of the Air Ministry disliked Dowding. On a more personal note, Beaverbrook's son, Maxwell Aitken, was serving in Fighter Command and Beaverbrook decided that Dowding with his concern for the lives of his pilots was the best man to keep his son alive.

British aircraft production continued at a brisk rate and it was the loss of pilots that was most concerning to Dowding. It took nearly a year to train a pilot to properly fly an aircraft, and the losses of pilots in the Battle of Britain imposed immense strain on Fighter Command, all the more so because the remaining pilots were forced to fly more to replace those killed or wounded. The majority of the 3,000 pilots under Dowding's command, namely 80% were British, but the fighter squadrons sent from the Commonwealth along with squadrons of emigres from Poland, Czechoslovakia, France, and Belgium were greatly appreciated to help ease the strain imposed by Fighter Command's losses. In early August 1940, Dowding learned via Ultra intelligence that the Luftwaffe was preparing for Adlertag (Eagle Day) set for 13 August 1940, which was intended to be a series of aerial attacks to win command of the sky. Eagle Day failed to achieve its stated goals as Fighter Command lost 34 planes in aerial combat while another 16 destroyed on the ground while shooting down 75 German planes. Eagle Day came to be known in the Luftwaffe as "der schwarze Donnerstag"" ("the black Thursday") owing to the heavy losses taken. During the fighting on Eagle Day, Dowding observed that the Luftwaffe bombers were no match for the Spitfires and Hurricanes, and that German bombers could only operate in the day with the escort of Bf 109 fighters. As the Bf 109 fighters could only fly over south-eastern England owing to their fuel ranges, it was possible to move RAF fighters to airfields out of range for the Bf 109s, which provided a respite of sorts for Fighter Command. Dowding noted that the grim irony that the more successful Fighter Command was at shooting down Luftwaffe bombers during the day, the more likely it was that the Luftwaffe would switch over to bombing by night, a course that Fighter Command was not prepared for. It was also during Eagle Day that Trafford Leigh-Mallory, the GOC of 12 Group, started to become increasing vocal in expressing criticism of Park for not adopting his favoured "big wing" tactics of forming up a large wing of fighters as Park much preferred to send in fighters in looser, informal small groups. Leigh-Mallory also started to attack Dowding for not imposing the "big wing" tactics upon all of Fighter Command. The requirement that not all of Fighter Command's planes be on the ground being fuelled and armed led Dowding to commit small groups to attack the Luftwaffe bombers and their fighter escorts in waves. It was during the summer of 1940 that Dowding first learned of the Knickebein (literally "dog-leg") radio beam system, which guided Luftwaffe bombers to their targets during the night. The British called the Knickebein radio guidance system "headache" and called their electronic jamming countermeasures "aspirins". Owing to the threat posed by bombers guided by the Knickebein radio beams, Dowding ordered that electronic jamming of the radio beams be made a priority.

By late August 1940, Dowding was seriously concerned about Fighter Command's losses along with a decline in pilot quality as the RAF was forced to transfer pilots from Bomber Command and Coastal Command to Fighter Command and training was degraded to allow more pilots to graduate on a shortened training course. The great advantage for Fighter Command in August 1940 was that Dowding rotated his fighter squadrons to give his pilots a rest while the opposing German commanders, Albert Kesselring and Hugo Sperrle, did not. On 1 September 1940, Dowding realised that the losses taken during the fighting in July–August 1940 was such that there were no more squadrons to rotate into the area of 11 Group of Fighter Command, which always endured the most heavy fighting. That day, Dowding took what he called "a desperate expedient" of breaking the squadrons into A, B and C types. The A type squadrons stationed in 11 Group were to continue to defend south-eastern England; the B type squadrons in 10 and 12 Groups were to relieve the A squadrons and the C type squadrons stationed elsewhere were to serve as training units, feeding new pilots into the A squadrons as needed. On 3 September 1940, Dowding reported to Churchill that 25% of all Fighter Command's pilots had been lost since the beginning of the Battle of Britain on top of the losses taken in France in the spring, and at current rate of losses Fighter Command would not be able to last much longer. Dowding also noted that about a quarter of his pilots were new pilots who had just graduated from the Operational Training Units who had less than two weeks' flying experience. Hermann Göring took personal charge of the Luftwaffe forces attacking Britain and on 7 September 1940 dispatched a huge force of 1,000 bombers to strike London. That day, Dowding was having a meeting with Park, when he learned via reports from radar operators of the bomber force heading towards London. During the fighting on 7 September, the "Big Wing" tactics favoured by Trafford Leigh-Mallory of 12 Group failed as it took too long to form up the "big wing" while Park's tactics proved superior as 11 Group actually met the Luftwaffe. On 9 September 1940, Göring dispatched another huge bombing raid on London, which met with fierce resistance from 11 Group. Deighton wrote: "Park's handling of the fighting of 9 September was as brilliant as any in the war. Virtually none of the German bombers achieved hits on its primary target".

Dowding received advance notice via Ultra intelligence of another large German raid scheduled for 15 September 1940. Park planned to attack the Luftwaffe both on its way to London and back, which forced his ground crews to work in record time to refuel and rearm his fighters as they landed after attacking the bombers on their way to London. The aerial battles on 15 September 1940 saw about 300 RAF fighters take on 400 Luftwaffe fighters. The Luftwaffe lost about 50 aircraft which convinced its commanders that Fighter Command possessed deeper reserves of pilots than what the RAF actually possessed. Churchill's speech on the radio that evening claimed: "Aided by Czech and Polish squadrons and using only a small proportion of their total strength, the Royal Air Force cut to rags and tatters separate waves of murderous assault upon the civil population of their native land". Fighter Command did not win command of the sky as the Luftwaffe continued to bomb Britain long after the battle of 15 September 1940, but the mere fact that Fighter Command had prevented the Luftwaffe from gaining command of the sky was sufficient to win the Battle of Britain. In an operational sense, Dowding had fought the Luftwaffe to a draw, but in strategical sense the battle was a British victory as the German invasion of Britain was strictly postulated on winning command of the sky first. On 17 September 1940, Hitler postponed Operation Sealion, the codename for the invasion of Britain, until "further notice".

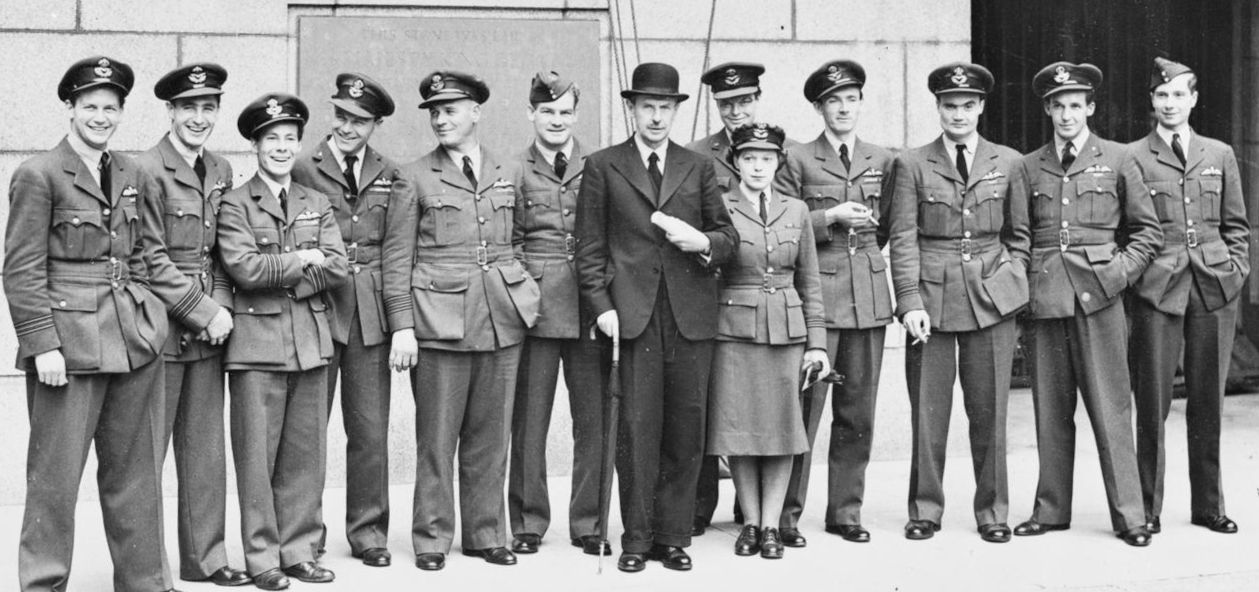
Dowding (in the Bowler hat) with some of The Few

Dowding was known for his humility and great sincerity. Fighter Command pilots came to characterise Dowding as one who cared for his men and had their best interests at heart. Dowding often referred to his "dear fighter boys" as his "chicks": indeed his son Derek was one of them. Because of his brilliant detailed preparation of Britain's air defences for the German assault, and his prudent management of his resources during the battle, Dowding is today generally given the credit for Britain's victory in the Battle of Britain.

Dowding's subsequent downfall has been attributed by some to his single-mindedness and perceived lack of diplomacy and political savoir faire in dealing with intra-RAF challenges and intrigues, most obviously the still, even now, hotly debated Big Wing controversy in which a number of senior and active service officers had argued in favour of large set-piece air battles with the Luftwaffe as an alternative to Dowding's successful Fabian strategy. Another reason often cited for his removal, but characterised by some contemporary commentators more as a pretext, was the difficulty of countering German nighttime bombing raids on British cities.

The account of radar pioneer, E. G. Bowen in Radar Days (1987) rebuts the claim that Dowding's grasp of the problems of British night fighters was inadequate. He suggests that if Dowding had been left to follow his own path, the ultimately effective British response to night bombing (which depended completely on developments in air-borne radar) would have come somewhat sooner.

Dowding himself showed that he had a good grasp of night fighter defence and was planning a defence system against night bombing in a letter he wrote some time after the Battle of Britain. However, there was great political and public pressure during the Blitz for something to be done, and Fighter Command's existing resources without, as yet, airborne radar, proved woefully inadequate. A committee of enquiry chaired by Sir John Salmond produced a long list of recommendations to improve night air defence; when Dowding approved only some of them, his erstwhile supporters, Lord Beaverbrook and Churchill, decided that it was time for him to step down.

On 8 October 1940, Dowding was advanced to Knight Grand Cross of the Order of the Bath. Before the war, the leadership of the RAF was committed to winning the next war via strategical bombing, and it was an article of faith amongst the senior Air Marshals that it would be impossible for fighter aircraft to stop a bombing offensive. Deighton wrote that the RAF leadership "acted more vindictively" against Dowding and Park for winning the Battle of Britain than Hermann Göring did with the defeated Luftwaffe generals largely because Dowding and Park had proven the Air Ministry wrong by defeating a strategical bombing offensive. Dowding and Park were summoned to meet what Beaverbrook called a gang of "bloody Air Marshals" who in a quasi-trial accused Dowding and Park of failure in the Battle of Britain. Both Trafford Leigh-Mallory and the fighter ace Douglas Bader argued at the meeting that the Big Wing tactics were superior to those practiced by Dowding and Park, who were effectively treated as if they had lost the Battle of Britain.

Dowding unwillingly relinquished command on 24 November 1940 and was replaced by Big Wing advocate Sholto Douglas. Churchill tried to soften the blow by putting him in charge of the British Air Mission to the United States, responsible for the procurement of new aircraft types.

Publication of his book Twelve Legions of Angels was suppressed in November 1941. The British Government considered that it contained information which might be of use to the Germans. The book was finally published in 1946, soon after the war ended.

==== Ministry of Aircraft Production ====
After leaving Fighter Command, Dowding was sent on special duty to the United States for the Ministry of Aircraft Production, but there he made himself unpopular with his outspokenness. On his return he headed a study into economies of RAF manpower before retiring from the Royal Air Force in July 1942. He was elevated to the peerage, as Baron Dowding of Bentley Priory on 2 June 1943.

== Later life ==
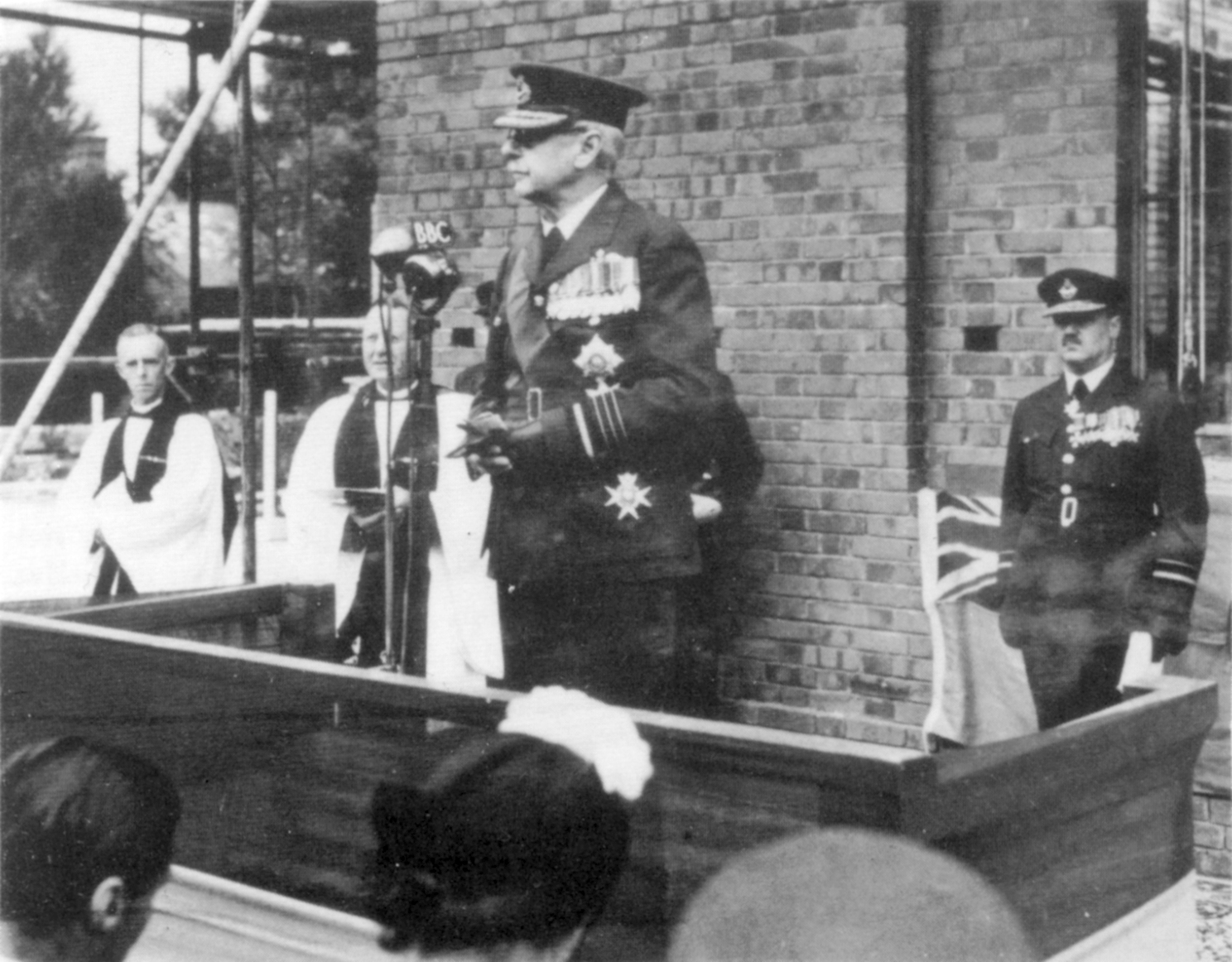
Lord Dowding laying the foundation stone of the RAF chapel, now known as St. George's Chapel of Remembrance, at RAF Biggin Hill in 1951

Later in life, because of his belief that he was unjustly treated by the RAF, Dowding became increasingly bitter. The RAF passed him over for promotion to Marshal of the Royal Air Force.

He approved Robert Wright's book Dowding and the Battle of Britain, which argued that a conspiracy of Big Wing proponents, including Trafford Leigh-Mallory and Douglas Bader, had engineered his sacking from Fighter Command.

In 1951, Dowding laid the foundation stone of the Chapel of St George at RAF Biggin Hill, now London Biggin Hill Airport, in memory of fallen airmen.

In 1967, Dowding served as technical advisor in the film production of Battle of Britain, a Harry Saltzman production, his character played by Laurence Olivier.

Dowding and his second wife Baroness Dowding were both anti-vivisectionists, and in 1973 Britain's National Anti-Vivisection Society founded the Lord Dowding Fund for Humane Research in his honour.

=== Spiritualism ===
In his retirement, Dowding became actively interested in spiritualism, both as a writer and speaker. His first book on the subject, Many Mansions, was written in 1943, followed by Lychgate (1945), The Dark Star and God's Magic. Rejecting conventional Christianity, he joined the Theosophical Society which advocated belief in reincarnation. He wrote of meeting dead "RAF boys" in his sleep – spirits who flew fighters from mountain-top runways made of light. Dowding became a vegetarian, based on his beliefs as a theosophist and spiritualist. Although he was a vegetarian, he believed that "animals will be killed to satisfy human needs for many a long day to come", and he made several appeals in the House of Lords for the humane killing of animals intended for food. He was also a member of the Fairy Investigation Society. Although he knew that people considered him a crank for his belief in fairies, Dowding believed that fairies "are essential to the growth of plants and the welfare of the vegetable kingdom".

== Death ==
Dowding died at his home in Royal Tunbridge Wells, Kent, on 15 February 1970. His body was cremated and his ashes were placed below the Battle of Britain Memorial Window in the Royal Air Force chapel in Westminster Abbey. Dowding's son Derek (1919–1992) inherited the title of Baron Dowding.

== Personal life ==
Dowding married Clarice Maud Vancourt, the daughter of an officer in the Indian Army, on 16 February 1918. She had one child from a previous marriage, Marjorie Brenda Williams (1911–2003) and they had one child together, Derek Hugh Tremenheere (1919–1992). Clarice died in 1920, and Dowding's sister Hilda helped Dowding look after the two children.

Dowding married Muriel Whiting (née Albino) on 25 September 1951; they had no children.

== Legacy ==
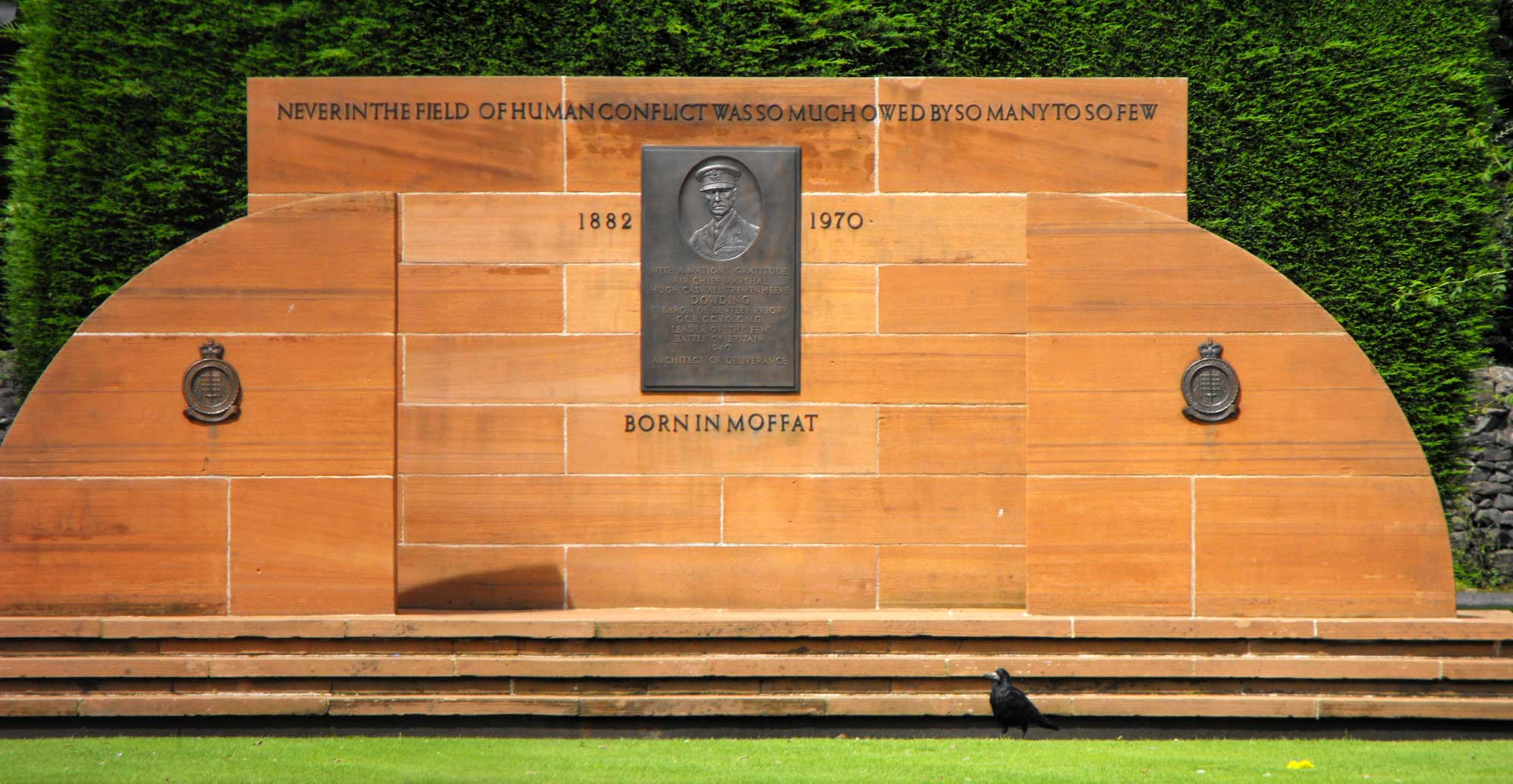
Memorial in Moffat

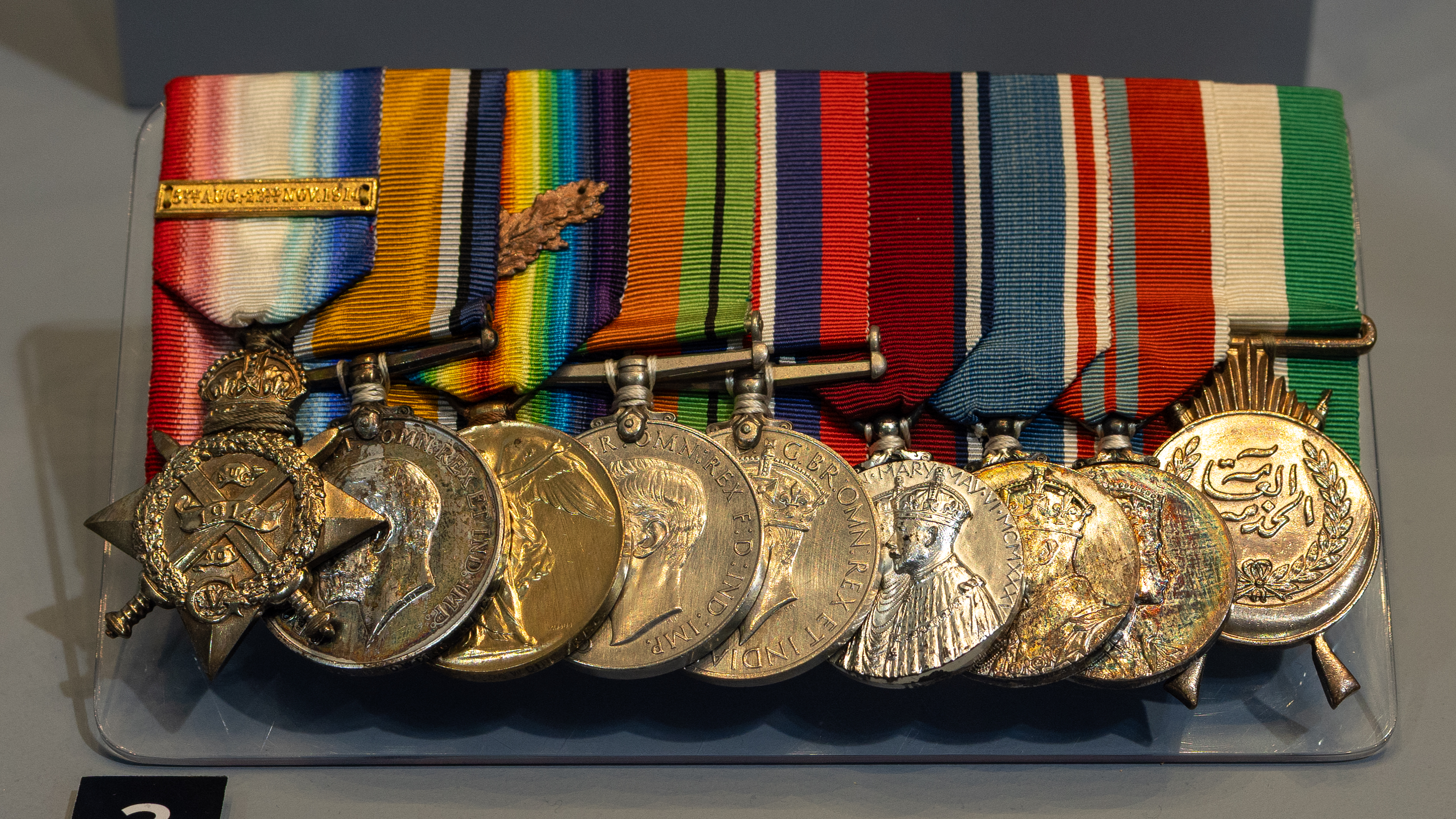
Dowding's medals at Royal Air Force Museum London

In the 1940s and 1950s, H.D. wrote several novels, memoirs, and book-length poems about Dowding.

=== Portrayals ===
Dowding has been portrayed by:

- Charles Carson (1956) Reach for the Sky
- Laurence Olivier (1969) Battle of Britain; Olivier had himself served as a pilot in the Royal Navy's Fleet Air Arm during the Second World War. During filming in summer 1968, 86 years old and unable to walk due to severe arthritis, Dowding visited the set at Hawkinge airfield in Kent. Olivier told Dowding he had sat behind the latter's desk all day "pretending to be you" and was "making an awful mess of it too", to which Dowding replied, "Oh, I'm sure you are." The crew and Olivier broke into laughter. Footage of this can be seen in the special features section of the film's Special Edition DVD.
- Adrian Rawlins (2017) Darkest Hour
- Nicholas Farrell (2018) Hurricane: 303 Squadron

== Honours and tributes ==
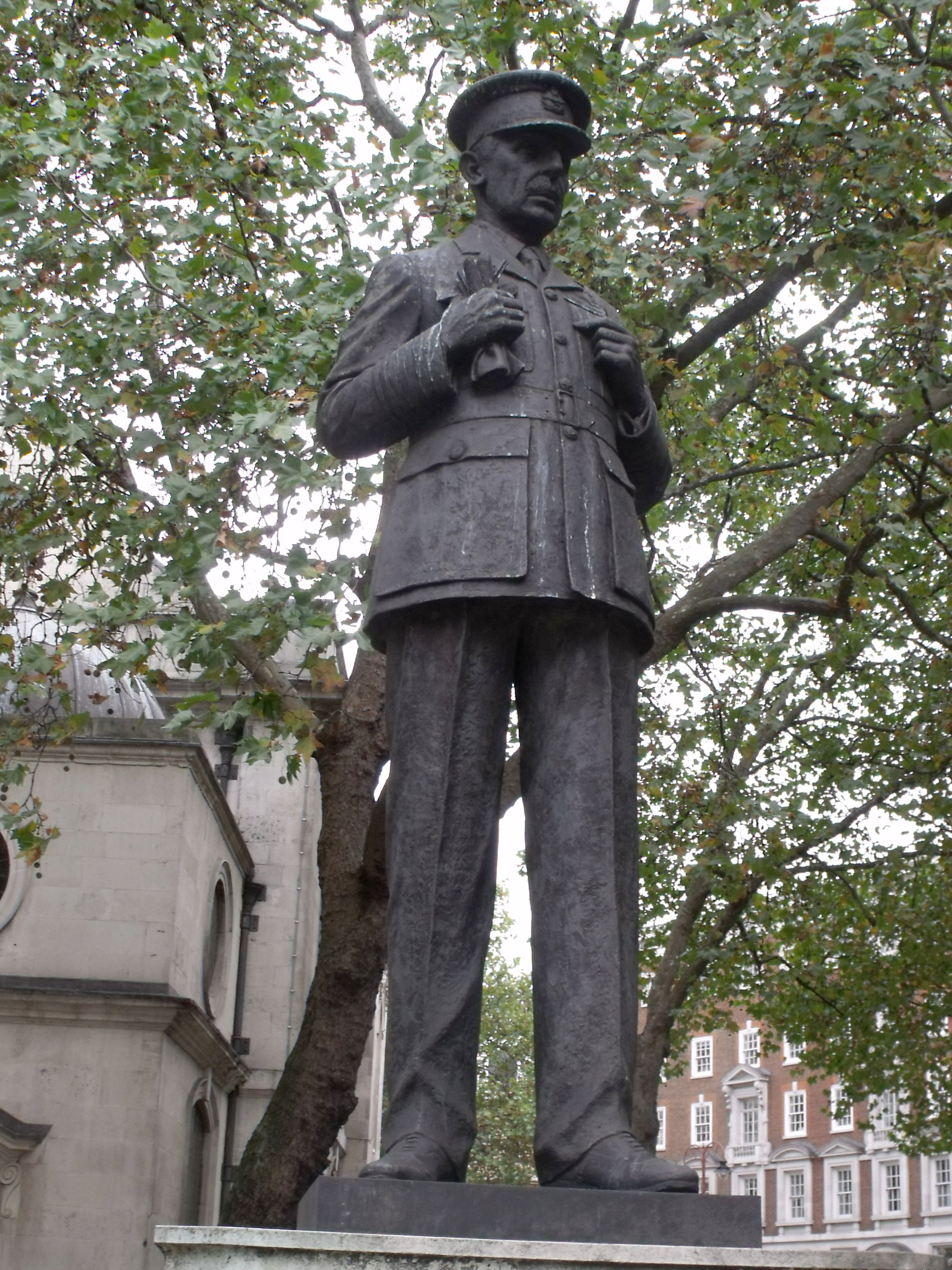
Lord Dowding statue, St Clement Danes, the Strand, London

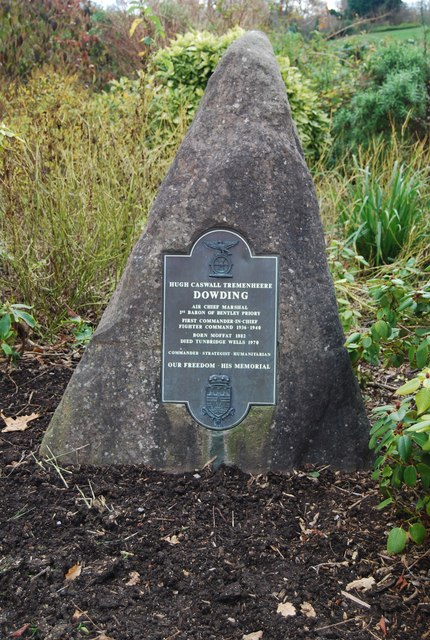
Memorial at Royal Tunbridge Wells

A statue of Dowding stands outside St Clement Danes church on the Strand, London. The inscription reads:

Air Chief Marshal Lord Dowding was commander-in-chief of Fighter Command, Royal Air Force, from its formation in 1936 until November 1940. He was thus responsible for the preparation for and the conduct of the Battle of Britain. With remarkable foresight, he ensured the equipment of his command with monoplane fighters, the Hurricane and the Spitfire. He was among the first to appreciate the vital importance of R.D.F. (radar) and an effective command and control system for his squadrons. They were ready when war came. In the preliminary stages of that war, he thoroughly trained his minimal forces and conserved them against strong political pressure to disperse and misuse them. His wise and prudent judgement and leadership helped to ensure victory against overwhelming odds and thus prevented the loss of the Battle of Britain and probably the whole war. To him, the people of Britain and of the Free World owe largely the way of life and the liberties they enjoy today.

Other monuments to Dowding can be found in Station Park in Moffat, the town of his birth, and in Calverley Gardens in Tunbridge Wells near to where he died. The RAF Association in conjunction with the RAF Benevolent Fund, purchased his birthplace, the former St Ninian's School, Moffat; the building was renamed Dowding House and restored to provide sheltered housing for former members of the Royal Air Force or their dependents.

The Dowding Centre at the School of Aerospace Battle Management (formerly the School of Fighter Control) at RAF Boulmer is named after Dowding.

A green ceramic commemorative plaque was unveiled at his former residence (1951–1967) in Darnley Drive, Southborough on 6 May 2012.

Dowding Place, Stanmore, the site of former RAF Stanmore Park is named after him.

The 1946-built Southern Railway Battle of Britain pacific (4-6-2) locomotive 21C152 was named Lord Dowding in his honour.

Coat of arms of Hugh Dowding
Crest Upon a catherine wheel Azure a falcon rising Or belled and hooded Gules. Escutcheon Argent three bars gemel Sable overall a fleur-de-lis Azure on a chief of the second three Doric columns of the first. Motto Laborare Est Orare Orders Knight Grand Cross of the Order of the Bath, Companion of the Order of St Michael and St George, Knight Grand Cross of the Royal Victorian Order.

== See also ==
- List of animal rights advocates

== Sources ==
- Bowen, E. G. (1987). Radar Days. Bristol, UK: Adam Hilger. ISBN 0-85274-590-7.
- Carver, Michael (2005). The Warlords. Pen & Sword. ISBN 978-1844153084.
- Deighton, Len (1980). Battle of Britain. London: Michael Joseph. ISBN 0-7181-3441-9.
- Deighton, Len (2000). Fighter The True Story of the Battle of Britain. Edison: Castle Books. ISBN 0-7858-1208-3.
- Dixon, J. E. G. (2009). Dowding and Churchill: The Dark Side of the Battle of Britain. Barnsley, South Yorkshire, UK: Pen & Sword Books. ISBN 978-1-84415-854-6.
- Grinnell-Milne, D. (1933). Wind in the Wires. London: Aviation Book Club. OCLC 7955618.
- Korda, Michael (2009). With Wings Like Eagles. New York: HarperCollins. ISBN 978-0-06-173603-2.
- McKinstry, Leo (2010). Hurricane: Victor of the Battle of Britain. John Murray (Publishers). ISBN 978-1-84854-339-3.
- Murray, Williamson; Millett, Allan R (2000). A War To Be Won: Fighting the Second World War. Cambridge: Belknap Press. ISBN 0674006801.
- Orange, Vincent (2008). Dowding of Fighter Command: Victor of the Battle of Britain. London: Grub Street. ISBN 978-1-906502-14-0.
- Waugh, S; Wright, J. (2010). War and the Transformation of British Society 1931–1951. London: Hodder Education. ISBN 978-0-340-98435-2.
- Wright, Robert (1970). Dowding and the Battle of Britain. Corgi Childrens. ISBN 978-0552085113.

Military offices
Preceded by Felton Holt	Officer Commanding No. 16 Squadron; 23 July 1915 – January 1916	Succeeded by D.W. Powell
Preceded by Vyell Vyvyan	Air Officer Commanding Northern Area; 1919	Succeeded by John Higgins
Unknown	Officer Commanding No. 16 Group; 1919–1920	Vacant Group disbanded
Preceded by John Becke	Officer Commanding No. 1 Group; 1920–1922	Succeeded by Eugene Gerrard
Preceded by Thomas Higgins	Director of Training; 1926–1929	Succeeded by William Mitchell
Preceded by Patrick Playfair	Air Officer Commanding RAF Transjordan and Palestine; September–December 1929	Succeeded by Patrick Playfair
Preceded by Sir John Higgins	Air Member for Supply and Research; 1 September 1930 – 14 January 1935	Succeeded by Himself; As Air Member for Research and Development
Preceded by Sir John Higgins	Air Member for Supply and Research; 1 September 1930 – 14 January 1935	Succeeded by Cyril Newall; As Air Member for Supply and Organisation
New title Created from part of the remit of the Air Member for Supply and Research	Air Member for Research and Development; 14 January 1935 – 1 April 1936	Succeeded by Wilfrid Freeman
New title Command established	Commander-in-Chief Fighter Command; 1936–1940	Succeeded by Sir Sholto Douglas
Peerage of the United Kingdom
New creation	Baron Dowding; 1943–1970	Succeeded by Derek Dowding
