= Maragato =

Spanish inhabitants

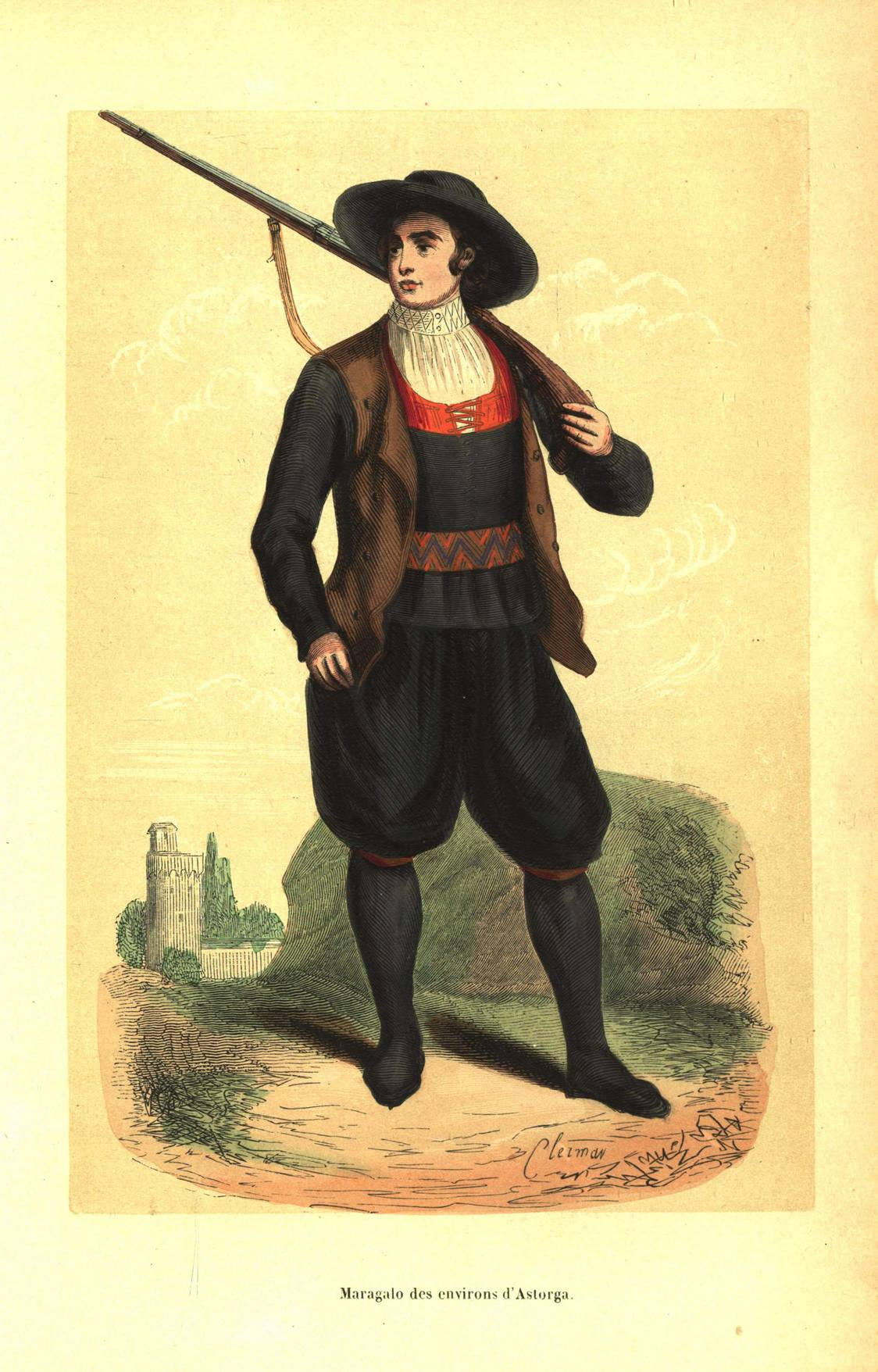
Illustration of a maragato from the mid-19th century

Maragato refers both to the modern inhabitants of the region of Maragatería in the Province of León, Spain, as well as historically and specifically to the isolated merchants and muleteers from that area. Historically the maragatos faced social discrimination.

== Etymology ==
Several theories exist for the origins of the term maragato. Francisco Javier Rodríguez Pérez suggests that it comes from the Latin mericator (merchant). Laureano Rubio suggests it is a contraction of the phrase "del mar a los gatos", referring to them transporting salted fish from Galicia (the sea, "el mar") to Madrid (the cats, "los gatos", a nickname that stems from a medieval myth). The 17th century friar Pedro de Alba y Astorga suggested it originated from maurisco meaning "brave warrior".

== Origins ==
The exact origins of the maragatos as a distinct group are unknown. The 18th century friar Martín Sarmiento collected many of the stories of the potential origins of the maragatos in his Discurso crítico sobre el origen de los maragatos.

== See also ==
- Agotes
- Cascarots
- Gitanos
- Vaqueiros de alzada
- Xueta
