= Untouchability =

Discriminatory practices against certain social groups

Untouchability is a form of social institution that legitimises and enforces practices that are discriminatory, humiliating, exclusionary and exploitative against people belonging to certain social groups. Untouchability also refers to the condition of belonging to such groups, members of whom are historically called untouchables, outcastes, or archaically pariahs. Although comparable forms of discrimination are found all over the world, untouchability involving the caste system is largely unique to South Asia.

The term is most commonly associated with treatment of the Dalit communities in the Indian subcontinent who were considered "polluting". The term has also been used to refer to other groups, including the Burakumin of Japan, the Baekjeong of Korea, and the Ragyabpa of Tibet, as well as the Romani people and Cagot in Europe, and the Al-Akhdam in Yemen. Traditionally, the groups characterized as untouchable were those whose occupations and habits of life involved ritually "polluting" activities, such as pursuing a career based on killing (e.g. fishermen) or engaging in common contact with others' feces or sweat (e.g. manual scavengers, sweepers and washermen).

According to Patrick Olivelle’s interpretation of some of the religious Hindu texts, untouchables were not considered a part of the varna system. Therefore, they were not treated like the savarnas (Brahmins, Kshatriyas, Vaishyas and Shudras).

Due to many caste-based discriminations in Nepal, the government of Nepal legally abolished the caste-system and criminalized any caste-based discrimination, including "untouchability", in 1963.

Untouchability has been outlawed in India, Nepal and Pakistan. However, "untouchability" has not been legally defined. The origin of untouchability and its historicity are still debated. A 2020 study of a sample of households in India concludes that "Notwithstanding the likelihood of under-reporting of the practice of untouchability, 70 percent of the population reported not indulging in this practice. This is an encouraging sign."

== Origin ==
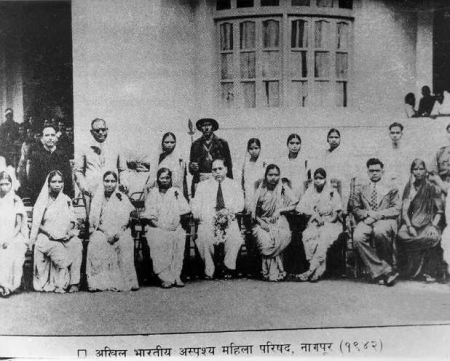
B. R. Ambedkar with the leaders and activists of the All India Untouchable Women Conference held at Nagpur in 1942

B. R. Ambedkar, an Indian social reformer and politician who came from a social group that was considered untouchable, theorized that untouchability originated because of the deliberate policy of the Brahmins. According to him, the Brahmanas despised the people who gave up the Brahmanism in favour of Buddhism. Later scholars such as Vivekanand Jha have refuted this theory.

Nripendra Kumar Dutt, a professor of history, theorized that the concept of untouchability originated from the "pariah"-like treatment accorded to the indigenous people of India by the early Dravidians, and that the concept was borrowed by the Indo-Aryans from the Dravidians. Scholars such as R. S. Sharma have rejected this theory, arguing that there is no evidence that Dravidians practised untouchability before coming into contact with the Indo-Aryans.

Austrian ethnologist Christoph von Fürer-Haimendorf theorized that untouchability originated as class stratification in urban areas of the Indus Valley civilisation. According to this theory, the poorer workers involved in 'unclean' occupations such as sweeping or leather work were historically segregated and banished outside the city limits. Over time, personal cleanliness came to be identified with "purity", and the concept of untouchability eventually spread to rural areas as well. After the decline of the Indus Valley towns, these untouchables probably spread to other parts of India. Scholars such as Suvira Jaiswal reject this theory, arguing that it lacks evidence, and does not explain why the concept of untouchability is more pronounced in rural areas.

American scholar George L. Hart, based on his interpretation of Old Tamil texts such as Purananuru, traced the origin of untouchability to ancient Tamil society. According to him, in this society, certain occupational groups were thought to be involved in controlling the malevolent supernatural forces; as an example, Hart mentions the Paraiyars, who played the drums during battles and solemn events such as births and deaths. People from these occupational groups came to be avoided by others, who believed that they were "dangerous and had the power to pollute the others". Jaiswal dismisses the evidence produced by Hart as "extremely weak" and contradictory. Jaiswal points out that the authors of the ancient Tamil texts included several Brahmanas (a fact accepted by Hart); thus, the society described in these texts was already under Brahmanical influence, and could have borrowed the concept of untouchability from them.

British anthropologist John Henry Hutton traced the origin of untouchability to the taboo on accepting food cooked by a person from a different caste. This taboo presumably originated because of cleanliness concerns, and ultimately, led to other prejudices such as the taboo on marrying outside one's caste. Jaiswal argues that this theory cannot explain how various social groups were isolated as untouchable or accorded a social rank. Jaiswal also notes that several passages from the ancient Vedic texts indicate that there was no taboo against accepting food from people belonging to a different varna or tribe. For example, some Shrauta Sutras mandate that a performer of the Vishvajit sacrifice must live with the Nishadas (a tribe regarded as untouchable in later period) for three days, in their village, and eat their food.

Scholars such as Suvira Jaiswal, R. S. Sharma, and Vivekanand Jha characterize untouchability as a relatively later development after the establishment of the varna and caste system. Jha notes that the earliest Vedic text Rigveda makes no mention of untouchability, and even the later Vedic texts, which revile certain groups such as the Chandalas, do not suggest that untouchability existed in the contemporary society. According to Jha, in the later period, several groups began to be characterized as untouchable, a development which reached its peak during 600–1200 AD. Sharma theorizes that institution of untouchability arose when the aboriginal tribes with "low material culture" and "uncertain means of livelihood" came to be regarded as impure by the privileged classes who despised manual labour, and regarded associated impurity with "certain material objects". According to Jaiswal, when the members of aboriginal groups were assimilated into the Brahmanical society, the privileged among them may have tried to assert their higher status by disassociating themselves from their lower-status counterparts, who were gradually branded as untouchables.

According to the Dharmashastras which are ancient legal codes from various kingdoms in ancient India, certain peoples grouped either by ethnicity or profession were not considered a part of the varna based society. Therefore, they were not treated like the savarnas (Brahmins, Kshatriyas, Vaishyas and Shudras).

== Characteristics ==
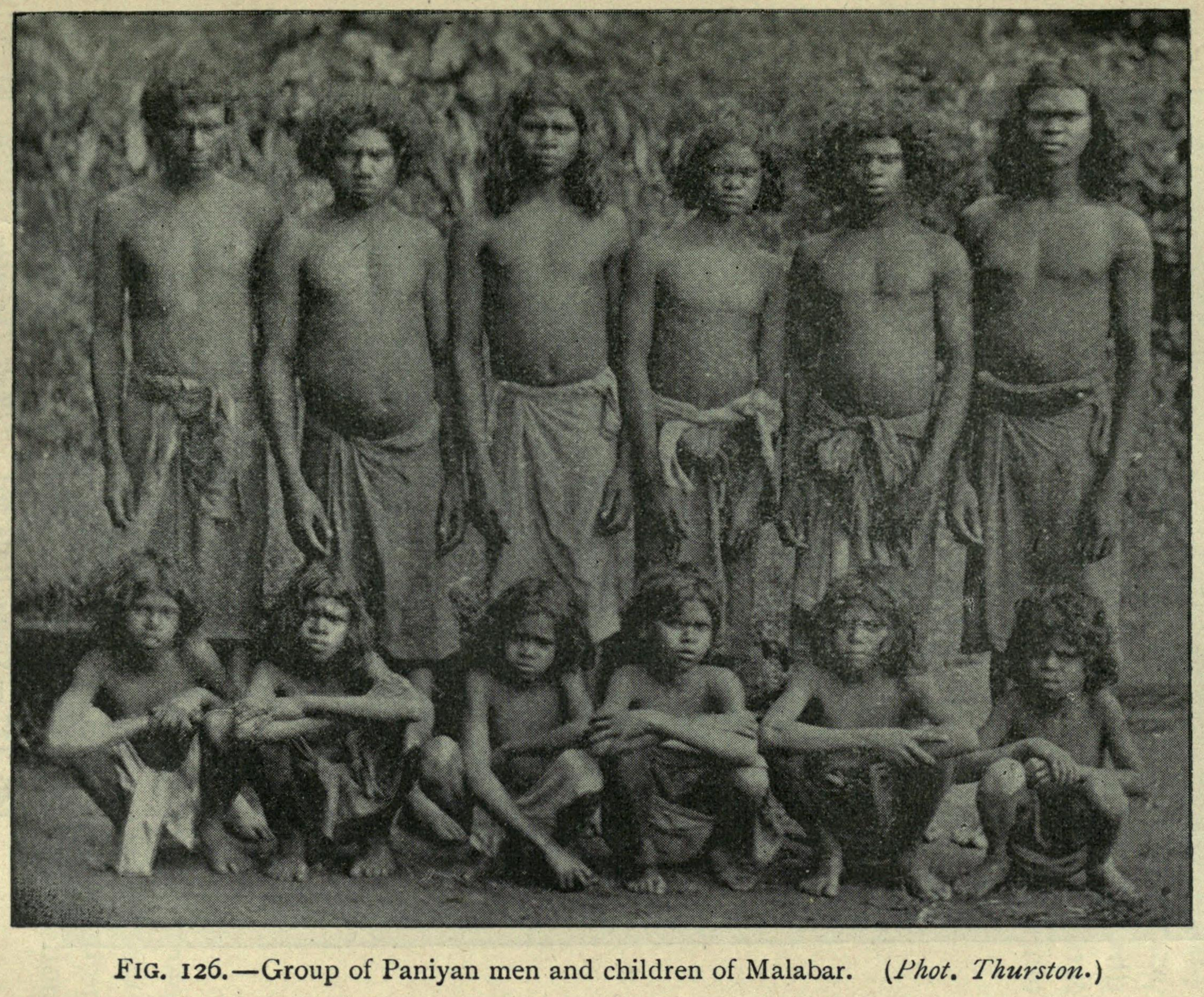
People regarded as "untouchables" in Malabar, Kerala (1906 A.D.)

According to Sarah Pinto, an anthropologist, modern untouchability in India applies to people whose work relates to "meat, and bodily fluids". Based on the punishments prescribed in The Untouchability (Offences) Act, 1955 the following practices could be understood to have been associated with Untouchability in India:

- Prohibition from eating with other members
- Provision of separate cups in village tea stalls
- Separate seating arrangements and utensils in restaurants
- Segregation in seating and food arrangements at village functions and festivals
- Prohibition from entering places of public worship
- Prohibition from wearing sandals or holding umbrellas in front of higher caste members
- Prohibition from entering other caste homes
- Prohibition from using common village paths
- Separate burial/cremation grounds
- Prohibition from accessing common/public properties and resources (wells, ponds, temples, etc.)
- Segregation (separate seating area) of children in schools
- Bonded labour
- Social boycotts by other castes for refusing to perform their "duties"

Ramnarayan Rawat, a professor of history, argues that restricting caste groups to "traditional and "ritually impure" jobs is the biggest contributing factor to "the continued subordination of Dalits."

== Government action in India ==
India is home to over 200 million Dalits. At the time of Indian independence, Dalit activists began calling for separate electorates for untouchables in India to allow fair representation. Officially labeled the Minorities Act, it would guarantee representation for Sikhs, Muslims, Christians, and Untouchables in the newly formed Indian government. The Act was supported by British representatives such as Ramsay MacDonald. According to the textbook Religions in the Modern World, B. R. Ambedkar, who was also a supporter of the Act, was considered to be the "untouchable leader" who made great efforts to eliminate caste system privileges that included participation in public festivals, access to temples, and wedding rituals. In 1932, Ambedkar proposed that the untouchables create a separate electorate that ultimately led Gandhi to fast until it was rejected.

A separation within Hindu society was opposed by national leaders at the time such as Gandhi, although he took no exception to the demands of the other minorities. He began a hunger strike, citing that such a separation would create an unhealthy divide within the religion. At the Round Table Conferences, he provided this explanation for his reasoning:

I don't mind untouchables if they so desire, being converted to Islam or Christianity. I should tolerate that, but I cannot possibly tolerate what is in store for Hinduism if there are two divisions set forth in the villages. Those who speak of the political rights of the untouchables don't know their India, don't know how Indian society is today constituted and therefore I want to say with all the emphasis that I can command that if I was the only person to resist this thing that I would resist it with my life.

Gandhi achieved some success through his hunger strike however Dalit activists faced pressure from the Hindu population at large to end his protest at the risk of his ailing health. The two sides eventually came to a compromise where the number of guaranteed seats for Untouchables would be increased at both central and provincial levels, but there would be a common electorate.

The 1950 national constitution of India legally abolished the practice of untouchability and provided measures for affirmative action in both educational institutions and public services for Dalits and other social groups who lie within the caste system. These are supplemented by official bodies such as the National Commission for Scheduled Castes and Scheduled Tribes. Despite this, prejudice, discrimination, segregation, and violence, based on untouchability, is still prevalent across India.

== Instances ==
- Brittany: Caquins
- China: Tanka people
- Europe: Romani people
- France and Spain: Cagots were historically untouchable groups of France and Spain.
- India: Dalits
- Japan: Burakumin
- Korea: Baekjeong in Korea were an "untouchable" group of Korea who traditionally performed jobs of executioner and butcher.
- Nigeria: Ohuhu and Osu
- Somalia: lower class Somali clans
- Tibet: Ragyabpa
- Yemen: Al-Akhdam

== See also ==
- Affirmative action
- Caste system in India
- Dharmaśāstra
- Discrimination
- Outcast (person)
- Prejudice
- Shudra
- Slavery
- Underclass
- Varna (Hinduism)
