= Romani people in the Basque Country =

Romani people arrived in the Basque Country in the Middle Ages India. The first evidence of the presence of Roma in the Basque Country dates back to 1435 and since then they have had a history based on persecution and misunderstanding.

== See also ==
- Cascarots
- Erromintxela language
- Romani people in Spain
- Romani people in France
