= Arizkun =

- village
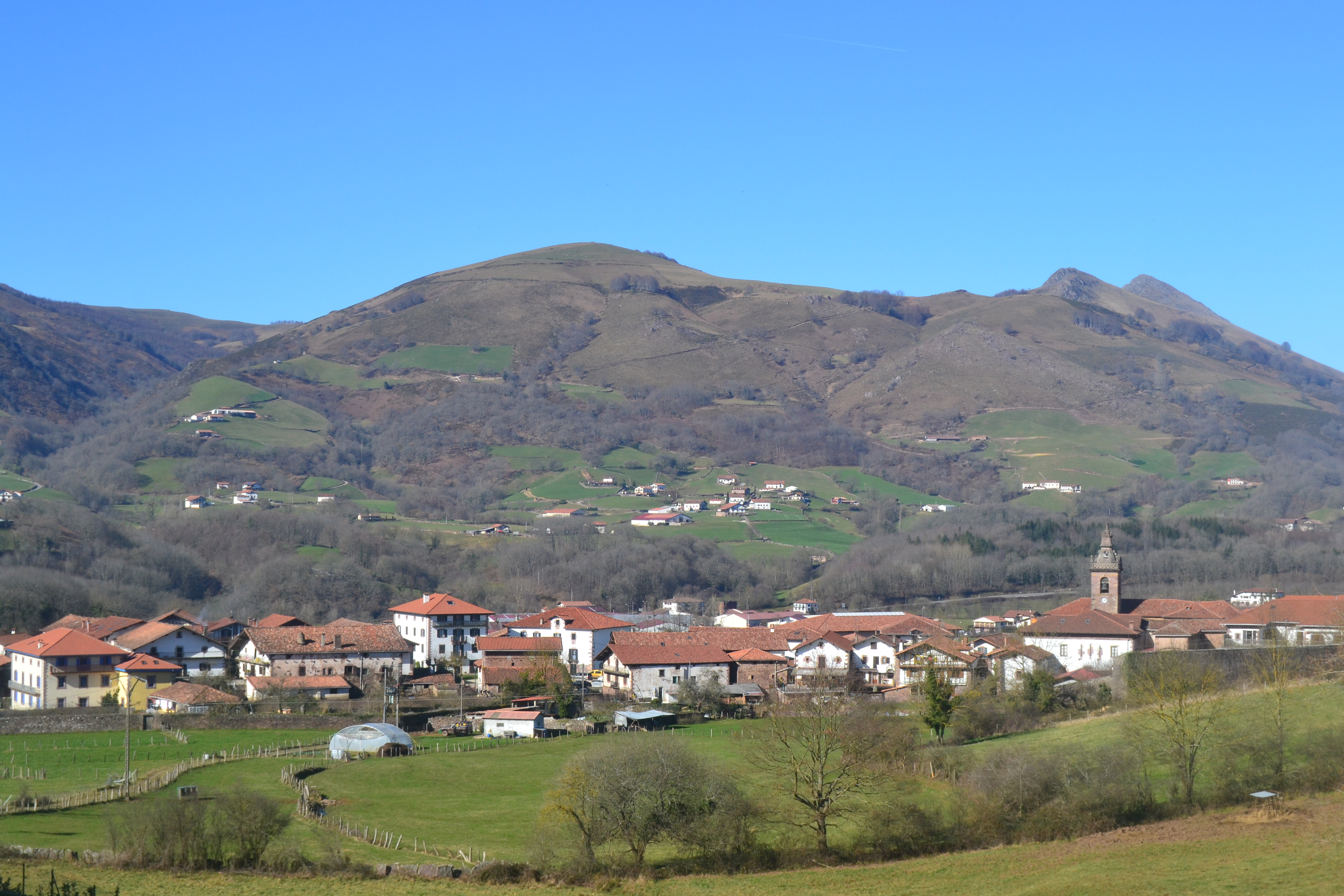

- Location in Navarre Location in Spain
- Coordinates: 43°10′25″N 1°29′06″W
- Country: Spain
- Community: Navarre
- Province: Navarre
- Special division: Baztan
- Municipality: Baztan

Population (2014)
  - Total: 577
- Time zone: UTC+1 (GMT)
  - Summer (DST): UTC+2 (GMT)

Arizkun is a village located in the municipality of Baztan, Navarre, Spain.

== Population ==
As per census 2023, Arizkun has a population of 225. This consists of 114 males (50.7%), and 111 females (49.3%).

== Hamlets ==
Arizkun is composed of the following hamlets:

- Aintzinalde
- Arizkun (main village)
- Bozate
- Ordoki
- Pertalats

== See also ==
- Cagot, a population which was last segregated in this area
