= Cagot =

Historically persecuted caste of France and Spain

Cagots
Cagots/Agotes
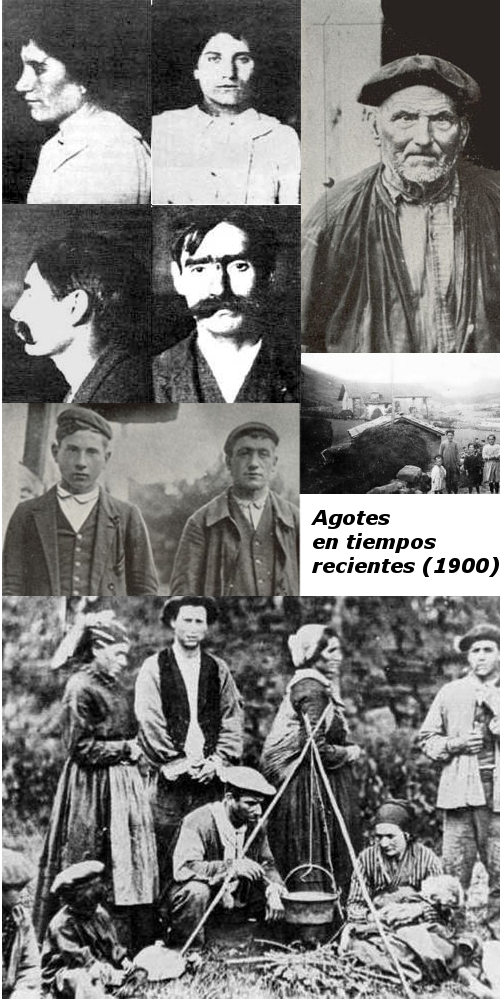
- A collage of photos taken of Agotes in Bozate at the beginning of the 20th Century

Total population
- Unknown

Regions with significant populations
- Spain (Basque Country and Navarre) and France (Nouvelle-Aquitaine and Occitania)

Languages
- French, Occitan, Spanish, Basque

Religion
- Predominately Roman Catholicism, with a minority Calvinism

Related ethnic groups
- Caquins, Cascarots, Occitans, Castilians

The Cagots (pronounced [ka.ɡo]) were a persecuted minority who lived in the west of France and northern Spain: the Navarrese Pyrenees, Basque provinces, Béarn, Aragón, Gascony and Brittany. Evidence of the group exists as far back as 1000 CE. The name they were known by varied across the regions where they lived. (Note: See Name Variations)

The origins of the Cagots remain uncertain, with various hypotheses proposed throughout history. Some theories suggest they were descendants of biblical or legendary figures cursed by God, or the descendants of medieval lepers, while others propose they were related to the Cathars or even a fallen guild of carpenters. Some suggest descent from a variety of other marginalized racial or religious groups. Despite the varied and often mythical explanations for their origins, the only consistent aspect of the Cagots was their societal exclusion and the lack of any distinct physical or cultural traits differentiating them from the general population.

The discriminatory treatment they faced included social segregation and restrictions on marriage and occupation. Despite laws and edicts from higher levels of government and religious authorities, this discrimination persisted into the 20th century.

The Cagots no longer form a separate social class and were largely assimilated into the general population. Very little of Cagot culture still exists, as most descendants of Cagots have preferred not to be known as such.

== Name ==
=== Etymology ===
The origins of both the term Cagots (and Agotes, Capots, Caqueux, etc.) and the Cagots themselves are uncertain. It has been suggested that they were descendants of the Visigoths defeated by Clovis I at the Battle of Vouillé, and that the name Cagot derives from caas ("dog") and the Old Occitan for Goth gòt around the 6th century. Yet in opposition to this etymology is the fact that the word cagot is first found in this form in 1542 in the works of François Rabelais. Seventeenth century French historian Pierre de Marca, in his Histoire de Béarn, propounds the reverse – that the word signifies "hunters of the Goths", and that the Cagots were descendants of the Saracens and Moors of Al-Andalus (or even Jews) after their defeat by Charles Martel, although this proposal was comprehensively refuted by the Prior of Livorno, Abbot Filippo Venuti as early as 1754. Antoine Court de Gébelin derives the term cagot from the Latin caco-deus, caco meaning "false, bad, deceitful", and deus meaning "god", due to a belief that Cagots were descended from the Alans and followed Arianism.

=== Variations ===
Names for Cagots around France

Their name differed by province and the local language:

- In Gascony they were called Cagots, Cagous and Gafets
- In Bordeaux they were called Ladres, Cahets or Gahetz
- In the Spanish Basque country they were called Agotes, Agotak and Gafos/Gaffos
- In the French Basque Country the forms Agotac and Agoth were also used.
- In Anjou, Languedoc, and Armagnac they were called Capots, and Gens des Marais (marsh people)
- In Brittany they were called Cacons, Cacous (possibly from the Breton word Cacodd meaning leprous), Caquots and Cahets. They were also sometimes referred to as Kakouz, Caqueux, Caquets, Caquins, and Caquous, names of the local Caquins of Brittany due to similar low stature and discrimination in society.
- In Bigorre they were also called Graouès and Cascarots
- In Aunis, Poitou, and Saintonge they were also called Colliberts, a name taken from the former class of colliberts. (Note: The colliberts were not restricted to the western coast of France, and were also found through the Alps and into Italy. In France records also use the names: colliberti, culvert, cuvert, cuilvert, culvert.)
- Gésitains or Gésites, alongside the French spellings Gézitains and Gézits, are also found in records, referencing Gehazi the servant of Elisha who was cursed with leprosy due to his greed. With the Parlement of Bordeaux recording descendants de la race de Giezy as an insult regularly used against Cagots. Giézitains is seen in the writings of Dominique Joseph Garat. Elizabeth Gaskell records the anglicised Gehazites in her work An Accursed Race.
- Other recorded names include Caffos, Essaurillés, Gaffots, Trangots, Caffets, Cailluands and Mézegs (most likely from the Old French mézeau meaning leper).

Previously some of these names had been viewed as being similar yet separate groups from the Cagots.

== Origin ==
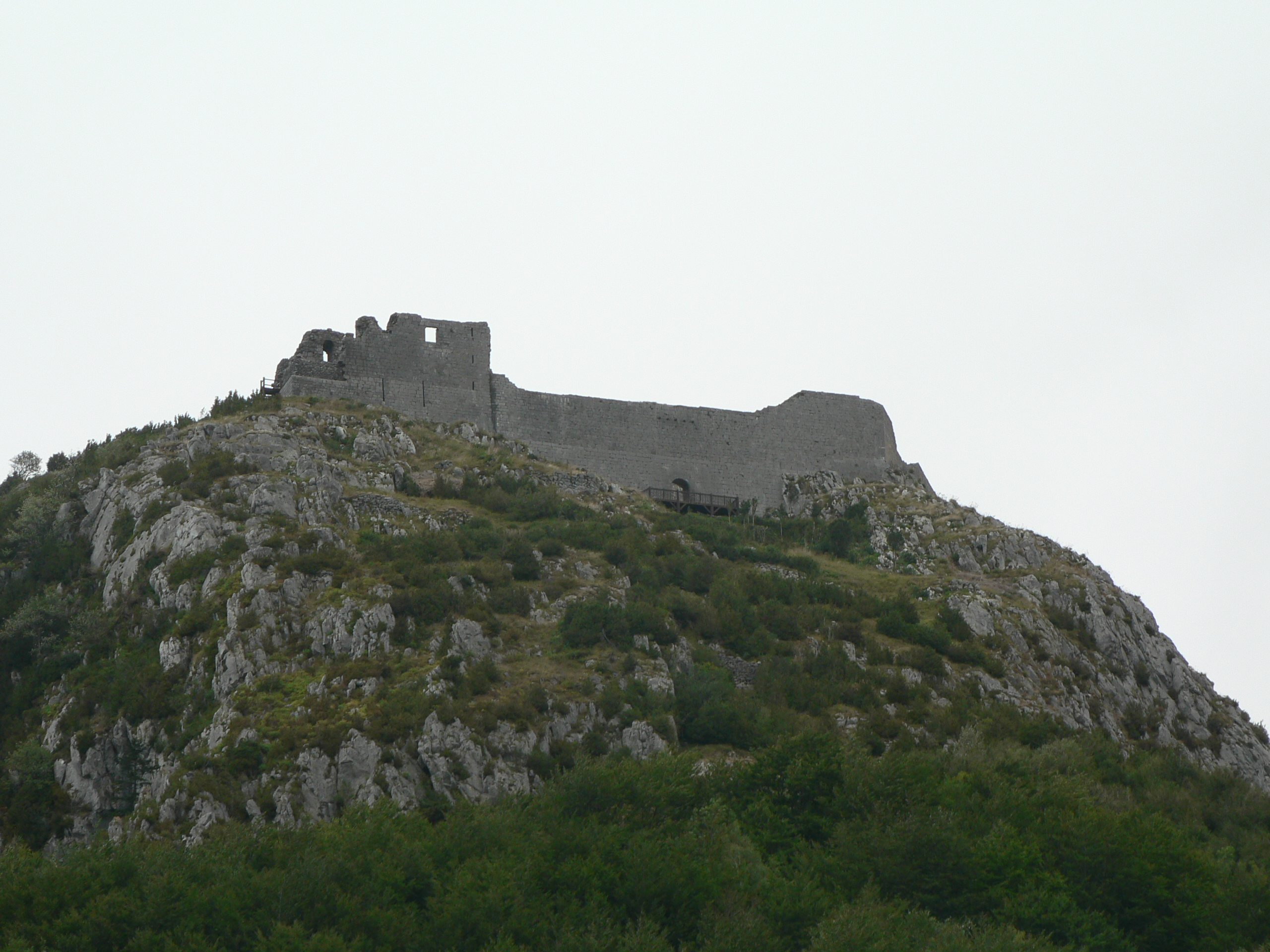
Château de Montségur near the Pyrenees, which was besieged as part of the Albigensian Crusade.

The origin of the Cagots is not known for certain, though through history many legends and hypotheses have been recorded providing potential origins and reasons for their ostracisation. The Cagots were not a distinct ethnic or religious group, but a racialised caste. They spoke the same language as the people in an area and generally kept the same religion as well, with later researchers remarking that there was no evidence to mark the Cagots as distinct from their neighbours. Their only distinguishing feature was their descent from families long identified as Cagots. Records of Cagots go as far back as the year 1000 CE, with the charter of the Abbaye Saint-Vincent de Lucq under the name chrestiens and the ancient charter of Navarre that referred to them as gaffos.

=== Biblical legends ===
Various legends placed the Cagots as originating from biblical events, including being descendants of the carpenters who made the cross that Jesus was crucified on, or being descendants of the bricklayers who built Solomon's Temple after being expelled from ancient Israel by God due to poor craftsmanship. Similarly a more detailed legend places the origins of the Cagots in Spain as being descendants of a Pyrenean master carver named Jacques, who traveled to ancient Israel via Tartessos, to cast Boaz and Jachin for Solomon's Temple. While in Israel he was distracted during the casting of Jachin by a woman, and due to the imperfection this caused in the column his descendants were cursed to suffer leprosy.

=== Religious origin ===
Another theory is that the Cagots were descendants of the Cathars, who had been persecuted for heresy in the Albigensian Crusade. Some comparisons include the use of the term crestians to refer to Cagots, which evokes the name that the Cathars gave to themselves, bons crestians. A delegation by Cagots to Pope Leo X in 1514 made this claim, though the Cagots predate the Cathar heresy and the Cathar heresy was not present in Gascony and other regions where Cagots were present. The historian Daniel Hawkins suggests that perhaps this was a strategic move, as in the limpieza de sangre statutes such discrimination and persecution for those convicted of heresy expired after four generations and if this was the cause of their marginalisation, it also gave grounds for their emancipation. Others have suggested an origin as Arian Christians.

The earliest recorded mention of the Cagots is in the charter of the Abbaye Saint-Vincent de Lucq under the name chrestiens. Another early mention of the Cagots is from 1288, when they appear to have been called Chretiens or Christianos. Other terms seen in use prior to the 16th century include Crestias, Chrestia, Crestiaa and Christianus, which in medieval texts became inseparable from the term leprosus, and so in Béarn became synonymous with the word leper. Thus, another theory is that the Cagots were early converts to Christianity, and that the hatred of their pagan neighbors continued after they also converted, merely for different reasons.

=== Medical origin ===
Another possible explanation of their name Chretiens or Christianos is to be found in the fact that in medieval times all lepers were known as pauperes Christi, and that, whether Visigoths or not, these Cagots were affected in the Middle Ages with a particular form of leprosy or a condition resembling it, such as psoriasis. Thus would arise the confusion between Christians and Cretins, and explain the similar restrictions placed on lepers and Cagots. Guy de Chauliac wrote in the 14th century, and Ambroise Paré wrote in 1561 of the Cagots being lepers with "beautiful faces" and skin with no signs of leprosy, describing them as "white lepers" (people afflicted with "white leprosy"). Later dermatologists believe that Paré was describing leucoderma. Early edicts apparently refer to lepers and Cagots as different categories of undesirables, with this distinction being explicit by 1593. The Parlement of Bordeaux and the Estates of Lower Navarre repeated customary prohibitions against them, with Bordeaux adding that when they were also lepers, if there still are any, they must carry clicquettes (rattles). One belief in Navarre were that the Agotes were descendants of French immigrant lepers to the region. Later English commentators supported the idea of an origin among a community of lepers due to the similarities in the treatment of Cagots in churches and the measures taken to allow lepers in England and Scotland to attend churches.

=== Other origins ===
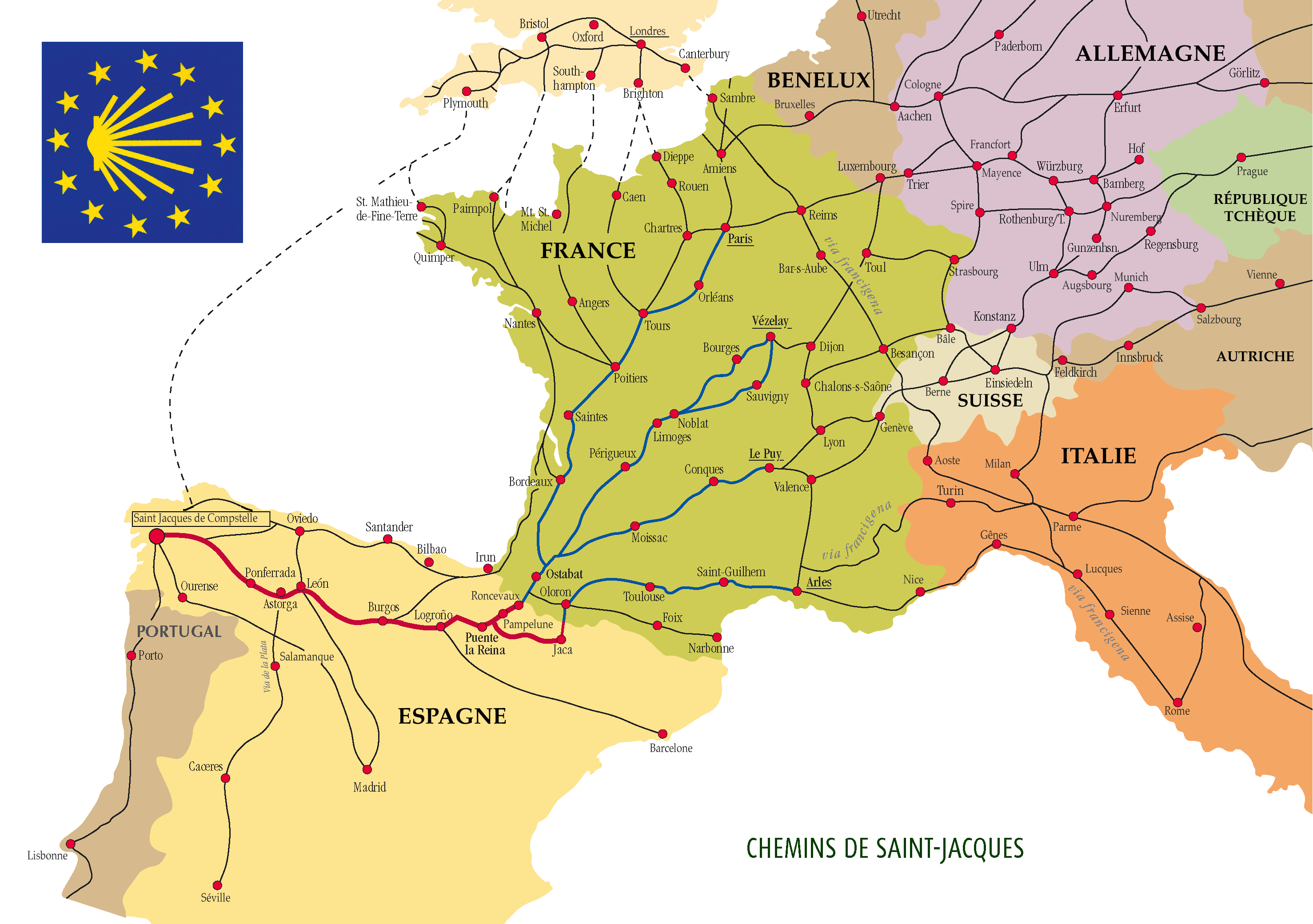
The Way of St. James; the anti-Cagot prejudice existed in northern Spain, Western France, and Southern France, roughly coinciding with the main routes

In Bordeaux, where they were numerous, they were called ladres. This name has the same form as the Old French word ladre, meaning leper (ultimately derived from Latin Lazarus). It also has the same form as the Gascon word for thief (ultimately derived from Latin latrō, and cognate to the Catalan lladres and the Spanish ladrón meaning robber or looter), which is similar in meaning to the older, probably Celtic-origin Latin term bagaudae (or bagad), a possible origin of agote.

The alleged physical appearance and ethnicity of the Cagots varied wildly between legends and stories; some local legends (especially those that held to the leper theory) indicated that Cagots had blonde hair and blue eyes, while those favouring the Arab descent story said that Cagots were considerably darker. In Pío Baroja's work Las horas solitarias, he comments that Cagot residents of Bozate had both individuals with "Germanic" features as well as individuals with "Romani" features, this is also supported by others who investigated the Cagots in Bearn and the Basque Country, such as Philippe Veyrin who stated the "ethnic type" and names of Cagots were the same as the Basque within Navarre. Though people who set out to research the Cagots found them to be a diverse class of people in physical appearance, as diverse as the non-Cagot communities around them. One common trend was to claim that Cagots had no ears or no earlobes, or that one ear was longer than the other, with other supposed identifiers including webbed hands and/or feet, or the presence of goitres.

Biographer Graham Robb finds most of the above theories unlikely, highlighting the lack of distinguishing features among the Cagots, arguing that the only real differences were "after eight centuries of persecution, they tended to be more skillful and resourceful than the surrounding populations, and more likely to emigrate to America. They were feared because they were persecuted and might therefore seek revenge." Robb proposed the hypothesis that the Cagots are the descendants of a fallen medieval guild of carpenters. This hypothesis could explain their being restricted in their choice of trade. He further suggests that red webbed-foot symbol Cagots were sometimes forced to wear might have been the guild's original emblem. There was a brief construction boom on the Way of St. James pilgrimage route in the 9th and 10th centuries; this could have brought the guild both power and suspicion. A subsequent collapse of their business would have left a scattered, yet cohesive group in the areas where Cagots are known.

David Bell has stated that Robb's guild hypothesis, alongside much of the work in his The Discovery of France, "[fails] to understand most of the secondary works in his own bibliography" and is a "recycling of nineteenth-century myths." Historian Joseph A. Amato has stated that while it offers many detailed impressions of history, it does not provide much in the way of extended analyses and argumentations.

For similar reasons due to their restricted trades, the philosopher Christian Delacampagne suggests in his work L'invention du racisme: Antiquité et Moyen-Âge (The invention of racism: Antiquity and the Middle Ages), that a possible origin is as a culturally distinct community of woodsmen who were Christianised relatively late.

The medievalist Benoît Cursente has proposed that the Cagots developed as a group due to the rapidly changing social relations in the region of Béarn, coinciding with, and influenced by, the period when lepers were becoming segregated across France and Spain in the 13th century.

=== Genetic studies ===
From the 1940s to the 1950s a study of blood type analysis was performed on the Cagots of Bozate in Navarre. The blood type distribution showed more similarity with those observed in France among the French than those observed among the local Basque. Geneticist Pilar Hors uses this as support for the theory that the Cagots in Spain are descendants of French migrants, most likely from leper colonies.

In 2026, a genome-wide study of 125 individuals from Bozate and the wider Navarre region found that the Cagots were most closely genetically related to other local populations, especially the Basque and southwestern French people. The Cagots showed high levels of homozygosity and consanguinity consistent with their recorded history of long-term social isolation and endogamy. The study found no support for hypotheses of distant ancestry, including Middle Eastern, Jewish, North African, Muslim, Gothic, or Viking origins. The authors concluded that the Cathar hypothesis remains the most plausible of those previously proposed, while noting that multifactorial causes cannot be excluded.

== Geography ==
=== Distribution ===
The Cagots were present in France in Gascony to the Basque Country, but also in the north of Spain (in Aragon, south and north Navarre, and Asturias) where they are referred to commonly by the term Agotes.

Cagots were typically required to live in separate quarters, these hamlets were called crestianies and then from the 16th century cagoteries, which were often on the far outskirts of the villages. On the scale of Béarn, for example, the distribution of Cagots, often carpenters, was similar to that of other craftsmen, who were numerous mainly in the piedmont. Far from congregating in only a few places, the Cagots were scattered in over 137 villages and towns. Outside the mountains, 35 to 40% of communities had Cagots, especially the largest ones, excluding very small villages. The buildings making up the cagoteries are still present in many villages.

=== Toponomy ===
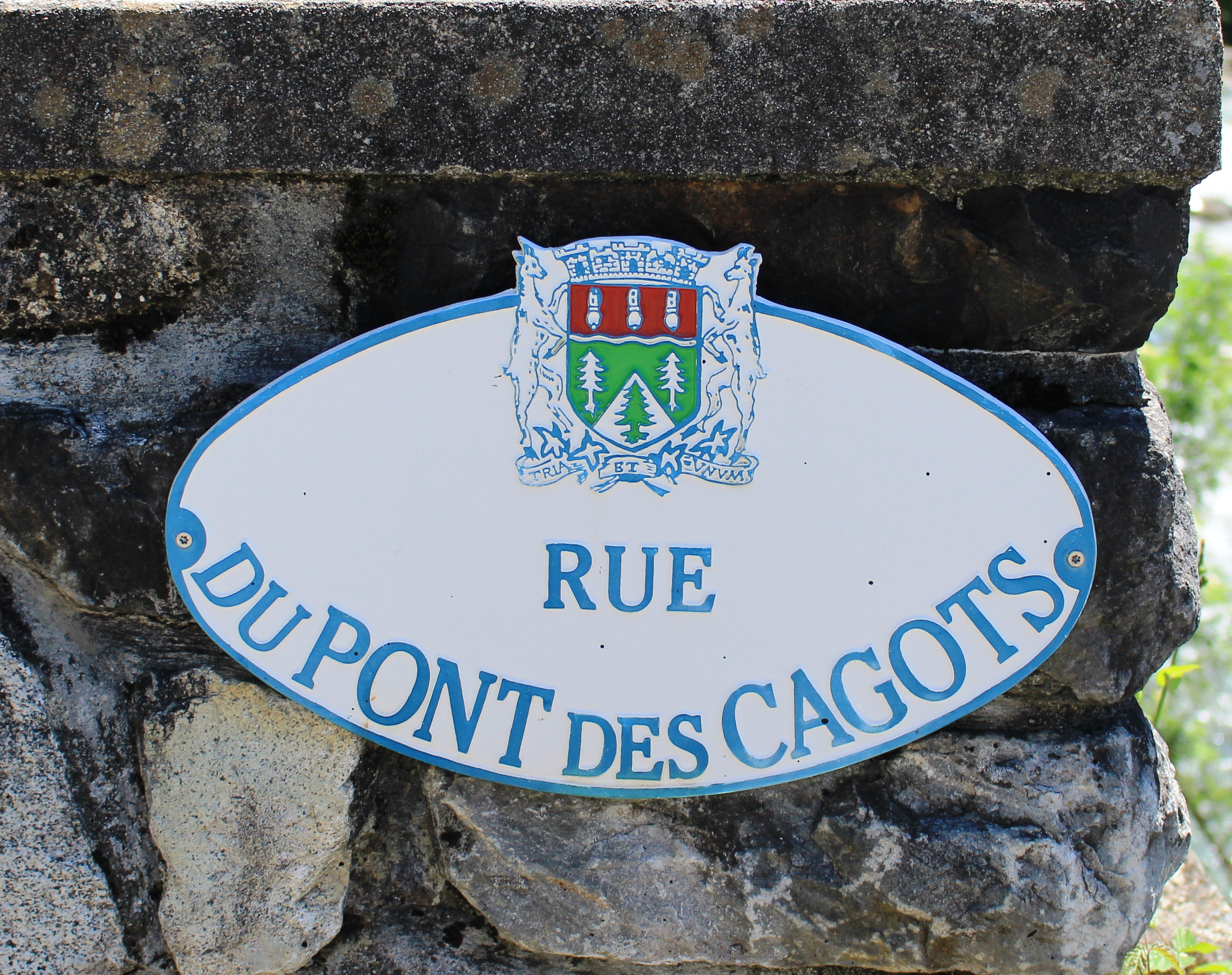
A sign for Rue du Pont des Cagots in Campan.

Due to the segregated housing that Cagots were required to live in, many toponyms feature the names which they were known by locally, indicating where the Cagots formerly lived. This toponymy and topography indicate that the places where the Cagots were found have constant characteristics; these are gaps, generally across rivers or outside town walls, called "crestian" (and derivatives) or "place" (Laplace names are frequent) next to water points, places allocated to live and to practice their trades.

Various street names are still in use such as Rue des cagots in the municipalities of Montgaillard and Lourdes, Impasse des cagots in Laurède, Place des cagots in Roquefort, Place des capots in Saint-Girons, and Rue des Capots in the municipalities of Mézin, Sos, Vic-Fezensac, Aire-sur-l'Adour, Eauze, and Gondrin.

In Aubiet, there is a locality called "les Mèstres". It was in this hamlet, that the cagots (Mèstres) of Aubiet lived, on the left bank of the Arrats, separated from the village by the river. The discovery of the name of the place allowed teachers to discover the local history of the Cagots and to start educational work. Until the beginning of the 20th century, several districts of Cagots still bore the name of Charpentier ("Carpenter").

== Discrimination ==
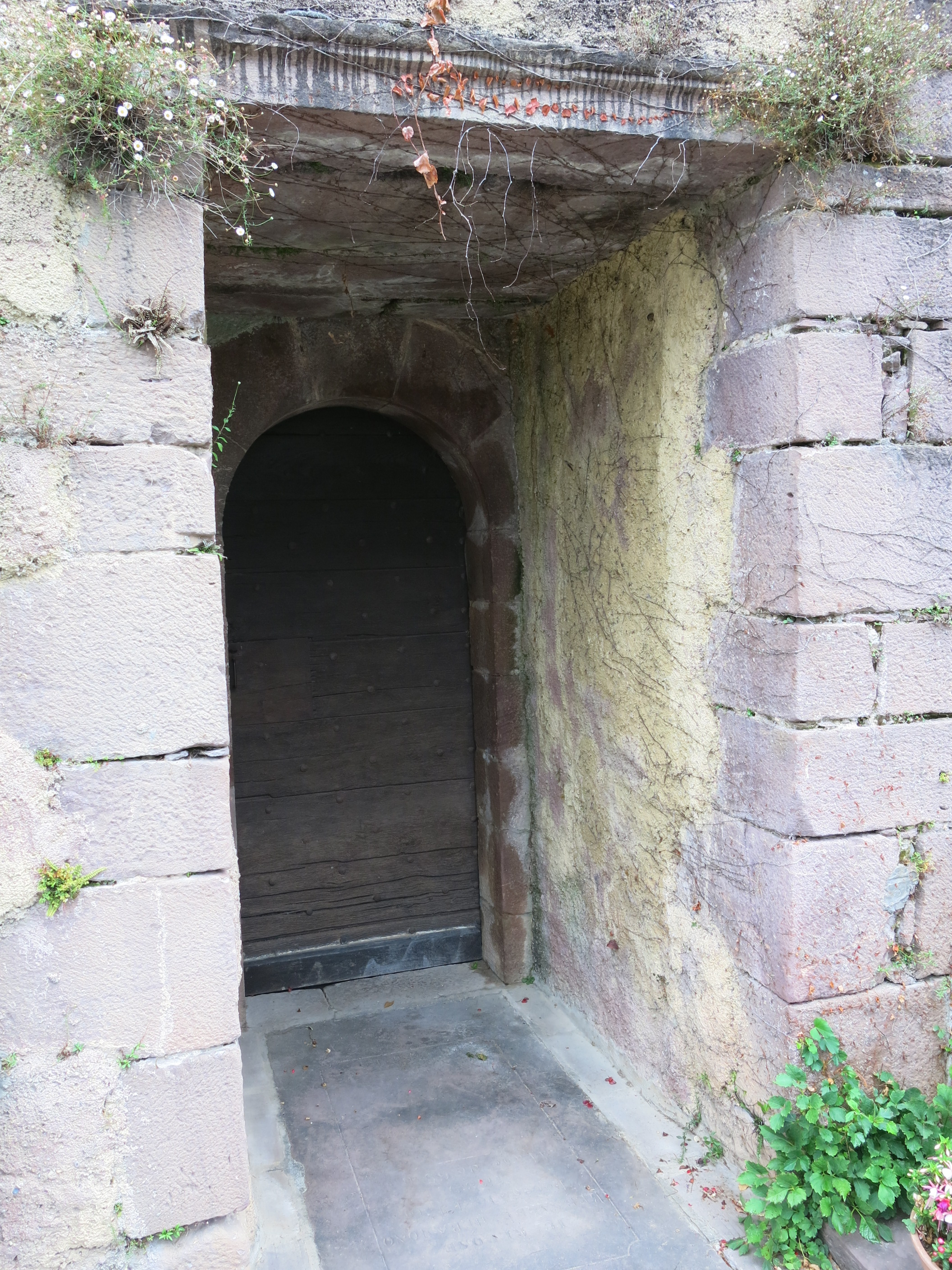
Former door for Cagots in the Church of Notre-Dame-de-l'Assomption in Bidarray

Cagots were shunned and hated; while restrictions varied by time and place, with many discriminatory actions being codified into law in France in 1460, they were typically required to live in separate quarters. Cagots were excluded from various political and social rights. The Cagots did have a culture of their own, but very little of it was written down or preserved; as a result, almost everything that is known about them relates to their persecution. The repression lasted through the Middle Ages, Renaissance, and Industrial Revolution, with the prejudice fading only in the 19th and 20th centuries.

=== Religious treatment ===
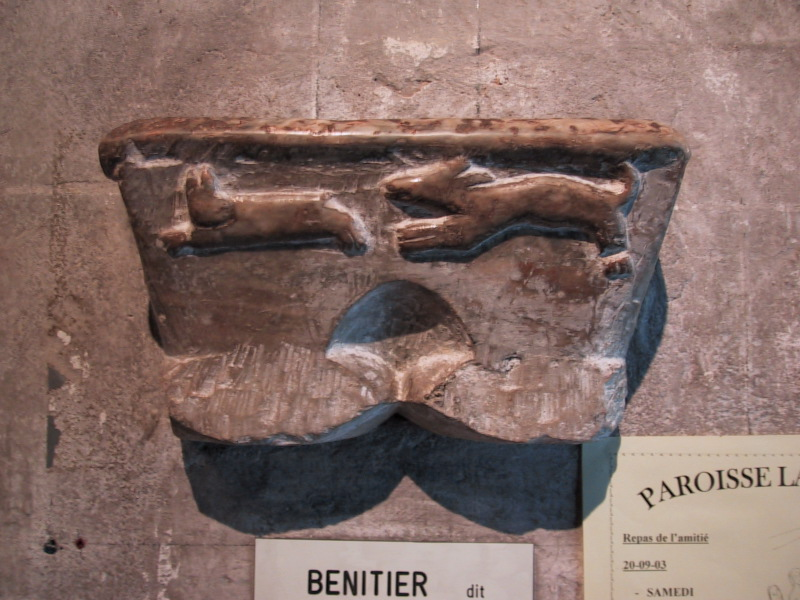
Holy water font for Cagots in the cathedral of Oloron, Béarn

While Cagots followed the same religion as the non-Cagots who lived around them, they were subject to variety of discriminatory practices in religious rites and buildings, this included being forced to use a side entrance to churches, often an intentionally low one to force Cagots to bow and remind them of their subservient status. This practice, done for cultural rather than religious reasons, did not change even between Catholic and Huguenot areas, as shown by historian Raymond A. Mentzer, who records how even when Cagots converted from Catholicism to Calvinism they were still subject to the same discriminatory practices, including in religious rites and rituals. Cagots were expected to slip into churches quietly and congregate in the worst seats. They had their own holy water fonts set aside for Cagots, and touching the normal font was strictly forbidden. These restrictions were taken seriously; with one story collected by Elizabeth Gaskell explaining the origin of the skeleton of a hand nailed to the church door in Quimperlé, Brittany, where in the 18th century, a wealthy Cagot had his hand cut off and nailed to the church door for daring to touch the font reserved for "clean" citizens.

=== Treatment by governments ===
Cagots were not allowed to marry non-Cagots leading to forced endogamy, though in some areas in the later centuries (such as Béarn) they were able to marry non-Cagots though the non-Cagot would then be classed as a Cagot. They were not allowed to enter taverns or use public fountains. The marginalization of the Cagots began at baptism where chimes were not rung in celebration as was the case for non-Cagots and that the baptisms were held at nightfall. Within parish registries the term cagot, or its scholarly synonym gezitan, was entered. From 1500, Cagots were buried in cemeteries separate from non-Cagots with reports of riots occurring if bishops tried to have the bodies moved to non-Cagot cemeteries. Commonly Cagots were not given a standard last name in registries and records but were only listed by their first name, followed by the mention "crestians" or "cagot", such as on their baptismal certificate, They were allowed to enter a church only by a special door and, during the service, a rail separated them from the other worshippers. They were forbidden from joining the priesthood. Either they were altogether forbidden to partake of the sacrament, or the Eucharist was given to them on the end of a wooden spoon, while a holy water stoup was reserved for their exclusive use. They were compelled to wear a distinctive dress to which, in some places, was attached the foot of a goose or duck (whence they were sometimes called Canards), and latterly to have a red representation of a goose's foot in fabric sewn onto their clothes. Whilst in Navarre a court ruling in 1623 required all Cagots to wear cloaks with a yellow trim to identify them as Cagots.

In Spanish territories Cagots were subject to the limpieza de sangre statutes (cleanliness of blood). These statutes established the legal discrimination, restriction of rights, and restriction of privileges of the descendants of Muslims, Jews, Romani, and Cagots.

=== Work ===
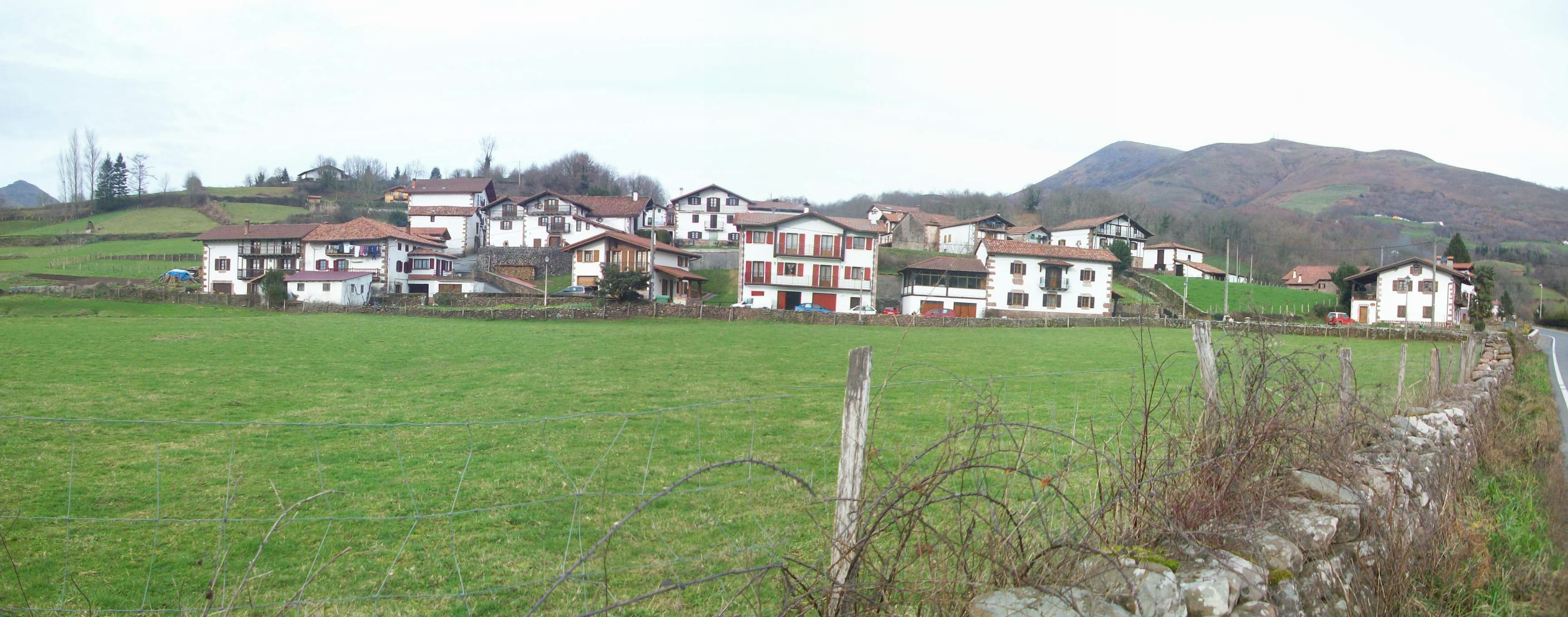
The neighborhood of Bozate in the town of Arizkun is a former ghetto of Navarrese Agotes, and is home to the Museo Etnográfico de los Agotes (Ethnographic Museum of the Agotes).

Cagots were prohibited from selling food or wine, touching food in the market, working with livestock, or entering mills. The Cagots were often restricted to craft trades including those of carpenter, mason, woodcutter, wood carver, cooper, butcher, and rope-maker. They were also often employed as musicians in Navarre. Cagots who were involved in masonry and carpentry were often contracted to construct major public buildings, such as churches, an example being the Protestant temple of Pau. Due to association with woodworking crafts, Cagots often worked as the operators of instruments of torture and execution, as well as making the instruments themselves. Such professions may have perpetuated their social ostracisation.

Cagot women were often midwives until the 15th century. Due to social exclusion, in France the Cagots were exempt from taxation until the 18th century. By the 19th century these restrictions seem to have been lifted, but the trades continued to be practiced by Cagots, along with other trades such as weaving and blacksmithing. Because the main identifying mark of the Cagots was the restriction of their trades to a few small options, their segregation has been compared to the caste system in India, with the Cagots being compared to the Dalits. More recently the treatment of the Cagots including the restriction to similar trades has drawn comparisons with the Burakumin of Japan.

=== Accusations and pseudo-medical beliefs ===
Few consistent reasons were given as to why Cagots were hated; accusations varied from them being cretins, lepers, heretics, cannibals, sorcerers, werewolves, sexual deviants, to actions they were accused of such as poisoning wells, or for simply being intrinsically evil. They were viewed as untouchables, with Christian Delacampagne noting how it was believed that they could cause children to fall ill by touching them or even just looking at them, being considered so pestilential that it was a crime for them to walk common roads barefooted or to drink from the same cup as non-Cagots. It was also a common belief that the Cagots gave off a foul smell. Joaquim de Santa Rosa de Viterbo recorded that many believed Cagots were born with a tail. Many Bretons believed that Cagots bled from their navel on Good Friday.

The belief of Cagots as a special class of lepers is recorded, and in part disproven, as early as 1390, where some Cagots who had migrated from the Basque country to Monzón in Aragon were accused by some Basques living in the town of being lepers of an especially virulent kind. The Cagots sought remediation from the town's magistrate, where every Cagot was then subjected to public medical examinations from multiple physicians. The result was that every Cagot was declared free of any disease, and those who levied the accusations had to formally apologise. Though despite this result, the accusations and their ill treatment persisted.

The French early psychiatrist Jean-Étienne Dominique Esquirol wrote in his 1838 works that the Cagots were a subset of "idiot", and separate from "cretins". By the middle of the 19th century, previous pseudo-medical beliefs and beliefs of them being intellectually inferior had waned and German doctors, by 1849, regarded them as "not without the ability to become useful members of society." Though various French and British doctors were continuing to label the Cagots as a race inherently afflicted with congenital disabilities to the end of the 19th century. Daniel Tuke wrote in 1880 after visiting communities where Cagots lived, noted how local people would not subject "cretins" born to non-Cagots to living with Cagots.

=== Cagot as pejorative ===
Philosopher Jacob Rogozinski highlights how even from as far back as the work of François Rabelais in the 16th century, the term cagot was used as a synonym for people viewed as deceitful and hypocritical. In contemporary language the term cagot has been further separated from it being the name of a distinct caste of people to being a pejorative term for any person who is "lazy" or "shameful". Similar transformations have occurred with the Spanish equivalent name agote.

== Antidiscrimination laws ==
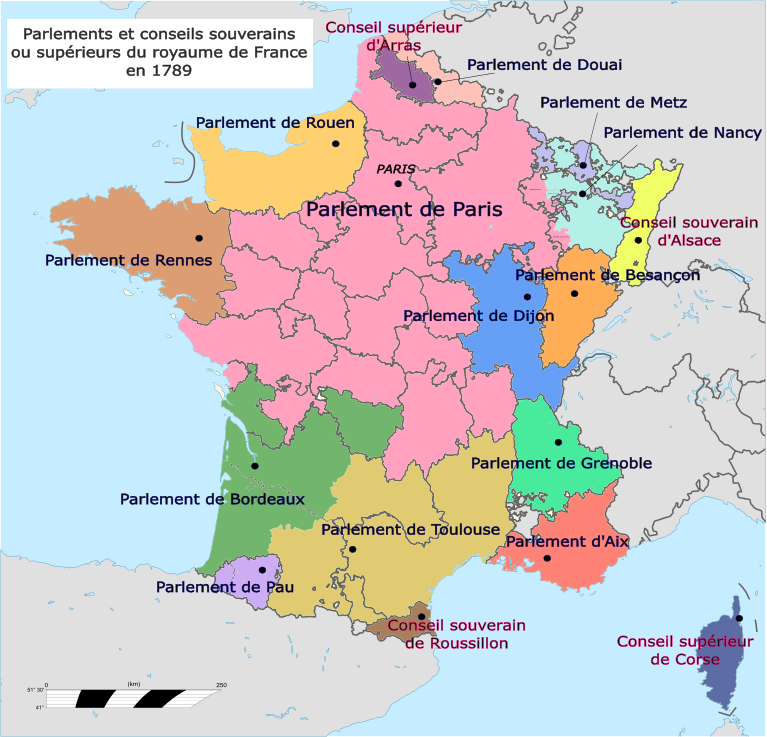
Territories assigned to the parlements and sovereign councils of the Kingdom of France in 1789

An appeal by the Cagots to Pope Leo X in 1514 was successful, with a papal rescript issued in 1515, instructing that the Cagots be treated "with kindness, in the same way as the other believers." Still, little changed, as most local authorities ignored the bull.

The nominal though usually ineffective allies of the Cagots were the government, the educated, and the wealthy. This included Charles V who officially supported tolerance of and improvements to the lives of Cagots. It has been suggested that the odd patchwork of areas which recognized Cagots has more to do with which local governments tolerated the prejudice, and which allowed Cagots to be a normal part of society. In a study in 1683, doctors examined the Cagots and found them no different from normal citizens. Notably, they did not actually suffer from leprosy or any other disease that could clarify their exclusion from society. The parlements of Pau, Toulouse and Bordeaux were informed of the situation, and money was allocated to improve the situation of the Cagots, but the populace and local authorities resisted.

Through many of the centuries Cagots in France and Spain came under the protection and jurisdiction of the church. In 1673, the Ursúa lords of the municipality of Baztán advocated for the recognition of the local Cagots as natural residents of the Baztán. Also in the 17th century Jean-Baptiste Colbert officially freed Cagots in France from their servitude to parish churches and from restrictions placed upon them, though in practicality nothing changed.

By the 18th century Cagots made up considerable portions of various settlements, such as in Baigorri where Cagots made up approximately 10% of the population.

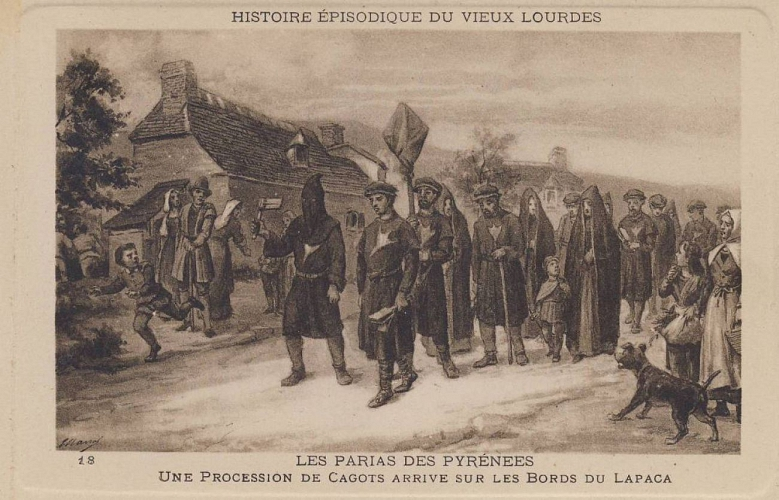
A 19th century French postcard titled Une procession de cagots arrive sur les bords du Lapaca (A procession of cagots arrives on the banks of the Lapaca), showing the feet of either geese or ducks attached to their clothing

In 1709, the influential politician Juan de Goyeneche planned and constructed the manufacturing town of Nuevo Baztán (after his native Baztán valley in Navarre) near Madrid. He brought many Cagot settlers to Nuevo Baztán, to both build the new town and be employed in the factories, but after some years, many returned to Navarre, unhappy with their working conditions.

Starting in 1723 the Parlement of Bordeaux instituted fines for anyone insulting any individual as "alleged descendants of the Giezy race, and treating them as agots, cagots, gahets or ladres", with the decree being reissued with an ever increasing fine until it reached of 500 French livres due to people ignoring the decree. ordering that they will be admitted to general and particular assemblies, to municipal offices and honors of the church, they may even be placed in the galleries and other places of the said church where they will be treated and recognized as the other inhabitants of the places, without any distinction; as also that their children will be received in the schools and colleges of the cities, towns and villages, and will be admitted in all the Christian instructions indiscriminately.

During the French Revolution substantive steps were taken to end discrimination toward Cagots. Revolutionary authorities claimed that Cagots were no different from other citizens, and de jure discrimination generally came to an end. And while their treatment did improve compared to previous centuries, local prejudice from the non-Cagot populace persisted, though the practice began to decline. Also, during the revolution, Cagots stormed record offices and burned birth certificates in an attempt to conceal their heritage. These measures did not prove effective, as the local populace still remembered, with rhyming songs keeping the names of Cagot families known.

== Prominent Cagots ==
Bertrand Dufresne was born in November 1736 in Navarrenx, he was a financier, senior civil servant, and politician. His father Nicolas Dufresne was a cordwainer from Versailles, who after moving to Bearn married Anne Campagnet, a local Cagot woman. In his teens Dufresne was able to move to Bayonne to work as a bank clerk under the tutelage of Jean-François de La Borde. He eventually became director of the treasury of France under both Louis XVI and Napoleon as the First Consul of the French Republic.

== Modern status ==
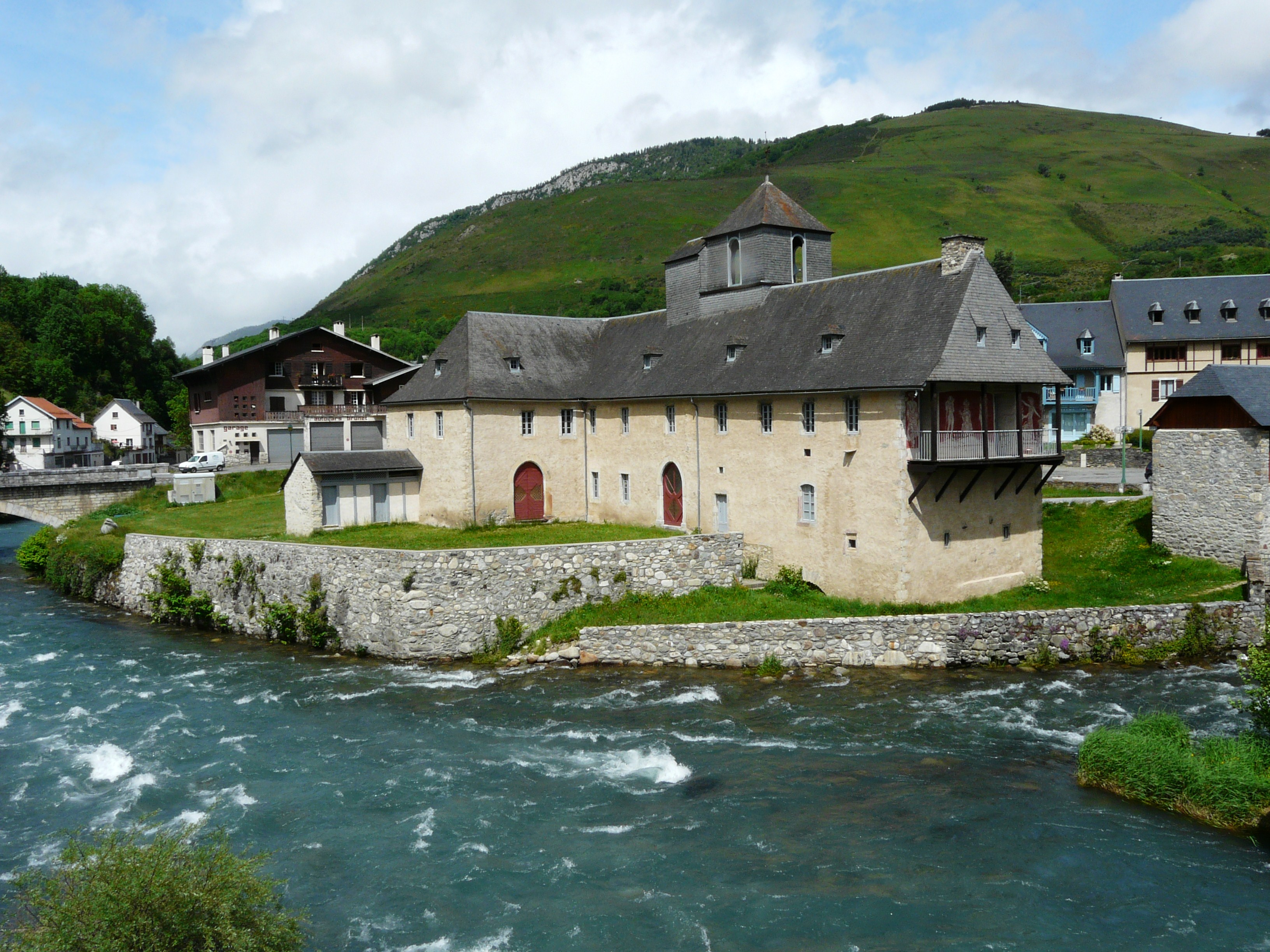
Château des Nestes in Arreau

Kurt Tucholsky wrote in his book on the Pyrenees in 1927: "There were many in the Argelès valley, near Luchon and in the Ariège district. Today they are almost extinct, you have to search hard if you want to see them". Examples of prejudice still occurred into the 19th and 20th century, including a scandal in the village of Lescun where in the 1950s a non-Cagot woman married a Cagot man.

There was a distinct Cagot community in Navarre until the early 20th century, with the small northern village called Arizkun in Basque (or Arizcun in Spanish) being the last haven of this segregation, where the community was contained within the neighbourhood of Bozate. Between 1915 and 1920 the Ursúa noble family sold the land that Cagots had worked for the Ursúa for centuries in the area of Baztan to the Cagot families. Family names in Spain still associated with having Cagot ancestors include: Bidegain, Errotaberea, Zaldua, Maistruarena, Amorena, and Santxotena.

The Cagots no longer form a separate social class and were largely assimilated into the general population. Very little of Cagot culture still exists, as most descendants of Cagots have preferred not to be known as such.

There are two museums dedicated to the history of the Cagots, one in the neighborhood of Bozate in the town of Arizkun, Spain, the Museo Etnográfico de los Agotes (Ethnographic Museum of the Agotes), opened by the sculptor and Cagot, Xabier Santxotena in 2003, and a museum in the Château des Nestes in Arreau, France.

In 2021 and 2022 anti-vaccination and anti-vaccine passport protestors in France started wearing the red goose's foot symbol that Cagots were forced to wear, and handed out cards explaining the discrimination against the Cagots.

== In media ==
References to Cagots as well as Cagots as characters have appeared in works throughout the past millennia. One of the earliest examples is the legend of the battle of 1373 that led to The Tribute of the Three Cows, the people of the French Barétous Valley are said to have been led by a Cagot with four ears. References to Cagots occur semi-regularly in French literary works such as in the 1793 French play Le jugement dernier des rois, by Sylvain Maréchal. The liberated subjects of the kings of Europe provide critiques of and insult their former rulers, where they say the Spanish king has "stupidity, cagotism and despotism [...] imprinted on his royal face".

Multiple references to Cagots have appeared in the poems of the 19th-century French poet Édouard Pailleron.

Multiple travellers to the Pyrenees upon learning about and seeing the Cagots were inspired to write of their conditions both in fictional and non-fictional works. Such travellers included the Irish author and diplomat Thomas Colley Grattan, whose 1823 story The Cagot's Hut details the otherness he perceived in the Cagots during his travels in the French Pyrenees, detailing many of the mythical features that became folklore about the Cagots appearance. In July 1841 the German poet Heinrich Heine visited the town of Cauterets and learned of the Cagots and their discrimination by others, subsequently becoming the topic of his poem Canto XV in Atta Troll. After travelling in southern France in 1853, Elizabeth Gaskell published her non-fiction work An Accursed Race, detailing the contemporary condition of the Cagots.

A character in Trevanian's novel Shibumi (1979) is named Beñat Le Cagot. He also used the name himself as a pen name.

More recently, the Basque director Iñaki Elizalde released a Spanish-language film titled Baztan in 2012. The film deals with a young man fighting against the discrimination he and his family have suffered for centuries due to being Cagots.

== Cagotic architecture ==
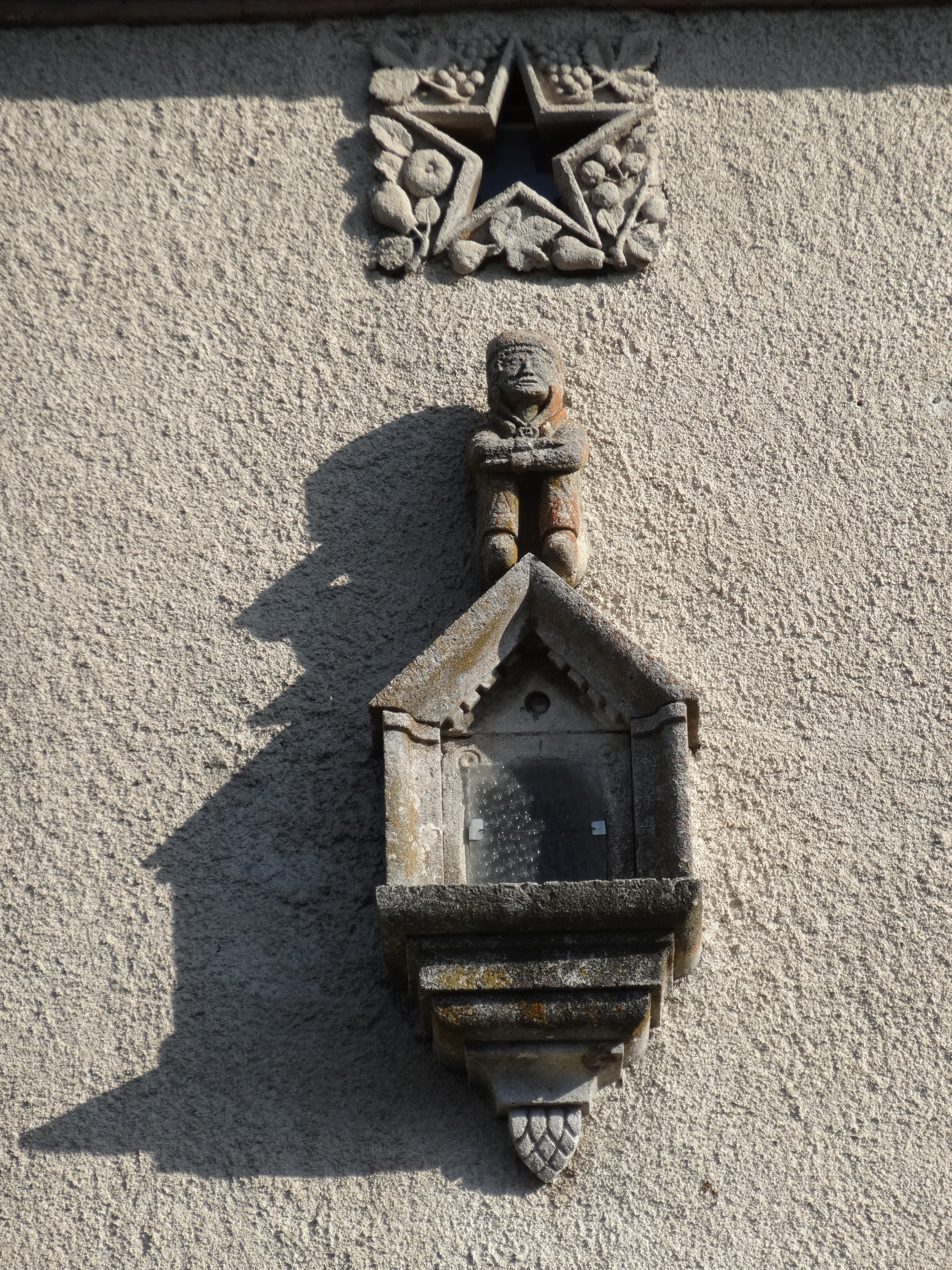
Protruding badge on the facade indicating the dwelling of a Cagot in Langogne (Lozère).

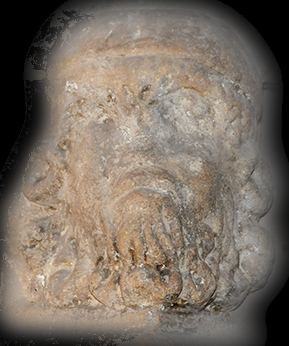
Sculpture of a "Cagot" in the Église Saint-Girons in Monein, which was built by the local cagot craftsmen in 1464.

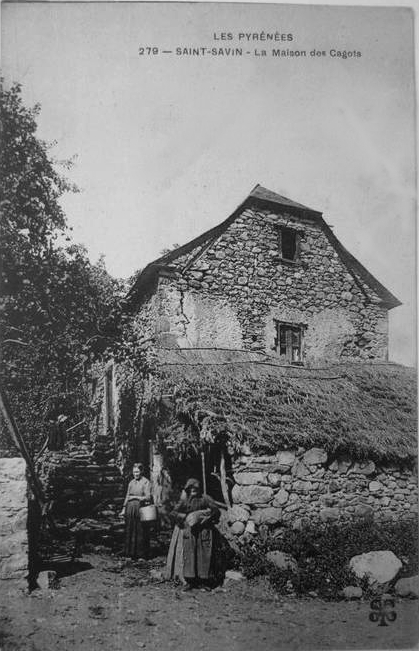
Cagot houses in the Mailhòc district (wooden mallet), Saint-Savin, 1906.

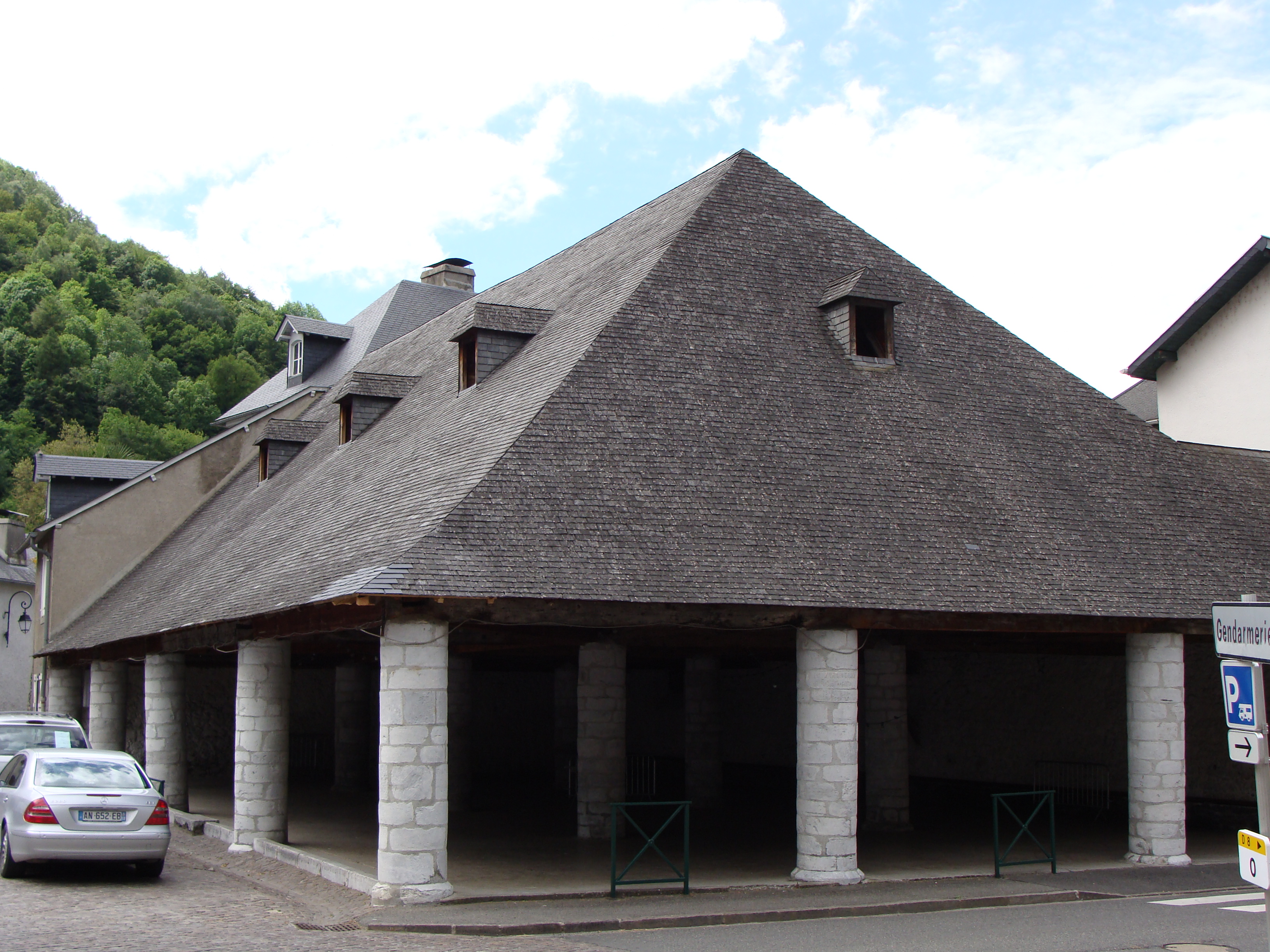
Halle de Campan which was built by the local Cagots.

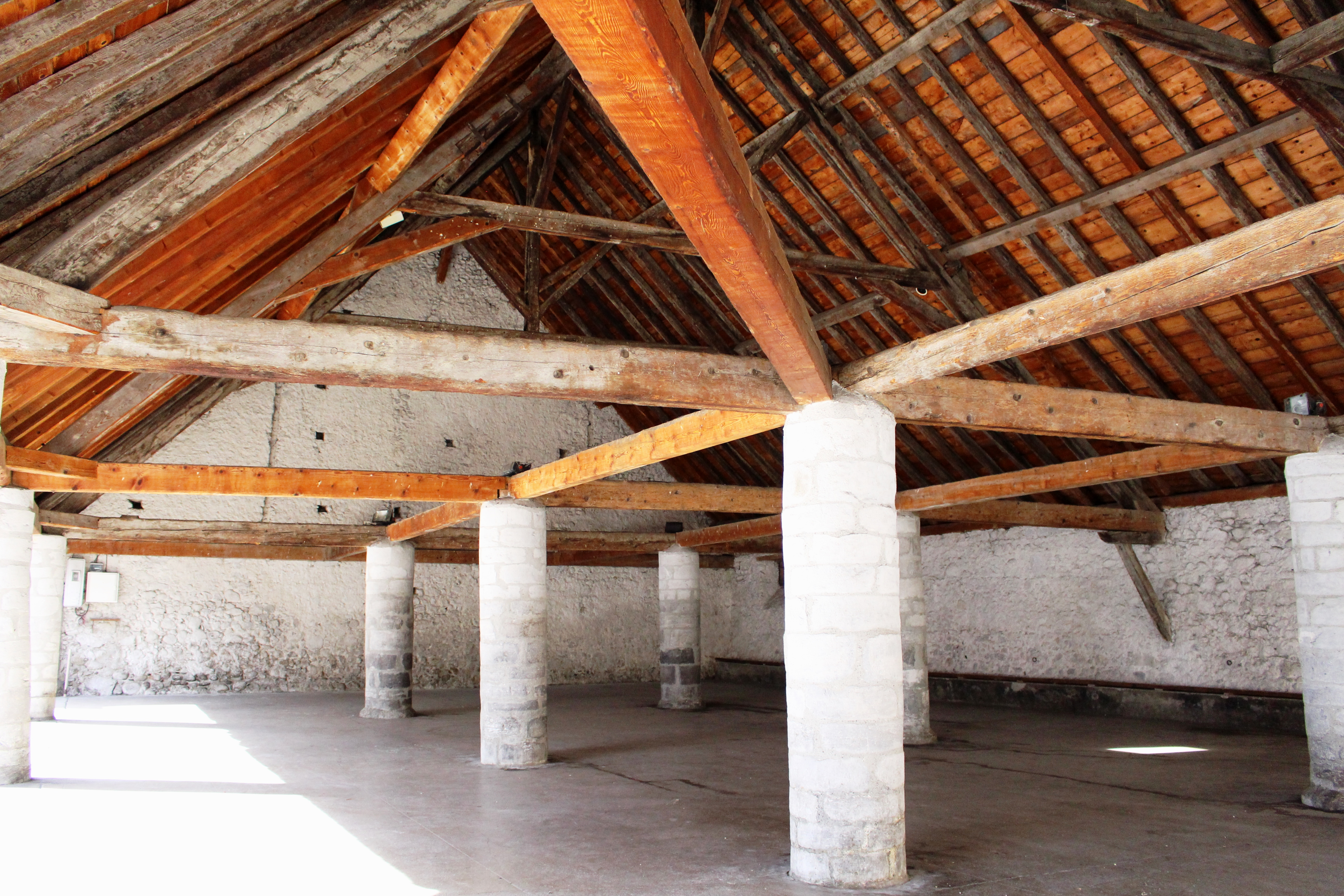
The interior of Halle de Campan.

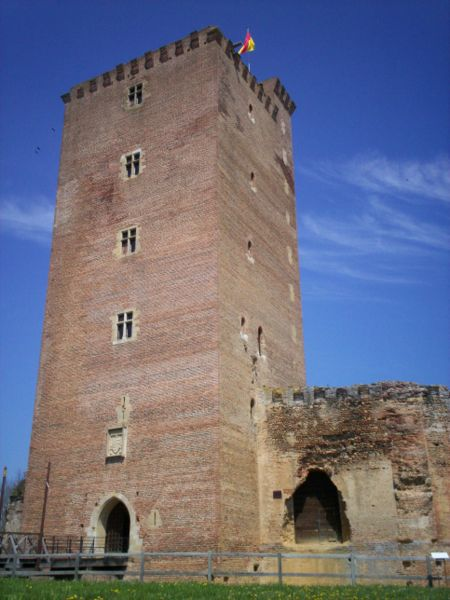
Château de Montaner, built by the Cagots, for Gaston III, Count of Foix.

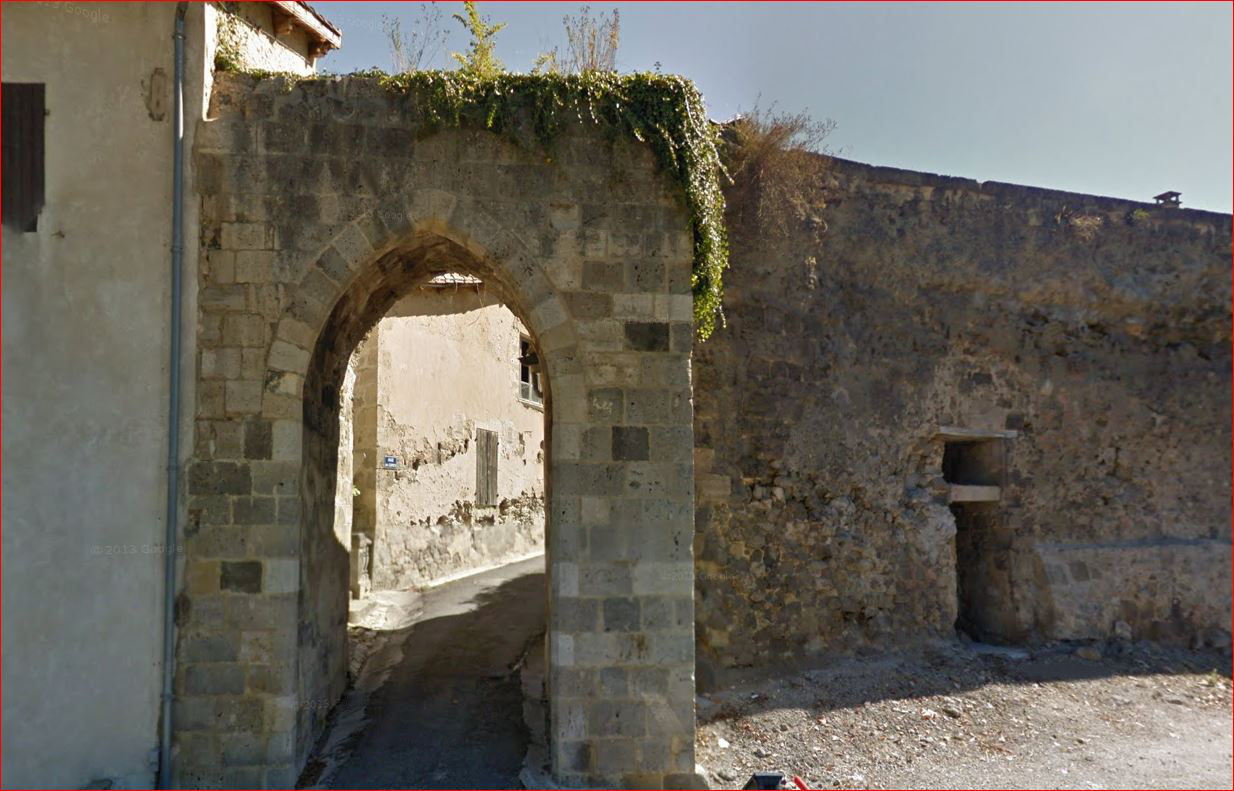
The rue des capots, and the "porte anglaise" in Mézin, Lot-et-Garonne. The rue des capots was formerly inhabited by the Capots (Cagots) of the town.

=== Fonts ===
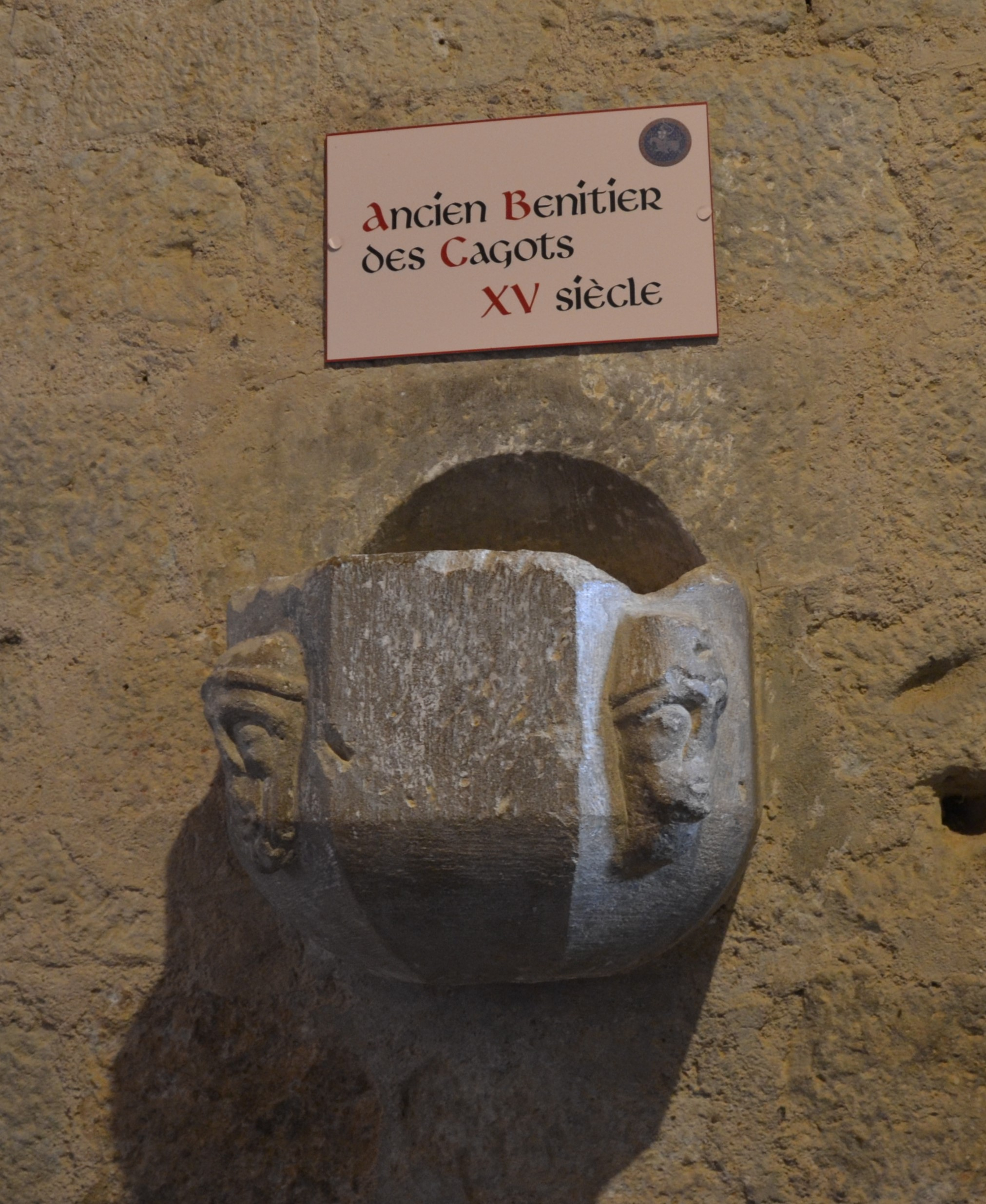
Font for Cagots in the church of Bassoues, dating from the 15th century.

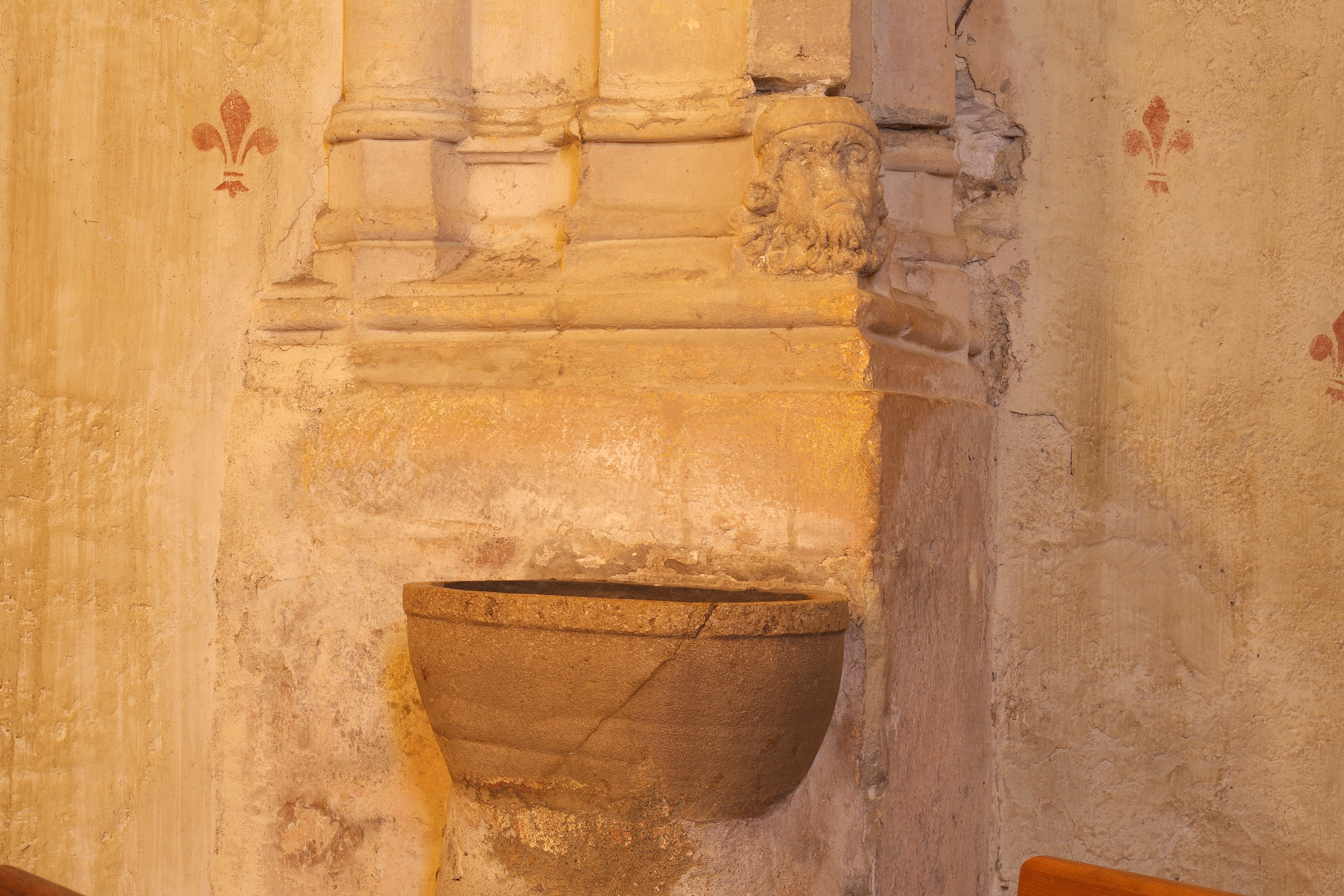
Font for Cagots in the Église Saint-Girons in Monein, with a small sculpture of what is presumed to be a Cagot.

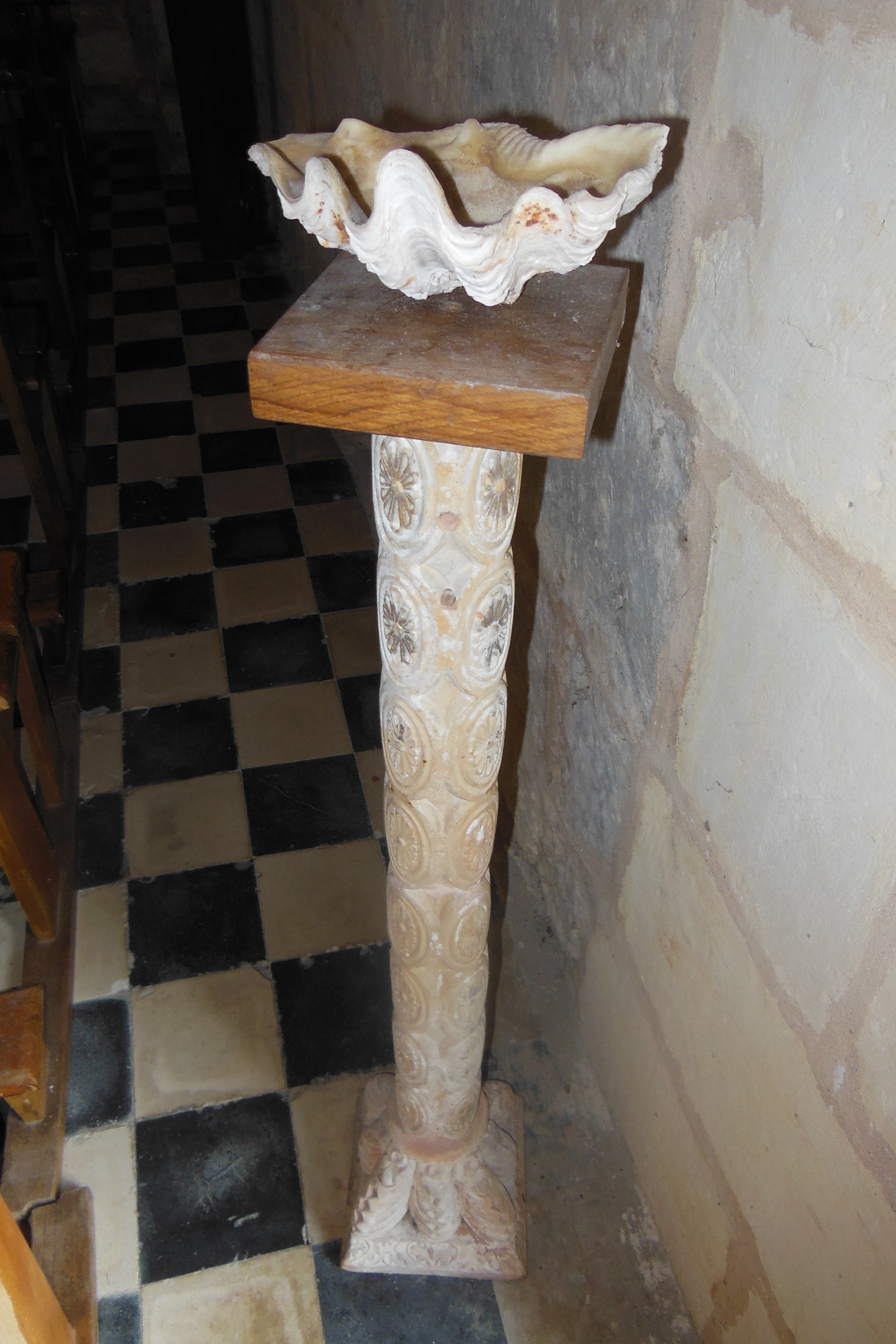
Font for Cagots in the Church of Saint-Aubin in Saint-Aubin, Landes.

=== Doors ===
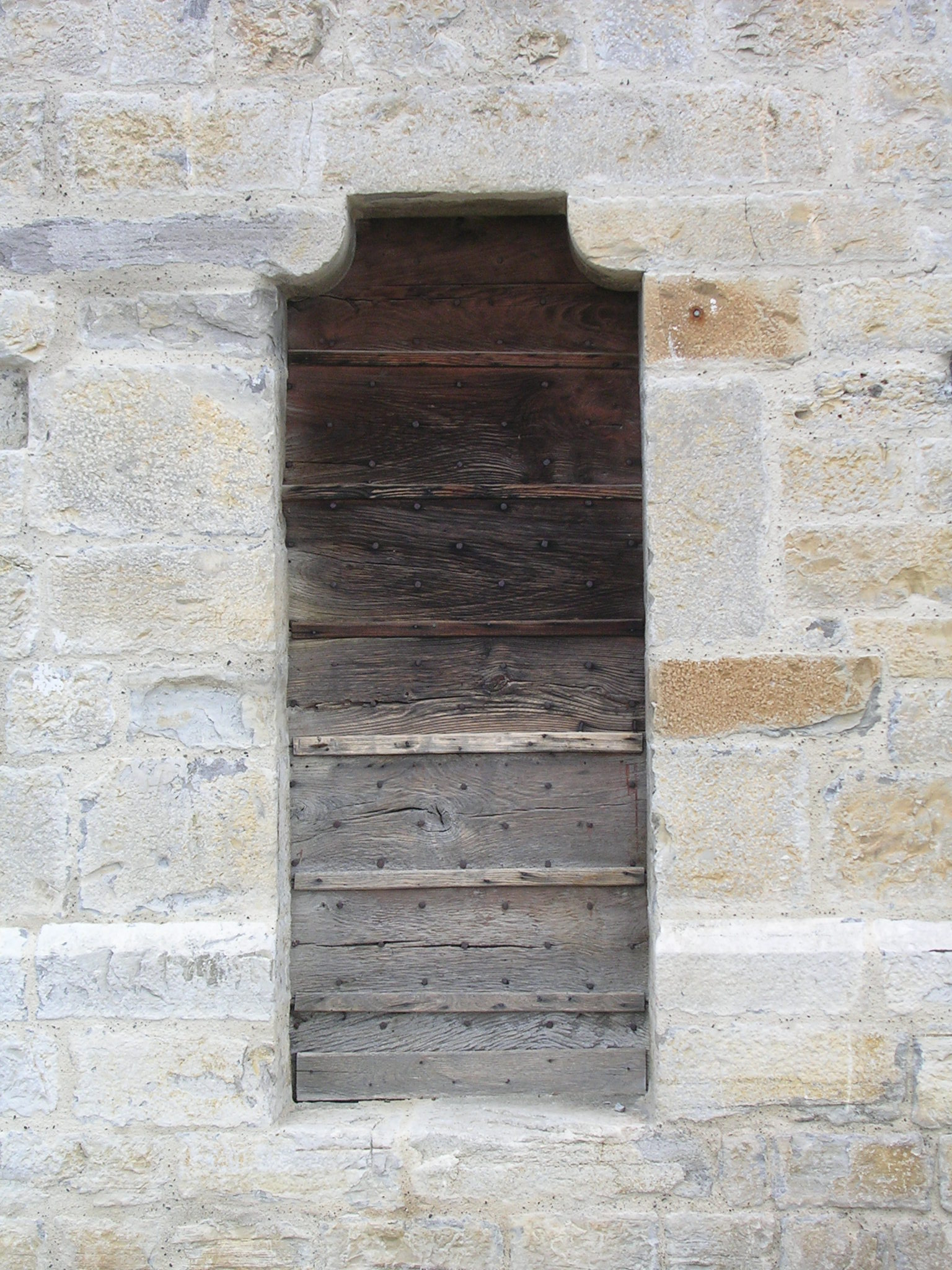
Door of the Cagots of the church of Sauveterre-de-Béarn.

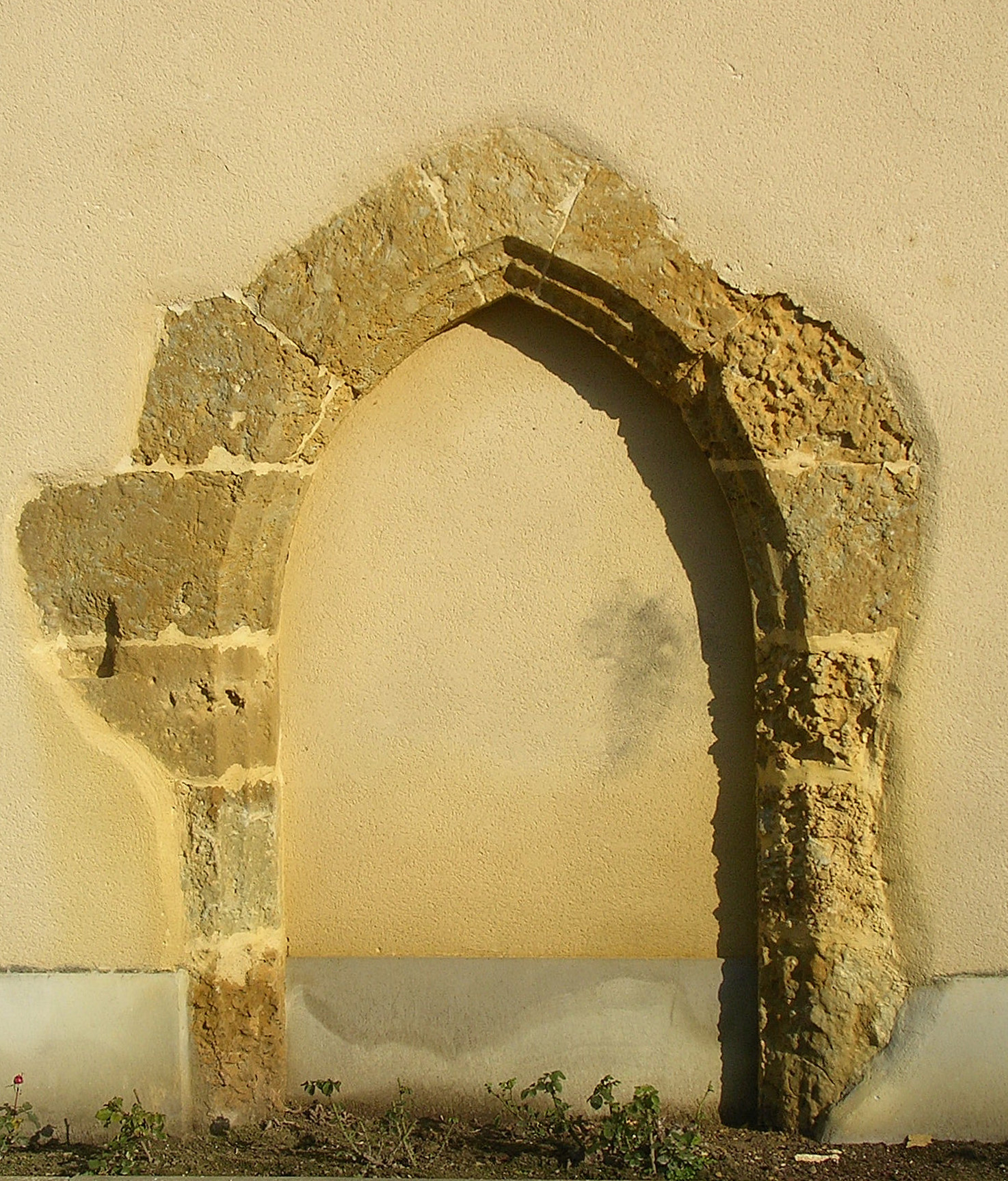
Former door for Cagots in Bahus-Soubiran at the Church of Saint-Jean-Baptiste.

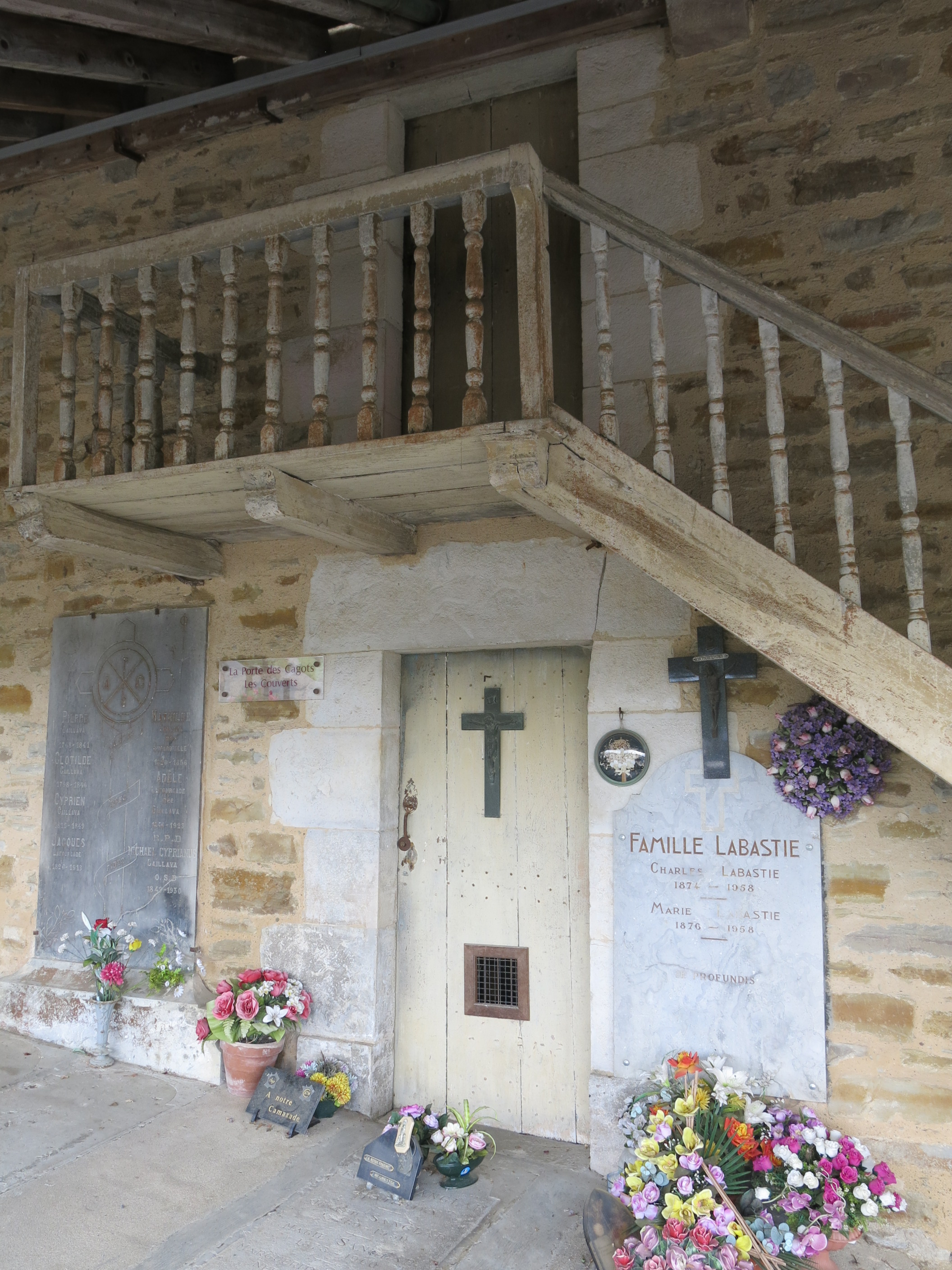
Door of the Cagots in La Bastide-Clairence at the Church of Notre-Dame-de-l'Assomption.

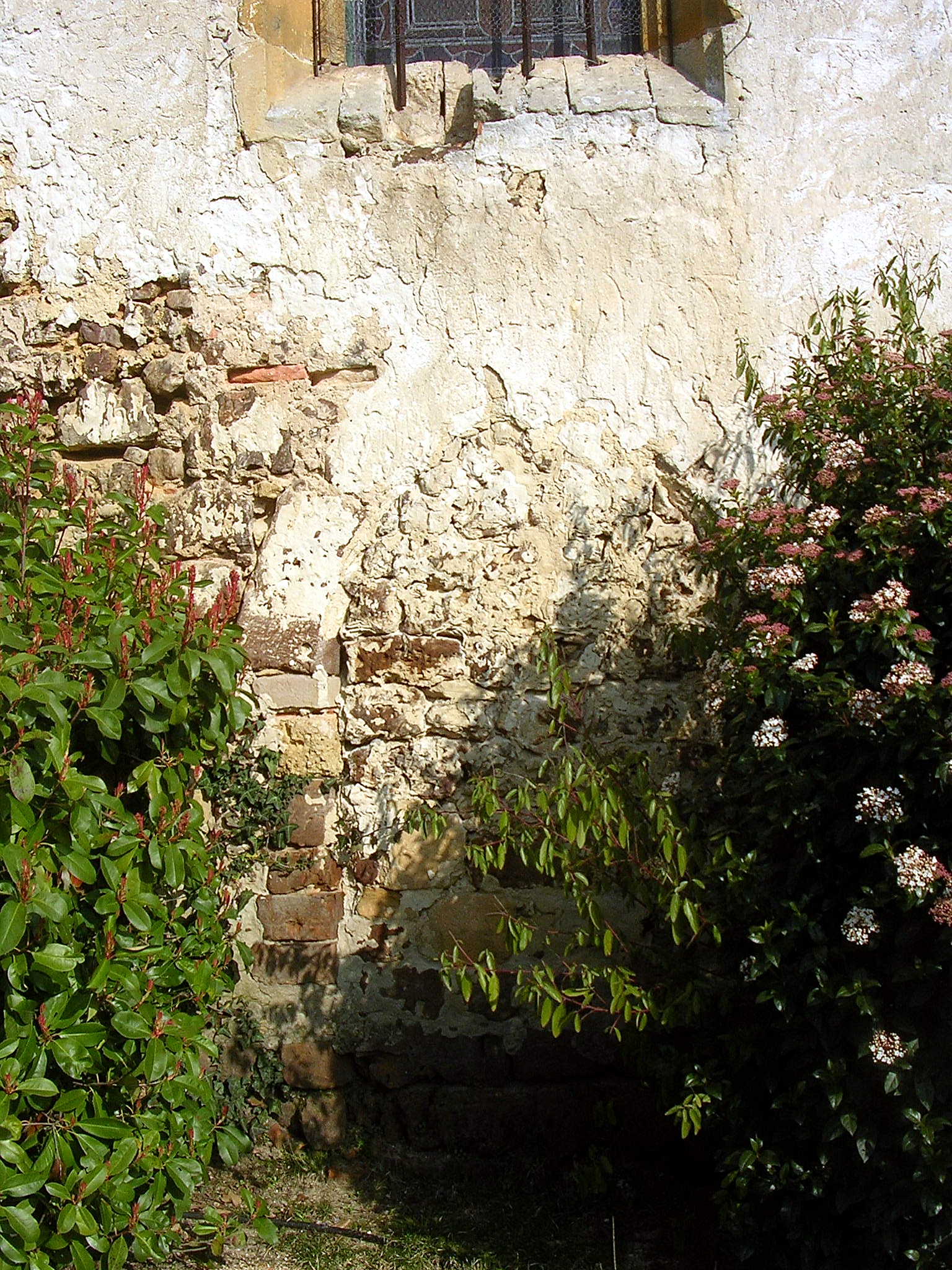
Former door for Cagots in the Church of Saint-Martin de Moustey in Moustey.

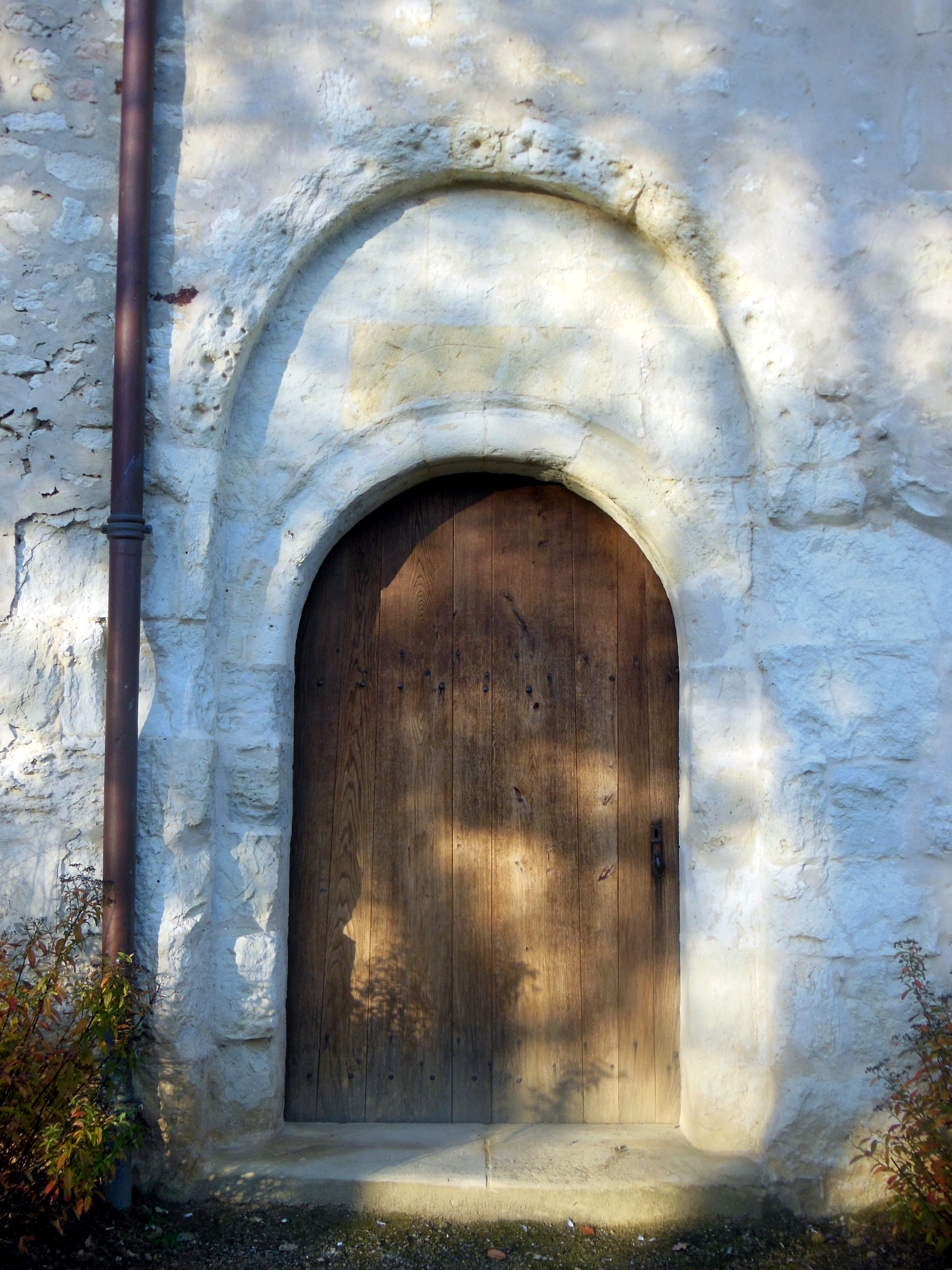
Door for Cagots in the Church of Saint-Aubin in Saint-Aubin, Landes.

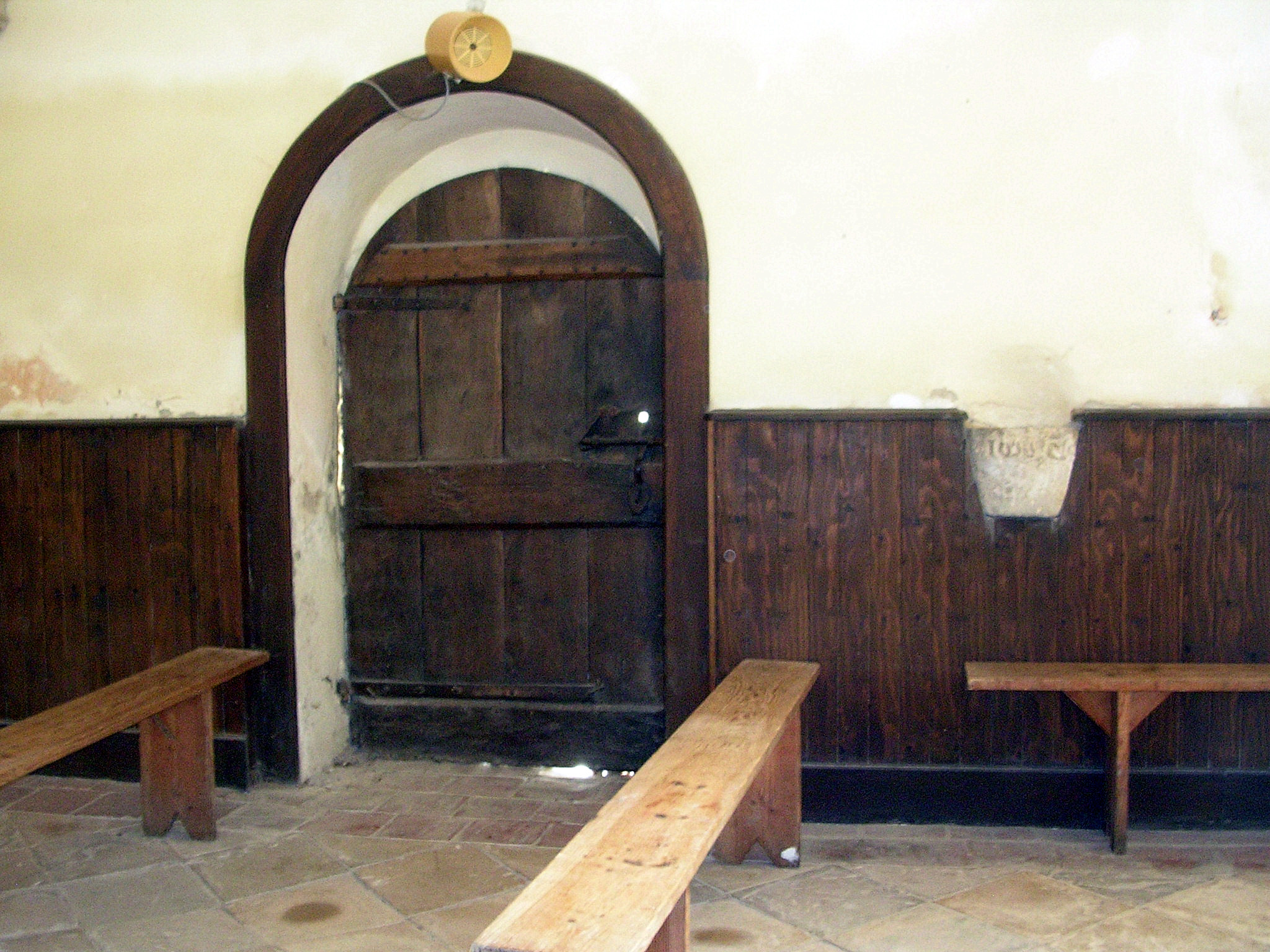
Door for Cagots in the Église Saint-Leu de Duhort in Duhort-Bachen.

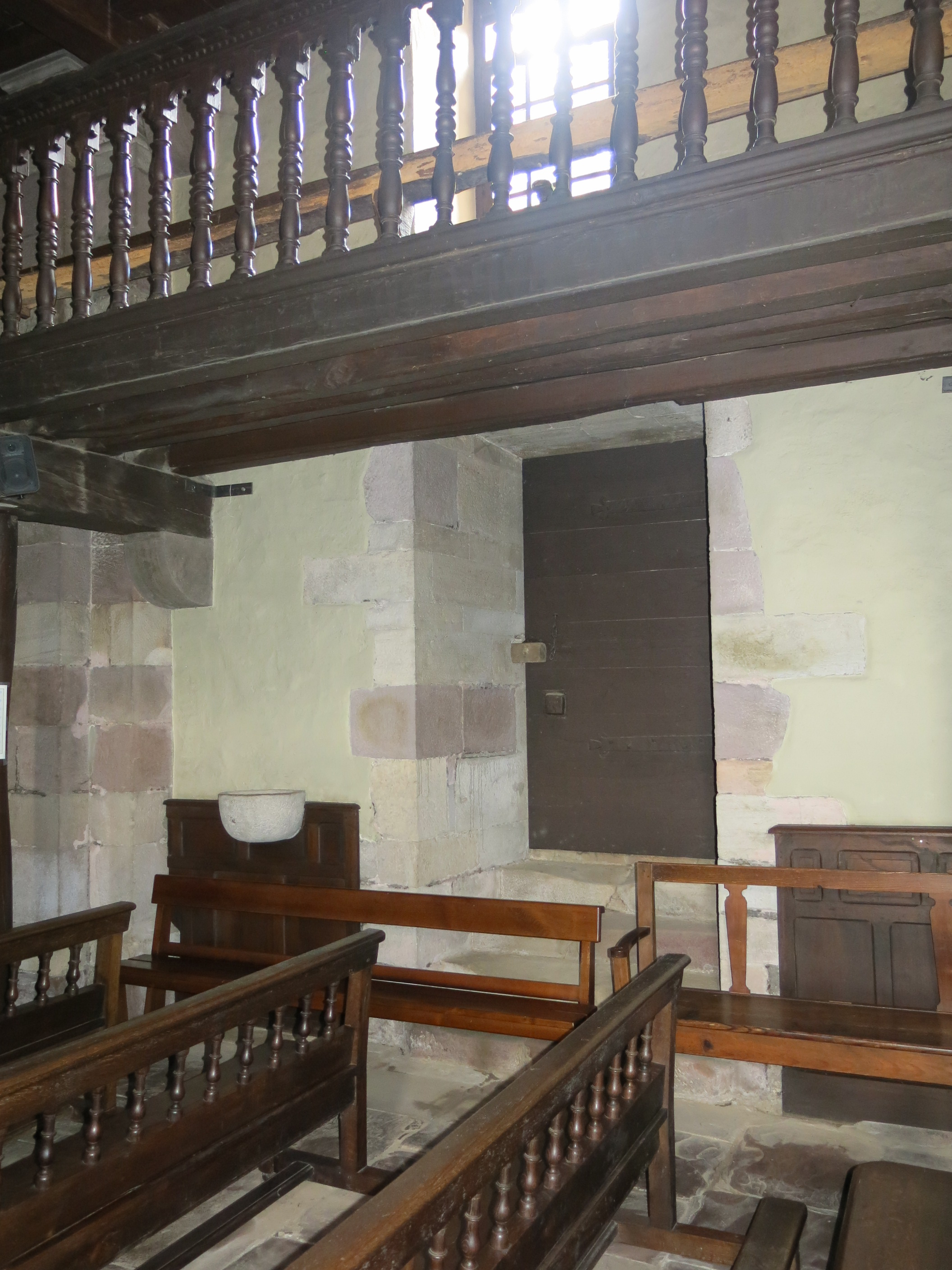
Door for Cagots in the Église Saint-Étienne de Baïgorry in Saint-Étienne-de-Baïgorry.

== See also ==
- Bertrand Dufresne, a Cagot who became Director of the Treasury of France
- Cascarots, an ethnic group in the Spanish Basque country and the French Basque coast possibly related to the Cagots.
- Caquins of Brittany – Underclass in Brittany
- Romani people, an ethnic minority in Spain and Portugal.
- Maragato, an ethnic group in Spain who were also discriminated against and have unknown origins.
- Sanka (ethnic group), an ethnic minority in Japan
- Vaqueiros de alzada, a discriminated group of cowherders in Northern Spain.
- Xueta, a persecuted ethnic minority in Mallorca, often referenced in works discussing the persecution of Cagots in Spain.
