= Bahus-Soubiran =

- Commune
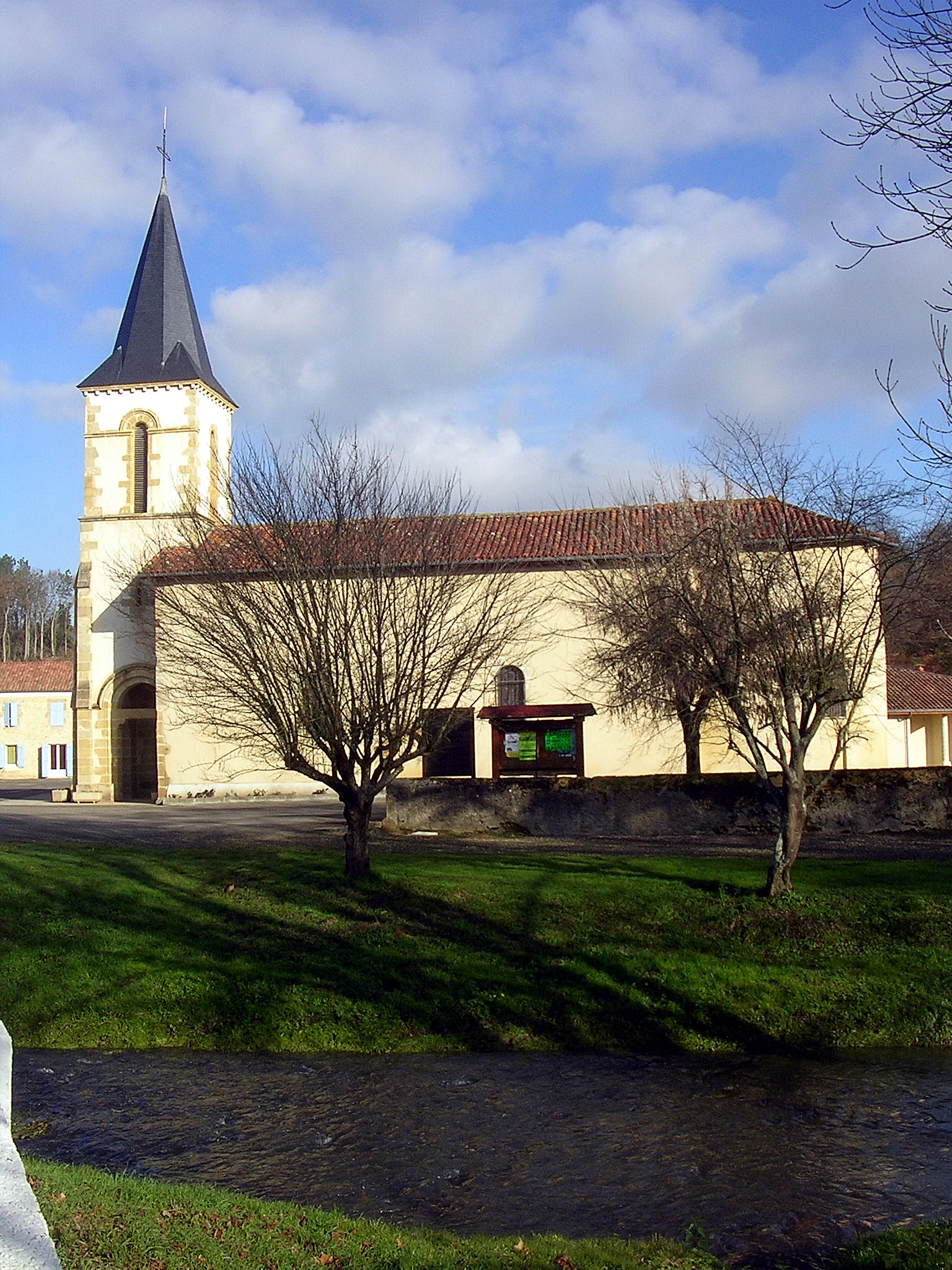
- The church of Bahus-Soubirhan
- Location of Bahus-Soubiran
- Location within France Location within Nouvelle-Aquitaine
- Coordinates: 43°40′29″N 0°21′18″W
- Country: France
- Region: Nouvelle-Aquitaine
- Department: Landes
- Arrondissement: Mont-de-Marsan
- Canton: Adour Armagnac
- Intercommunality: Aire-sur-l'Adour

Government
  - Mayor (2020–2026): Thierry Boulin
- Area^{1}: 14.53 km^{2} (5.61 sq mi)
- Elevation: 113 m (371 ft)
- Highest elevation: 169 m (554 ft)
- Lowest elevation: 100 m (330 ft)
- Population (2023): 394
  - Density: 27.1/km^{2} (70.2/sq mi)
- Time zone: UTC+01:00 (CET)
  - Summer (DST): UTC+02:00 (CEST)
- INSEE/Postal code: 40022 /40320
- ^{1} French Land Register data, which excludes lakes, ponds, glaciers > 1 km^{2} (0.386 sq mi or 247 acres) and river estuaries.

Bahus-Soubiran (French pronunciation: [bays subiʁɑ̃]; Gascon: Baús Sobiran) is a commune in the Landes department in Nouvelle-Aquitaine in southwestern France.

== Geography ==
Bahus-Soubiran is located in the heart of the Landes region, about 30 kilometers northeast of Mont-de-Marsan, the department's capital. The commune is part of the Aire-sur-l'Adour intercommunal community. Its gently undulating terrain varies in elevation from 100 to 169 meters above sea level, with the village itself situated at approximately 113 meters.

The commune is primarily rural, characterized by fields, vineyards, and small wooded areas. The Adour River and its tributaries influence the local landscape and agriculture, providing fertile soils for viticulture and farming.

== History ==
The history of Bahus-Soubiran is closely tied to its religious and rural heritage. The church of Saint-Jean-Baptiste, dating from the 13th century, is one of the commune's most notable landmarks. Historically, it was a place of refuge for the marginalized Cagot community, evidenced by the distinctive "Cagot door," a feature still visible today.

The region also has a long-standing tradition of agriculture and viticulture, with its economy historically relying on these activities.

== Economy ==
Bahus-Soubiran's economy remains centered on agriculture, particularly the cultivation of cereals, sunflowers, and vines. Local vineyards are part of the Armagnac wine region, contributing to the production of this famous French brandy. Small-scale livestock farming also plays a role in the local economy.

In recent years, there has been a growing focus on rural tourism.

== Population ==
Historical population
| Year | Pop. | ±% p.a. |
|---|---|---|
| 1968 | 388 | — |
| 1975 | 365 | −0.87% |
| 1982 | 327 | −1.56% |
| 1990 | 326 | −0.04% |
| 1999 | 303 | −0.81% |
| 2007 | 352 | +1.89% |
| 2012 | 390 | +2.07% |
| 2017 | 409 | +0.96% |
| 2023 | 394 | −0.62% |
Source: INSEE

The population of Bahus-Soubiran has fluctuated over the decades, with notable declines during the first half of the 20th century due to rural depopulation. However, the commune has seen a modest rebound since 2000.

== Landmarks ==
- Church of Saint-Jean-Baptiste: A historic church dating back to the 13th century, featuring unique architectural elements like the "Cagot door", which reflects the commune's history of social exclusion.

== See also ==
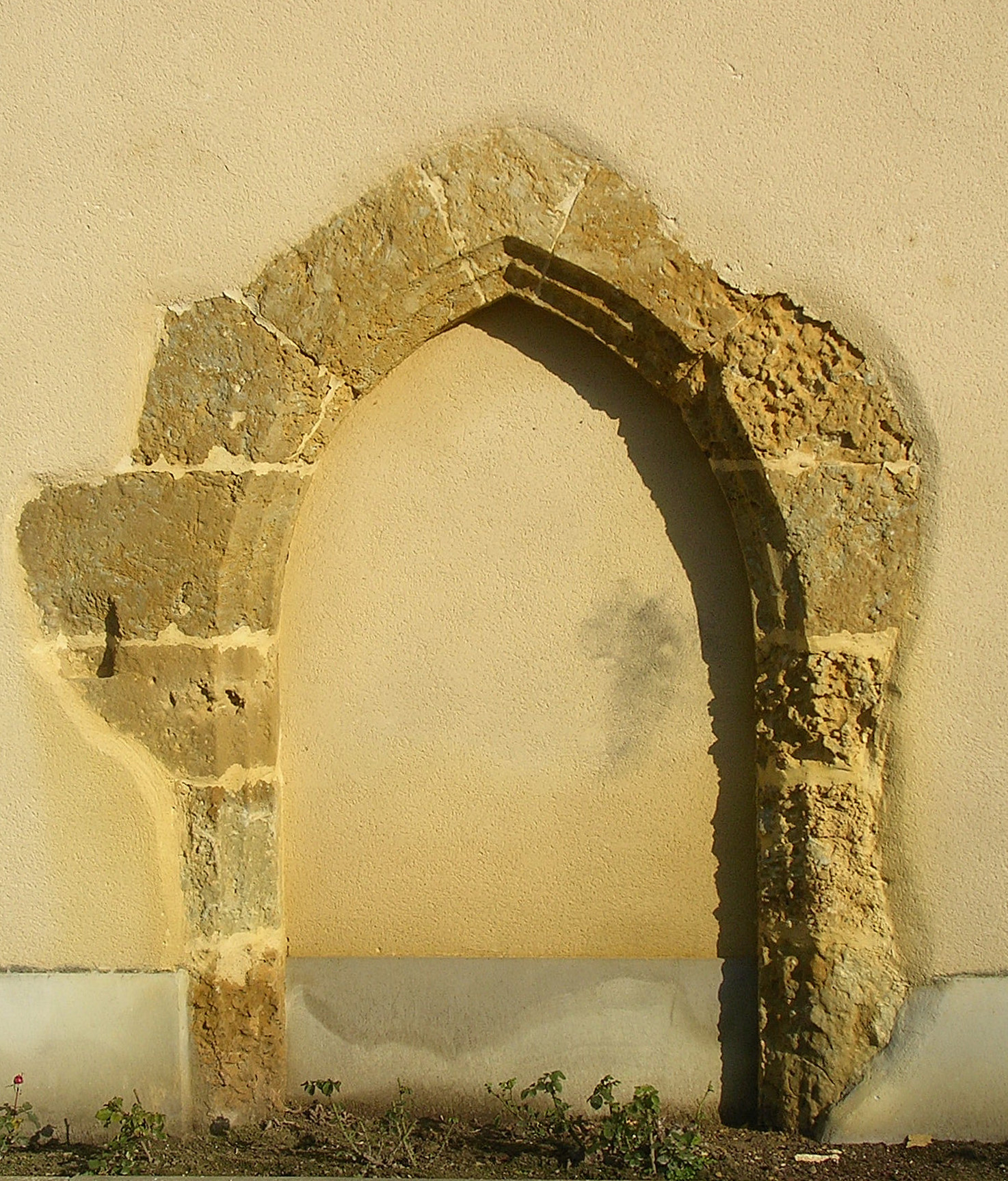
Former door for Cagots in Bahus-Soubiran at the church of Saint-Jean-Baptiste.

- Communes of the Landes department
