= Caquins of Brittany =

Underclass in Brittany

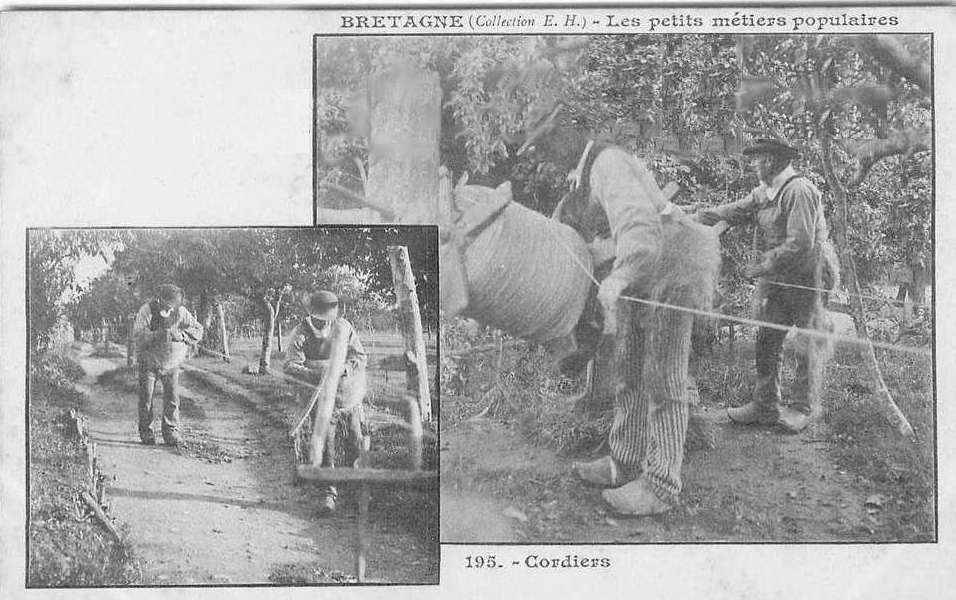
Breton ropemakers in 1905

The Caquins of Brittany, (also Cacous (Note: Possibly from the Breton word Cacodd meaning leprous) Kakouz, Caqueux, Caquets, and Caquous) were groups of inhabitants who worked as coopers and ropemakers, subjected to exclusion in their villages located in Brittany, between the thirteenth century and modern times.

== History ==
The first records of the caquins occur in the statues of Raoul Rolland, Bishop of Tréguier, where they are referred to as "cacosi". A document from 1444 then refers to them as "cacoust", and ducal mandate from 1475 introduces the term "caqueux".

== Legal restrictions ==
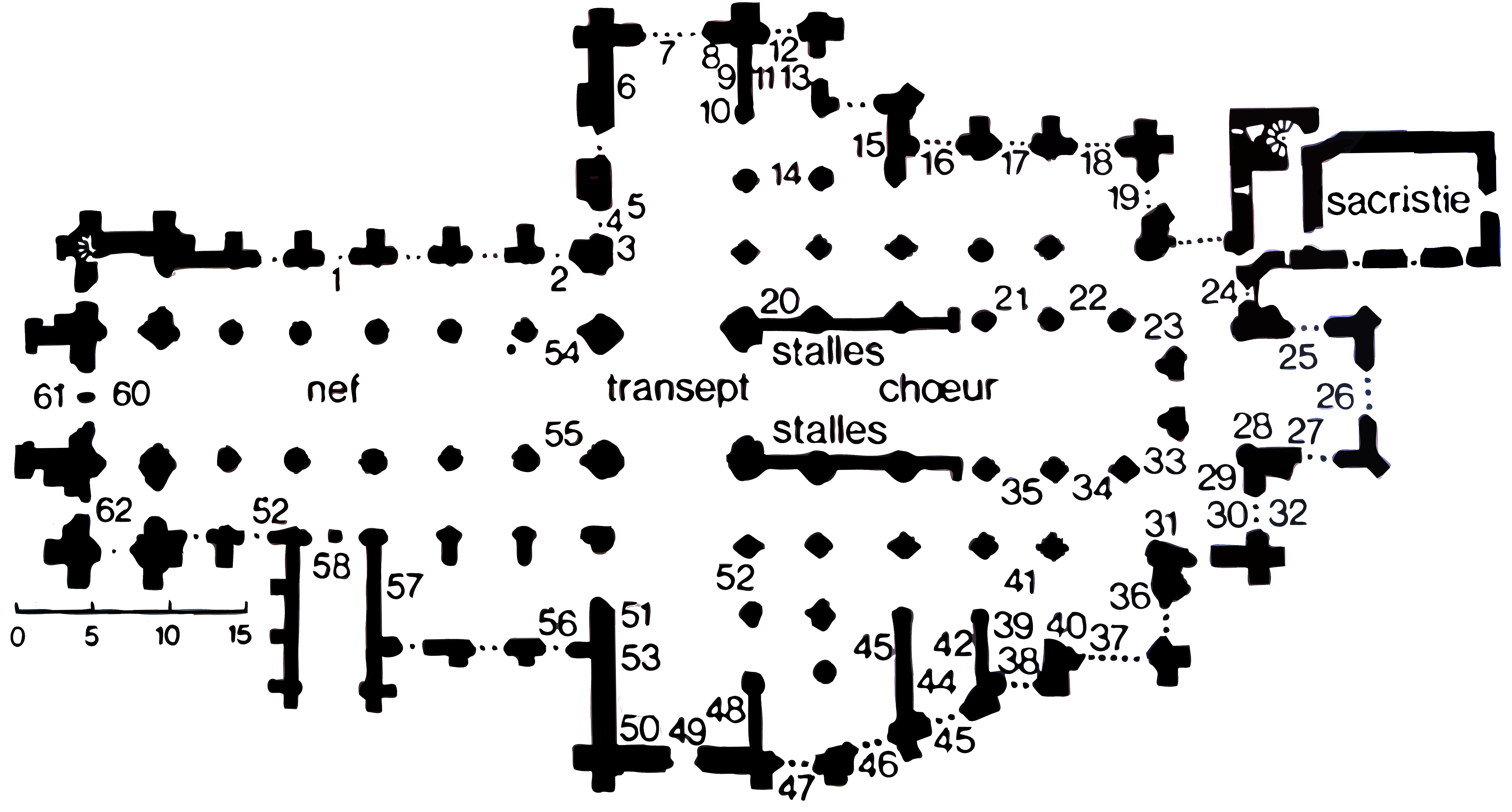
Plan of Saint-Pol-de-Léon Cathedral, identifying a door reserved for use by the Caquins at No. 62.

The Caquins were subjected to a variety of laws restricting their actions in society, this included restricting what work they could undertake, and while they could own land they were prohibited from building.

On 12 February 1425, John V, Duke of Brittany in his constitutions forbade the Caquins to engage in trade and demanded their separation from others. However, on 16 April 1447, the duke allowed the Caquins to take leased land in the bishopric of Vannes, as well as elsewhere.

In 1456, mandates from Peter II, Duke of Brittany re-affirmed the separation of "caqueux [caquins], malornez, and ladres" from other people. On 18 December 1456, Peter II issued a long ordinance on fouages (the tax paid by each feu), where he declared that the Caquins were exempted from this tax.

There were also various religious restrictions imposed on the Caquins, such as having to enter churches through special doors separate from other congregants.

== Discrimination ==
It is believed that the exclusion of the Caquins was based on the fear of leprosy, where Caquin ropemakers were believed to be descendants of lepers and could spread leprosy. This potential leprous origin as well as their treatment, until the eighteenth century, mean they are often compared to the Cagots of southwestern France and northern Spain, (Note: When talking of the Cagots, Breton commentators would call them by the same name they would use for the Caquins.) or the crétins des Alpes of the Swiss Alps, there is however no mention of physical or mental particularities specific to the Caquins.

In parish records of births, they were listed at the end, upside-down with illegitimate children. In Pluvigner in the late 1600s, a funeral cortege for a caquin was attacked by over 200 people for attempting to bury the caquin in the parish churchyard instead of the designated caquin churchyard. Many of the discriminatory beliefs around the caquins were the same as those believed of Jews elsewhere in Europe, such as bleeding from the navel around Good Friday.
