= Cascarots =

Ethnic group in the French Basque Country

The Cascarots (Basque: Kaskarotuak) are a Romani-like ethnic group from Spain who settled in parts of the Basque Country after the end of the fifteenth century.

== History ==
The Cascarots are recorded from the fifteenth century in Spain and France, around the Basque country. They are believed to be the descendants of marriages between Basques and Romani people.

Historic documents mention the Cascarots living in ghettos, for example in Ciboure and occasionally entire villages such as the village of Ispoure.

In 1800 the population of Ciboure was 1,459 people and the community of Cascarots 50 families (300 to 500 people). Later, after their assimilation, many writings indicate that it is no longer possible to determine in the population a physical particularity showing a different origin from the Basque people. In the 16th and 17th centuries, they first accepted in Spain and France to be considered as Bohemians (Gypsies). These are considered Catholics and do not suffer the harassment of the Inquisitions, which is not the case of the Moriscos. According to the Spanish author Manuel Martinez Martinez (gitanos y moriscos), the Moriscos dressed like Romani people to protect themselves. Letters seized by the Inquisition show that this community established in Saint-Jean-de-Luz corresponded with its friends or relatives who remained in Spain. During the 17th and 18th centuries, these Moriscos integrated into the local Basque and Gascon population.

== Name ==
In some sources the name for the Cascarots is recorded as Carraques.

== Culture ==
The Cascarots are traditionally known as good dancers, with the Kaskarotak March being a particular dance seen in the Pyrenean valleys.

== See also ==
- Romani people by country
- Agote, a minority that may be related to Cascarots
