= Onde =

Onde means wave in French and the same (ಒಂದೇ) in Kannada language. It may refer to

- Onde, Vikramgad, a village in India
- Onde Balliya Hoogalu, a 1967 Indian Kannada film
- Onde Roopa Eradu Guna, a 1975 Indian Kannada film
- Onde Guri, a 1983 Indian Kannada film
- Le Onde, a 1996 album by the Italian pianist Ludovico Einaudi
- Mille Lune Mille Onde, a single from Andrea Bocelli's 2001 album Cieli di Toscana
- Onde (film), a 2005 Italian film
- Onde 2000, a motorcycle racing team based in Spain

== See also ==
- Ondes (disambiguation)
- Onde-onde (disambiguation)
