= Ziga, Navarre =

Ziga
- village
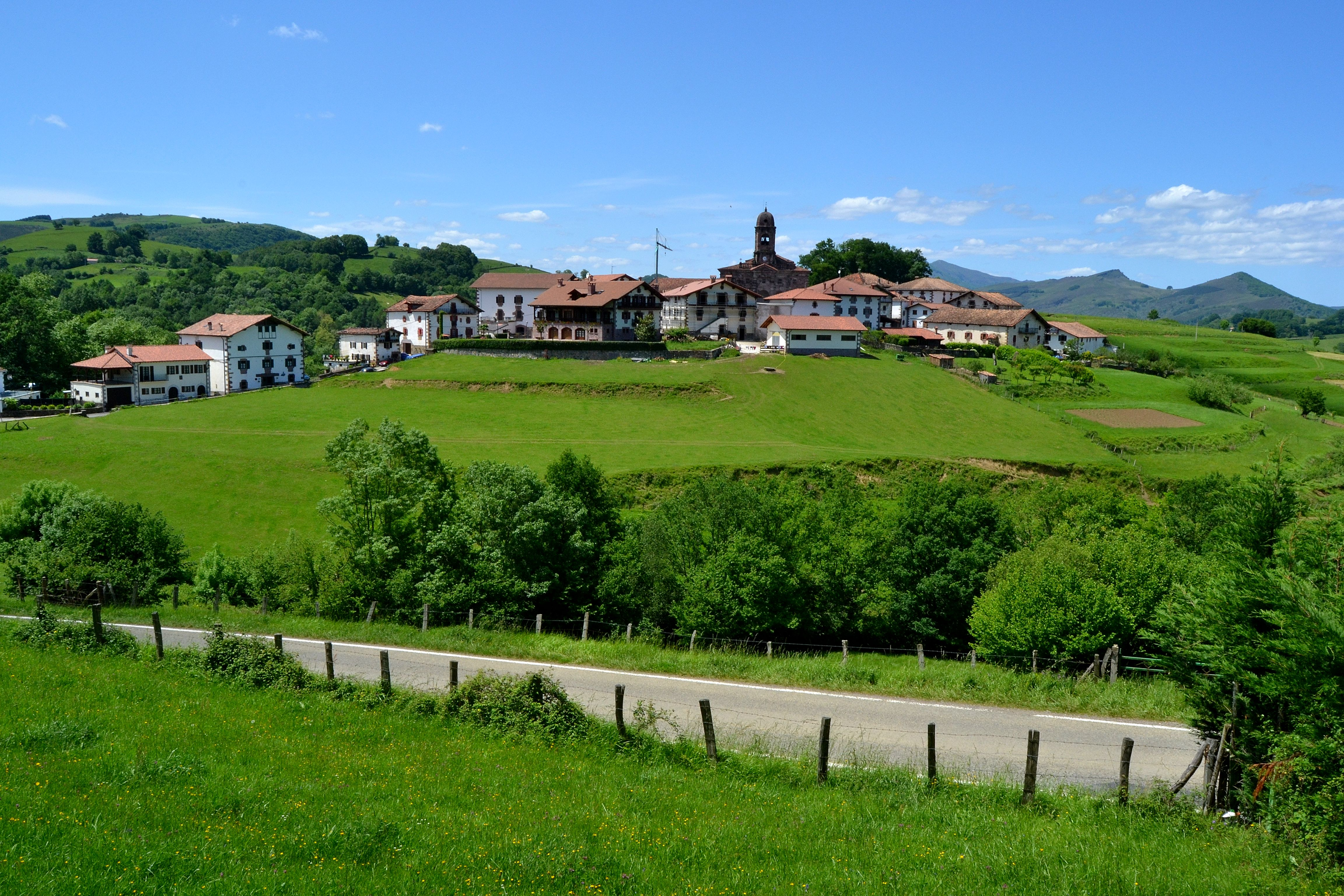

- Location in Navarre Location in Spain
- Coordinates: 43°07′11″N 1°34′18″W
- Country: Spain
- Community: Navarre
- Province: Navarre
- Special division: Baztan
- Municipality: Baztan

Population (2010)
  - Total: 196

Ziga is a village located in the municipality of Baztan, Navarre, Spain. It has a population of 196 as of 2010.
