= Hydrographic Confederation of the Bay of Biscay =

Confederación Hidrográfica del Cantábrico
- Confederación Hidrográfica del Cantábrico

Hydrographic confederation overview
- Formed: 22 February 2008
- Headquarters: Oviedo, Spain
- Parent department: Ministry of Agriculture
- Website: http://www.chcantabrico.es/index.php/es/

The Hydrographic Confederation of the Bay of Biscay is a river basin organization created by Royal Decree 266/2008, which divided the Northern Hydrographic Confederation into the Miño-Sil and Bay of Biscay Hydrographic Confederations.

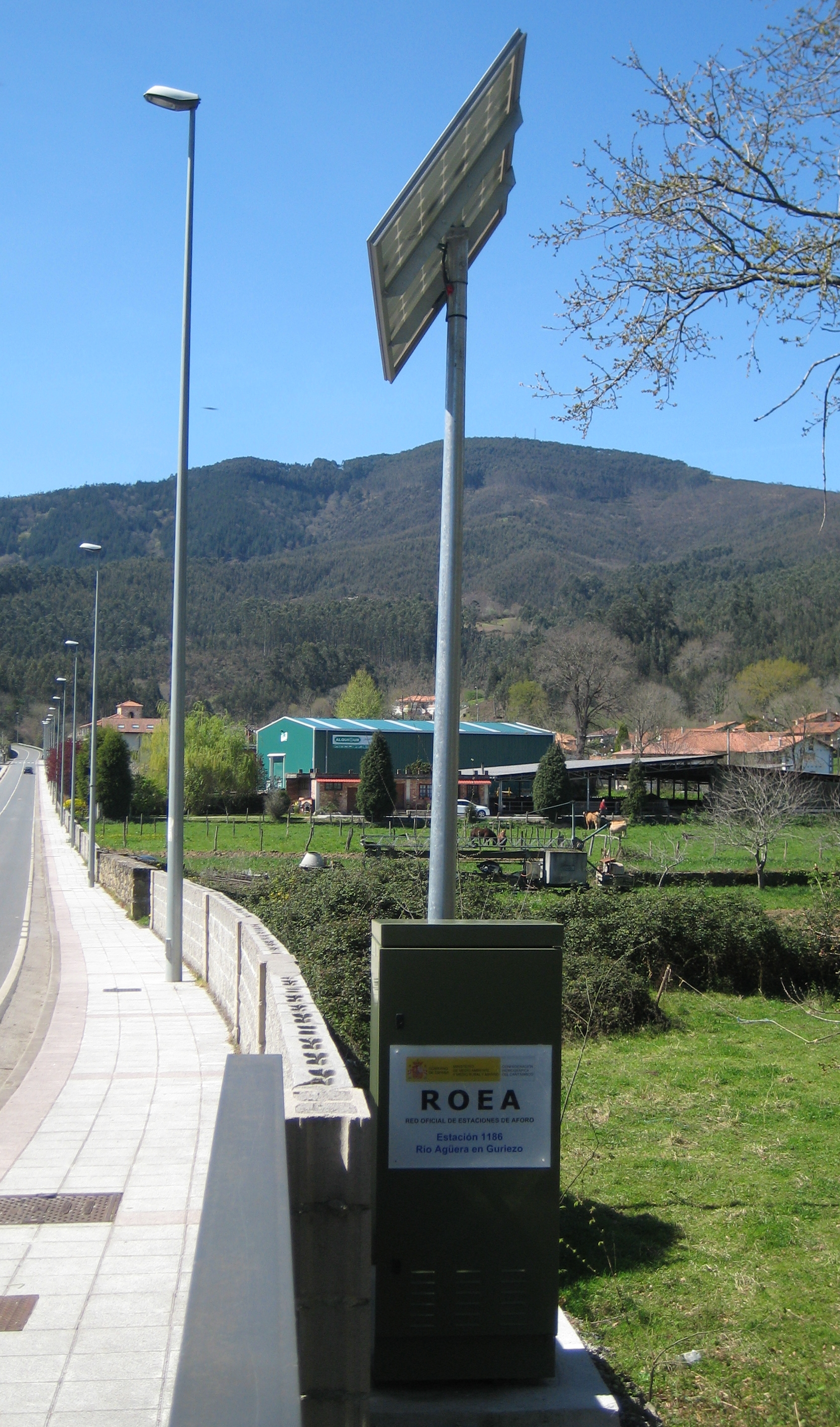
Estación de aforo junto al río Agüera.

The Consolidated Text of the Water Law (approved by Royal Legislative Decree 1/2001 of July 20, 2001) defines it as a public law entity with its own legal personality and distinct from the State, attached for administrative purposes to the Ministry of Ecological Transition and Demographic Challenge through the Directorate General of Water, belonging to the Secretary of State for the Environment, as an autonomous body with full functional autonomy.

It plays an important role in its hydrographic demarcation, since, among other functions, it is in charge of hydrological planning, management of resources and uses, protection of the public water domain, concessions of private water use rights, water quality control, design and execution of new hydraulic infrastructures, dam safety programs, and data banks.

== Hydrographic demarcation ==
=== Hydrographic demarcation of the Bay of Biscay ===
Its hydrographic demarcation, according to Royal Decree 125/2007, included the territory of the catchment basins of the rivers flowing into the Cantabrian Sea, from the mouth of the Eo river, including that of this river, to the border with France, together with its transitional waters, excluding the territory of the sub-basins on the left bank of the Eo estuary and excluding the territory and associated transitional waters of the internal basins of the Basque Country. It also included the Spanish territory of the Nive and Nivelle river basins. The coastal waters have as western boundary the line with 0º orientation passing through Punta de Peñas Blancas, west of the Eo estuary, and as eastern boundary the line with 2nd orientation passing through Punta del Covarón, on the boundary between the autonomous communities of Cantabria and the Basque Country."

Its hydrographic demarcation comprises, from west to east, the riverbeds of the Eo, Porcia, Navia, Esva, Narcea, Nalón, Sella, Deva, Nansa, Saja, Besaya, Pas, Miera, Asón, Agüera, Nervión, Oria, Urumea and Bidasoa, covering a total surface area of 20. 831 km² spread over a total of 10 provinces, corresponding to six autonomous communities: almost all of Asturias, a large part of Cantabria and small extensions of Galicia, Castile and León, Basque Country and Navarre. In total, the demarcation affects more than two million inhabitants, a large part of which belong to Asturias and Cantabria.
