= José Álvarez Fernández =

Spanish missionary in Peru

Servant of God José Álvarez Fernández OP
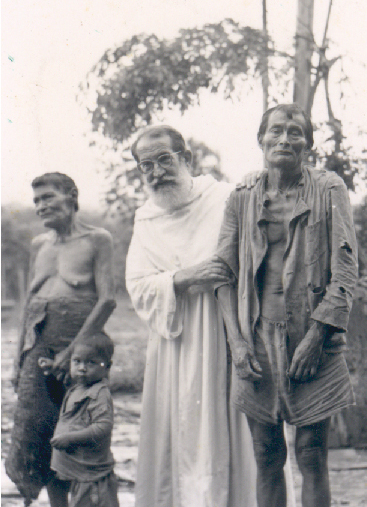
- Padre José Álvarez Fernández with Peruvian natives.
- Born: 16 May 1890; Cuevas, Belmonte de Miranda, Asturias, Spain
- Died: 19 October 1970 (aged 80); Lima, Peru

José Álvarez Fernández, OP (16 May 1890 – 19 October 1970), better known as "Padre Apaktone", was a Spanish Dominican friar and missionary in the Department of Madre de Dios of the Peruvian Amazonia. He was working as a health care support, evangelizer, mediator and educator to the various Indigenous peoples of Peru for 53 years.

== Biography ==
Álvarez was born on 16 May 1890 in Cuevas in Belmonte de Miranda, Asturias.

He was ordained as priest on 1916 at the age of 26 and a year after he travelled to Peru to start his missionary work with the approval of the Dominican Province in Spain. Together with other religious missionaries, he began his mission on Good Friday of 1917, in the jungle of Madre de Dios region, traveling the following years from river to river to meet people abused and exploited by rubber tappers and industries. During his missionary works, he came into contact with countless tribes, some very violent, with whose chiefs he established friendship, but sometimes he suffers threats and unforeseen attacks. Because of his great evangelizing talent and aptitude in learning the native's languages, he brought peace and dialogue and became a mediator between ethnic communities, eventually gaining their support and respects.

Álvarez also made hundreds of expeditions through the Madre de Dios River basin and jungles. Due to his discovery of hidden places along the region and recording the native inhabitants culture, he became a member of the Geographical Society of Lima. In the 1960s, the Amarakaeris, one of the Peruvian Amazonia tribes with which Álvarez lived renamed him "Apaktone", which means "big father" or "old father". Since then, all the tribal and local communities in the region started calling him as such.

During his final years, Álvarez dedicated his time studying the original native vocabulary, praying, writing about his expeditions, and arranging the missions he had formed since he arrived in Peru. He died on 19 October 1970, at the age of 80, in Lima, where had to stay in his last years of life to his health problems.

On the day of his death, a small sheet with his autobiography was found in his breviary:

"I received priestly orders in 1916; He arrived in Peru in 1917; My first encounters with the natives were in the state of belligerence, hostility and persecution that the rubber tappers and industrialists had with them since time immemorial; The slightest idea of entering the jungle, home of the tribes, to bring them the Christian message was, if not utopian, then considered extremely risky; I reached them and they were so amazed when they saw me, alone among them, speaking to them in their language, that I achieved what no one had dreamed of: calming hatred and smoothing out thousands of difficulties."

== Beatification ==
On 11 May 2007, the Roman Catholic Archdiocese of Lima received the nihil obstat from the Dicastery for the Causes of Saints, signaling the approval to initiate the beatification proceedings of Fernández, granting him the title "Servant of God".

Crescencio Palomo, the national postulator of his cause, said of him on the closing of diocesan inquiry on his life and holiness:

"He is the great missionary of the Peruvian jungles, to whom all missionaries continue to refer. He arrived in Lima in 1917, began to mission and learned the language of each tribe by word of mouth. He continued to penetrate the jungle to evangelize the natives, he made hundreds of expeditions by canoe and on foot to visit, along all the tributaries of the Madre de Dios, hut by hut, the Manukiaris, Kareneris, Huachipairis, Shineris, Amarakaeris... The name "Apaktone" with which he signed and which appears in his tomb, in the crypt of the Sanctuary of Saint Rose of Lima, also has the meaning of chief, supernatural leader, redeemer, as current members of those tribes."
