= Elbete =

- village
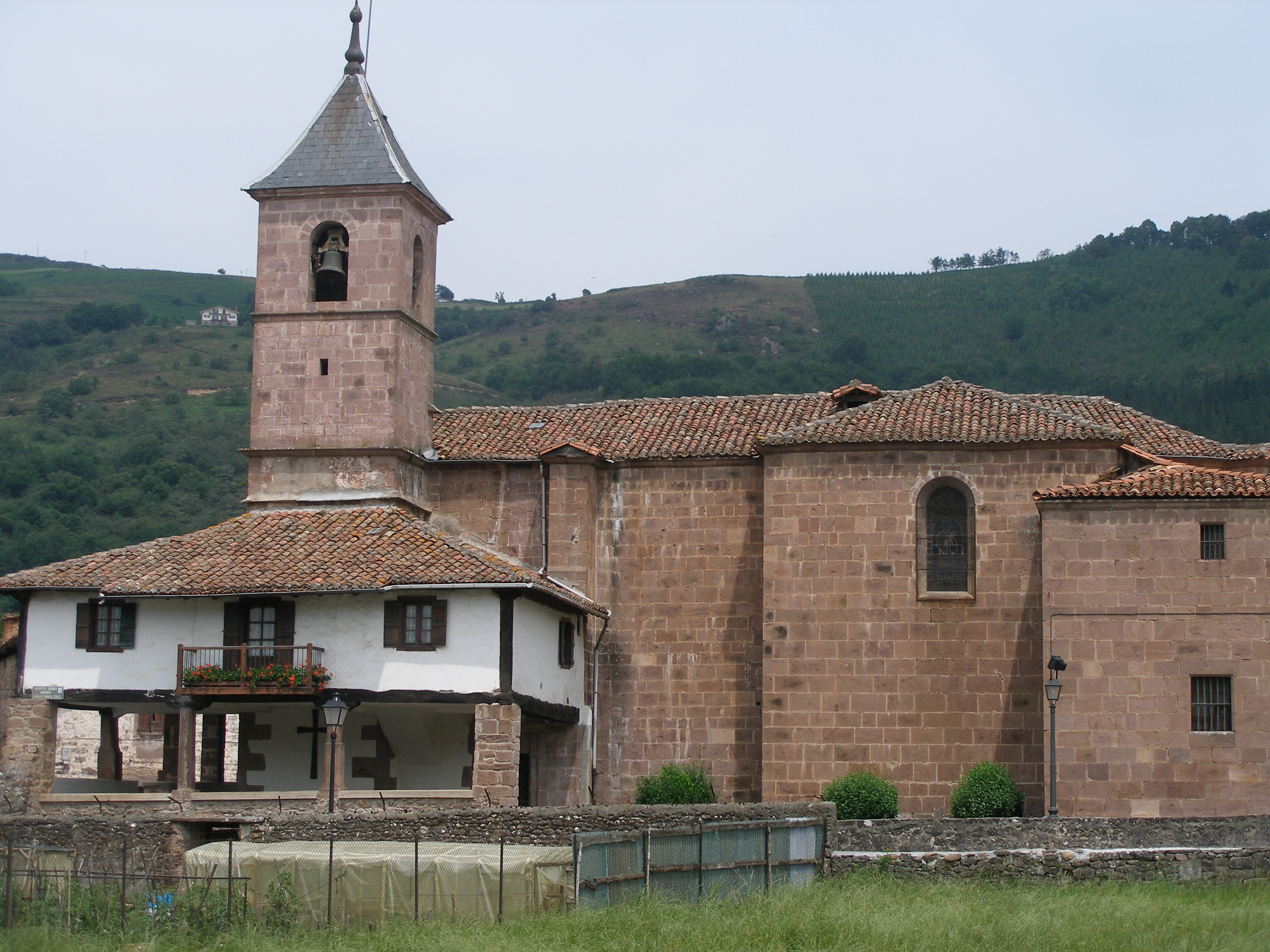
- A church in Elbete

- Location in Navarre Location in Spain
- Coordinates: 43°08′58″N 1°30′47″W
- Country: Spain
- Community: Navarre
- Province: Navarre
- Special division: Baztan
- Municipality: Baztan

Population (2014)
  - Total: 271
- Time zone: UTC+1 (GMT)
  - Summer (DST): UTC+2 (GMT)

Elbete (Spanish: Elvetea) is a village located in the municipality of Baztan, Navarre, Spain.
