= Erratzu =

- village
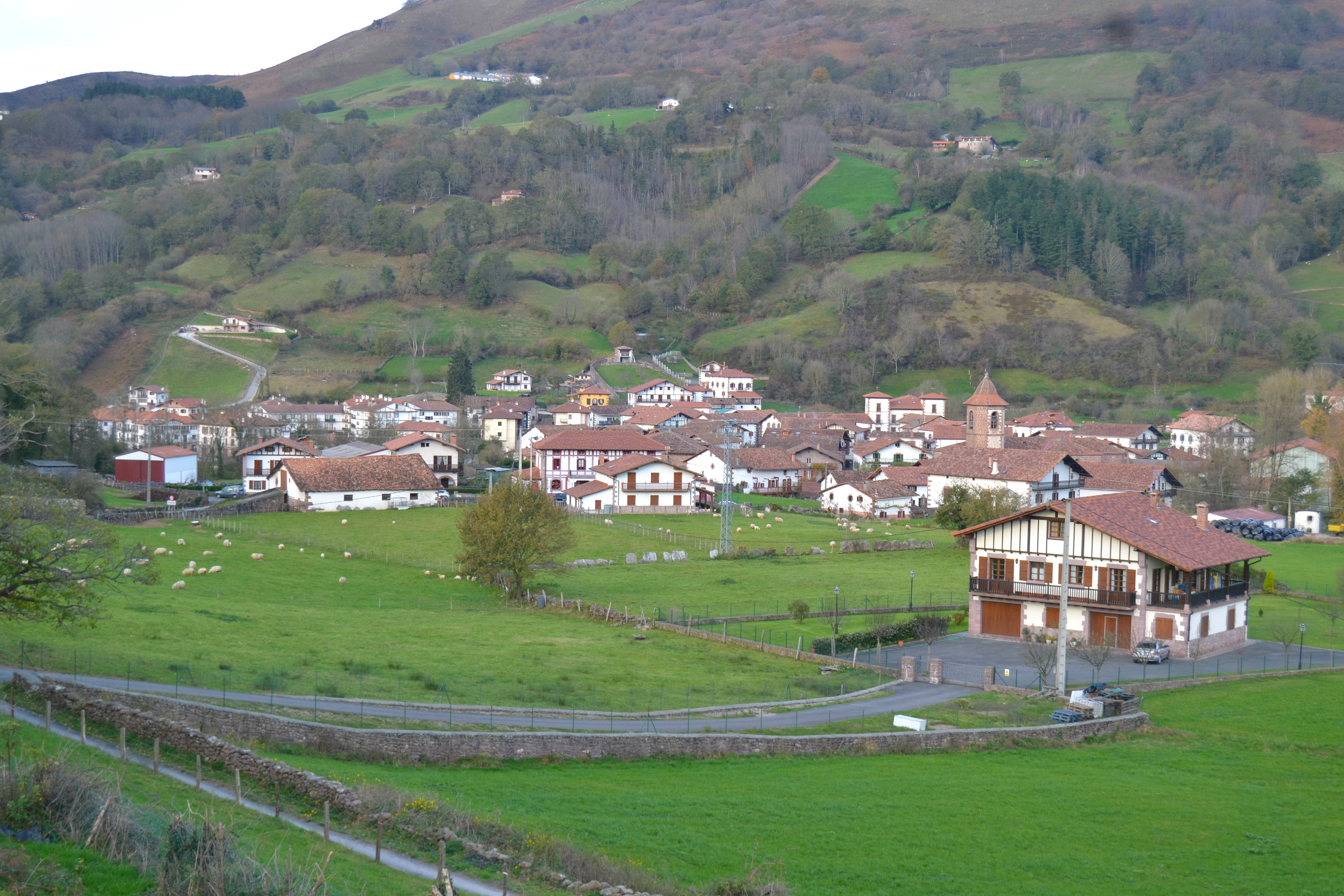

- Location in Navarre Location in Spain
- Coordinates: 43°10′51″N 1°27′21″W
- Country: Spain
- Community: Navarre
- Province: Navarre
- Special division: Baztan
- Municipality: Baztan

Population (2017)
  - Total: 471
- Time zone: UTC+1 (GMT)
  - Summer (DST): UTC+2 (GMT)

Erratzu is a village located in the municipality of Baztan, Navarre, Spain.

It lies on the NA-2600 which runs a few kilometres east to the border with France at Izpegi Pass.

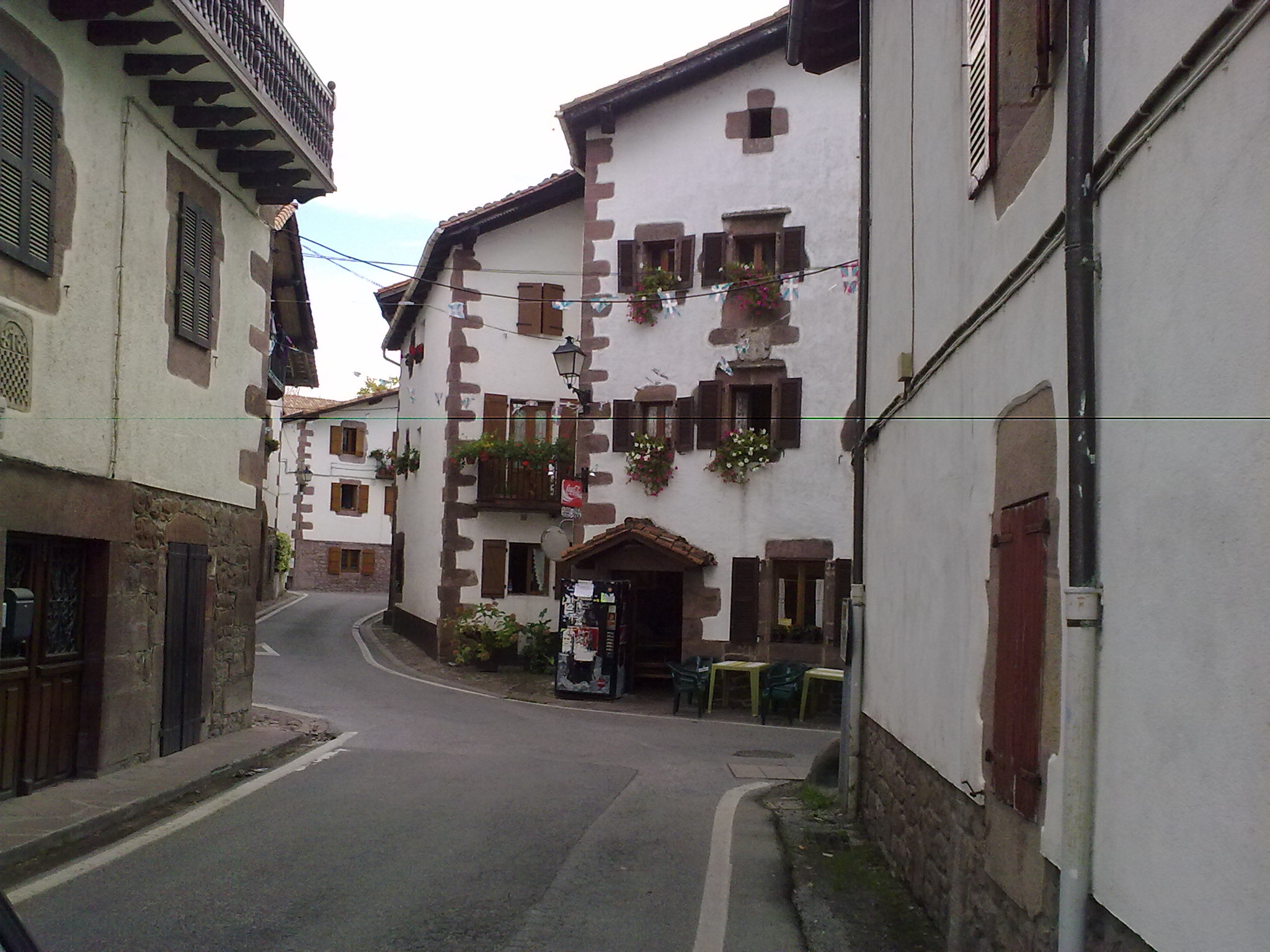
A street in Erratzu
