= Berroeta =

- village
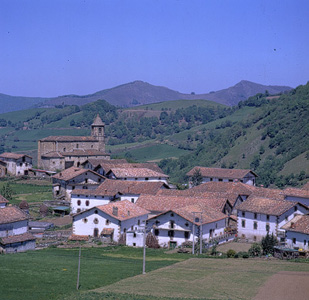

- Location in Navarre Location in Spain
- Coordinates: 43°06′14″N 1°35′23″W
- Country: Spain
- Community: Navarre
- Province: Navarre
- Special division: Baztan
- Municipality: Baztan

Population (2010)
  - Total: 123

Berroeta is a village located in the municipality of Baztan, Navarre, Spain.
