= Irurita =

- village
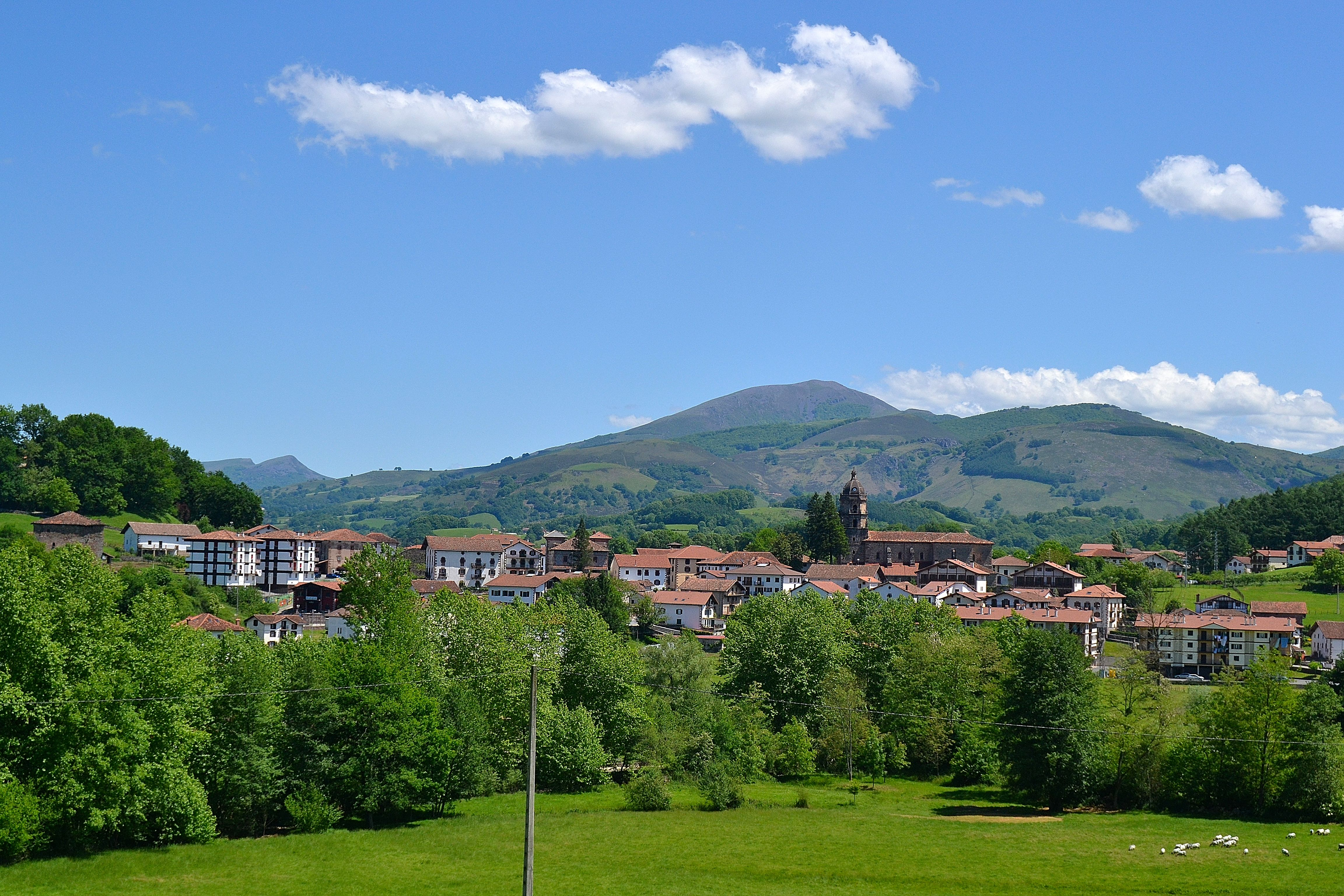

- Location in Navarre Location in Spain
- Coordinates: 43°07′52″N 1°32′49″W
- Country: Spain
- Community: Navarre
- Province: Navarre
- Special division: Baztan
- Municipality: Baztan

Population (2014)
  - Total: 829
- Time zone: UTC+1 (GMT)
  - Summer (DST): UTC+2 (GMT)

Irurita is a village located in the municipality of Baztan, Navarre, Spain.
