= Aniz =

- village
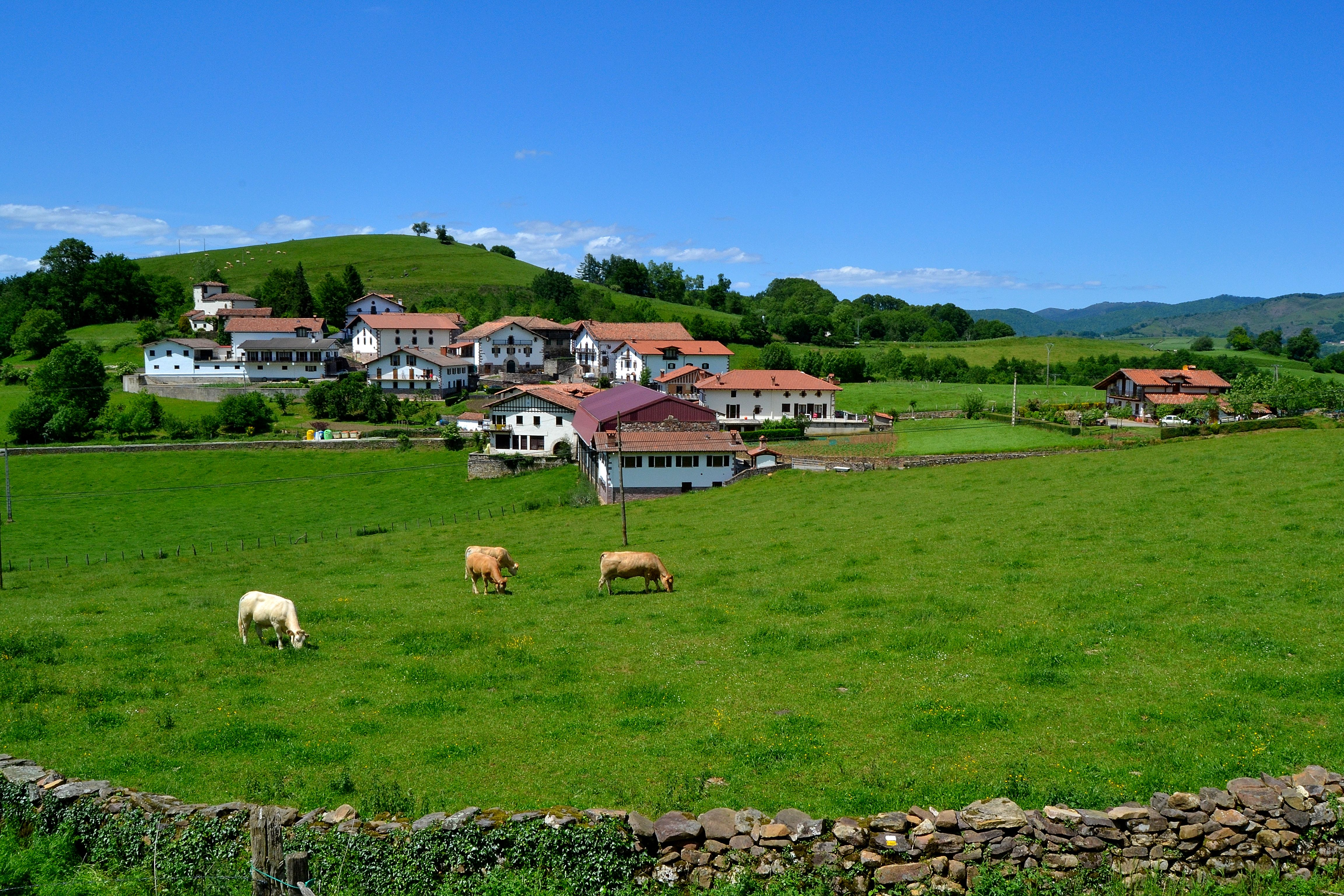

- Location in Navarre Location in Spain
- Coordinates: 43°06′44″N 1°33′52″W
- Country: Spain
- Community: Navarre
- Province: Navarre
- Special division: Baztan
- Municipality: Baztan

Population (2015)
  - Total: 79

Aniz is a village located in the municipality of Baztan, Navarre, Spain.
