= Castañedo =

Castañedo may refer to:

- Castañedo (Belmonte), a parish in Belmonte de Miranda, Asturias, Spain
- Castañedo (Grado), a parish in Grado, Asturias, Spain
- Castañedo (Narcea), a parish in Cangas del Narcea, Asturias, Spain
- Castañedo del Monte, a parish in Santo Adriano, Asturias, Spain
