= Las Estacas =

- Parish
- Location within Spain
- Country: Spain
- Autonomous community: Asturias
- Province: Asturias
- Municipality: Belmonte de Miranda

Las Estacas is one of 15 parishes (administrative divisions) in Belmonte de Miranda, a municipality within the province and autonomous community of Asturias, in northern Spain.

It is 14.15 km^{2} (5.46 sq mi) in size with a population of 64 (INE 2011). The village of Las Estacas is about 10 kilometers from Belmonte, the capital of the municipality. It is located at the foot of Pico Corona and Collado del Muro, above the Las Dorniellas stream. At about 620 meters above sea level, it is accessed via the AS-310 road from La Herrería.
