= Ondes (disambiguation) =

Ondes is a commune in southwestern France. Ondes or Öndeş may also refer to

- ondes Martenot, an early electronic musical instrument
- Selen Öndeş (born 1988), Turkish volleyball player
- Saint-Benoît-des-Ondes, a commune in northwestern France
- Saint-Méloir-des-Ondes, a commune in northwestern France
- San Martín de Ondes, a parish in northern Spain
