= Vigaña =

Vigaña may refer to:

- Vigaña (Belmonte), a parish of Belmonte de Miranda municipality, Asturias, northern Spain
- Vigaña (Grado), a parish of Grado municipality, Asturias, northern Spain
