= Baztan, Navarre =

Baztan
- Municipality
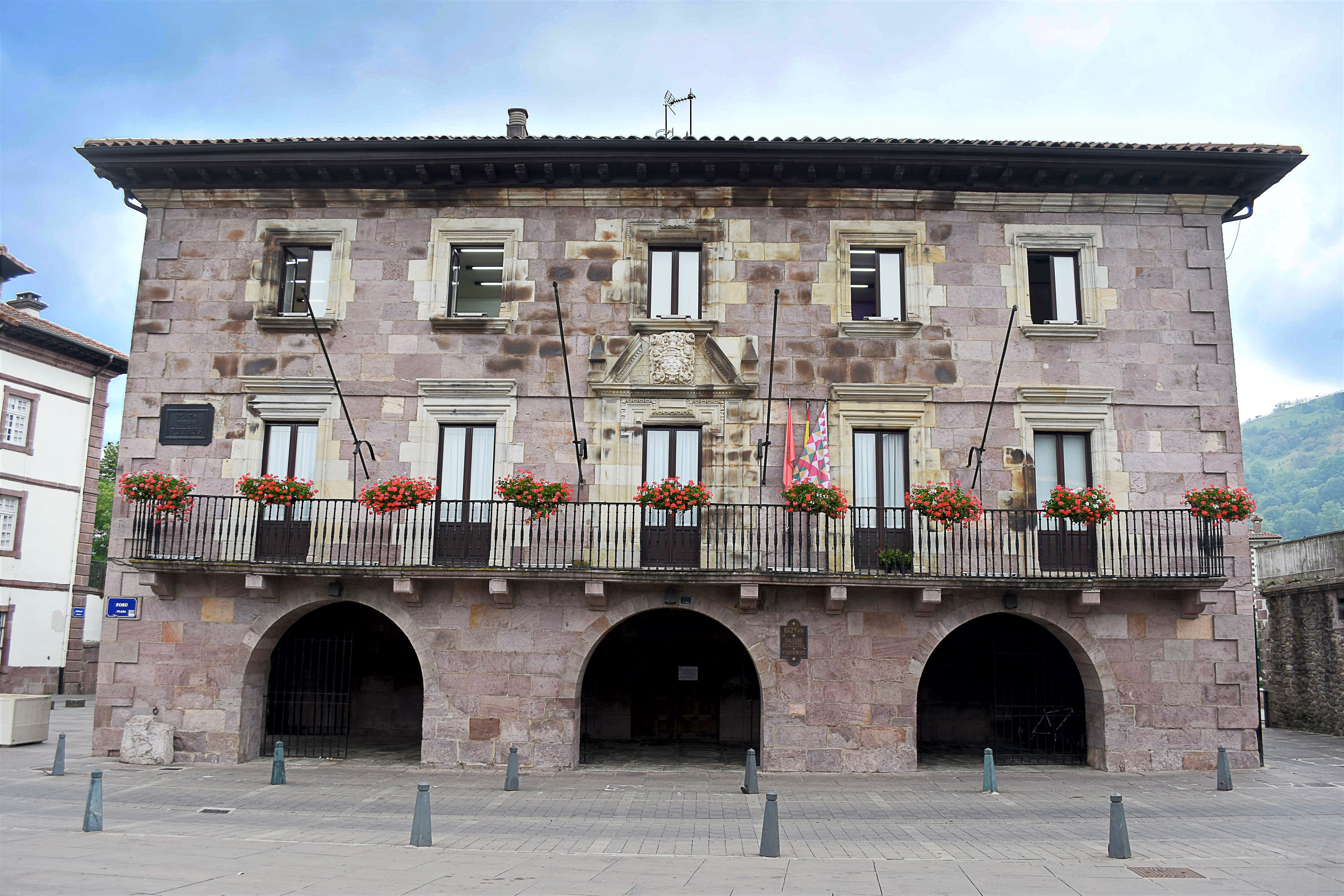
- Town hall

- Flag Coat of arms

- Coordinates: 43.15°N 1.52°W
- Country: Spain
- Autonomous community: Navarre
- Province: Navarre
- Comarca/Eskualdea: Baztan
- Capital: Elizondo

Government
  - Mayor: Joseba Xabier Otondo Bikondoa (EH Bildu)

Area
  - Total: 376.81 km^{2} (145.49 sq mi)

Population (2025-01-01)
  - Total: 7,851
  - Density: 20.84/km^{2} (53.96/sq mi)
- (INE)
- Time zone: UTC+1 (CET)
  - Summer (DST): UTC+2 (CEST)
- Postal code: 31700
- Dialing code: 948
- Website: www.baztan.es

Baztan is a municipality in the Chartered Community of Navarre, northern Spain. It is located 58 km (36 mi) from Pamplona, the capital of Navarre. It is the largest municipality in Navarre, with around 376.8 km^{2} and just over 8,000 inhabitants.

== Settlements ==
The capital of the valley is Elizondo, and includes 15 other villages, as follows:

- Amaiur-Maia
- Aniz
- Arraioz
- Almandoz
- Arizkun
- Azpilikueta
- Berroeta
- Elbete
- Erratzu
- Gartzain
- Irurita
- Lekaroz
- Oronoz-Mugairi
- Ziga

== Geography ==
The territory of the Baztan valley extends over an area of 377 square km of which much is common land jointly owned by the residents of the Baztan valley and primarily used as grazing ground for flocks of sheep and herds of semi-wild horses. The Baztan Valley borders with the French Basque regions of Lapurdi and Lower Navarre which is accessed by the Izpegi Pass to the east of the valley and Dantxarinea to the north. This vicinity to France and its ties with its Basque neighbours has greatly characterised the history of the Baztan people over the past centuries. In 2013, there were 7,974 people living in the Baztan Valley with 3489 people living in the capital of Elizondo. The remaining population are spread out between the other 14 mountain villages (see above).

The Baztan Valley is sparsely populated with small-scale pastoral farming making use of the verdant pastures along the banks of the Baztan river. Orchards of apple, quince, cherry, pear and peach trees are common and more recently kiwis have been planted in the area. The mountain slopes are densely covered with oak, chestnut, walnut, beech, and ash. The odd palm tree can sometimes be found in the grounds of the larger manor houses in the area and often belies family links to the Americas where many Baztan people have emigrated since the 16th century.

== History ==
=== Viscounty (1025-1235) ===
Shield of Navarre

Counts of Champagne and Kings of Navarre coat of arms

Coat of arms of the Capet Navarrese dynasty

Coat of arms of the Capet-Évreux dynasty

Around 1025 the duke of Gascony, Sancho VI William (son of Duke William II Sánchez and Urraca Garcés of Navarre, widow of Count Fernán González of Castile), gave part of the duchy to King Sancho III of Navarre. Sancho created a lordship for Ximen I Ochoaniz consisting of the Baztan Valley. His son Garcia Xemeniz became a viscount between 1055 and 1065, and his grandson Ximen I Garciez (lord of Lizarra and the Salazar Valley from 1051 to 1080) donated land to the monastery of Leire in exchange for a pardon for assassinating his nephew.

When his siblings assassinated King Sancho IV of Navarre in 1076, they colluded with the bishops of Bayonne. The kings of Navarre were Ramiro I of Aragon and Navarre (Sancho III of Navarre's son, died 1065) and his successor Sancho Ramirez, known as Sancho V of Navarre and Aragon. These Navarrese-Aragonese kings ruled the thinly-populated Aragon with less military strength than Alfonso VI of Castile (1040–1109), a nephew of Ramiro I of Aragon.

Viscount Ximen II's daughter, Maria, married Fortun Enneconis de Los Cameros in 1085.

They had two sons: Ximen III Fortunez (Viscount of Baztan) in 1119 and Pedro I Fortunez, the following viscount. A son of Viscount Pedro II Pedriz of Baztan married around 1110 and had three sons: Sancho Pedriz de Baztan, Pedro Pedriz de Baztan and Ximen Pedriz de Baztan.

At this time, the king of Navarre and Aragon was Sancho V Ramirez. His successor was his son by a second marriage to a French Nordic aristocrat, Félicia de Roucy: Alfonso I of Aragon and Navarre (died 1134). Alfonso besieged Bayonne for nearly a year in 1131 before conquering it. His successor was Garcia IV Ramirez (died 1150).

During the 1150s the fishing towns of the Gulf of Biscay between Bordeaux and Vigo, between the Duchy of Normandy and the new Iberian kingdom of Portugal (including the Basque Country), became trading hubs for iron, wool, gold, silver, glass, salt and leather. Garcia IV's grandson, Sancho VII of Navarre (died 1234), was succeeded by the count of Champagne, Theobald I of Navarre.

=== Champagne counts (1235–1305) ===
Theobald I of Navarre was succeeded by Theobald II of Navarre (c. 1238 – December 4, 1270), who died childless. The Navarrese crown passed to his youngest brother, Henry I of Navarre (c. 1244 – 22 July 1274), who ruled for about three years.

=== Capet-Évreux dynasty (1348-1446) ===
Joanna II of Navarre (born 1312) married Philip III of Navarre, who was killed in 1343. She died in 1349. France and Navarre were de facto independent kingdoms.

Their eldest son was Charles II of Navarre (1332–1387), who ruled for about 38 years. His heir was King Charles III of Navarre (died 1425), who also ruled also for about 38 years. His daughter was Queen Blanche I of Navarre, who ruled from 1425 to 1441.

=== Families ===
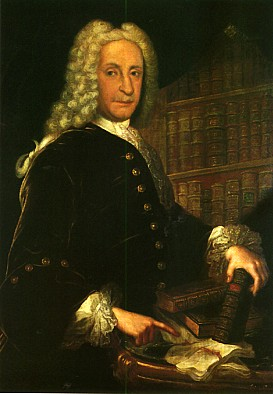
Juan de Goyeneche by Miguel Jacinto Meléndez (1679–1734)

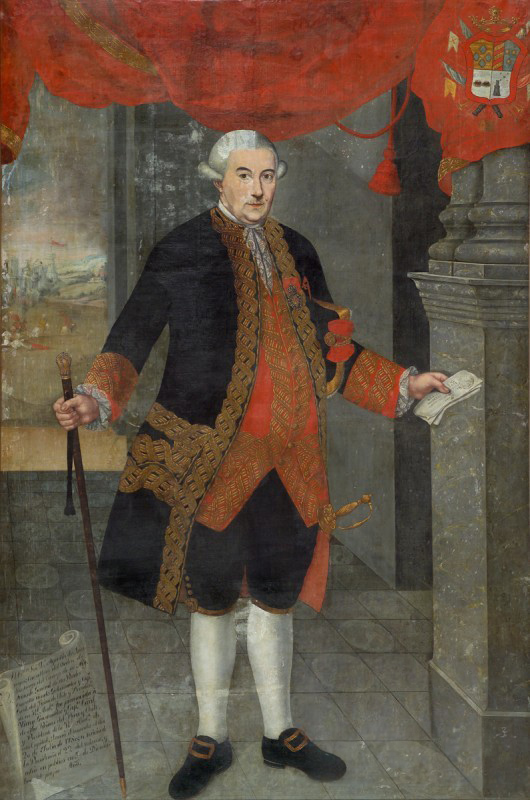
Portrait of Agustín de Jáuregui y Aldecoa, Viceroy of Peru

The Escors family, from Aquitaine, settled in the kingdom of Navarre in 1234 after the counts of Champagne inherited the throne. The family represented the kings of Navarre in governmental, financial and military affairs from the 13th to the 15th centuries. Nicolás Ambrosio de Garro y Arizkun, (Madrid, 1747 - Ibidem, 20 April 1825) became Marqués de las Hormazas in 1767.

Juan de Goyeneche y Gastón, (Baztan, 1656 - Nuevo Baztan, Madrid, April 1735) became the treasurer and financial adviser to the queen consorts of Spain around 1680, and provided war materiel to the Spanish Army for over 30 years. His palace in Madrid is now the Real Academia de Bellas Artes de San Fernando.

Juan Francisco de Goyeneche Irigoyen was the Marqués de Ugena. Francisco Miguel de Goyeneche y Balzá, Conde de Saceda, received his title from King Felipe V on 17 December 1743.

Miguel Gastón de Iriarte y Elizacoechea built the family palace in Irurita, Baztan. Agustín de Jáuregui y Aldekoa, (Lekaroz, Baztan, 1711 - Lima, 27 April 1784), was Royal Governor of Chile from 1772 to 1780 and Viceroy of Peru from 1780 to 1784. Martín de Ursúa Arizmendi y Agirre, (Arizkun, Baztan, February 1653 - Philippine Islands, 4 February 1715), Conde de Lizárraga, was governor of the Philippines from 25 August 1709 until his death.

== Architecture ==
The large detached farmhouses which characterise the Baztan valley are built in typical Basque style with solid wooden frames and eaves and wooden balconies often decorated with geraniums. Distinctive pink sandstone is hewn from the quarries in the Baztan valley and blocks of it are used to outline the windows, doors and corners of the houses giving them a very distinctive quality. The Baztan style of architecture is strictly protected by numerous building regulations so that modern buildings in the area blend in harmoniously with the local Basque design.

One of the oldest (although lesser publicised) routes of the Camino de Santiago (Way of St. James) crosses the Baztan valley and runs along much of the valley floor through the villages of Urdax, Amaiur, Arizkun, Elizondo and Ziga and means that some structures in the area date back as far as the 10th century – with specific mention of the Monastery and Pilgrims Hospital in Urdax. However, the majority of the buildings in the area date back to the 17th and 18th centuries when there was a population explosion as many families, having made money in the Americas, returned home. Their new-found wealth was ploughed back into the local community giving rise to opulent churches, with specific reference to the impressive 17th century Herrerian-styled church in Ziga and into the huge manor houses, easily discerned by their four-way sloping roofs, intricately carved eaves and elaborate coats of arms.

== Economy ==
Traditionally the Baztan Valley is made up of many small family farming units dedicated to pastoral farming and the raising of pigs, sheep and cows; the last two being raised for both their meat and milk. Small dairies in the area produce yoghurts and cheeses and the sheep's cheese of the area (a local version of the Domination of Origin Idiazabal cheese). Small-scaled enterprises in the Baztan Valley also produce chocolates, cakes, jams, cuts of meat, liqueurs and cider and there are several small saw mills and stone quarries. Given the natural resources of wood, stone and marble that are found in the valley, construction has also been a relatively large employer and traditionally much business has always been done with their French Basque neighbours over the border.

Since around the year 2000, the gradual decline in farming activities has been replaced by small-scale rural tourism and many traditional farmhouses have been restored to make impressive rental properties and bed and breakfasts. There is a range of tourist services, including documented and sign-posted walks and the villages offer ethnographical museums and artists' ateliers, watermills, equestrian centres and outdoor sports companies. The Baztan valley is well known throughout Spain although international tourism is only just starting to arrive.

== Culture ==
The culture of the Baztan valley is quintessentially Basque and Euskera is the main language spoken at home. The majority of the Baztan children are schooled in Basque at local Ikastolas although the larger schools do offer the opportunity to be schooled in Spanish. In many of the Ikastolas Spanish is taught as a second language as well as English, which is sometimes allocated more teaching hours than Spanish. There are no universities in the Baztan valley and so many young students leave to study further afield in the larger cities of Pamplona or San Sebastian although their links with the valley remain strong with many young people seeking to return to the valley to settle down at a later age. In 2013 there were 473 more people living in the Baztan valley than in 2001. Each village has its own traditional fiestas and carnivals, many of them dating back to pagan times.

These village fiestas and festivals are popular among the Baztan people where there is a strong sense of identity and a deep-seated loyalty for their Basque language and cultural roots. A clear example of this is the Sagar Dantza (apple dance) in Arizkun which is enacted each Shrove Tuesday.

In 2012 Iñaki Elizalde launched his film 'Baztan' at the San Sebastian Film Festival. The film was about the Agotes; a mysterious people of pariah status who lived in the hamlet of Bozate, near Arizkun.

In 2013 Dolores Redondo published the first of her crime fiction books of The Baztan Trilogy which were translated into over 20 languages. The stories are situated in the Baztan Valley.
