= Ḷḷamosu =

- Parish
- Location within Spain
- Country: Spain
- Autonomous community: Asturias
- Province: Asturias
- Municipality: Belmonte de Miranda

Ḷḷamosu is one of 15 parishes (administrative divisions) in Belmonte de Miranda, a municipality within the province and autonomous community of Asturias, in northern Spain.

It is 7.48 km^{2} (2.89 sq mi) in size with a population of 31 (INE 2005).
