= Bixega =

- Parish
- Location within Spain
- Country: Spain
- Autonomous community: Asturias
- Province: Asturias
- Municipality: Belmonte de Miranda

Population
  - Total: 65

Bixega is one of 15 parishes (administrative divisions) in Belmonte de Miranda, a municipality within the province and autonomous community of Asturias, in northern Spain.

It is 13.34 km^{2} (5.15 sq mi) in size with a population of 65 (INE 2011).

== Villages ==
- Bixega
- El Pontigu
- Santa Marina
- El Valle
- Viḷḷaverde
