= Montoubu =

- Parish
- Location within Spain
- Coordinates: 43°12′17″N 6°13′22″W
- Country: Spain
- Autonomous community: Asturias
- Province: Asturias
- Municipality: Belmonte de Miranda

Population
  - Total: 23

Montoubu is one of 15 parishes (administrative divisions) in Belmonte de Miranda, a municipality within the province and autonomous community of Asturias, in northern Spain.

It is 12.02 km^{2} (4.64 sq mi) in size with a population of 23 (INE 2011).
