= Zozaia =

Town in Baztan, Navarre, Spain

Coordinates: 43.1238°N 1.5989°W

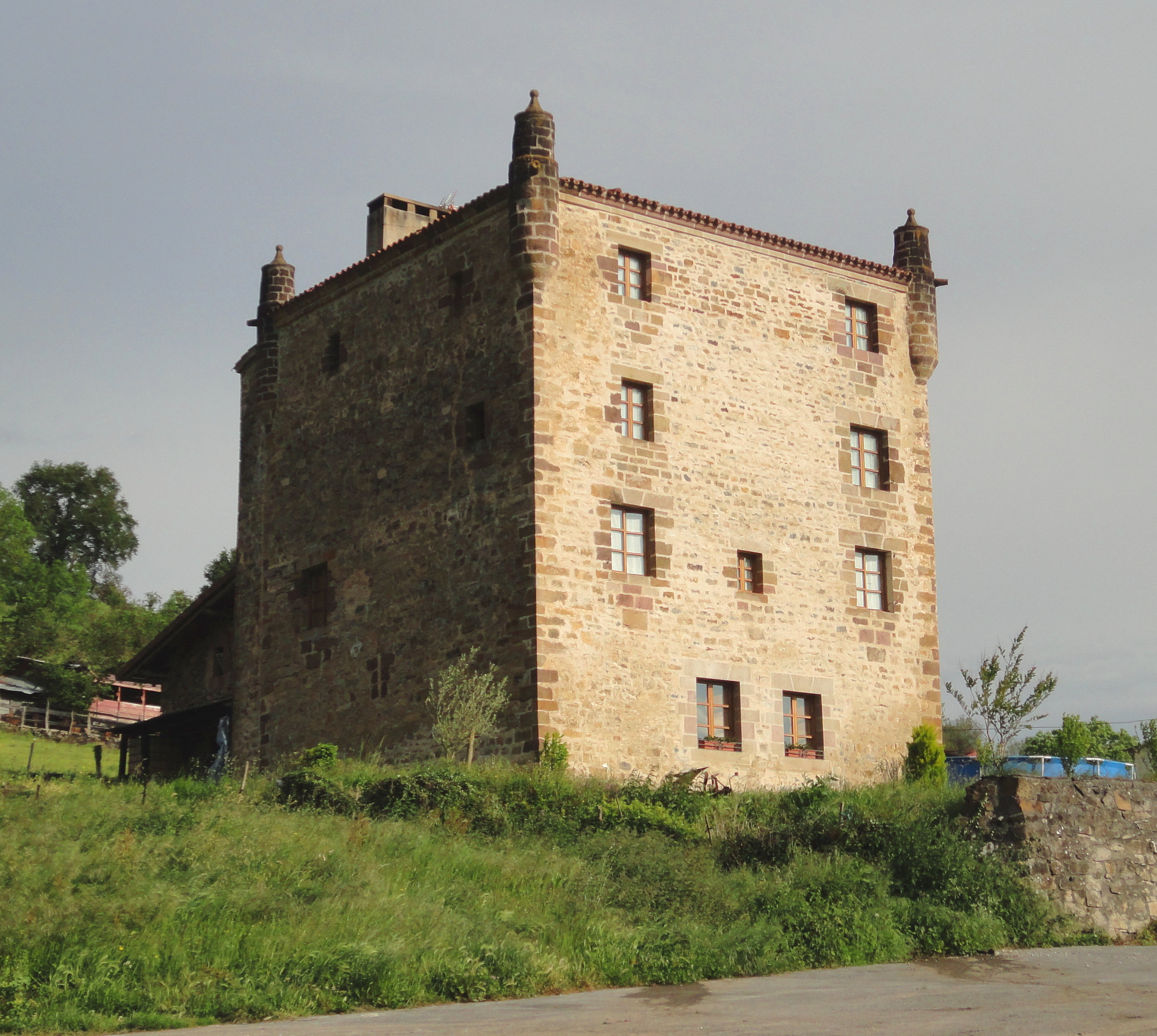
Zozaia Palace from the 16th century

Zozaia is a small town in the Baztan Valley, Navarre, Spain, Europe. Its main feature is a fifteenth-century palace, reconstructed around 1930 and again in 2004, which belonged to the noblemen that once lived there. Today, the town consists of the palace, or main house, and around 10 to 15 houses in all. It also has a small well to supply water to the town.
