= Almurfe =

- Parish
- Location within Spain
- Country: Spain
- Autonomous community: Asturias
- Province: Asturias
- Municipality: Belmonte de Miranda

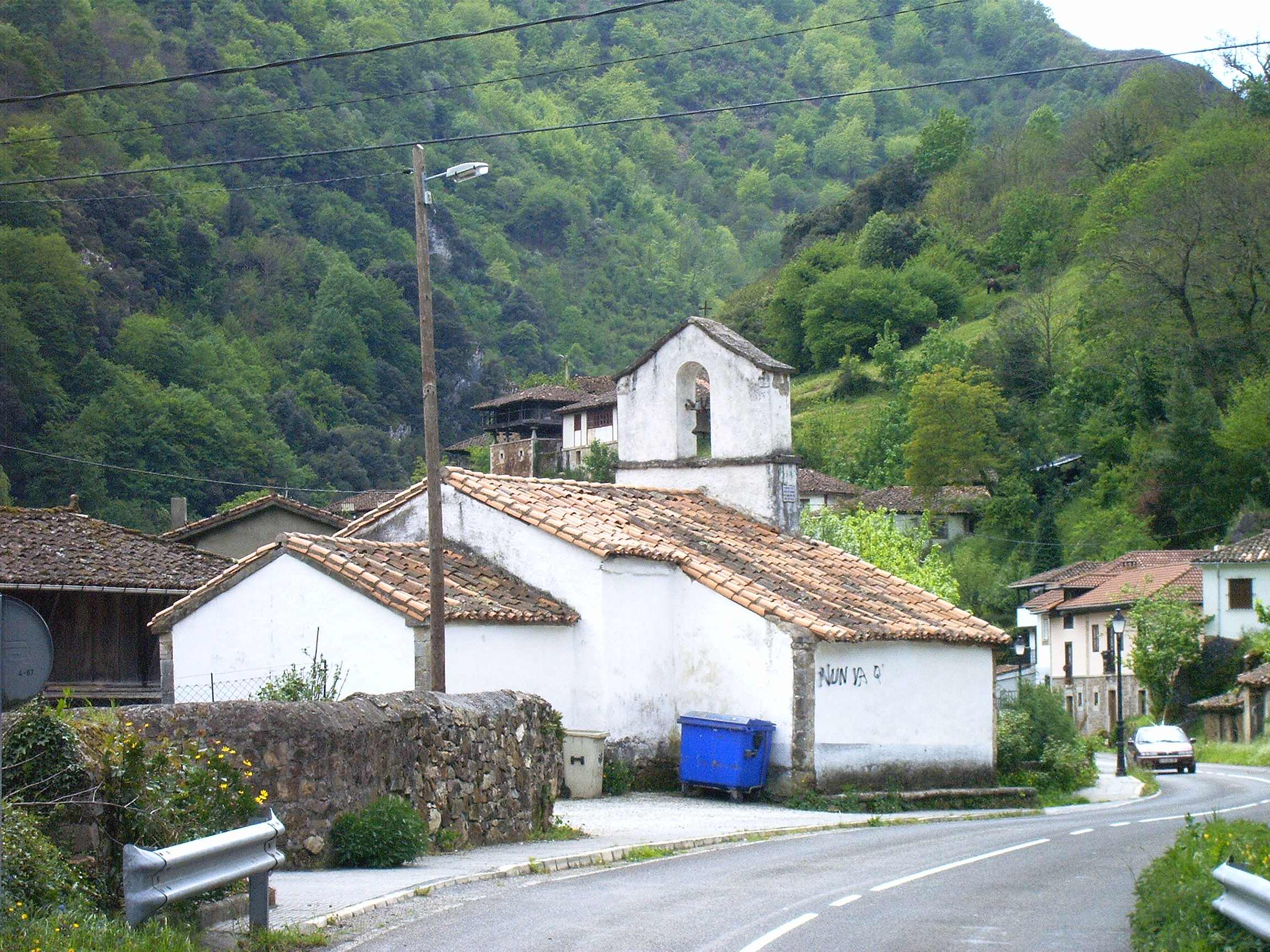
The Santa María de Almurfe church

Almurfe is one of 15 parishes (administrative divisions) in Belmonte de Miranda, a municipality within the province and autonomous community of Asturias, in northern Spain.

It is 5.96 km^{2} (2.30 sq mi) in size with a population of 38 (INE 2004).

== Location ==
Almurfe is located between the towns of Almurfe, Aguasmestas, Bustiasmal and La Casilla.

The village of Almurfe, with 31 inhabitants, is about 13 kilometers from Belmonte. It is located on the River Pigüeña, about 400 meters above sea level and is accessed by the AS-227.

== Villages ==
- Almurfe
- Auguasmestas
- Bustiasmal
- La Casilla

== Feasts ==
The main celebration of the town is on the third Sunday in August.
