= Lleiguarda =

- Parish
- Location within Spain
- Country: Spain
- Autonomous community: Asturias
- Province: Asturias
- Municipality: Belmonte de Miranda

Lleiguarda is one of 15 parishes (administrative divisions) in Belmonte de Miranda, a municipality within the province and autonomous community of Asturias, in northern Spain.

It is 17.28 m (56.7 ft) above sea level and has a population of 148 (INE 2011).

== Villages ==
- Antuñana
- Beyu
- La Forniella
- Lleiguarda
- Menes
- Modreiros
- Pandu
- Silviella
- La Viña
