= Bidasoa =

River in Spain and France

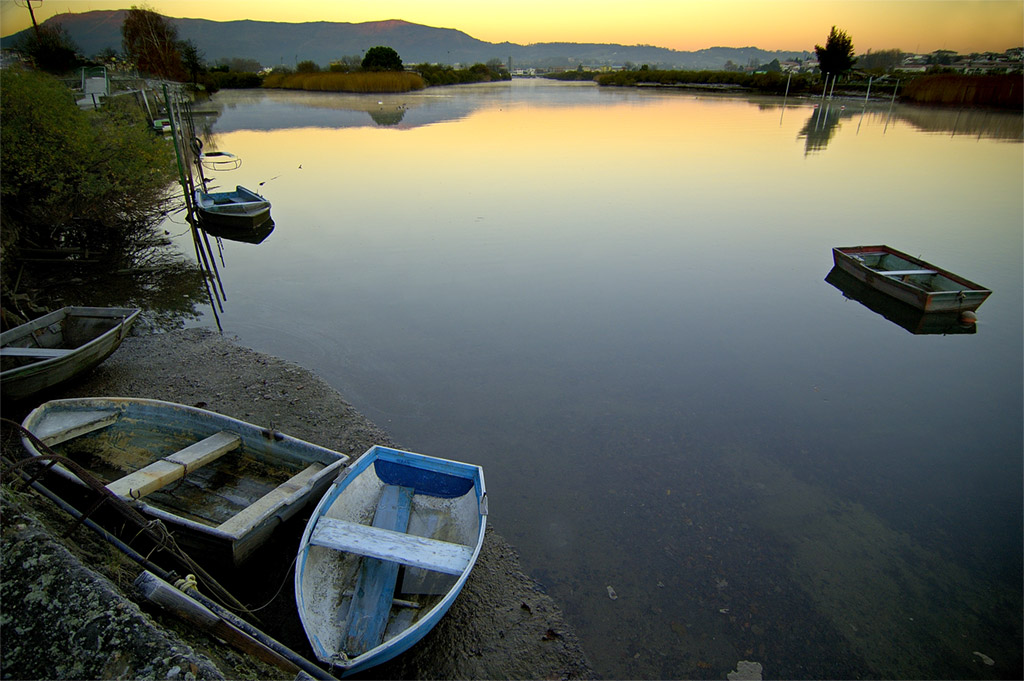
- The Bidasoa in Spain

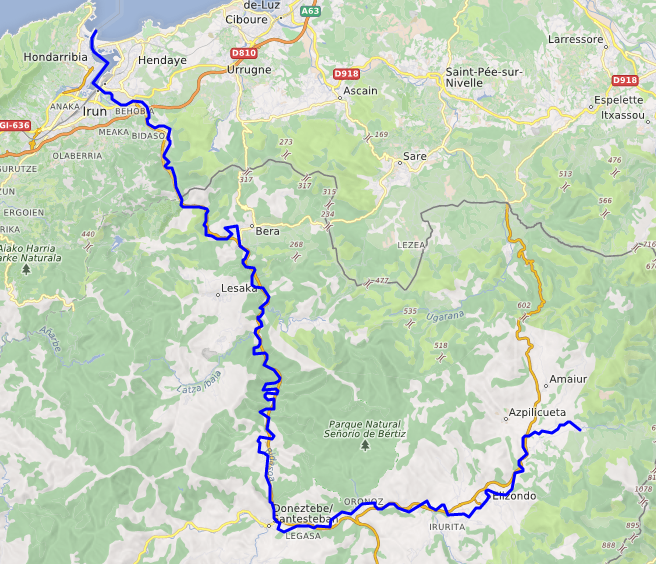

Location
- Countries: Spain; France

Physical characteristics
- Source
  - location: Western Pyrenees
- Mouth
  - location: Bay of Biscay
  - coordinates: 43°22′22″N 1°47′31″W
- Length: 66 km (41 mi)
- Basin size: 705 km^{2} (272 sq mi)
- Discharge
  - average: 24.7 m^{3}/s (870 cu ft/s)

The Bidasoa (Basque: [bi'd̪as̺oa]; Spanish: [biða'soa]; French: Bidassoa, pronounced [bidasɔa]) is a river in the Basque Country of northern Spain and southern France that runs largely south to north. Named as such downstream of the village of Oronoz-Mugairi (municipality of Baztan) in the province of Navarre, the river actually results from the merger of several streams near the village Erratzu, with the stream Baztan that rises at the north-eastern side of the mount Autza (1,306 m) being considered the source of the Bidasoa. It joins the Cantabrian Sea (Bay of Biscay) between the towns of Hendaye and Hondarribia.

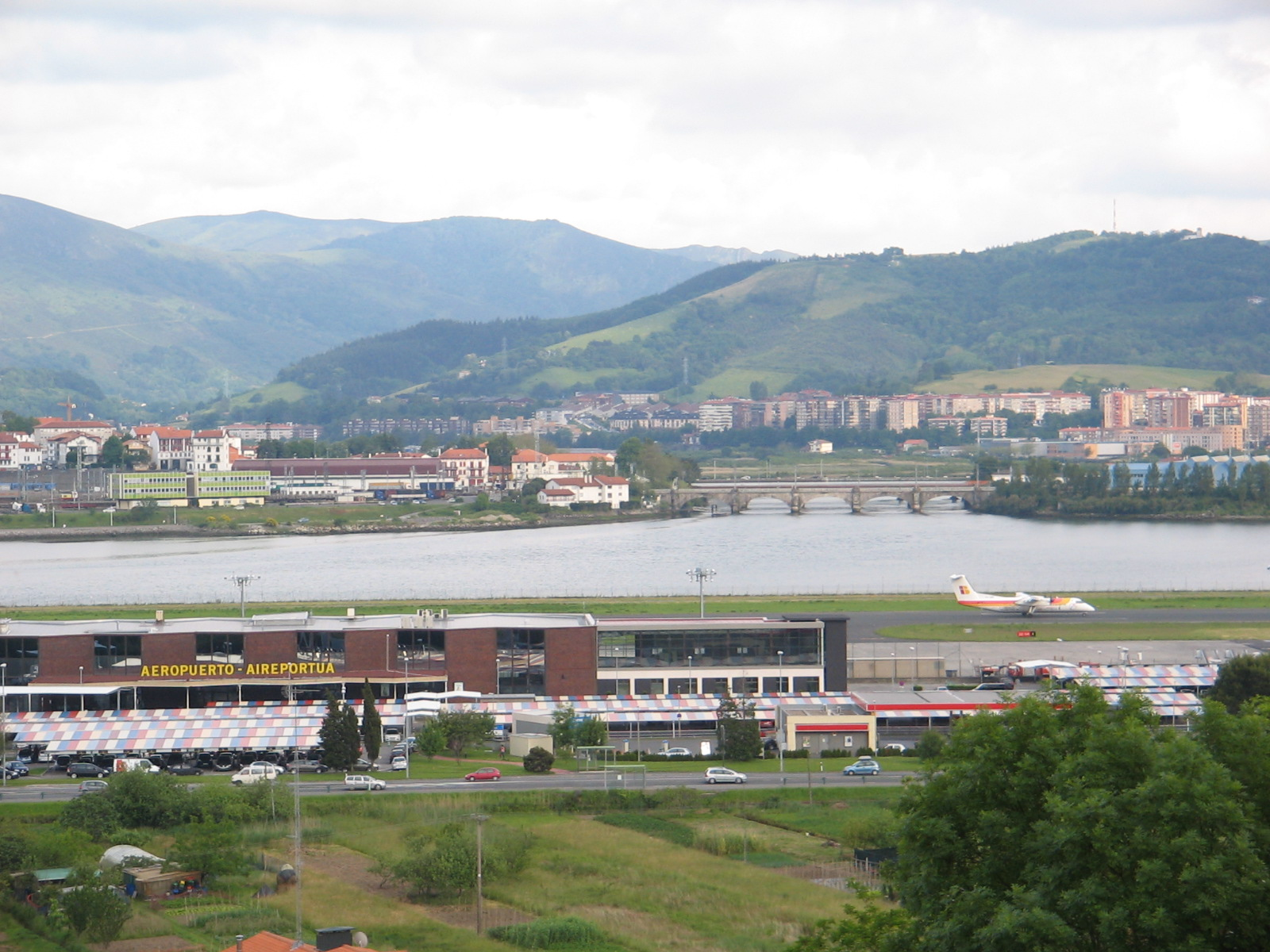
The airport, Txingudi, the SNCF facilities in Hendaye, Irun in the distance and the Santiago Bridge spanning the borderline

The river is best known for establishing the borderline at its lower tract. This stretch is crossed not only by aircraft at low height but by important European communication axes, namely AP8 E5 E80 - E70 A63 (motorway, connection at the Biriatu toll), main roads N1 - N10 (connection at the roundabout of Saizar by the river) and major French and Spanish railway networks,—Renfe and SNCF. Besides these major lines, other regional ones cross it too, e.g. regional railway EuskoTren (terminus in Hendaye) and another double bridge (pedestrians/vehicles) joining the towns on the border, i.e. the historical Santiago Bridge (Way of St. James). At this stage of the river, urban landscape prevails (built-up area).

Before pouring its waters into the ocean, it forms a bay called Txingudi located between these towns and Irun, the site being designated Wetland of International Importance in 2002, with a total area of 1.28 km^{2} (0.49 sq mi). The banks of Hondarribia hold the minor San Sebastian Airport serving domestic flights and currently mired in controversy over its lengthening and upgrading scheme.

== Pronunciation and etymology ==
The river comprises an area of linguistic contact, so it is pronounced differently depending on the language, namely [biˈd̪as̺oa] in Basque, [biðaˈsoa] in Spanish, and [bi'dasoa] in French. Linguistic and historic research point to the name stemming from Latin phrase "Via ad Oiassonem" (later corrupting into Basque "Bidasoa") on account of the road that linked at Roman times Basque town Pompaelo with Oiasso, which may have run along the river.

== Course of the river and tributaries ==
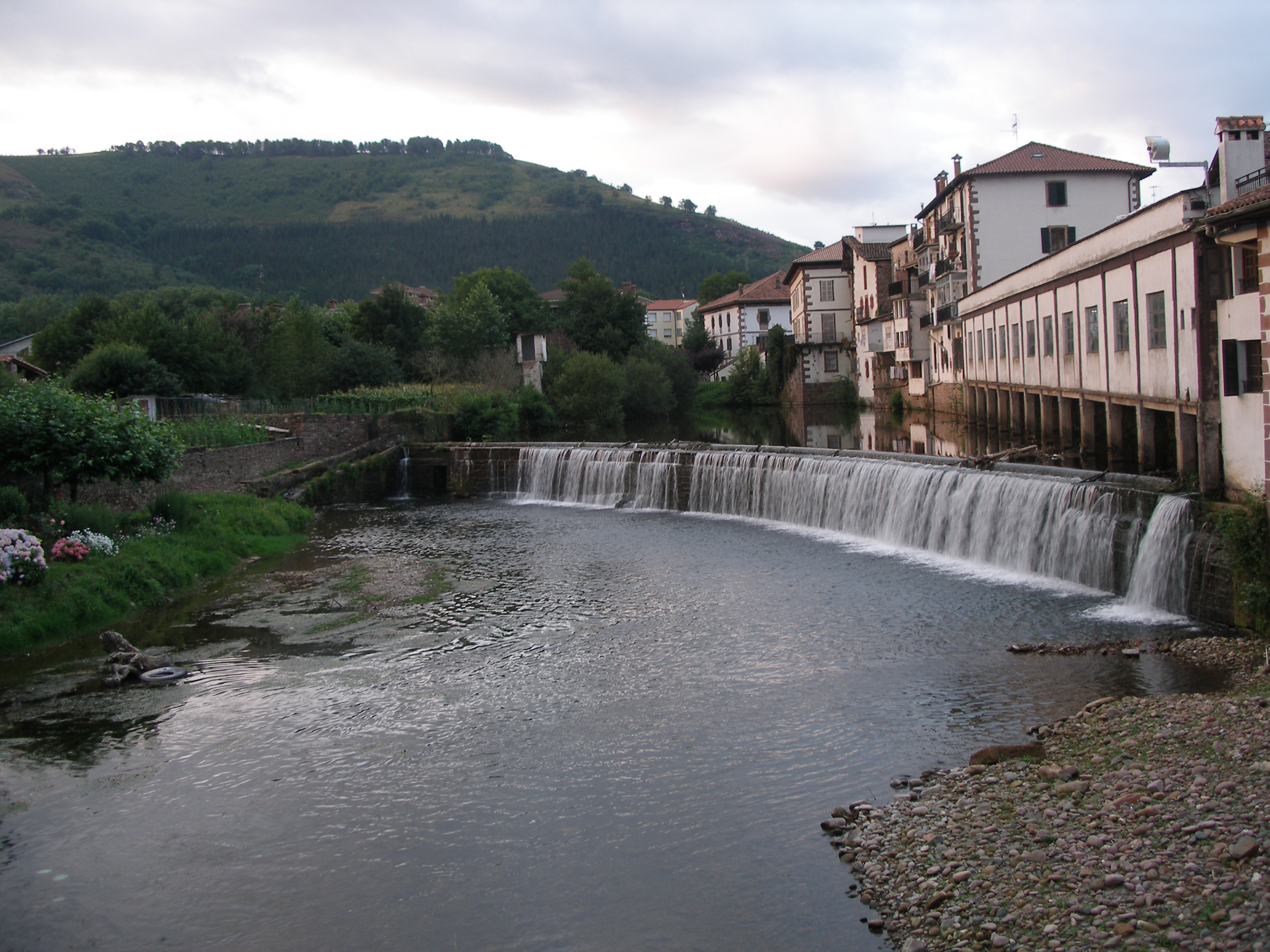
The Bidasoa at Elizondo

The Bidasoa flows through much of its 66 km (41 mi) length over Navarrese territory, except for the last 10 km (6.2 mi), where it establishes the borderline between France and Spain, as well as the boundary between the Basque provinces of Gipuzkoa and Labourd. In line with the distribution of the river's length, the bulk of its watershed's area lies on Navarre (684 km^{2} or 264 sq mi). The basin holds 105 permanent streams and rivers that number 497 km (309 mi), the region being drenched in rains regularly. The Navarrese side of the basin (rural landscape) is inhabited by 22,000 inhabitants. 70% of its population have the sewage treated before spilling to the river.

But for the first 15-odd kilometres, the river clings to the north to south disposition of other neighbouring rivers of Gipuzkoa joining the Bay of Biscay, e.g. Urumea, Oria, etc. Strengthened by the waters harvested from the sides of the pass of Belate, downstream of Doneztebe the river heads north and crosses the town of Bera at the north end of Navarre before entering Gipuzkoa at Endarlatsa. From the town of Doneztebe on, the main road N-121 runs along till the roundabout across the river from the toll of Biriatu by the AP-8 (motorway). Next comes the quarter Behobia and the major towns on the shores of the estuary.

The main tributaries of the Bidasoa are the minor rivers Zeberia (length 10.80 km (6.71 mi)), Ezkurra (20.90 km (12.99 mi)), Latsa (11.10 km (6.90 mi)) and Endara (9.90 km (6.15 mi)). Additionally, further small rivers and streams feed the Bidasoa all along.

== Fishing and environmental challenges ==
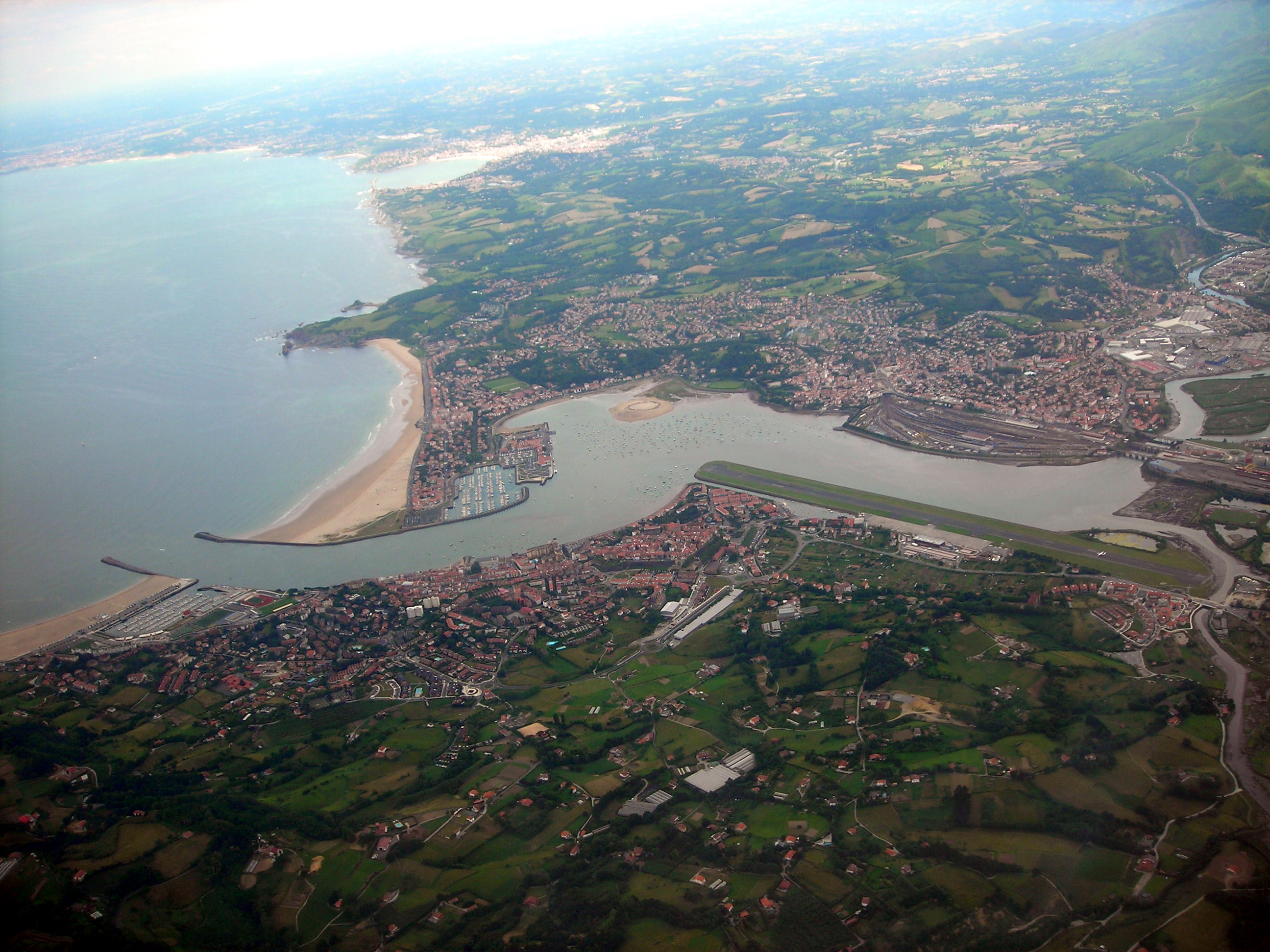
Aerial view of the Bidasoa's mouth and Txingudi

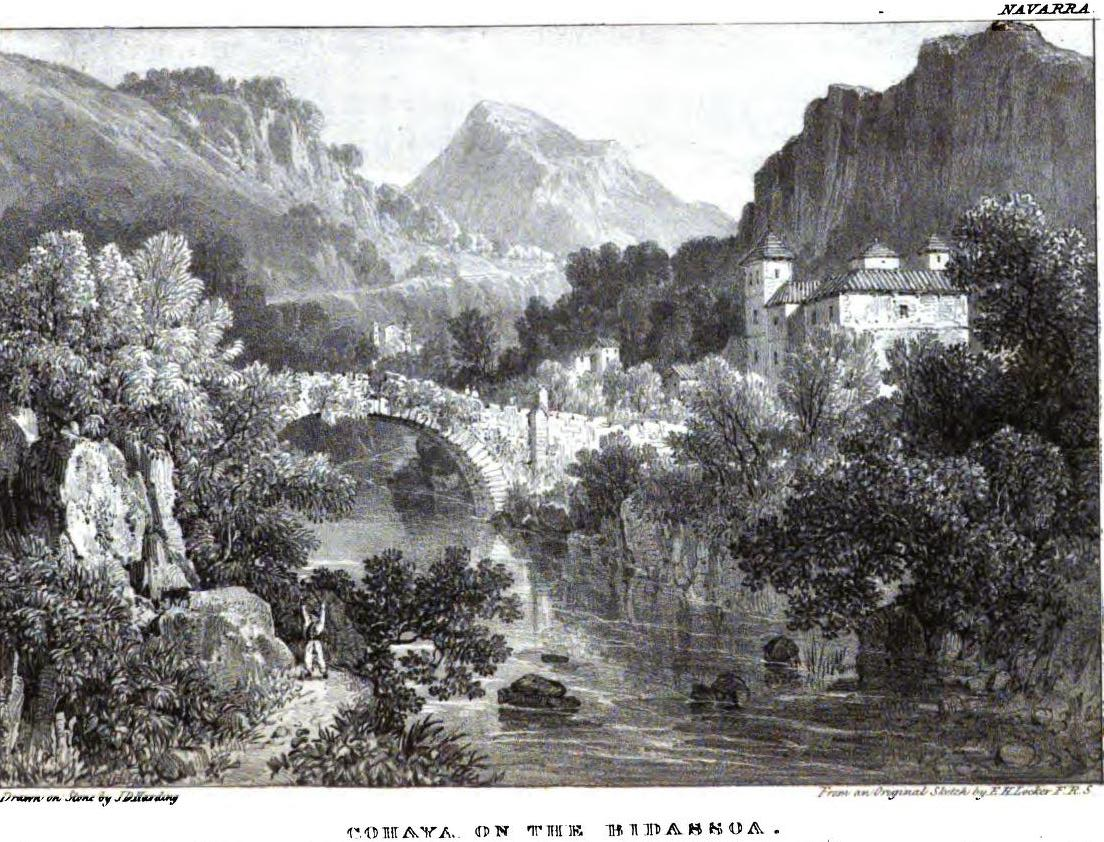
Cohaya on the Bidassoa (in Spain) by Edward Hawke Locker in 1824, published in the work Views in Spain

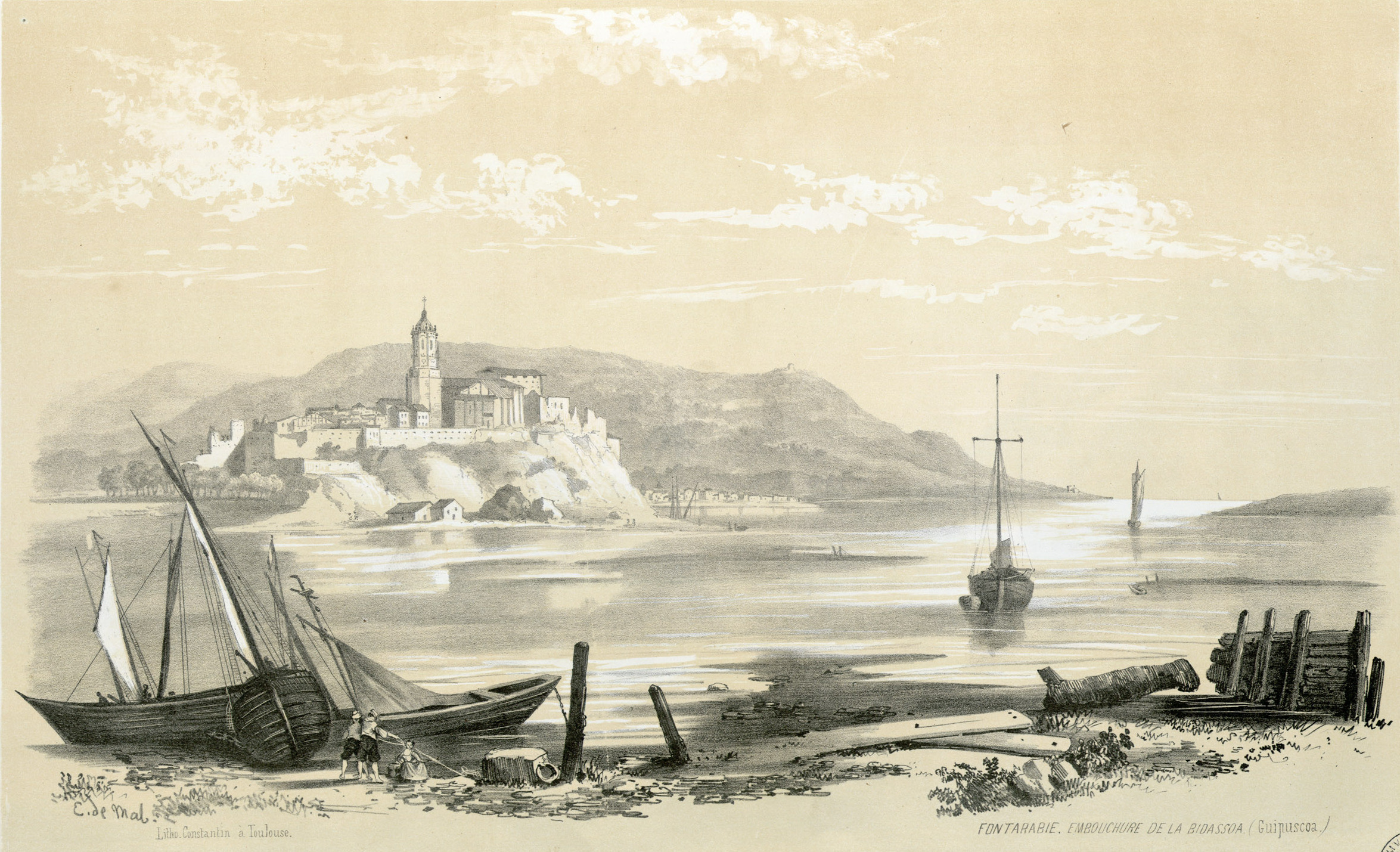
Bidassoa confluence in Fontarrabie, in 1843 by Eugène de Malbos

The Navarrese tract of the river is a preferred destination for fishing enthusiasts, the river being home to several native fish species, namely eel (Anguilla anguilla), salmon (Salmo palar), trout (Salmo trutta), bullhead (Cottus gobio), Barbatula barbatula, Phoxinus phoxinus, gudgeon (Gobio lozanoi), sea lamprey (Petromyzon marinus), allis shad (Alosa alosa), flounder (Platichthys flesus) and grey mullet (Chelon labrosus), some of them declared endangered species and highly interesting (especially bullhead and salmon). Moreover, a species of the Ebro, Chondrostoma miegii, has been introduced in the last 30–40 years on the lower tract of the Bidasoa, thereafter extending gradually upstream.

As a result, overfishing has become a major problem for the river's fauna, with special pressure put on salmon migrating upstream to spawn. They do not make it to their goal and die before spawning, either falling prey to fishers' bait or an inability to overcome hydroelectric power stations (128 over all the course) and the 114 related dams, since 63% of them prevent migratory fish from achieving their purpose. Schemes by the Regional Government of Navarre are underway with a view to handling the issue.

== World War II ==
During World War II between 1941 and 1944, the Comet Escape Line helped 776 people, mostly British and American airmen who had been shot down over Nazi-occupied Europe, escape to Spain. The main route to Spain was crossing the Bidasoa River about 1 mile (1.6 km) south of the village of Biriatou. Comet Line operatives and Basque guides led escaping airmen. They waded across the Bidasoa River at night. The border crossing was illegal and clandestine because of Spanish, French, and German border patrols. Comet leader Antoine d'Ursel, a Belgian, and American airman J. F. Burch were drowned in the flooded river on the night of 23-24 December 1943. A memorial in their honor has been placed near the river crossing where they drowned.

== See also ==
- List of rivers of Spain
- Battle of the Bidassoa (1813)
- Bidasoa-Txingudi
- Pheasant Island (Île des Faisans)
