= Oronoz-Mugairi =

- village
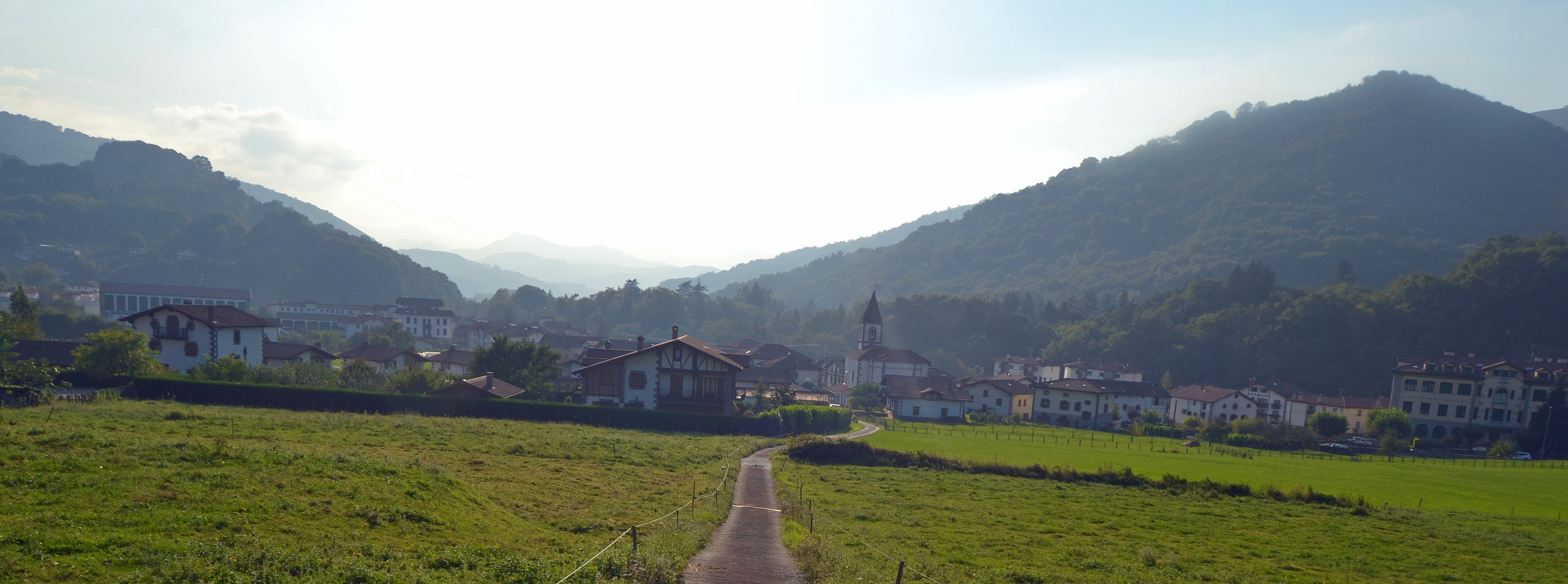

- Location in Navarre Location in Spain
- Coordinates: 43°08′21″N 1°36′26″W
- Country: Spain
- Community: Navarre
- Province: Navarre
- Special division: Baztan
- Municipality: Baztan
- Elevation: 151 m (495 ft)

Population (2014)
  - Total: 457
- Time zone: UTC+1 (GMT)
  - Summer (DST): UTC+2 (GMT)

Oronoz-Mugairi (Spanish: Oronoz-Mugaire) is a village located in the municipality of Baztan, Navarre, Spain.
