= Gartzain =

Village in Baztan, Navarre, Spain

- Locality
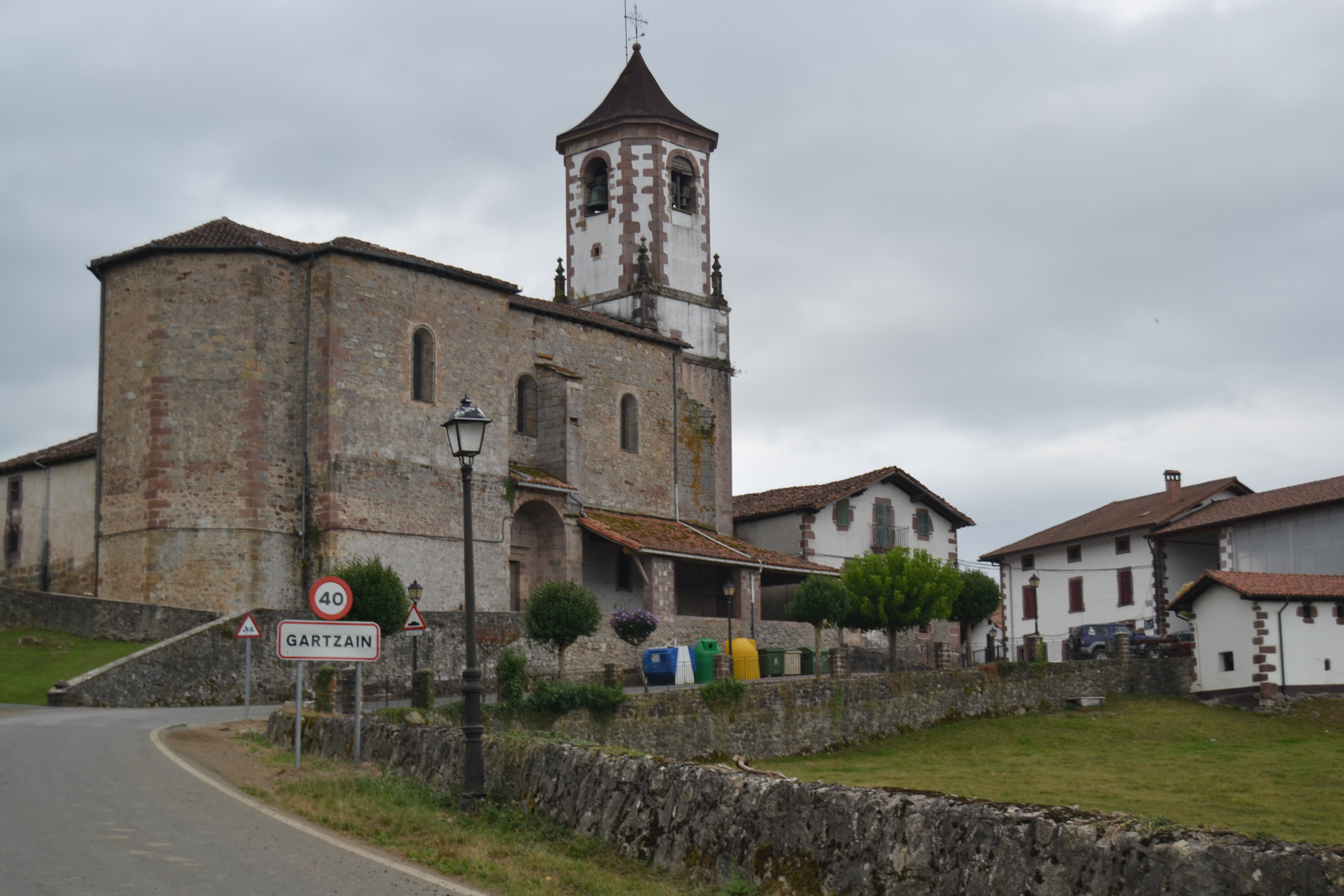

- Location within Navarre Location within Spain
- Coordinates: 43°7′55″N 1°31′58″W
- Country: Spain
- Community: Navarre
- Province: Navarre
- Municipality: Baztan
- Elevation: 229 m (751 ft)

Population
  - Total: 232

Gartzain is a village located in the municipality of Baztan, in Navarre province, Spain. As of 2020, it has a population of 232.

== Geography ==
Gartzain is located 50km north-northeast of Pamplona.
