= Almandoz =

- Locality
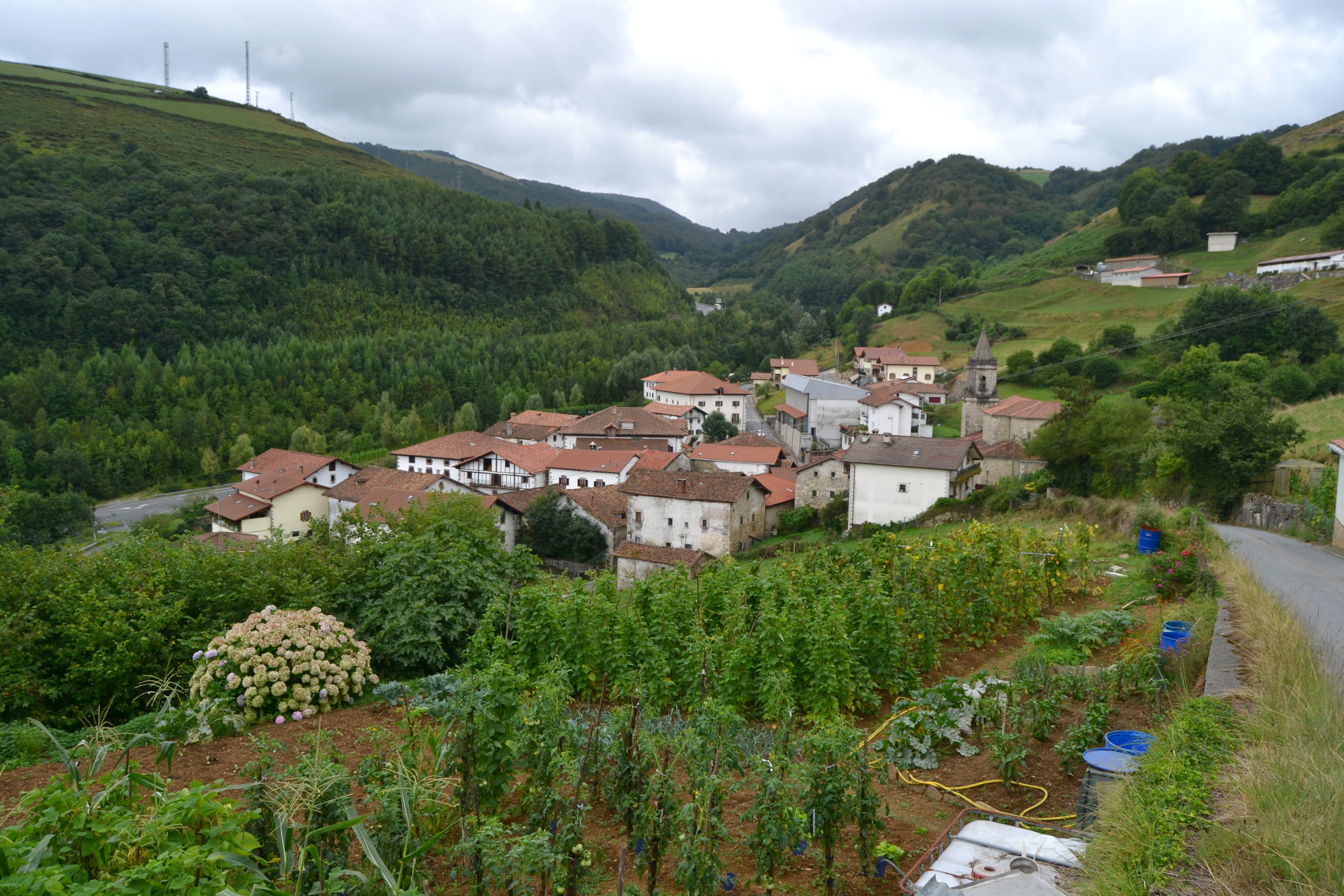

- Location within Navarre Location within Spain
- Coordinates: 43°5′26″N 1°36′16″W
- Country: Spain
- Community: Navarre
- Province: Navarre
- Municipality: Baztan
- Elevation: 405 m (1,329 ft)

Population
  - Total: 184

Almandoz is a village located in the municipality of Baztan, Navarre, Spain. As of 2020, it has a population of 184.

== Geography ==
Almandoz is located 37 km (23 mi) north of Pamplona.

== Buildings ==
- Parish Church of San Pedro was inaugurated in 1956. It was built on the initiative of the neighbors because the old church located just 50 meters away had become too small and had numerous defects. The Romanesque doorway and an altarpiece were moved from the old temple, which is currently abandoned and in a state of ruin.
- Galtzaga Palace (Galtzaga Jauregia) is an 18th- century mansion converted into a hotel. It was built with ashlar stone and oak beams. The main façade features a carved stone coat of arms.
- Etxotoa House.
- Ederrena Fronton.
