= Cuevas, Asturias =

- Parish
- Location within Spain
- Country: Spain
- Autonomous community: Asturias
- Province: Asturias
- Municipality: Belmonte de Miranda

Cuevas is one of 15 parishes (administrative divisions) in Belmonte de Miranda, a municipality within the province and autonomous community of Asturias, in northern Spain.

It is 8.18 km^{2} (3.16 sq mi) in size with a population of 35 (INE 2004).

The village of Cuevas is about 17 kilometres from Belmonte, the capital of the council. It is located on the banks of the river of the same name, 520 metres above sea level and is accessed by the AS-227 road. It is interesting for its baroque altarpiece and some other ancient elements of relative importance. Cuevas is one of the villages with the largest number of well-preserved granaries and breadbaskets.

The Dominican priest José Álvarez Fernández was born in this parish. He arrived in the Peruvian Amazon jungle in 1917 and was known there as "Apaktone." He died in 1970 and is currently in the process of beatification.
