= Samartín d'Ondes =

- Parish
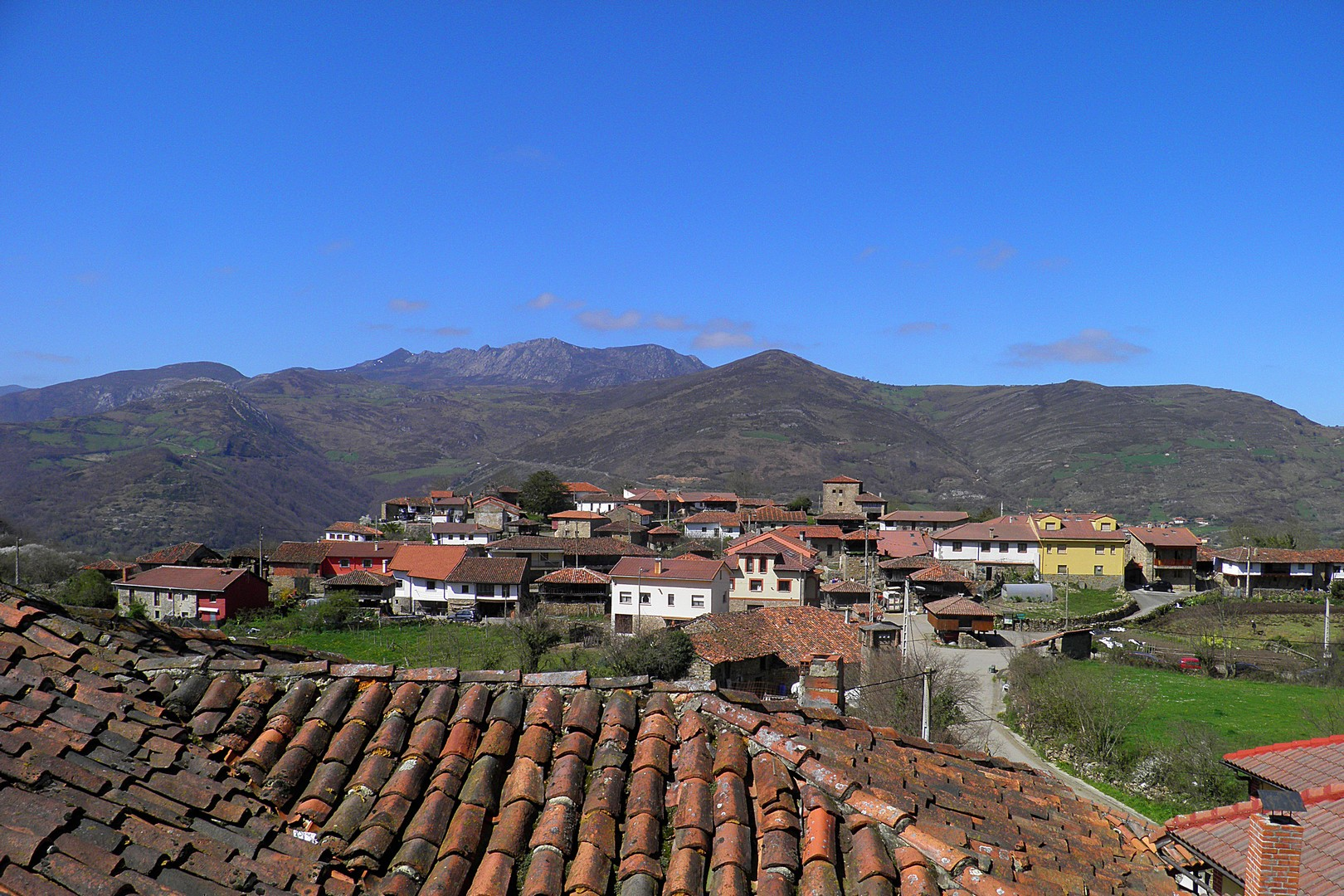

- Location within Spain
- Country: Spain
- Autonomous community: Asturias
- Province: Asturias
- Municipality: Belmonte de Miranda

Samartín d'Ondes is one of 15 parishes (administrative divisions) in Belmonte de Miranda, a municipality within the province and autonomous community of Asturias, in northern Spain.

It is 9.4 km^{2} (3.6 sq mi) in size with a population of 49 (INE 2005).
