= Selen Öndeş =

Turkish volleyball player (born 1988)

Selen Öndeş (born February 1, 1988, in Samsun) is a Turkish volleyball player. She is 186 cm. She has played for Fenerbahçe Women's Volleyball Team since 2006 and wears number 15. She played 6 times for the Turkish national team. She also played for Yalovaspor.

== See also ==
- Turkish women in sports
