= Belmonte, Asturias =

- Parish
- Location within Spain
- Country: Spain
- Autonomous community: Asturias
- Province: Asturias
- Municipality: Belmonte de Miranda

Belmonte is one of fifteen parishes (administrative divisions) in Belmonte de Miranda, a municipality of the same name, within the province and autonomous community of Asturias, in northern Spain. The village of Belmonte is the seat of the parish.

The parish is 32.52 km^{2} (12.56 sq mi) in size with a population of 644.

The village of Belmonte, with 416 inhabitants, is located about 200 meters above sea level, on both banks of the river Pigüeña, about 56 km (35 mi) from Oviedo, and is accessed via highway AS-227. The village offers famous catch-and-release trout fishing.
