= Onde-onde =

Onde-onde or onde onde may refer to:

- Klepon, a boiled rice cake stuffed with palm sugar
- Jin deui, a pastry made from rice flour covered in sesame seeds
