= Augüera =

- Parish
- Location within Spain
- Country: Spain
- Autonomous community: Asturias
- Province: Asturias
- Municipality: Belmonte de Miranda

Population
  - Total: 97

Augüera is one of 15 parishes (administrative divisions) in Belmonte de Miranda, a municipality within the province and autonomous community of Asturias, in northern Spain. Its name comes from the Asturian word "agüeru", which means a pool or irrigation channel. This name is also applied to the valley, where several streams converge.

Agüera is 10 km from Belmonte, on the left-hand bank of the river Pigüeña, 340m above sea level. It can be reached by highway AS-227. It is 29.3 km^{2} (11.3 sq mi) in size with a population of 97 (INE 2011) divided between the villages of Augüera, Augüerina, L'Arena, Los Bazales, La Bedul, La Casa Blanca, La Casa'l Sol, Castañera, Cigüedres, La Ferreiría, Pumadín, Quintanal, Rozos, Saisteban and Viḷḷare.

The T-shaped parish church is from the 18th century, and is dedicated to San Andrés. The parish's main festival is the feast of San Fructuoso, in July.
