= Elizondo, Navarre =

Elizondo
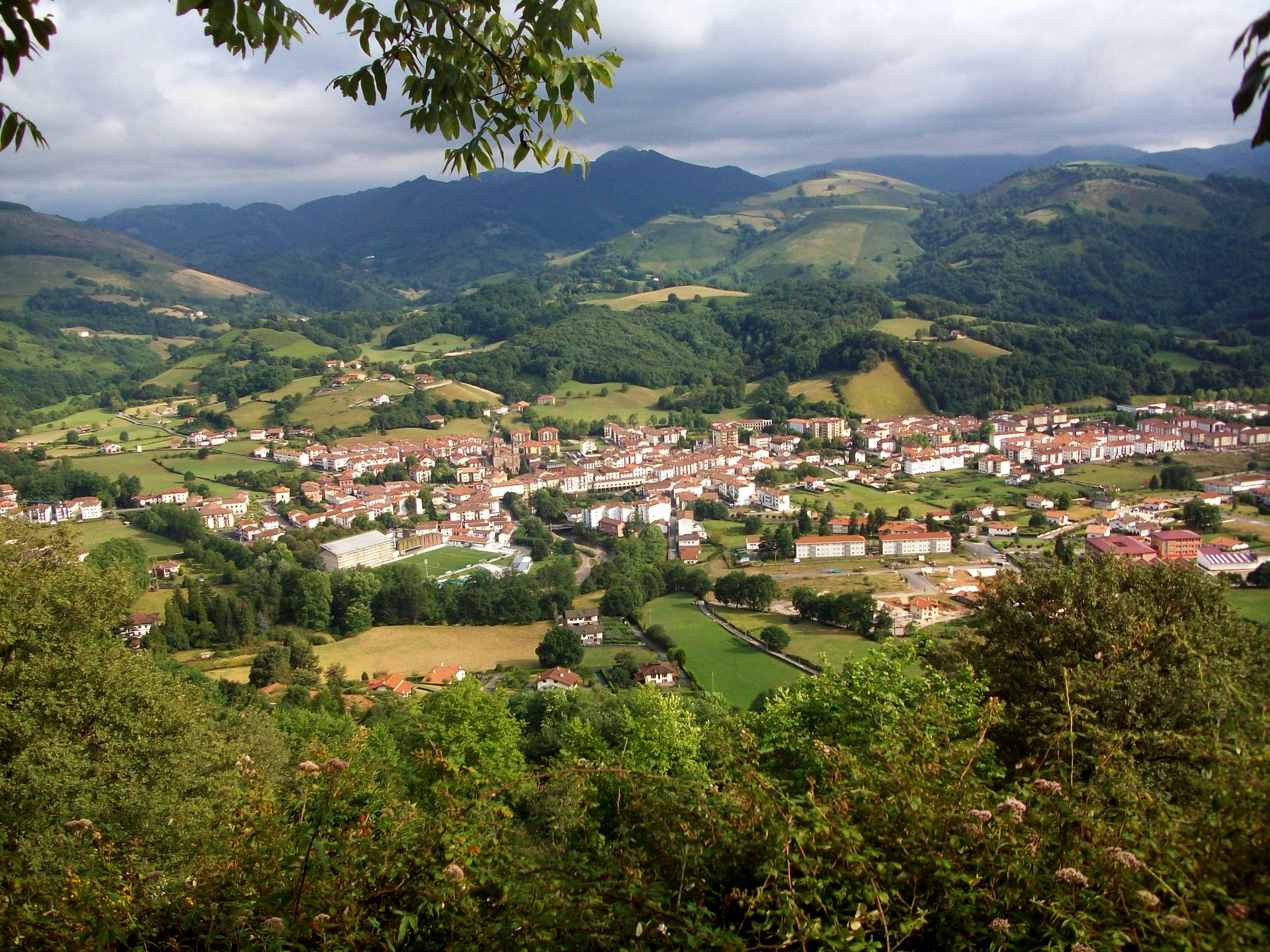
- View of Elizondo in the Baztan valley

- Seal

- Location of Elizondo within Spain Elizondo (Spain)
- Coordinates: 43°8′49″N 1°31′2″W
- Country: Spain
- Autonomous community: Navarre
- Province: Navarre
- Comarca/Eskualdea: Baztan
- Municipality: Baztan
- Elevation: 200 m (660 ft)

Population (2009)
  - Total: 3,563
- Time zone: UTC+1 (GMT)
  - Summer (DST): UTC+2 (GMT)

Elizondo is a town located in the province and autonomous community of Navarre, northern Spain. It is located on both banks of the Baztan River. The town is the capital of the Baztan valley and it is where most service establishments are concentrated. Elizondo is one of fifteen settlements in the valley. It is home to the Valley House which houses the City Council and the General Assembly of Baztan. It comprises the districts Anzamborda, Berro, Etxaide, and Beartzun.

== History ==
The Baztan valley has a recorded history dating back at least to 1025. During the War of the Pyrenees in late July 1794, the Battle of the Baztan Valley took place in the area. In 1813, British General William Stewart set up his headquarters in Elizondo during the Battle of the Pyrenees.
