= Vigaña (Belmonte) =

- Parish
- Location within Spain
- Country: Spain
- Autonomous community: Asturias
- Province: Asturias
- Municipality: Belmonte de Miranda

Population (2011)
  - Total: 32

Vigaña is one of 15 parishes in Belmonte de Miranda, a municipality within the province and autonomous community of Asturias, in northern Spain.

It is 6.36 km^{2} (2.46 sq mi) in size with a population of 32 (INE 2011).
