= Onde, Vikramgad =

Village in Maharashtra

Onde
- village
- Location in Maharashtra, India Onde (India)
- Coordinates: 19.7741746°N 73.0903311°E
- Country: India
- State: Maharashtra
- District: Palghar
- Taluka: Vikramgad
- Elevation: 57 m (187 ft)

Population (2011)
  - Total: 1,321
- Time zone: UTC+5:30 (IST)
- 2011 census code: 551803

Onde is a village in the Palghar district of Maharashtra, India. It is located in the Vikramgad taluka.

== Demographics ==
According to the 2011 census of India, Onde has 304 households. The effective literacy rate (i.e. the literacy rate of population excluding children aged 6 and below) is 59.56%.

Demographics (2011 Census)
	Total	Male	Female
Population	1321	619	702
Children aged below 6 years	191	88	103
Scheduled caste	0	0	0
Scheduled tribe	995	470	525
Literates	673	360	313
Workers (all)	757	359	398
Main workers (total)	745	355	390
Main workers: Cultivators	196	98	98
Main workers: Agricultural labourers	347	152	195
Main workers: Household industry workers	8	5	3
Main workers: Other	194	100	94
Marginal workers (total)	12	4	8
Marginal workers: Cultivators	2	0	2
Marginal workers: Agricultural labourers	2	1	1
Marginal workers: Household industry workers	0	0	0
Marginal workers: Others	8	3	5
Non-workers	564	260	304
