= Baztan (river) =

River in Spain

Baztan Baztán
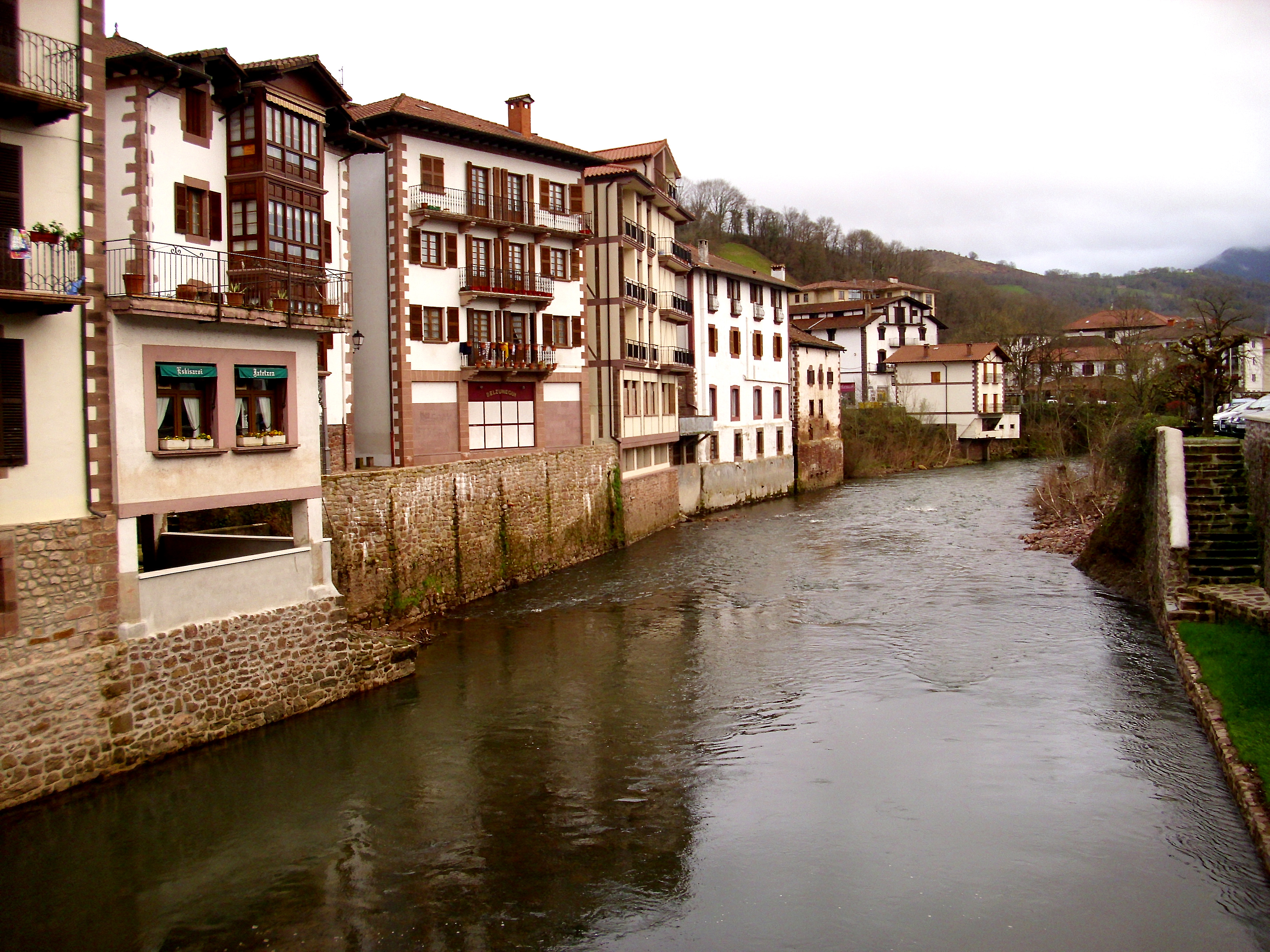
- The Baztan in Elizondo

Location
- Country: Spain
- Region: Navarre

Physical characteristics
- Source: Izpegi & Iztauz
  - location: Erratzu, Spain
- Mouth: Bidasoa
  - location: Oronoz-Mugairi
  - coordinates: 43°08′16″N 1°36′44″W

The Baztan (Basque: Baztan, Spanish: Baztán) is a river in northern Spain. It is the main, right headwater of the river Bidasoa. Downstream from the confluence with the river Marin at Oronoz-Mugairi, it is called Bidasoa.
