= Belmonte de Miranda =

Belmonte de Miranda Miranda
- Municipality
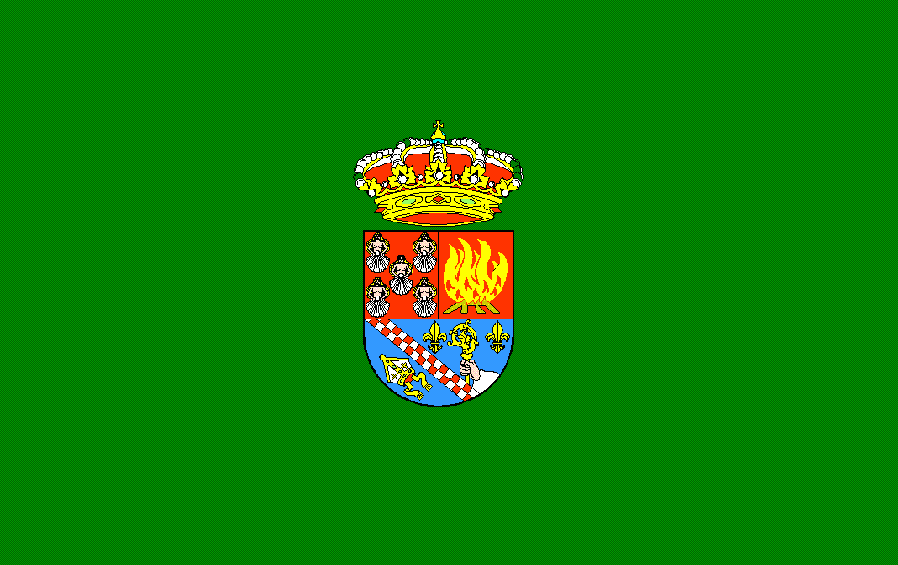
- Flag Coat of arms

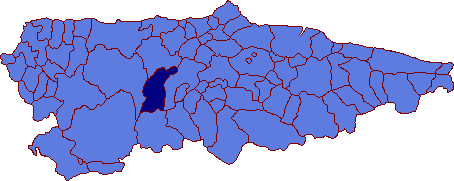

- Location in Spain
- Coordinates: 43°17′N 6°14′W
- Country: Spain
- Autonomous community: Asturias
- Province: Asturias
- Comarca: Oviedo
- Judicial district: Grado
- Capital: Belmonte

Government
  - Alcalde: Roberto Pérez López (PSOE)

Area
  - Total: 208.01 km^{2} (80.31 sq mi)
- Highest elevation: 1,527 m (5,010 ft)

Population (2025-01-01)
  - Total: 1,366
  - Density: 6.567/km^{2} (17.01/sq mi)
- Demonym: belmontino/a
- Time zone: UTC+1 (CET)
  - Summer (DST): UTC+2 (CEST)
- Postal code: 33830
- Website: www.belmontedemiranda.com

Belmonte de Miranda (Asturian: Miranda) is a municipality in the Autonomous Community of the Principality of Asturias, Spain. It is bordered on the north by Salas, on the east by Grado, to the south by Somiedo and Teverga, and on the west by Tineo.

== Geography ==
The municipality is crossed from south to north by the basin of the river Pigüeña, a trout-rich tributary of the Narcea, the river which forms the northern border with Salas, and which is usually fished for salmon.

The southeast part of the municipality forms part of the Somiedo Natural Park. In it are a great variety of native forest species: oaks, chestnuts, and so forth. Here the fauna is varied and abundant, including wolves, foxes, badgers, roe deer, boars, and brown bear.

== Demography ==
The inhabitants of the municipality are in 66 principal villages divided into 15 parishes, the largest of which is Belmonte, with 32.1 km^{2}.

Like many of the municipalities in the mountains of Asturias, Belmonte de Miranda is losing population. At the turn of the twentieth century, it numbered over 7000. Emigration was a major cause of population decline, especially in the 1940s. In the final decades of the twentieth century, the population of the capital seems to have become fixed at around 800.

== Economy ==
Agriculture is the most developed economic activity in the region. It is done on small ranches and many of the ranchers are of advanced age, which endangers the future of the enterprise. In the industrial sector, the most notable company is Río Narcea Gold Mines. Nearly a third of the population works in the service sector, especially in the burgeoning hospitality businesses.

== Famous people ==
- P. José Alvarez Fernandez O.P. (May 16, 1890 – October 19, 1970), Dominican missionary, active in the Amazon for 53 years, until his death in Lima.
- Alvaro de Cienfuegos y Sierra (February 27, 1657 – August 19, 1739), cardinal and archbishop of Rome.
- Xose Alvarez Fernandez Pin (1948-), Asturian writer, known for his works El bable de Xuanín ia outrus cuentus (1980) and Fíos de nadie (1981).
- Ángeles Villarta, writer, journalist, and director
- Celso Alvarez Alvarez, forensic doctor, ex-director of the Service of Internal Medicine at the Hospital Covadonga and the Hospital Central de Asturias in Oviedo.

== Parishes ==
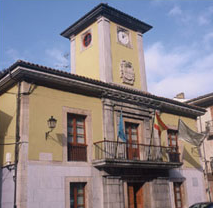
The government building.

- Almurfe
- Augüera
- Bixega
- Belmonte
- Castañéu
- Cuevas
- Las Estacas
- Ḷḷamosu
- Lleiguarda
- Montoubu
- Quintana
- San Bartolomé
- Samartín de Llodón
- Samartín d'Ondes
- Vigaña

== See also ==
- List of municipalities in Asturias
