= Izpegi Pass =

French mountain pass

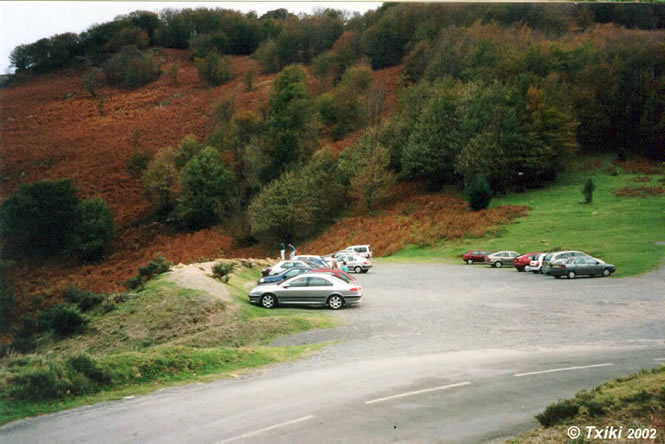
- Car-park at the top of the Izpegi Pass

- Location within France
- Elevation: 672 metres (2,205 ft)
- Traversed by: road

Third Approach
- Location: France–Spain border
- Range: Pyrenees
- Coordinates: 43°10′32″N 1°24′8″W

The Izpegi Pass (French: Col d'Ispeguy, Basque: Izpegiko Lepoa, Spanish: Puerto de Izpegui) is a 672 m high Pyrenean mountain pass located right on the border between Spain and France, linking the Baztan and Baigorri valleys in the Basque Country. The river Bidasoa, known as Baztan in its upper course, rises close by on the western side of the Iparla mountain range stretching out north to south. The name Izpegi applies also to a stream running on its eastern slopes.

The population centers closest to the saddle are the village of Erratzu (west) and Saint-Étienne-de-Baïgorry (east, Baigorri in Basque). A sinuous narrow road that bears witness to a couple of Tour de France stages descends east to Saint-Étienne-de-Baïgorry, cutting its way through a spectacular grassy and dramatic landscape.

The pass is frequented by hikers in order to gain access to the neighbouring mountain Hautza (1,306 m / 4,285 ft, waymarking all along) and other mounts of the ridgeline (Mount Iparla). Since the mid-2000s, a modest txalaparta festival is held at the spot on the first Sunday of September, which has become a meeting point for the instrument's players, especially locals. Money raised from the food stall in 2009 was intended to help the Basque language school of the neighbouring small town of Baigorri.

== History ==
A battle was fought at this location during the War of the Pyrenees on 3 June 1794. A 2,300-strong republican French brigade led by General of Brigade Lavictoire attacked the 1,000 Spanish and French royalist troops and drove them from the pass. The defenders, one battalion of the Spanish Zamora Infantry Regiment, three companies of the Aldudes Rifles, and the Légion Royal French Émigré battalion, lost 94 killed and wounded, plus 307 captured. The French brigade, part of Jean Mauco's division of the Army of the western Pyrenees, suffered an unknown number of casualties.

== Sources ==
- Smith, Digby. The Napoleonic Wars Data Book. London: Greenhill, 1998. ISBN 1-85367-276-9
