= Baztan (comarca) =

Coordinates: 43.2000°N 1.4667°W

Baztan Baztanaldea
- Eskualdea / Comarca
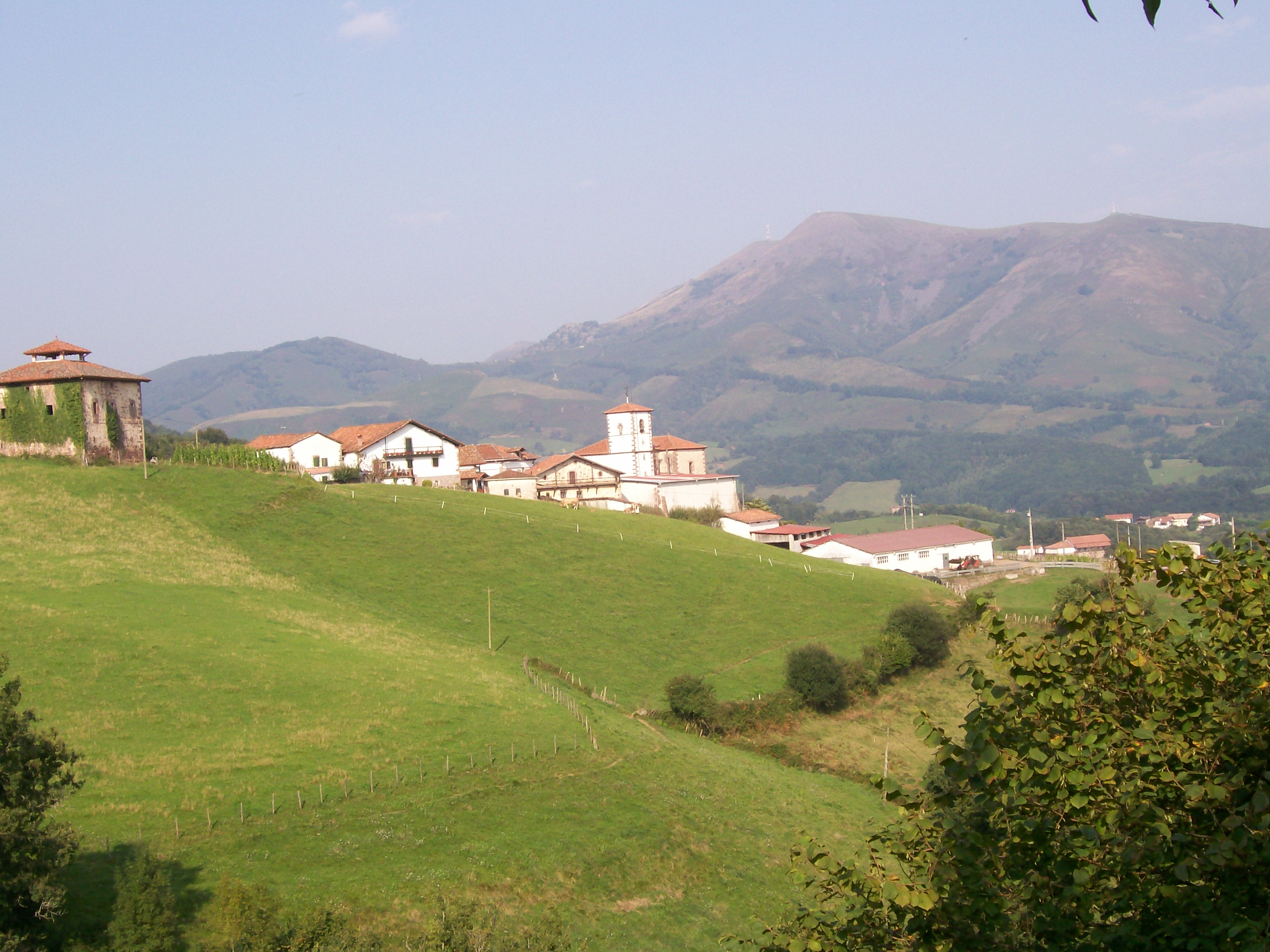
- View of the Baztan comarca

- Country: Spain
- Autonomous community: Navarre
- Capital: Elizondo
- Municipalities: List: See text

Area
  - Total: 390 km^{2} (150 sq mi)

Population (2019)
  - Total: 8,345
  - Density: 21/km^{2} (55/sq mi)
- Time zone: UTC+1 (CET)
  - Summer (DST): UTC+2 (CEST)

Baztan (Basque: Baztanaldea) is a rural comarca located in a wide valley in Navarre, Spain, with the Baztan river running through it. Down the valley, the river is one of two forming the Bidasoa, on the Atlantic basin. The valley belongs to the Merindad de Pamplona, a historic administrative unit of Navarre.

The valley provides the access to the French Basque regions of Lapurdi and Lower Navarre by means of the Izpegi Pass and Dantxarinea.

== History ==
Early in the 15th century the Baztan people earned their freedom from nobility as a consequence of their legendary bravery in the battle of Las Navas de Tolosa. This gave them a right to self-rule, with several important consequences: It strengthened territorial organization and helped demographic balance by preventing migration into a valley with limited resources, the major exception being the Agotes (cf. the Cagots). As in many other Basque areas, the inhabitants of Baztan were considered yeomen (nobles) universally, and some Baztan inhabitants made a fortune at the Court in Madrid and in America.

On 19 July 1522, the castle of Amaiur was the scene of one of the final battles for the Kingdom of Navarre´s independence. Exhausted and starving, the remaining 200 Basque knights finally surrendered to forces who vastly outnumbered them (circa 6,000 infantry), led by the Count of Miranda and loyal to the new emperor Charles V. One of the knights resisting in Amaiur was a brother of Francis Xavier, patron saint of Navarre and of Baztan blood. The castle was reconstructed in the decades following the Castilian-Spanish conquest of Navarre, but was ultimately abandoned and dismantled. Its ruins and ramparts are now exposed after being unearthed by an archaeological survey (Society Aranzadi) financed by popular subscription.

Nearly a century later, villagers from Zugarramurdi were denounced by the abbot of Urdax as witches, which prompted a famous witch trial by the Inquisition at its nearest court, Logrono, an event that Zugarramurdi commemorates annually with bonfires during the summer solstice, as well as with a museum.

The valley bore witness to the War of the Pyrenees, the Peninsular War as well as the Carlist wars, and up until the end of the 20th century served as a vital back-door entrance into France used by pilgrims, refugees, allied airmen and smugglers. The latter contributed greatly to the local economy.

Significant emigration from the valley to Latin America took place. The Errázuriz family in Chile traces its roots back to the Baztán Valley.

== Municipalities ==
The comarca consists of just three municipalities, with the largest by far being the municipality of Baztan. They are listed below with their populations at recent censuses, together with the most recent official estimate:

Name	Population Census 2001	Population Census 2011	Population Estimate 2019
Baztan	7,501	7,958	7,777
Urdax	388	379	349
Zugarramurdi	245	241	219
Totals	8,134	8,578	8,345

There are 15 villages in the municipalities: Elizondo, Oronoz-Mugaire, Arraioz, Almandoz, Berroeta, Aniz, Ziga, Irurita, Lecaroz, Garzain, Elbetea, Arizkun, Erratzu, Azpilicueta, and Amaiur.

== See also ==
- Category:People from Baztán (comarca)
- Baztan, Navarre
- Comarcas of Navarra
- Merindad de Tudela
- Zozaia
