= Comarcas of Navarre =

The Chartered Community of Navarre is divided in 12 regions —named eskualdeak in basque and comarcas in Spanish—, which are juridical figures constituted as local administrative divisions designed to provide local proximity services. They follow the ancient divisions of the Kingdom of Navarre, which include figures such as the merindade or the almiradio. Currently, Navarre is divided into 12 eskualdeak/comarcas(regions) and 4 azpieskualdeak/subcomarcas (subregions) since the 04/2019 Foral Law approved by the Barkos government on 2019. However, the process of dissolution of the old entities and creation of the new ones was stopped by the following Chivite government, making it today still unachieved, even though the eskualdeak/comarcas exist officially.

== 2019-today ==
The actual distribution was approved by Barkos government via 04/2019 Foral Law, dividing Navarre in 12 eskualdeak/comarcas and 4 azpieskualdeak/subcomarcas:

Map

Legend

Baztan-Bidasoa
Erdialdea/Zona Media
Erribera/Ribera
Erriberagoiena/Ribera Alta
Estellerria/Tierra Estella
Montejurra
Estellerriko Erribera/Ribera Estellesa
Iruñerria/Comarca de Pamplona
Metropolialdea/Área Metropolitana
Ibarrak/Valles
Izarbeibar-Novenera/Valdizarbe-Novenera
Larraun-Leitzaldea
Pirinioak/Pirineos
Pirinioaurrea/Prepirineo
Sakana
Zangozerria/Comarca de Sangüesa

== 2000-2019 ==
Bortziriak
Baztanaldea
Tudela
Malerreka
Sakana
Aralarraldea
Ultzamaldea
Agoitzaldea/Aoiz
Irunberrialdea/Lumbier
Auñamendi
Iruñerria/Cuenca de Pamplona
Garesaldea
Estella Oriental
Estella Occidental
Zangozerria/Sangüesa
Tafallaldea
Ribera del Alto Ebro
Ribera Arga-Aragón
Erronkari-Zaraitzu

Until 2019, the division was made following Zonificación Navarra 2000, approved in 2000, which looked like the following:

Divisions approved in 2000
