= Battle of the Pyrenees =

1813 battle of the Peninsular War

- Part of the Peninsular War
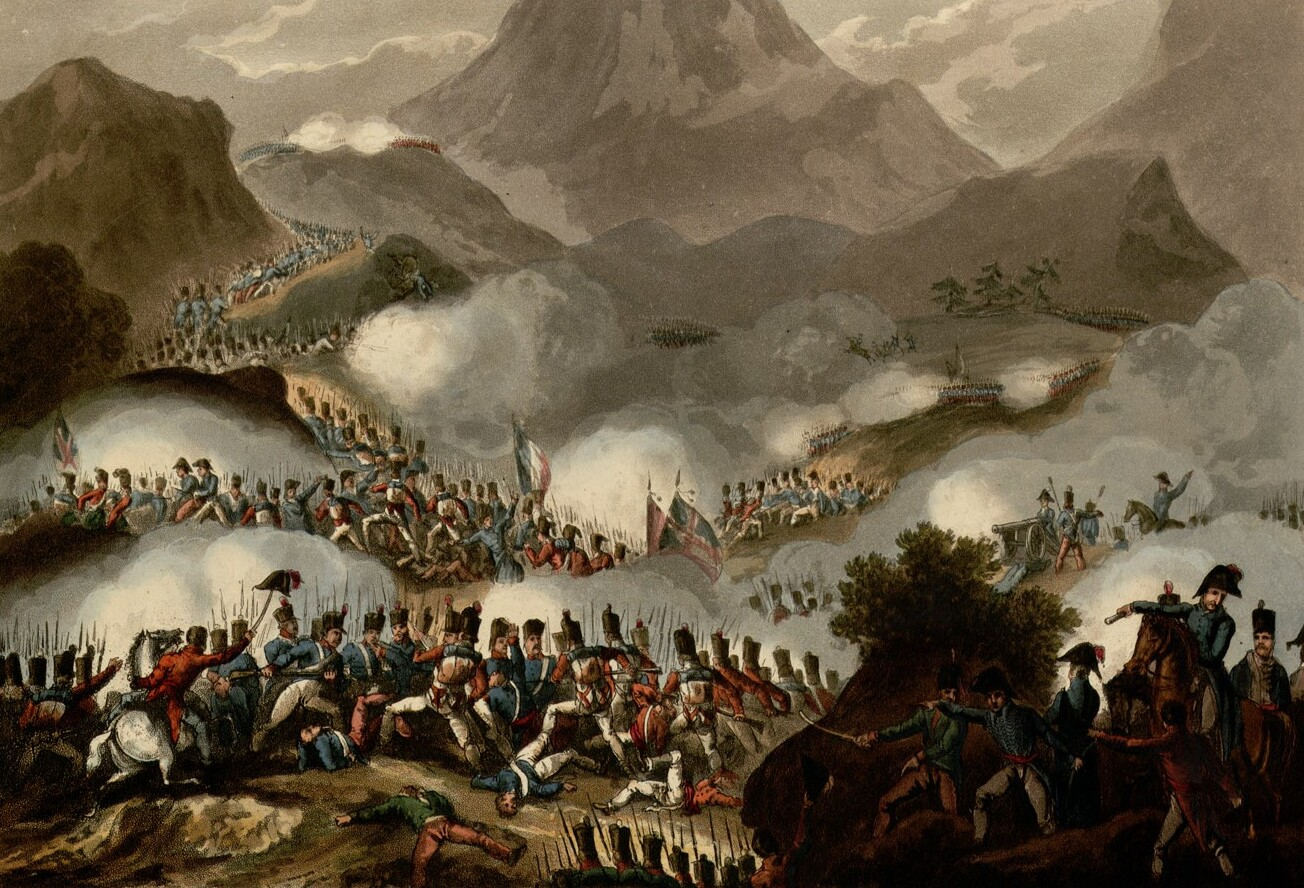
- 1814–1815 engraving of the battle
| Date | 25 July – 2 August 1813 |
| Location | North Pyrenees, Spain 43°2′48″N 1°36′48″W |
| Result | Coalition victory |

Belligerents
| United Kingdom; Portugal; Spain | France |

Commanders and leaders
| (United Kingdom of Great Britain and Ireland) Marquess of Wellington; (Spain) Francisco de Longa | (First French Empire) Jean-de-Dieu Soult |

Strength
| 55,000–62,000 | 60,000–79,000 |

Casualties and losses
| 7,000 killed, wounded or captured | 1,313 killed 8,582 wounded 2,702 captured |

Peninsular War
Vitoria and the Pyrenees, 1813–1814
current battle

The Battle of the Pyrenees was a large-scale offensive (the author David Chandler recognises the 'battle' as an offensive) launched on 25 July 1813 by Marshal Jean-de-Dieu Soult from the Pyrénées region on Emperor Napoleon's order, in the hope of relieving French garrisons under siege at Pamplona and San Sebastián. After initial success the offensive ground to a halt in the face of increased allied resistance under the command of Arthur Wellesley, Marquess of Wellington. Soult abandoned the offensive on 30 July and headed toward France, having failed to relieve either garrison.

Soult was given command of an army made up mostly of fresh conscripts and began his offensive, although lacking supplies. (Note: Jean-de-Dieu Soult § Military capability) The Battle of the Pyrenees involved several distinct actions. On 25 July, Soult and two French corps fought the reinforced British 4th Division and a Spanish division at the Battle of Roncesvalles. The Allied force successfully held off all attacks during the day, but retreated from the Roncesvalles Pass that night in the face of overwhelming French numerical superiority. Also on the 25th, a third French corps severely tried the British 2nd Division at the Battle of Maya. The British withdrew from the Maya Pass that evening. Wellington rallied his troops a short distance north of Pamplona and repelled the attacks of Soult's two corps at the Battle of Sorauren on 28 July.

Instead of falling back to the northeast toward Roncesvalles Pass, Soult made contact with his third corps on 29 July and began to move north. On 30 July, Wellington attacked Soult's rearguards at Sorauren, driving some French troops to the northeast, while most continued to the north. Rather than use the Maya Pass, Soult elected to head north up the Bidassoa River valley. He managed to evade Allied attempts to surround his troops at Yanci on 1 August and escaped across a nearby pass after a final rearguard action at Etxalar on 2 August. The French suffered nearly twice as many casualties as the Allied army.

== Background ==
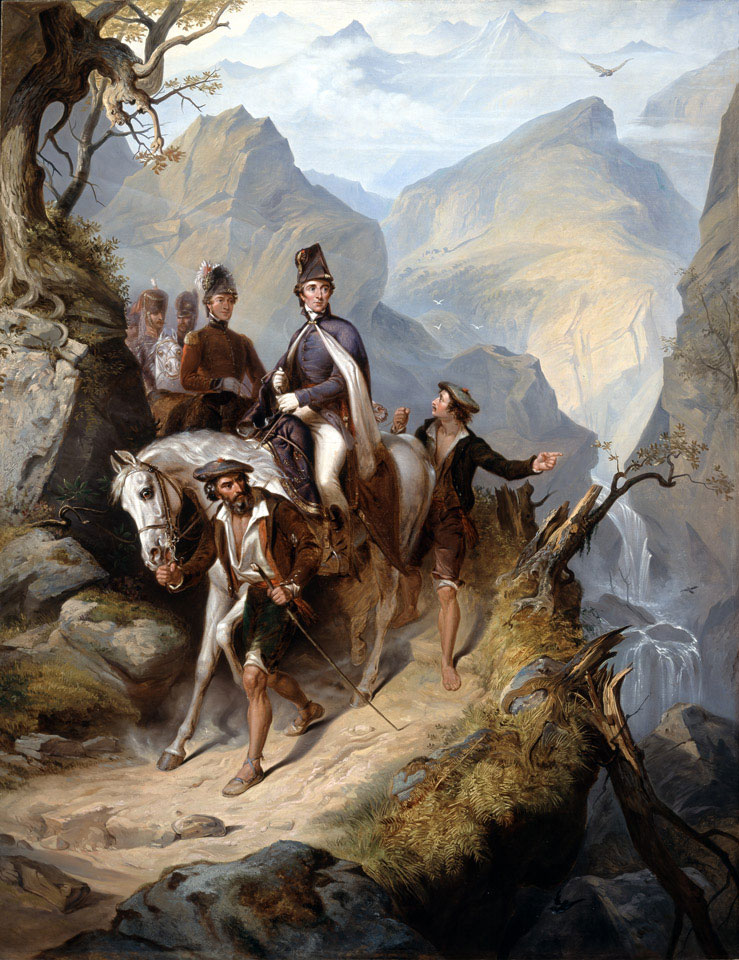
1853 painting of Wellington being led through the Pyrenees

After the decisive French defeat at the Battle of Vitoria, Marshal Soult consolidated the remnants of four armies into a single force of 80,000 troops. Soult ordered General of Division Jean-Baptiste Drouet, Comte d'Erlon commanding one corps of 21,000 men to attack and secure the Maya Pass. General of Division Honoré Reille was ordered by Soult to attack and seize the Roncesvalles Pass with his corps and the corps of General of Division Bertrand Clausel of 40,000 men. Marshal Soult's plan was to relieve the siege at Pamplona first, then swing the army westward to relieve the siege at San Sebastián.

== Forces ==
Clausel's Lieutenancy (army corps) of the Left consisted of the infantry divisions of Generals of Division Nicolas François Conroux, Edmé-Martin Vandermaesen, and Eloi Charlemagne Taupin. Conroux's 4th Division had 7,056 men in nine battalions; Vandermaesen's 5th Division counted 4,181 troops in seven battalions; Taupin's 8th Division numbered 5,981 infantry in nine battalions. D'Erlon's Lieutenancy of the Center included the infantry divisions of Generals of Division Jean Barthélemy Darmagnac, Louis Jean Nicolas Abbé, and Jean-Pierre Maransin. Darmagnac's 2nd Division counted 6,961 troops in eight battalions; Abbé's 3rd Division was made up of 8,030 soldiers in nine battalions; Maransin's 6th Division had 5,966 men in seven battalions. Reille's Lieutenancy of the Right had the divisions of Generals of Division Maximilien Sebastien Foy, Antoine Louis Popon de Maucune, and Thomas Mignot de Lamartinière. Foy's 1st Division numbered 5,922 soldiers in nine battalions; Maucune's 7th Division had 4,186 infantry in seven battalions; Lamartinière's 9th Division comprised 7,127 troops in 10 battalions.

Each Corps had a single cavalry regiment attached for scouting purposes, for a total of 808 horsemen. The French Reserve under General of Division Eugene-Casimir Villatte held the defences on the lower Bidassoa River near the Bay of Biscay. The reserves numbered 9,102 French troops in 14 battalions, 2,066 Germans in four battalions, 1,349 Italians in three battalions, 1,168 Spanish in three battalions, 1,550 French National Guards, and 2,019 King's Guards in three battalions, the last being the remnant of Joseph Bonaparte's bodyguard. In addition, General of Division Pierre Benoît Soult commanded 3,981 light cavalrymen in 10 regiments and General of Division Anne-François-Charles Trelliard led 2,358 dragoons in six regiments. The two cavalry divisions remained in the rear. There were about 7,900 gunners, sappers, wagon drivers, and other troops. General of Brigade Louis Emmanuel Rey and 3,000 troops garrisoned San Sebastián while General of Brigade Louis Pierre Jean Cassan held Pamplona with a 3,500-man garrison. At Bayonne were 5,595 French conscripts. Altogether, Soult had 99,906 troops under his orders. Of this total he used 63,572 men in his offensive.

Wellington defended the line of the western Pyrenees with a covering force of 62,000 men. These faced to the northeast, with the left anchored on the Bay of Biscay at the mouth of the Bidassoa River. From left to right, he deployed the following infantry divisions: Major General Kenneth Howard's 1st on the coast, Major General Charles Alten's Light at Lesaka, Lieutenant General George Ramsay, 9th Earl of Dalhousie's 7th at Etxalar, Lieutenant General William Stewart's 2nd at the Maya Pass and Elizondo, Major General Francisco Silveira, Count of Amarante's Portuguese near Izpegi Pass, Lieutenant General Lowry Cole's 4th at Roncevaux Pass and Major General Pablo Morillo's Spanish also at Roncevaux. In reserve were Major General Denis Pack's 6th Division at Doneztebe, and Lieutenant General Thomas Picton's 3rd Division at Olague, plus other Portuguese and Spanish units. Cavalry being of little value in the mountains, Wellington stationed most of his far to the rear, except for two light dragoon brigades.

The Siege of San Sebastián was conducted by Major General James Leith's 5th Division and other units under the direction of Lieutenant General Thomas Graham. Pamplona was besieged by General Henry O'Donnell, 1st Count of la Bisbal's Spanish division and other units.

== Battle ==
=== Maya and Roncesvalles ===
The surprise offensive opened on 25 July 1813. The passes of Maya (north of Pamplona) and Roncesvaux (northeast of Pamplona) were both weakly held by the allies spread over a 50-mile front from Pamplona to the sea. After breaking through the Maya Pass, d'Erlon was to move southwest through the Baztan valley to seize the Pass of Velate at 43°2′48″N 1°36′48″W, north of Pamplona. After storming Roncesvaux Pass, Clausel and Reille were instructed to march southwest toward Pamplona. Soult had trouble securing rations for his soldiers, so he launched his offensive with only four days' rations.

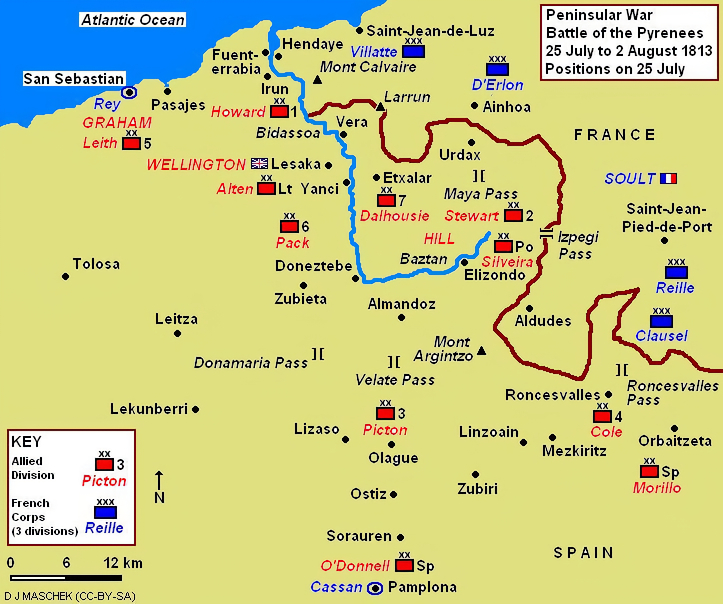
Battle of the Pyrenees, 25 July 1813

The responsibility for Maya Pass lay with Stewart's 2nd Division. That morning, Stewart decided that the French would not attack, left the brigades of Major General William Pringle and Lieutenant Colonel John Cameron in the valley and rode to Elizondo, ten miles to the south. Some French soldiers were seen and light companies were sent up in support of the picket. When the French attacked in force, the British forces in the valley had to climb to the pass in full kit. By the time they got up, the picket force was wiped out and 10,000 of d'Erlon's men occupied the pass. In the Battle of Maya, Pringle opposed Darmagnac's division, while Cameron faced the rest of the French corps. The 4,000 British tried manfully to retake the pass, but they were unable to do so. On the other hand, the narrowness of the defile helped the British to hold off d'Erlon's immensely superior force. When Stewart returned at 2:00 pm, he pulled the redcoats back to a second position. By 3:00 pm, the British were on the verge of disaster. At this point, Major General Edward Barnes's brigade of Dalhousie's 7th Division arrived from the west to strike d'Erlon in the flank and the battle died down. The British lost 1,610 men and four cannons out of 6,000, while French losses numbered 2,100 out of 20,900. That evening, Lieutenant General Rowland Hill authorized a retreat to Elizondo. D'Erlon worried about Barnes's incursion and pursued very cautiously the next day. He only advanced six miles on the 26th.

Cole held Roncesvalles Pass with his 4th Division, Morillo's Spanish Division and Major General John Byng's brigade of the 2nd Division, a total of 11,000 men. From 6:00 to 9:00 am, Byng's brigade took the brunt of Clausel's assault in the Battle of Roncesvalles, while Cole rushed up reinforcements. Cole fended off the French until 5:00 pm when thick fog rolled in. The Allies lost 350 men while French casualties were about 530. Troubled by a small French probe of his right flank and fearful that 36,000 Frenchmen would swamp him from out of the mist, Cole quit the area and retreated toward Pamplona, though he had been ordered to hold the pass "to the utmost". A worse mistake in Wellington's eyes was Cole's failure to report his actions in a timely manner. When Picton appeared with his 6,000-man 3rd Division, Cole convinced him to retreat also.

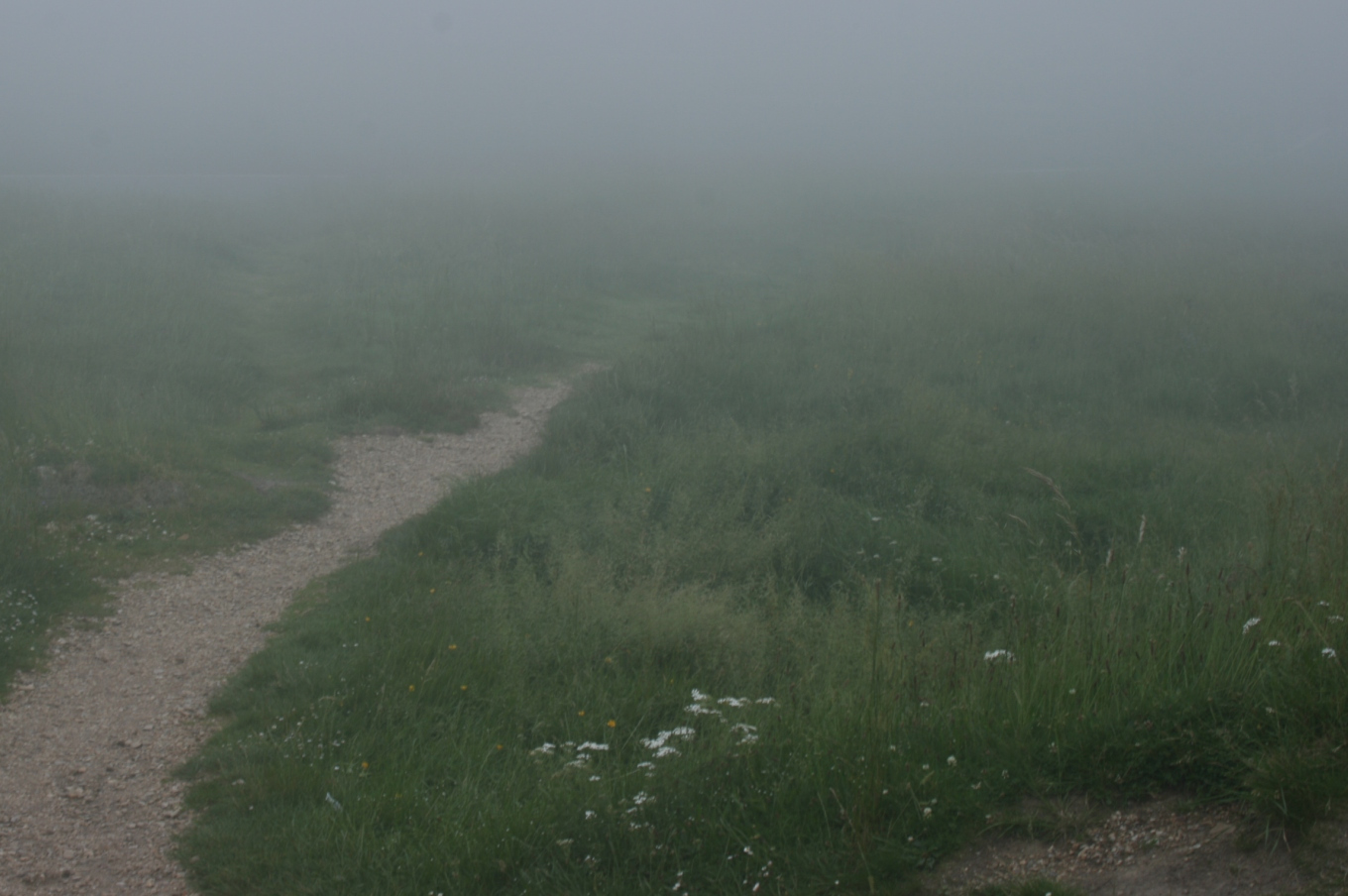
Fog at Roncesvalles

Because of the fog, the French did not realise that the British had decamped until the next morning. Clausel pursued, but did not come into contact with Cole's rear guard until late in the afternoon. Meanwhile, Reille's corps attempted to use an alternate path across the mountains and wound up marching in a circle. A push on 27 July from Roncesvalles Pass by troops personally commanded by Marshal Soult, got within 10 miles of Pamplona. Note that this is disputed. However, Picton's British and Portuguese forces made a stand on an excellent defensive position near the village of Sorauren, just north of Pamplona.

Believing d'Erlon's corps to be the main French attack and receiving no information from Cole, Wellington spent 26 July setting up his defences in the direction of Maya Pass. Leaving Hill in charge at Elizondo, he then rode toward Pamplona on 27 July to find out what was happening. He ordered Pack's 6th Division to join Cole and Picton.

=== Sorauren and Soult's retreat ===
The Battle of the Pyrenees by John Singleton Copley, 1814

On 27 July, Wellington joined the 17,000 British and Portuguese troops at Sorauren. To Clausel's intense frustration, Soult decided to wait for Reille's tardy corps to arrive and even took a nap. The next day, in the Battle of Sorauren, Soult's 36,000 men unsuccessfully attacked the 24,000 Allied troops in front of Pamplona. The Allies lost 2,652 casualties while French losses were probably heavier. Hill's corps, blocking d'Erlon, was pulled back by Wellington toward Sorauren. But d'Erlon was never able to reach Sorauren to help Soult. Instead, when d'Erlon's cavalry made contact with Soult on the morning of 29 July, Soult decided to move to the north rather than retreat northeast toward Roncesvalles. As 30 July dawned, Soult's men could be seen retreating east to west across the British front. Now reinforced by his 7th Division, Wellington ordered an attack.

The French clung to Sorauren village in a bitter fight before being driven away. The British reported 538 casualties while French losses were much heavier. Cut off by the sudden British offensive, Foy's division at the east end of the French line retreated by way of Roncesvalles Pass to the northeast. Foy was joined by elements of Reille's and Clausel's commands so that he took as many as 12,000 men with him. Meanwhile, d'Erlon led the rest of the French army in a retreat to the north, pushing back Hill's forces back just enough to get through. On 30 July at Beunza, Abbé's division of d'Erlon suffered 750 casualties, while the Allies suffered 1,056: 156 British and 900 Portuguese.

Instead of retreating over Maya Pass as Wellington expected, Soult marched north up the Bidassoa River valley. At Yanci, part of Major General Francisco de Longa's Spanish division blocked a key bridge. For two hours, without support from the rest of their division, a battalion of the 2nd Asturias Regiment held off d'Erlon's entire corps. Finally, five French battalions stormed the bridge and Soult's defeated army crossed over it. Too late to block the retreat, Alten's Light Division arrived from Leitza and fired into the gorge from above, causing chaos in the French column. His starving army fast disintegrating into a mob, Soult swung northeast through Etxalar (Echelar) and reached the French frontier via the Col de Lizarrieta at 43°15′39″N 1°37′8″W on 2 August. On that day, elements of Conroux's and Lamartinière's divisions fought a rearguard action at Etxalar against Major General Robert Ross' brigade of Cole's division, Barnes' brigade, and the 95th Rifles. The French suffered about 300 casualties, while inflicting a loss of 368 killed, wounded, and missing on their pursuers. Meanwhile, over 1,000 French wounded were abandoned and captured by the Allies.

== Conclusion ==
Soult failed to relieve the sieges at San Sebastian and Pamplona, suffered about 13,000 casualties, and had to withdraw to French soil weakened and demoralised. Soult's army lost 1,313 killed, 8,582 wounded, and 2,702 captured. Out of 1,318 French officers, 423 became casualties. Wellington's total losses for the campaign were 7,000. The next action was the Battle of San Marcial at the end of August.

== Notes ==
| Preceded by Siege of San Sebastián | Napoleonic Wars; Battle of the Pyrenees | Succeeded by Battle of Sorauren |
