= Battle of Maya =

1813 battle of the Peninsular War

- Part of the Battle of the Pyrenees during the Peninsular War
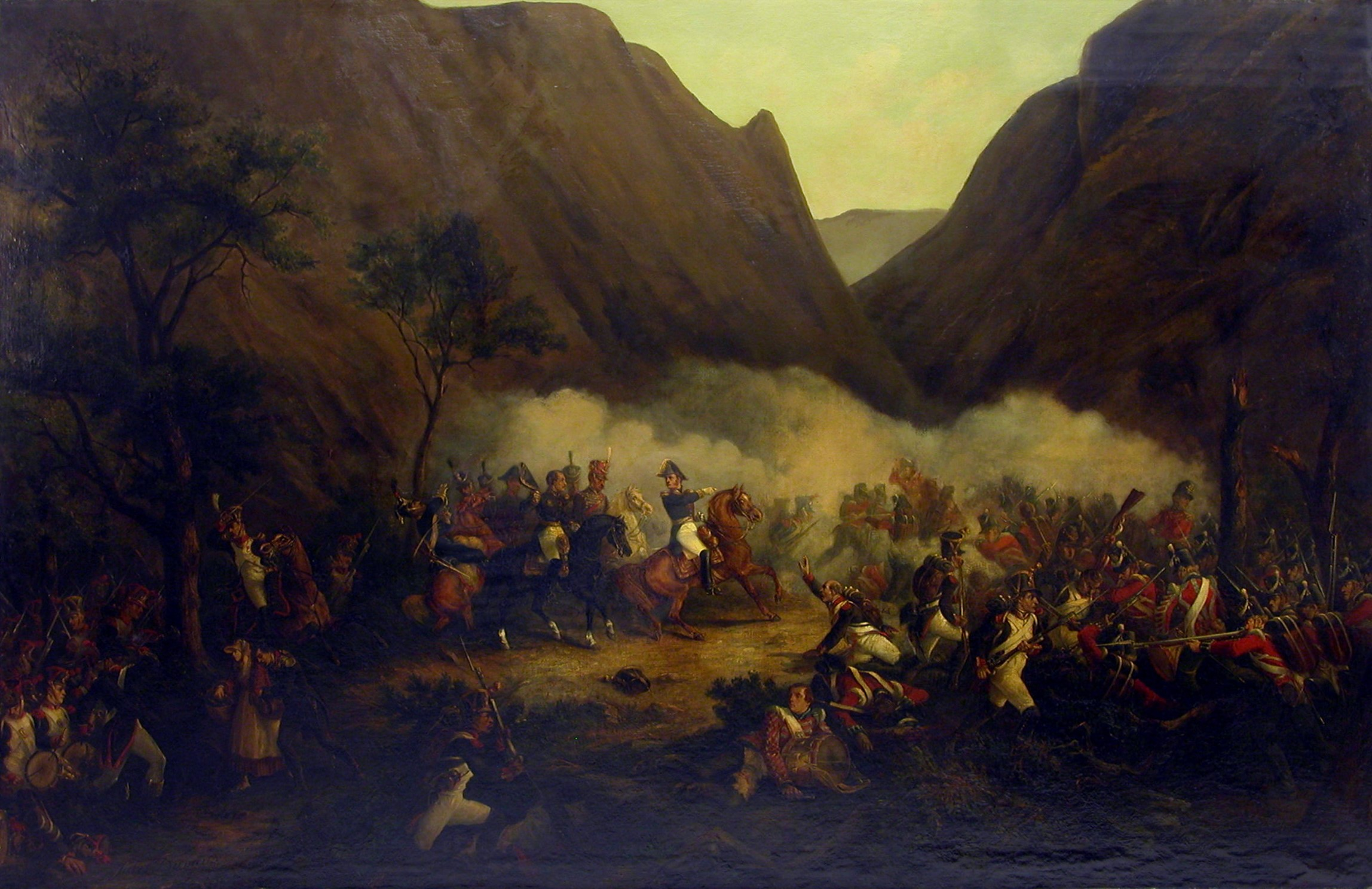
- 1871 painting of the battle
Date	25 July 1813
Location	Maya Pass, Navarre 43°12′14″N 1°28′53″W
Result	French victory

Belligerents
France	United Kingdom; Portugal

Commanders and leaders
Jean-Baptiste Drouet, Comte d'Erlon	William Stewart; William Henry Pringle

Strength
21,000; • 2,000–2,100 engaged	4,000 or 6,000; • Unknown number engaged, likely fewer than the French one (Note: The description of the battle given in the article confirms this claim.); 4 guns

Casualties and losses
800–900 only killed or wounded or 2,100 killed, wounded or missing	144 killed 994 wounded 350 missing (Note: The figures listed are only for British losses, not Portuguese.) or 1,800 killed or wounded 4 guns captured

Peninsular War
Vitoria and the Pyrenees, 1813–1814
current battle

The Battle of Maya (25 July 1813) saw an Imperial French corps led by Jean-Baptiste Drouet, Comte d'Erlon attack the British 2nd Division under William Stewart at the Maya Pass—a choke point in the western Pyrenees. Despite the fact that Commander-in-Chief Wellington was taken by surprise, the outnumbered British soldiers fought stoutly. Since the British position was a choke point, the French were unable to effectively exploit their numerical superiority. By the afternoon, the French gained the upper hand and were pressing forward, but the late arrival of a brigade from the British 7th Division stabilized the situation. The British forces slipped away under the cover of night and the French did not pursue effectively. The Peninsular War battle at Maya was part of the Battle of the Pyrenees, which ended in a significant Anglo-Allied victory.

== Background ==
Arthur Wellesley, Marquess Wellington won a significant victory over the French army of King Joseph Bonaparte and Marshal Jean-Baptiste Jourdan French army at the Battle of Vitoria on 21 June 1813. For the loss of 5,000 men, the Allies inflicted 8,000 casualties on the French and captured all their artillery except one howitzer. Joseph's Spanish kingdom was irretrievably lost while the enemies of Emperor Napoleon were encouraged to continue the War of the Sixth Coalition. Two major fortresses in Spain remained in French hands, San Sebastián and Pamplona. Wellington began the Siege of San Sebastián, employing his siege train to reduce it. The Siege of Pamplona was simultaneously carried out by Spanish troops, but without siege guns, they had to starve out the French garrison.

Marshal Jean-de-Dieu Soult became the new French army commander on 12 July 1813. Within a short period of time, Soult abolished the previous army organizations and welded his 72,000 infantry and 7,000 cavalry into a new Army of Spain. The new formation included a Reserve and three so-called "lieutenancies", actually army corps. Napoleon charged Soult to "reestablish my affairs in Spain and to preserve Pamplona and San Sebastián". At Vitoria, the French artillerists abandoned 151 guns, but brought away their horses in their flight. Therefore, it was a fairly simple matter to draw on the large number of cannons stored in the Bayonne arsenal to rearm the French batteries. The nine infantry divisions received 72 guns, the two cavalry divisions 12, the Reserve 32 and the artillery reserve 24, for a total of 140 guns.

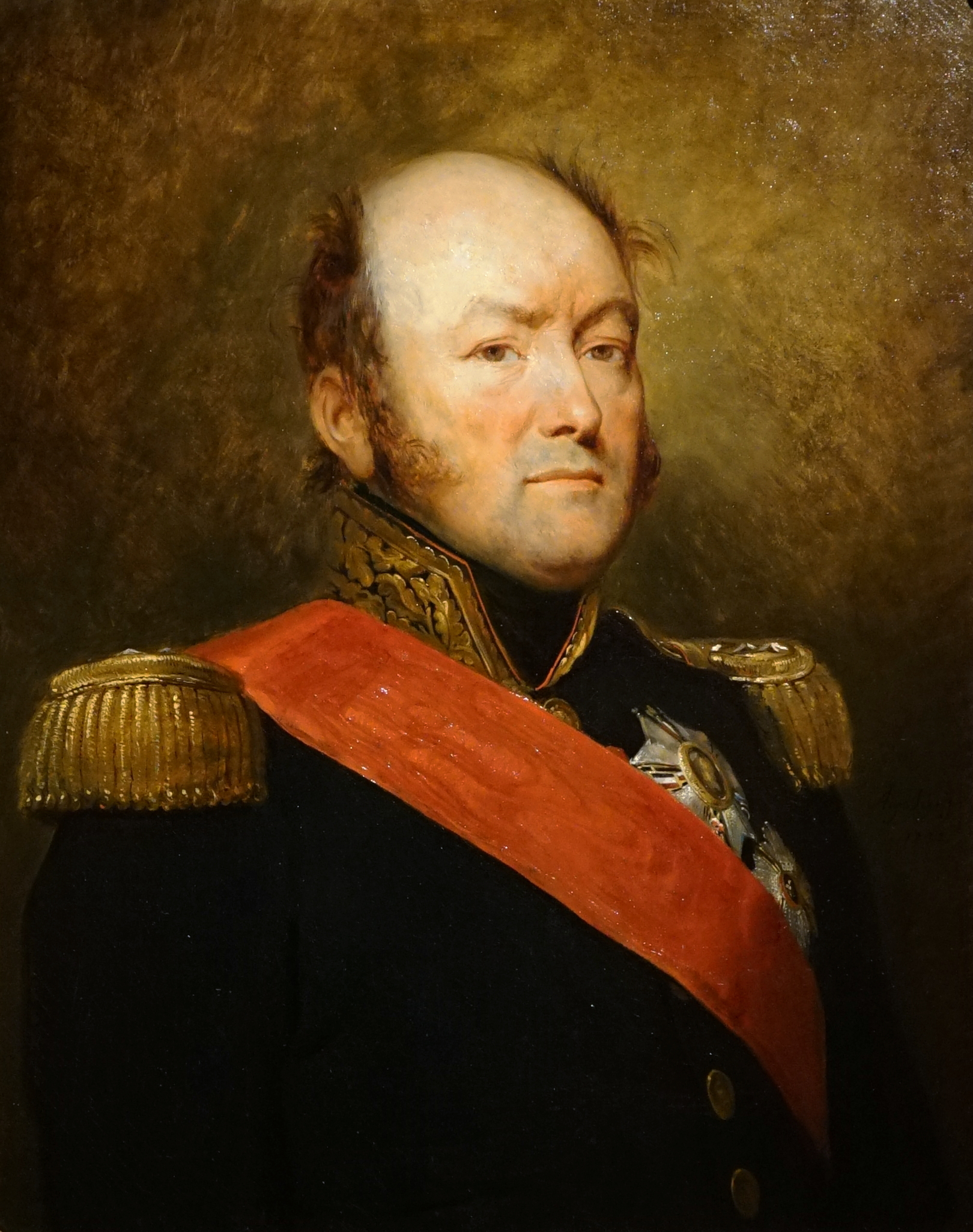
Comte d'Erlon

D'Erlon was given command of the 20,957-man Center lieutenancy. This included the infantry divisions of Jean Barthélemy Darmagnac, Louis Jean Nicolas Abbé and Jean-Pierre Maransin. Honoré Charles Reille led the 17,235-strong Right lieutenancy which was made up of the divisions of Maximilien Sébastien Foy, Antoine Louis Popon de Maucune and Thomas Mignot de Lamartinière. Bertrand Clausel assumed leadership of the 17,218-man Left lieutenancy which consisted of the divisions of Nicolas François Conroux, Edmé-Martin Vandermaesen and Eloi Charlemagne Taupin. Confusingly, the lieutenancies did not fight in the positions originally assigned to them and d'Erlon's so-called Center actually fought on the right in July 1813. The 17,254-man Reserve was under the command of Eugène-Casimir Villatte. There were 7,147 cavalrymen split into two divisions under Anne-François-Charles Trelliard and Pierre Benoît Soult.

At dawn on 8 July the French abandoned the Maya Pass. Rowland Hill occupied the pass with two British brigades while Portuguese units held the Izpegui and Berderis Passes farther east. At the end of July, the Anglo-Portuguese 5th Division besieged San Sebastián, the 1st Division and Spanish units defended the line of the Bidasoa at the coast, the Light Division was at Bera, the 7th Division was at Etxalar, the 2nd Division held Maya Pass, the Portuguese Division was farther south, the 6th Division was back at Doneztebe (Santesteban), the 4th Division held Roncevaux Pass and the 3rd Division was in reserve at Olague. The 2nd and Portuguese Divisions belonged to Hill's corps. Uneasy at having to cover two besieged fortresses at once, Wellington wrote, "we are not so strong as we ought to be".

Soult aimed to relieve Pamplona by sending d'Erlon against Maya Pass while Reille and Clausel attacked Roncevaux Pass farther to the southeast. Villatte was to demonstrate against the Allies along the coast. After breaking through the passes the French columns were to converge on Pamplona. Reille's troops, which were positioned on the coast, were ordered to shift far inland to join Clausel's troops. Because heavy rains washed out a bridge, the offensive started one day behind schedule to allow Reille's men to catch up.

== Battle ==
=== Plans ===
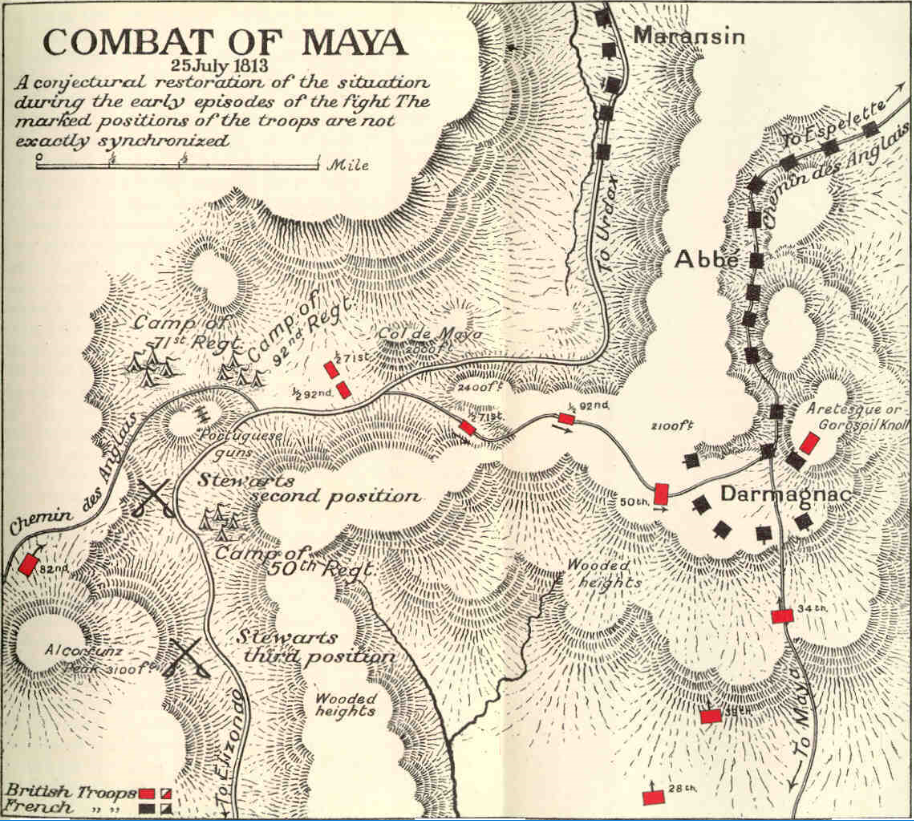
Combat of Maya by Charles Oman

Hill was in command of the Allied defenses from Maya Pass south to Aldudes. Maya Pass was defended by the British brigades of William Henry Pringle and John Cameron from William Stewart's 2nd Division. Charles Ashworth's Portuguese brigade, also from 2nd Division, was farther south at Izpegui Pass. The Portuguese Division of Francisco Silveira's continued the line to the south, with Hipólito da Costa's brigade watching the Berderis Pass and Archibald Campbell's brigade posted at the heights above Aldudes. Historian Charles Oman asserted that Stewart's defensive arrangements were "ludicrously incomplete". The French had a large force at Urdax only 4 miles (6 km) distant but routine reconnaissance patrols were not sent out. Cameron's brigade with four guns from Da Cunha's Portuguese battery was well-positioned across the main road at the west end of the Maya saddle, but at the east end there was only an 80-man picket on the Aretesque knoll. Pringle's brigade was camped 2.5 miles (4.0 km) to the south in the village of Maya while the brigade's four light companies camped closer to the Maya Pass.

To distract the Allies' attention from his main assaults, Soult ordered the local French National Guard to conduct a feint attack at Aldudes. At dawn on 25 July 1813, Campbell's brigade attacked and routed these poorly trained militiamen. Hearing the musketry from this clash, Hill rode from his headquarters at Elizondo to Aldudes to investigate, removing him from the area of Maya Pass. This was within Hill's responsibility, since Campbell's brigade was part of his corps. Less excusably, Stewart also heard the gunfire and rode south to Aldudes, leaving the 2nd Division leaderless. In Stewart's absence, command of the division devolved upon Brigadier General Pringle, who had arrived in Spain two days before and was unfamiliar with the terrain.

The main road across the Maya Pass ascends from the French side to reach the Spanish village of Urdax. From Urdax, the road rises to the pass before descending toward Elizondo. Farther east the Gorospil path rises from the French village of Espelette before passing near the Aretesque knoll. Then the path turns west along the Maya ridge and crosses the main road. The Gorospil path later became known as the Chemin des Anglais after the British improved it. There was a lot of dead ground in front of the Maya ridge and d'Erlon resolved to take advantage of it. D'Erlon sent Maransin's division up the main road but gave that general instructions to stay out of sight until the other two divisions seized the east end of the ridge. That morning, Darmagnac's division marched from Espelette on the Gorospil path with Abbé's division following right behind.

=== Eastern ridge ===
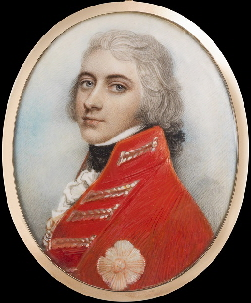
William Henry Pringle

Moyle Sherer, the commander of the Aretesque picket reported seeing distant movement. The staff officer sent to investigate ordered up the four light infantry companies. This increased the knoll's defenders from 80 to 400 men. At 10:30 am, d'Erlon unleashed the eight light infantry companies from Darmagnac's division. Bursting from cover, the skirmishers rushed forward to surround the Aretesque knoll, followed by the 16th Light Infantry Regiment in column. Though surprised, the British defenders threw back several waves of attackers, but while the struggle was going on, Darmagnac's division was filing past the knoll to reach the eastern crest of the ridge. The 8th Line Infantry Regiment circled behind the knoll so that none could escape. After 45 minutes of fighting, the British light infantry companies and the picket were wiped out; there were 260 dead and wounded plus six officers and 140 men captured unwounded.

Pringle rode to join Cameron's brigade at the western end of Maya ridge. The battalions of Pringle's brigade marched up the steep path toward the eastern end of the ridge, coming into action piecemeal. The 34th Foot arrived first but was unable to push the French off the crest of the ridge. A member of the 34th recalled, "the pass up was narrow, steep and tiresome, the loads heavy, and the men blown. We labored on but all too late -- our comrades [that is, the light infantry companies] were all killed, wounded or prisoners." It was after 11:00 am that the Portuguese cannons began to fire—a signal that Maya Pass was under attack. Pringle ordered the 50th Foot from Cameron's brigade to move east along the ridge in an attempt to dislodge Darmagnac's battalions. The 39th Foot and the 28th Foot were the second and third battalions of Pringle's brigade to attack Darmagnac's division from the valley.

As the 50th Foot was driven back, Pringle sent the right wing of the 92nd Foot (Gordon Highlanders), almost 400 men, to attack Darmagnac's troops. The British general personally coordinated the 92nd's attack with the 28th, which had just made it up to the Maya ridge. The Highlanders and the French engaged in an epic musketry duel at a range of 120 yards (110 m). The French probably suffered greater casualties, but in the end the British were crushed by the musketry from the more numerous French. The half-battalion of Highlanders lost 60% of its numbers and was compelled to retreat to the west, joining the now-rallied 50th Foot. At about this time, the 28th Foot began to retire downhill toward Maya village, joined by the 34th Foot and possibly by the 39th Foot of Pringle's brigade.

=== Western ridge ===
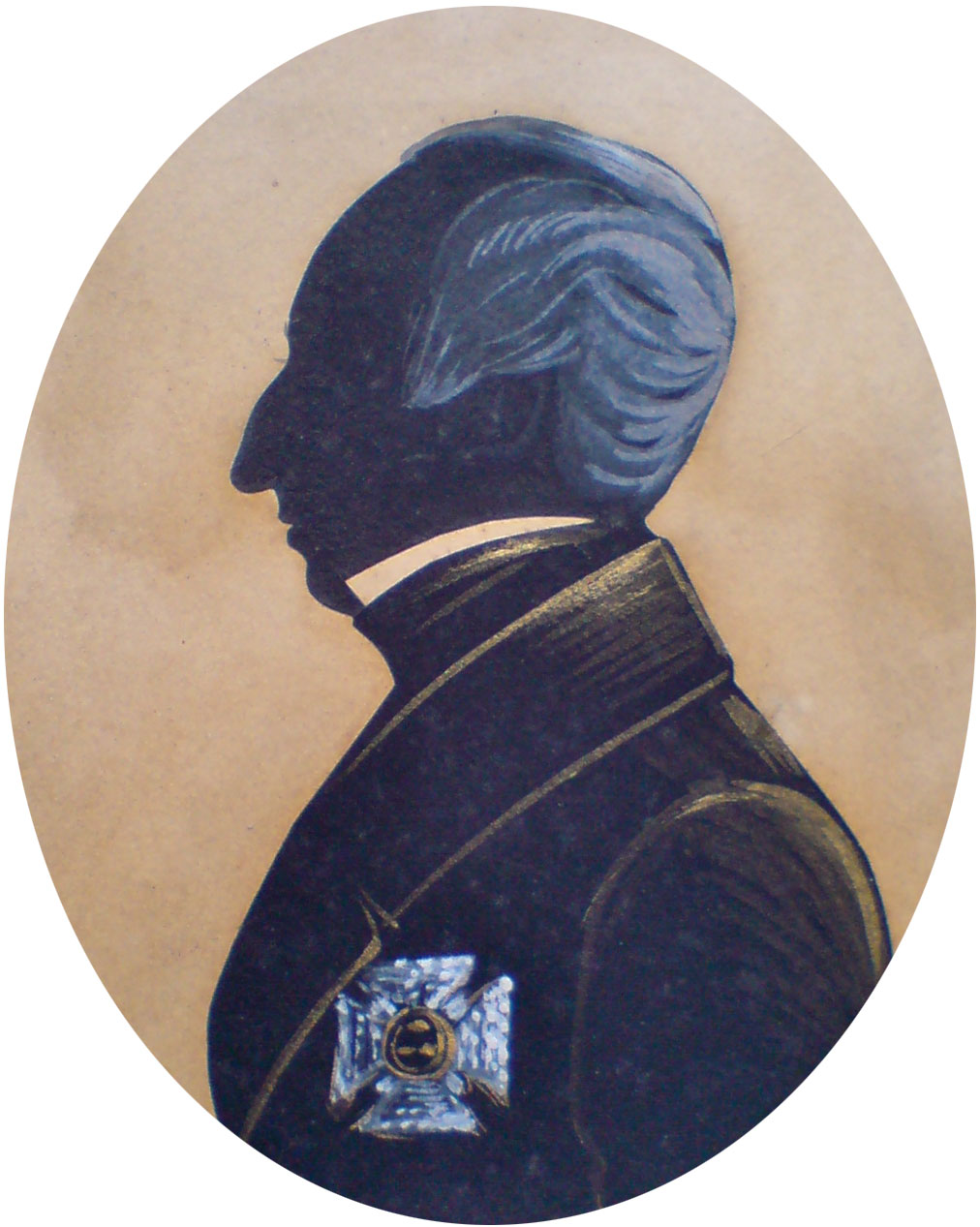
John Cameron

D'Erlon sent two battalions downhill to hustle the withdrawal of Pringle's brigade. The bulk of Darmagnac's division began pressing west along the ridge top. By this time, Maransin's division put in an appearance on the main road while Abbé's division crowded up behind Darmagnac. In the face of this threat, Cameron sent the right wing of the 71st Foot (Highlanders) to stop the Darmagnac's division, which was formed into a thick swarm of skirmishers by this time. The 71st poured in a very effective initial volley but the French responded by trying to envelop the Highlanders on both flanks, forcing them back. At 2:00 pm Stewart finally showed up to find the British position critical. Seeing that the pass was lost, he issued orders to withdraw from the crest and reform a new line farther back. He hoped to be assisted by the 7th Division to whom Pringle had sent urgent appeals for help.

In the confusion, two Portuguese guns were overrun as they tried to withdraw. The crews of the other two cannon, seeing that they were about to be captured, tumbled the guns into a ravine. These were the only guns taken in the field from Wellington, and he blamed Stewart who canceled an earlier order by Pringle for the guns to pull back. Darmagnac's division was completely fought out and was replaced in the front line by Maransin's division, with Abbé's division backing it up. It took time for Maransin's troops to file up the road and deploy on the summit so there was a half-hour lull in the action. Below the summit, Stewart set up his first line across the main road, composed of the left wings of the 71st and 92nd Foot. One company of the 92nd was on a steep knoll to the left. The second line was 300 yards (274 m) behind the first. It was formed from the right wing of the 71st and the 50th Foot.

After 3:00 pm, Maransin's division advanced against Stewart's new position. The first line fired a volley, then withdrew behind the second line where it reformed. Then the new first line repeated the process, during which Cameron's brigade yielded about 0.5 miles (0.8 km) of ground. When the campgrounds of the 71st and 92nd Foot were overrun, many French soldiers fell out of their ranks to pillage the tents. Aside from the looting, the rows of British tents disordered the French formation, causing a pause in the action. Maransin's division lurched forward again at about 4:30 pm, but was suddenly stopped by a counterattack by the newly arrived 82nd Foot. This battalion from the 7th Division had been nearby and finally received permission to pitch into the fight. After an interval, the French rallied and again began to press back their adversaries. At about this time, Stewart was shot in the leg, but insisted on remaining in command.

At 6:00 pm, the 6th Foot and the Brunswick Oels from the brigade of Edward Barnes arrived on the battlefield from the west. Marching along the western extension of the Chemin des Anglais, these 1,500 soldiers struck Maransin's division from an unexpected direction. The battalion of the 103rd Line Infantry was badly mauled, losing 15 out of 20 officers. The 82nd Foot and the survivors of Cameron's brigade rallied and returned to the attack, pushing Maransin's surprised soldiers uphill. Finally, D'Erlon threw in one of Abbé's fresh brigades and Maransin's troops rallied behind it. The French corps commander also recalled one of Darmagnac's brigades which had gone in pursuit of Pringle's brigade. Fearing that he was confronted by two full divisions, d'Erlon refused to commit Abbé's division to an attack. The battle petered out about 8:00 pm with the French in possession of Maya Pass, but with the British in position nearby.

== Result ==
Hill arrived on the scene soon after the fighting stopped. He had already seen a dispatch from Lowry Cole to Wellington reporting the Battle of Roncesvalles that day. Cole wrote that he was attacked by 35,000 French soldiers and was obliged to retreat southwards towards Pamplona. With Roncevaux Pass uncovered, Hill ordered Stewart and Barnes to retreat. They slipped away at midnight and marched to Elizondo. The British had been fighting for ten hours so the seriously wounded had to be abandoned and straggling was heavy. That morning, d'Erlon expected another fight, so the French did not pursue until long after sunrise. D'Erlon reported that he had won a victory, but he phrased it in modest tones. Historian Michael Glover stated that Stewart's "defense was mismanaged".

Darmagnac's division sustained 1,400 casualties out of 6,900 present, Maransin's division lost 600 out of 6,000 and Abbé's division 100 out of 8,000, including brigade commander Antoine Rignoux wounded. Cameron's brigade suffered 800 casualties out of 1,900 present, Pringle's brigade lost 530 out of 2,000 and Barnes's brigade plus the 82nd Foot lost only 140. There were 6,000 British soldiers engaged and they lost four guns. Historian Digby Smith called Maya a British victory. British casualties were 144 killed, 994 wounded and 350 missing for a total of 1,488. There were no Portuguese losses listed. Later Wellington admitted that splitting his forces in order to besiege both San Sebastián and Pamplona simultaneously was, "one of the greatest faults he ever committed in war".

== Forces ==
=== French order of battle ===
July 1813 Composition of d'Erlon's Center Lieutenancy
Corps	Division	Strength	Casualties	Brigade	Units
Center: General of Division; Jean-Baptiste Drouet d'Erlon	2nd Division: General of Division; Jean Barthélemy Darmagnac	6,961	1,400	General of Brigade; David Hendrik Chassé	16th Light Infantry Regiment, 1 battalion
Center: General of Division; Jean-Baptiste Drouet d'Erlon	2nd Division: General of Division; Jean Barthélemy Darmagnac	6,961	1,400	General of Brigade; David Hendrik Chassé	8th Line Infantry Regiment, 1 battalion
Center: General of Division; Jean-Baptiste Drouet d'Erlon	2nd Division: General of Division; Jean Barthélemy Darmagnac	6,961	1,400	General of Brigade; David Hendrik Chassé	28th Line Infantry Regiment, 2 battalions
Center: General of Division; Jean-Baptiste Drouet d'Erlon	2nd Division: General of Division; Jean Barthélemy Darmagnac	6,961	1,400	General of Brigade; Nicolas Gruardet	51st Line Infantry Regiment, 1 battalion
Center: General of Division; Jean-Baptiste Drouet d'Erlon	2nd Division: General of Division; Jean Barthélemy Darmagnac	6,961	1,400	General of Brigade; Nicolas Gruardet	54th Line Infantry Regiment, 1 battalion
Center: General of Division; Jean-Baptiste Drouet d'Erlon	2nd Division: General of Division; Jean Barthélemy Darmagnac	6,961	1,400	General of Brigade; Nicolas Gruardet	75th Line Infantry Regiment, 2 battalions
Center: General of Division; Jean-Baptiste Drouet d'Erlon	3rd Division: General of Division; Louis Jean Nicolas Abbé	8,030	100	General of Brigade; Antoine Rignoux (WIA)	27th Light Infantry Regiment, 1 battalion
Center: General of Division; Jean-Baptiste Drouet d'Erlon	3rd Division: General of Division; Louis Jean Nicolas Abbé	8,030	100	General of Brigade; Antoine Rignoux (WIA)	63rd Line Infantry Regiment, 1 battalion
Center: General of Division; Jean-Baptiste Drouet d'Erlon	3rd Division: General of Division; Louis Jean Nicolas Abbé	8,030	100	General of Brigade; Antoine Rignoux (WIA)	64th Line Infantry Regiment, 2 battalions
Center: General of Division; Jean-Baptiste Drouet d'Erlon	3rd Division: General of Division; Louis Jean Nicolas Abbé	8,030	100	General of Brigade; Charles-François Rémond	5th Light Infantry Regiment, 2 battalions
Center: General of Division; Jean-Baptiste Drouet d'Erlon	3rd Division: General of Division; Louis Jean Nicolas Abbé	8,030	100	General of Brigade; Charles-François Rémond	94th Line Infantry Regiment, 2 battalions
Center: General of Division; Jean-Baptiste Drouet d'Erlon	3rd Division: General of Division; Louis Jean Nicolas Abbé	8,030	100	General of Brigade; Charles-François Rémond	95th Line Infantry Regiment, 1 battalion
Center: General of Division; Jean-Baptiste Drouet d'Erlon	6th Division: General of Division; Jean-Pierre Maransin	5,966	600	General of Brigade; Louis Paul Baille de Saint-Pol	21st Light Infantry Regiment, 1 battalion
Center: General of Division; Jean-Baptiste Drouet d'Erlon	6th Division: General of Division; Jean-Pierre Maransin	5,966	600	General of Brigade; Louis Paul Baille de Saint-Pol	24th Line Infantry Regiment, 1 battalion
Center: General of Division; Jean-Baptiste Drouet d'Erlon	6th Division: General of Division; Jean-Pierre Maransin	5,966	600	General of Brigade; Louis Paul Baille de Saint-Pol	96th Line Infantry Regiment, 1 battalion
Center: General of Division; Jean-Baptiste Drouet d'Erlon	6th Division: General of Division; Jean-Pierre Maransin	5,966	600	General of Brigade; Georges Alexis Mocquery	28th Light Infantry Regiment, 1 battalion
Center: General of Division; Jean-Baptiste Drouet d'Erlon	6th Division: General of Division; Jean-Pierre Maransin	5,966	600	General of Brigade; Georges Alexis Mocquery	101st Line Infantry Regiment, 2 battalions
Center: General of Division; Jean-Baptiste Drouet d'Erlon	6th Division: General of Division; Jean-Pierre Maransin	5,966	600	General of Brigade; Georges Alexis Mocquery	103rd Line Infantry Regiment, 1 battalion

=== Allied order of battle ===
Allied Forces Engaged at Maya Pass
Corps	Division	Brigade	Units	Casualties
Hill's Corps: Lieutenant General; Rowland Hill	2nd Division: Lieutenant General; William Stewart	Major General; William Henry Pringle	28th Foot Regiment, 1st Battalion	159
Hill's Corps: Lieutenant General; Rowland Hill	2nd Division: Lieutenant General; William Stewart	Major General; William Henry Pringle	34th Foot Regiment, 2nd Battalion	168
Hill's Corps: Lieutenant General; Rowland Hill	2nd Division: Lieutenant General; William Stewart	Major General; William Henry Pringle	39th Foot Regiment, 1st Battalion	186
Hill's Corps: Lieutenant General; Rowland Hill	2nd Division: Lieutenant General; William Stewart	Major General; William Henry Pringle	60th Foot, 5th Battalion, 1 company	44
Hill's Corps: Lieutenant General; Rowland Hill	2nd Division: Lieutenant General; William Stewart	Major General; William Henry Pringle	Da Cunha's Portuguese Battery	15
Hill's Corps: Lieutenant General; Rowland Hill	2nd Division: Lieutenant General; William Stewart	Lieutenant Colonel; John Cameron	50th Foot Regiment, 1st Battalion	249
Hill's Corps: Lieutenant General; Rowland Hill	2nd Division: Lieutenant General; William Stewart	Lieutenant Colonel; John Cameron	71st Foot Regiment, 1st Battalion	196
Hill's Corps: Lieutenant General; Rowland Hill	2nd Division: Lieutenant General; William Stewart	Lieutenant Colonel; John Cameron	92nd Foot Regiment, 1st Battalion	343
Hill's Corps: Lieutenant General; Rowland Hill	2nd Division: Lieutenant General; William Stewart	Lieutenant Colonel; John Cameron	60th Foot, 5th Battalion, 1 company	see above
Hill's Corps: Lieutenant General; Rowland Hill	7th Division: Lieutenant General; George Ramsay, 9th Earl of Dalhousie	Major General; Edward Barnes	6th Foot Regiment, 1st Battalion	21
Hill's Corps: Lieutenant General; Rowland Hill	7th Division: Lieutenant General; George Ramsay, 9th Earl of Dalhousie	Major General; Edward Barnes	Brunswick Oels Regiment	41
Hill's Corps: Lieutenant General; Rowland Hill	7th Division: Lieutenant General; George Ramsay, 9th Earl of Dalhousie	Unattached	82nd Foot Regiment, 1st Battalion	79
