= Wellington at Sorauren =

Painting by Thomas Jones Barker

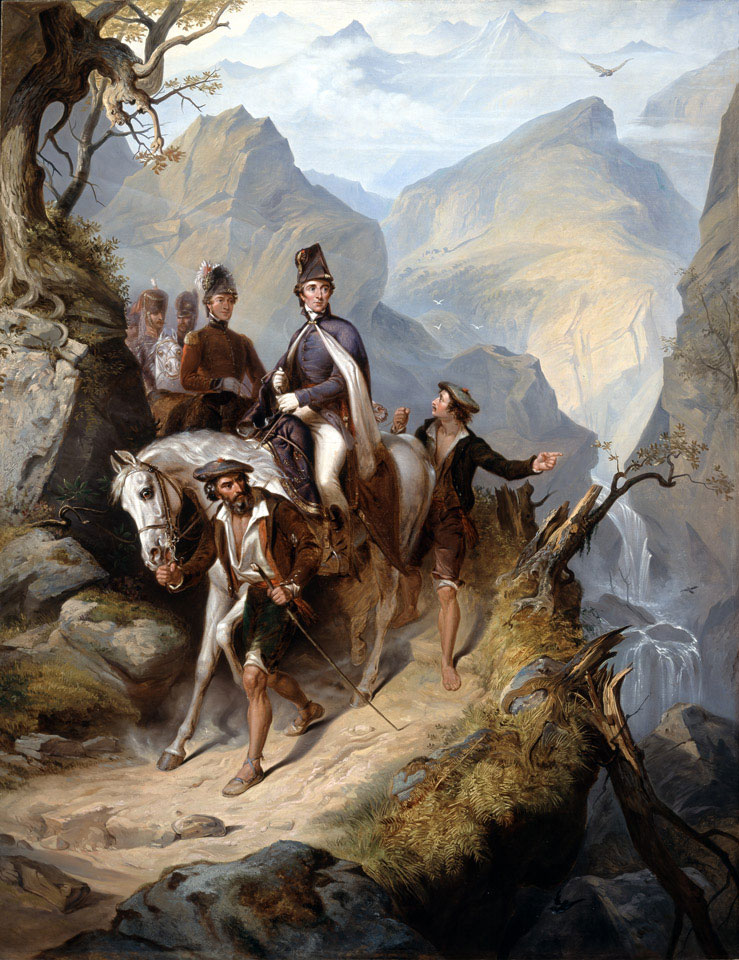
- Artist: Thomas Jones Barker
- Year: 1853
- Type: Oil on canvas, history painting
- Dimensions: 129 cm × 99 cm (51 in × 39 in)
- Location: National Army Museum, London

Wellington at Sorauren is an oil on canvas history painting by the British artist Thomas Jones Barker, from 1853.

== History and description ==
It shows a scene from 1813 with the Marquess of Wellington, the Allied commander in the Peninsular War, being escorted by local guides across the mountains close to Sorauren in Spain. The Battle of Sorauren fought in the summer of 1813 was part of the wider Battle of the Pyrenees. French forces under Marshal Soult launched an attempt to relieve the besieged cities of Pamplona and San Sebastián. Fitzroy Somerset and other members of his staff are shown riding behind Wellington. The theme of a general leading his troops through a mountain range echoes Hannibal's crossing of the Alps. It was displayed at the Royal Academy Exhibition of 1853 at the National Gallery. Today the painting is in the National Army Museum in London. A larger version of the work was produced by Barker the following year and is now in the Wellington Collection.

== Bibliography ==
- Hichberger J.W.M. Images of the Army: The Military in British Art, 1815-1914. Manchester University Press, 2017.
- Muir, Rory. Wellington: The Path to Victory, 1769–1814. Yale University Press, 2013.
- Wellesley, Charles. Wellington Portrayed. Unicorn Press, 2014.
