= Amaiur-Maya =

Maya Amaiur
- village
- Amaiur/Maya
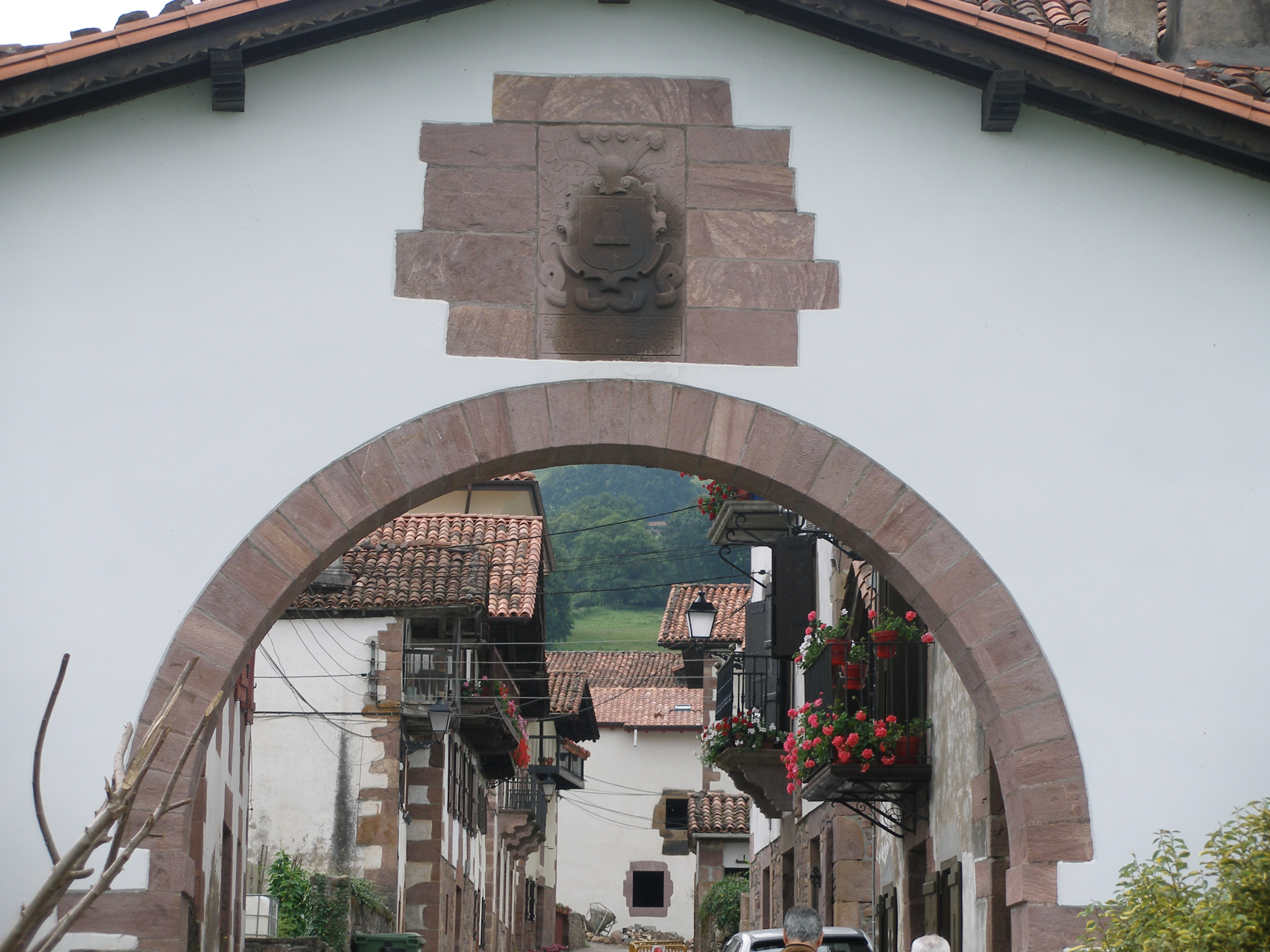
- Entrance to Maya

- Location within Navarre Location within Spain
- Coordinates: 43.1999682°N 1.4804353°W
- Municipality: Baztán

Amaiur-Maya (Basque: Amaiur; Spanish: Maya de Baztán; officially: Amaiur-Maya) is a village in the municipality of Baztan in the autonomous region of Navarre in Spain. It is situated in the Pyrenees mountain range close to the border with France.

== History ==
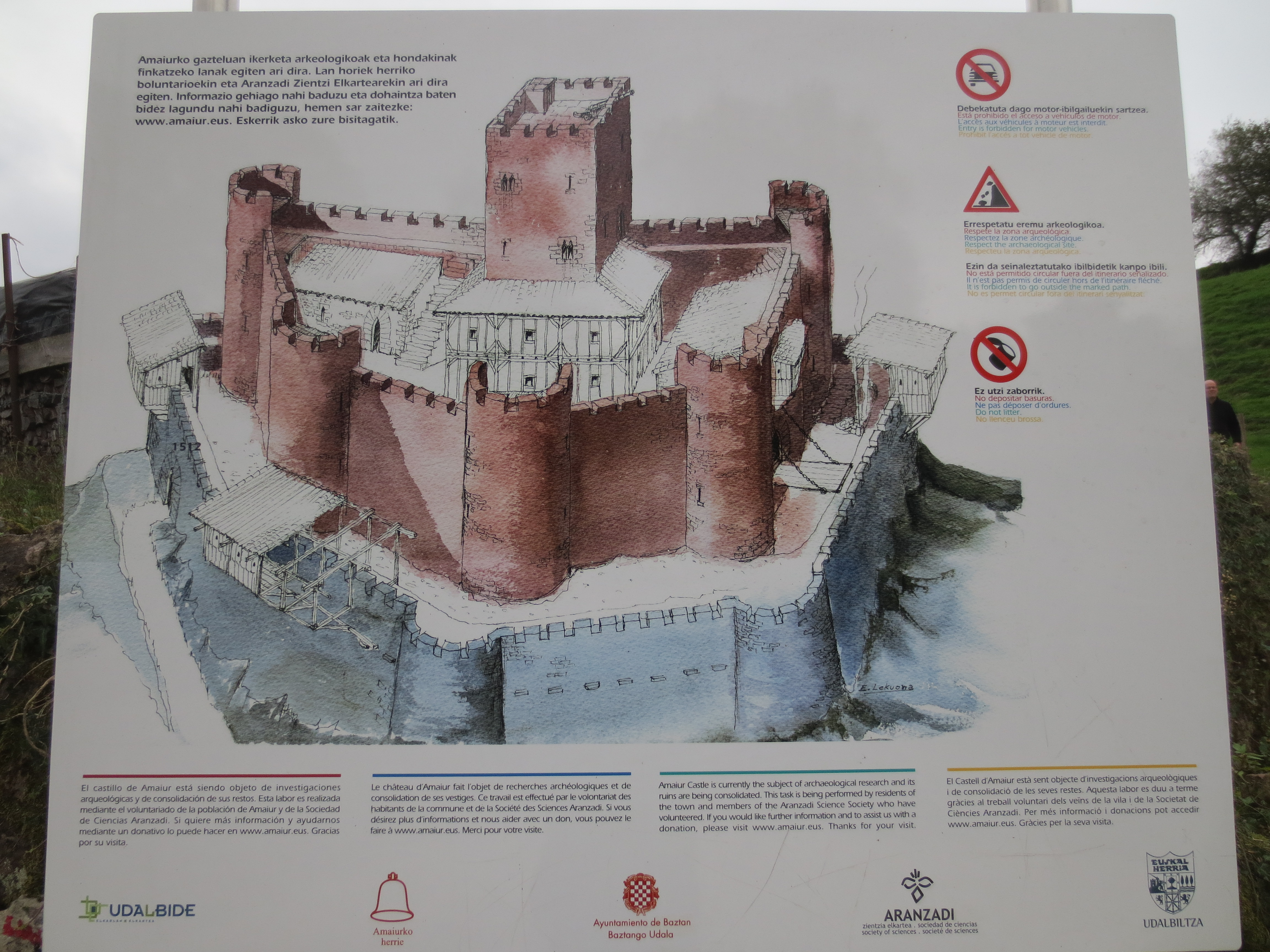
The Royal Castle of Amauir-Maya

The fortress of Amaiur, sitting on a hill by the village, was one of the key medieval strongholds of the Kingdom of Navarre. It was one of the few fortresses in Navarre making a stand against the Castilian invasion of 1512, once they had taken over Pamplona. It bore witness to frequent battles between the combined French-Navarrese and the Spanish imperial forces (Ferdinand the Catholic, Charles V), with the most famous being the Battle of Amaiur (Maya) in 1522, when the mayor of Amauir-Maya and Alcaide of the Castle Don Jaime Velaz de Medrano held the last Navarrese stronghold in an attempt to resist the Spanish (Castilian-Aragonese) push.

The Battle of Maya (25 July 1813) was fought by French and British forces during the Peninsular War, in the Maya Pass close to the village.

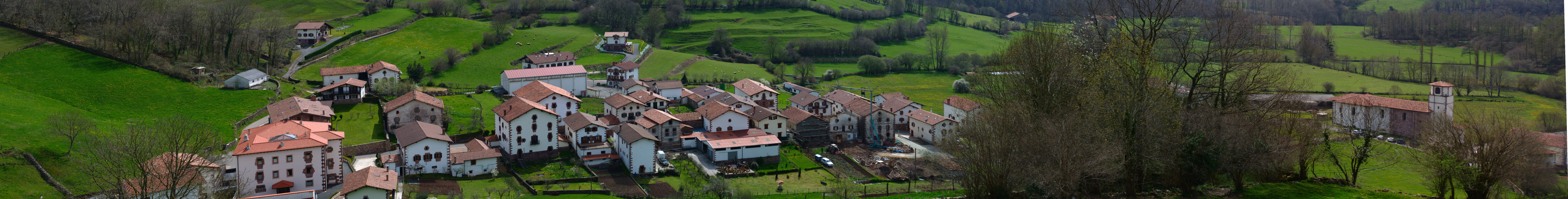
Panoramic view of the village of Maya from the hill where the castle ruins are located.

== See also ==
- Spanish conquest of Iberian Navarre
