= Moyle Sherer =

British army officer, traveller and writer

Moyle Sherer (or Joseph Moyle Sherer; 18 February 1789 – 15 November 1869) was a British army officer, traveller and writer.

== Early life ==
Moyle was born in Southampton, the youngest son of Joseph Sherer. He was lineally descended, through his grandmother, from the Moyles of Bake, Cornwall. Aged twelve he was sent to Winchester College, but left on obtaining a commission in the 34th (Cumberland) Regiment of Foot (which later became part of the Border Regiment).

In 1809 his corps was ordered to Portugal, and was soon engaged in the Peninsula War. The regiment took part in the Battle of Albuera, the Battle of Arroyo dos Molinos, and the Battle of Vitoria. In the summer of 1813, Sherer was taken prisoner at the Battle of Maya, and was removed to France, where he remained for two years, living chiefly at Bayonne.

== Writing career ==
In 1818 the 34th went out to Madras (present-day Chennai), and from there Sherer sent home the manuscript of his first book, Sketches of India. It was published in 1821, and went through four editions. He returned to England in 1823 and, encouraged by his success, produced Recollections of the Peninsula, which was also popular and reached a fifth edition.

In 1824 his Scenes and Impressions in Egypt and Italy followed, an account of his pioneering experience of an overland route. In 1825 Sherer turned to fiction, and wrote The Story of a Life, in two volumes, which passed through three editions. In the same year a visit to the continent produced a volume entitled A Ramble in Germany (1826). While in India, Sherer had acquired evangelical religious views, and, anxious to promote them among his comrades in the army, published in 1827 a treatise, Religio Militis.

In 1829 he returned to fiction, and brought out Tales of the Wars of our Times, in two volumes. This work proved less successful than some of its predecessors. Of a Life of Wellington, which he contributed to Dionysius Lardner's Cabinet Cyclopædia, 1830–2, the first volume passed through three editions, and the second through four. In 1837 he published his final work of fiction, The Broken Font, set in the English Civil War (two volumes), which was less successful. In 1838 he produced a volume of extracts from his earlier works, named Imagery of Foreign Travel.

== Retirement ==
Moyle was a keen soldier; he was promoted to a brevet majority in 1830, and became a captain in 1831. He had little taste for garrison life, and about 1836 he retired from the army and lived at Claverton Farm, near Bath. For many years, though changing his residence, he remained in the same neighbourhood. Towards the end of his life he became mentally ill, and moved to Brislington House near Bristol. He died there in 1869, and was buried in Brislington churchyard.
