= Siege of Pamplona (1813) =

1813 siege during the Peninsular War

- Part of Peninsular War
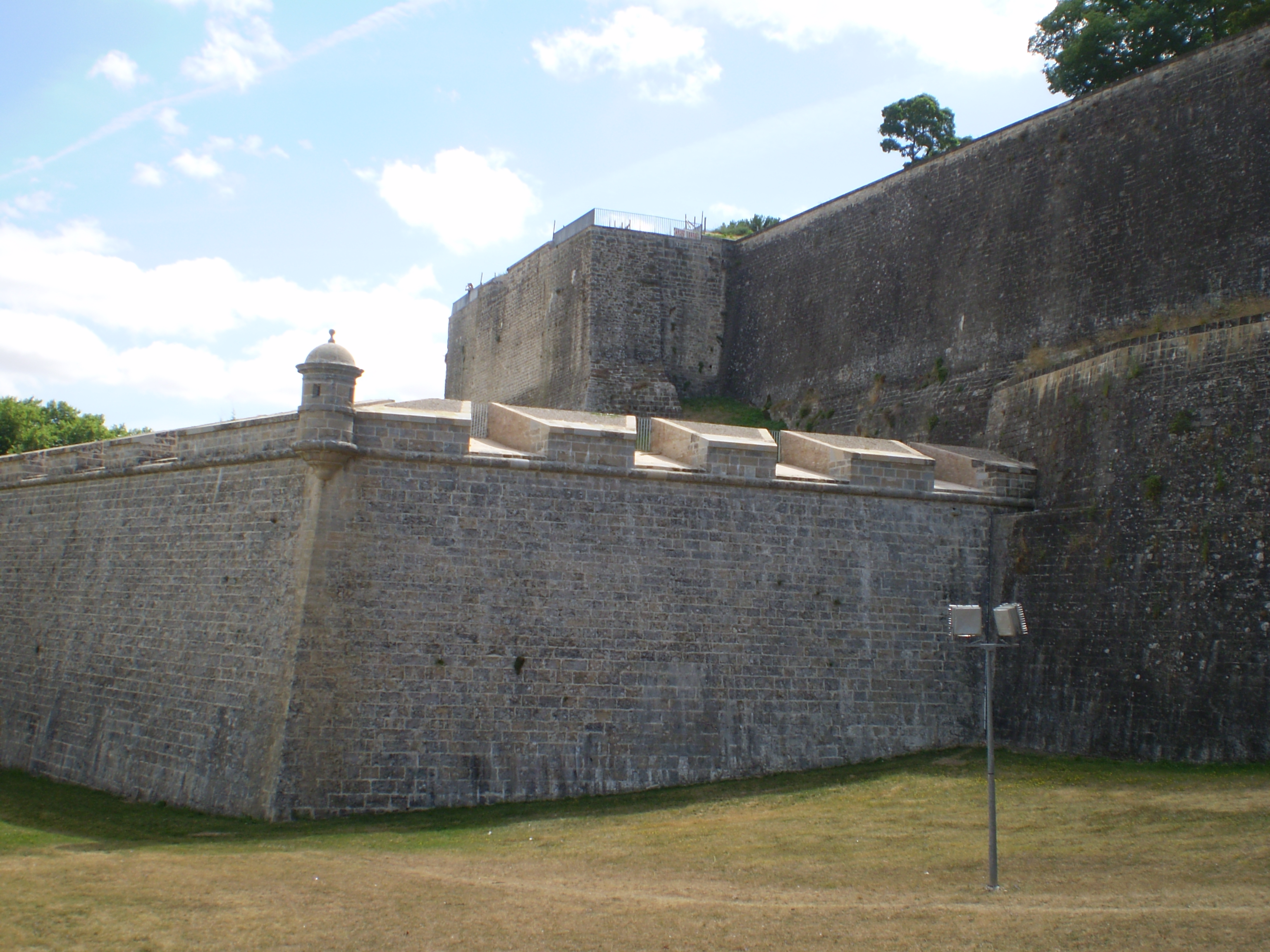
- Part of the Pamplona fortress.
Date	26 June – 31 October 1813
Location	Pamplona, Spain 42°49′N 01°39′W
Result	Anglo-Spanish victory

Belligerents
Kingdom of Spain; United Kingdom	(France) First French Empire

Commanders and leaders
(Spain) Henry O'Donnell (Spain) Carlos de España (United Kingdom) Marquess Wellington (United Kingdom) Lord Dalhousie	(France) Louis Cassan

Strength
9,500–14,183, 12 guns	3,450–3,800; 80 heavy & 54 field guns

Casualties and losses
2,000	3,450–3,800, all guns

Peninsular War
Vitoria and the Pyrenees, 1813–1814
current battle

In the siege of Pamplona (26 June – 31 October 1813), a Spanish force led by Captain General Henry (Enrique José) O'Donnell and later Lieutenant General Carlos de España blockaded an Imperial French garrison under the command of General of Brigade Louis Pierre Jean Cassan. At first, troops under Arthur Wellesley, Marquess Wellington surrounded the city, but they were soon replaced by Spanish units. In late July 1813, Marshal Nicolas Soult attempted to relieve the city but his operation failed in the Battle of the Pyrenees. Cassan capitulated to the Spanish after the French troops in the city were reduced to starvation. The surrender negotiations were marred by French bluffs to blow up the fortifications and Spanish threats to massacre the garrison, neither of which occurred. Pamplona is located on the Arga River in the province of Navarre in northern Spain. The siege occurred during the Peninsular War, part of the Napoleonic Wars.

== Background ==
Marquess Wellington drove the French from northern Spain by his decisive victory at the Battle of Vitoria on 21 June 1813. During the afternoon of 24 June, the defeated army of Joseph Bonaparte and Marshal Jean-Baptiste Jourdan streamed past Pamplona. The soldiers were not allowed to enter the fortress for fear that they would plunder the garrison's food supplies. The following day, Victor Alten's British cavalry brigade appeared before Pamplona, followed by the infantry of the Anglo-Portuguese Light Division. One authority stated that the blockade around Pamplona was set up on 25 June. A second source asserted that 26 June was the date that Pamplona was invested. On 26 June, Wellington intended to close off Pamplona on the south side with the Light and 4th Divisions and on the north side by the 3rd and 7th Divisions. However, the British army commander found that he had a chance to cut off Bertrand Clausel's divisions, so he sent the Light and 4th Divisions marching after the French. The 3rd and 7th Divisions were ordered to follow the other two divisions when Rowland Hill's corps arrived to relieve them.

There was a brief opportunity for Wellington to launch an all-out pursuit of Joseph and Jourdan's broken army by invading southern France. There were several reasons why Wellington did not try this, though some of his officers expected it. The paramount reason was that the Russian Empire and the Kingdom of Prussia had signed the Truce of Pläswitz with Napoleon on 4 June. If Russia and Prussia made a permanent peace with the French Empire, then Wellington would have to give up any possible territorial gains that he made in France. As it happened, the Truce ended on 11 August and the Austrian Empire joined the Allies, though Wellington did not know this until 7 September. Other reasons were that the British and Portuguese had not fully established their new supply line via the port of Santander, the army was experiencing serious straggling and there was political trouble with the Cortes of Cádiz.

Wellington's offensive that ended at Vitoria began in late May. While his army was preparing to lunge forward, four French divisions under Clausel were far away in the Pyrenees trying to hunt down Francisco Espoz y Mina and his Spanish guerillas. On 12–13 May, Clausel attacked Mina's base at Roncal but the guerilla leader escaped its destruction and the subsequent French pursuit. Meanwhile, Clausel's troops were not available to help the main French army opposing Wellington. Joseph sent Clausel a note asking for the return of three borrowed divisions on 27 May, but Clausel's column only appeared in the neighborhood of Vitoria a day after the decisive battle. Belatedly realizing the situation, the French general immediately began to retreat. On 26 June, intelligence was received that Clausel's column was within reach, prompting Wellington to order a pursuit.

== Siege ==
=== June–July ===
After a few days of hard marching, Wellington gave up the futile chase of Clausel's column on 29 June and turned his four divisions back toward Pamplona. The Portuguese and the British 2nd Divisions under Hill left Pamplona on 2 July and headed north. The 7th and Light Divisions followed Hill's corps on 3 and 4 July respectively. This left the 3rd, 4th and 6th Divisions under the command of George Ramsay, 9th Earl of Dalhousie to carry on the blockade. Since O'Donnell's 11,000 men of the Army of Reserve of Andalusia had recently forced the surrender of the Pancorbo forts, on 2 July Wellington ordered the Spaniard to bring his troops to blockade Pamplona.

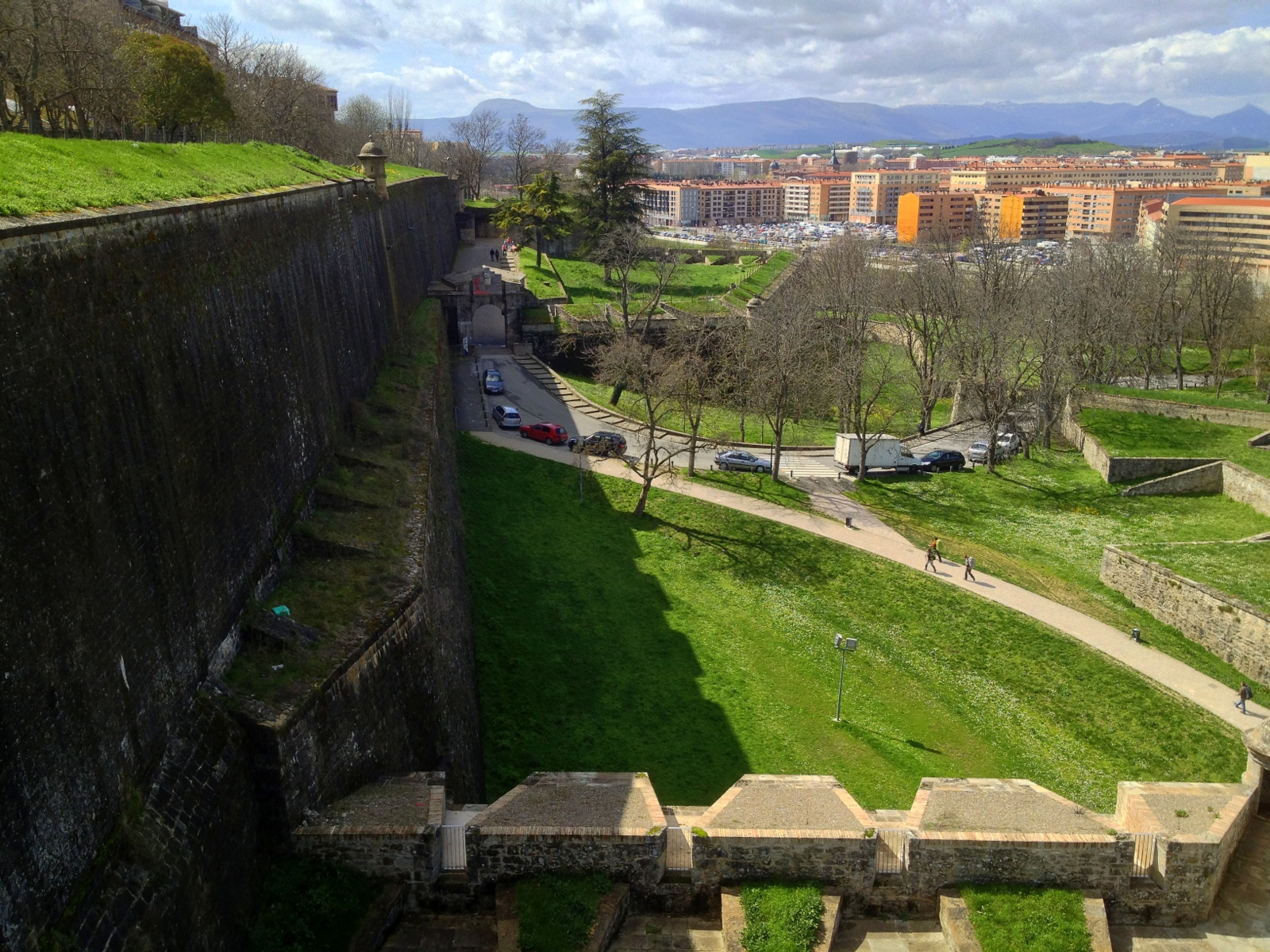
The old Pamplona walls are still preserved.

Before his operations against Mina in May, Clausel had deposited 54 field guns in the fortress at Pamplona. On 15 June a convoy arrived from France with food for 2,500 men for 77 days. After wrecking Mina's base, Clausel returned to Pamplona on 18 June, leaving Cassan and a garrison that included the 1st and 2nd Battalions of the 52nd Line Infantry Regiment, the 4th Battalion of the 117th Line and 800 men from the 3rd Legion of Gendarmerie. When his beaten army passed Pamplona, Joseph and Jourdan sent their unfit and sick soldiers into the fortress, as well as 40 men captured from the 71st Foot at Vitoria. These were soon joined by several hundred stragglers which Cassan organized into a "battalion of detachments". At the start of the siege he commanded a garrison of 3,800 soldiers and 80 heavy guns mounted on the walls.

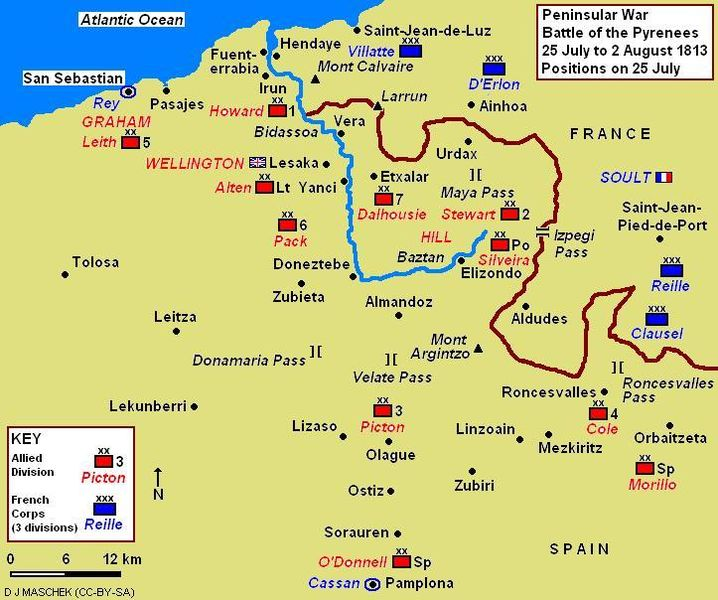
Battle of the Pyrenees - 25 July 1813 with Pamplona at lower center

While the Anglo-Portuguese divisions blockaded the town, military engineers constructed nine redoubts at a distance of 1,200 to 1,500 yards from the fortress, each redoubt being garrisoned by 200–300 men and equipped with field guns captured at Vitoria. O'Donnell's troops arrived at Pamplona on 12 July, releasing Dalhousie's three Anglo-Portuguese divisions for field operations. O'Donnell's 14,183 soldiers were organized into two divisions of infantry under Generals Creagh and Echevarri and a brigade of cavalry led by General Barcena. Creagh had 6,454 men in seven battalions, Echevarri commanded 6,617 soldiers in seven battalions, Barcena led 828 troopers in two regiments, and there were 284 artillerists.

The fortress of Pamplona sat on the south bank of the Arga River, surrounded by walls. A powerful citadel was located on the south side of the fortress. Two outlying forts were abandoned and demolished by Cassan because they required over-large garrisons. Wellington insisted that no formal siege be undertaken and refused to send any of his heavy artillery pieces to reinforce O'Donnell's 12 field pieces. The Allied siege guns were reserved for the Siege of San Sebastián. The Spanish blockade was maintained by setting up an inner cordon of pickets around the city. The outer cordon incorporated fortified villages and the nine redoubts constructed by the engineers, each armed with two cannons. So effective was the blockade that not one communication passed between the garrison and Marshal Soult.

On 26 July, Cassan's garrison heard the distant sounds of battle to the northeast in the direction of Roncevaux Pass. The noise came from a skirmish fought between Clausel's corps and Lowry Cole's 4th Division at Lizoáin. The next day, Thomas Picton's 3rd Division and Pablo Morillo's Spanish division began occupying positions near the city, indicating that French forces might be nearby. O'Donnell's Spanish division on the south side of Pamplona marched away to join the other Allies in the afternoon. There was a brief opportunity for Cassan to march his garrison through the gap and escape to the east. However, he wanted to be in control of the city when Soult's relief army broke through, so the chance passed.

On 27 June Cassan mounted a sortie toward Villava on the north side of the fortress, but it failed to press back the Allied defenders. That night the campfires of Maximilien Sebastien Foy's French division were visible 5 miles (8 km) away. The Battle of Sorauren began on 28 July but no French troops appeared and Foy's troops were blocked by Picton's. That day, Carlos de España's Spanish division arrived to plug the gap on the south side of Pamplona. The next day was quiet, but on 30 July there were noises of another battle. As the day wore on, the sounds receded to the northwest and it was clear that Soult's relief army was retreating.

=== August–October ===
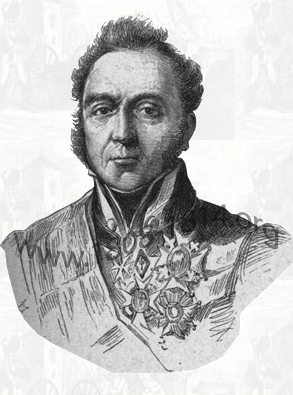
Carlos de España

Despite the great disappointment of witnessing the failed relief of the city, Cassan managed to hold his soldiers to their duty for three more months. The Spanish sent emissaries to the garrison to announce Allied victories at the Battle of San Marcial on 31 August and the Battle of the Bidassoa on 7 October in order to convince the French that their position was hopeless. However, Cassan was determined to hold out until his food was gone. The countryside close to the walls of Pamplona was fertile land with many wheat fields and gardens. From July through September, the lands near the city were the focus of many foraging parties sent by Cassan to bring in food. Typically, the French commander would send out a sudden sortie of 500 soldiers that broke through the inner cordon of pickets. The troops would harvest wheat or dig up potatoes until a superior force of Spanish soldiers appeared on the scene. Then the French would withdraw within Pamplona with the food that they gleaned.

On 9 September, de España was wounded in the thigh in a skirmish with a French foraging party. After there were no more crops to be gathered, Cassan launched sorties to gather firewood and horse-fodder. The French commander put his garrison on half-rations at the end of September. Cassan tried to send the civilian population out of Pamplona, but de España ordered them to be fired upon and they fled back into the city. The French eventually killed and ate all the horses of the mounted gendarmes. In desperation, the starving soldiers killed dogs, cats and rats and then dug up roots, some of which turned out to be poison hemlock. In October, there were 1,000 men in hospital, many of them ill with scurvy. At this time, a stream of deserters began tricking out of the city; these were mostly Germans, Italians, Belgians and Spaniards who had joined the pro-French forces. Cassan sent out an officer to negotiate a surrender on 24 October.

Cassan proposed to de España that he and his garrison be allowed to march out with six cannons and their baggage and be allowed to join Soult. In reply, de España insisted on unconditional surrender. Cassan then threatened to blow up the Pamplona fortifications and fight his way to the French frontier. Later, he admitted in his report to the French government that this was pure bluff, since his starving soldiers could hardly march three miles. De España countered by pointing out that there were 25,000 Allied soldiers between Pamplona and the frontier. The Spanish general promised that if the French blew up the fortress, he would order his men to take no prisoners and that the peasants would probably kill anyone who escaped. Wellington wrote a letter to de España that the French officers should be shot and the common soldiers decimated if they damaged the city.

Cassan then proposed that his soldiers be exchanged on the promise to not fight against the Allies for a year and one day. De España refused, pointing out that France was infamous for not honoring its pledges. Finally, Cassan had to accept terms which allowed his soldiers to march out with the honors of war, but lay down their arms 300 yards (274 m) from the gates and be sent to prison camps in England. Sick soldiers were also considered to be prisoners, though they were available for exchange. French civil servants might be exchanged for Spanish nationals held in France and French women, children and men over 60 years old could go free. However, Spanish and British deserters, as well as pro-French Spanish subjects (men and women) were to be turned over to their captors. Some of this group were executed by the Spanish. Supposedly a number of Spaniards escaped exemplary punishment by donning French uniforms or pretending to be French women.

== Result ==
Historian Digby Smith gave French losses as 500 killed, 800 wounded, and 2,150 captured while estimating that the 10,000-strong Spanish besiegers sustained 2,000 casualties during the siege. Charles Oman stated that, at the end of September, de España's division numbered 3,200 men and O'Donnell's remaining division counted 5,000 soldiers, while there were 700 cavalry and 300 gunners. In round numbers there were about 9,500 men. At this time O'Donnell's division was replaced by 5,000 troops led by the Prince of Anglona. Oman noted that it was fortunate that the negotiations ended in a peaceful surrender, because de España's behavior during the First Carlist War showed that he was cruel enough to resort to massacre.

Wellington believed that the Spanish besiegers were lax in allowing the French to successfully forage for food. The British commander thought that if the wheat fields had been burned and the gardens ruined that Pamplona would have fallen three weeks earlier. In fact, Cassan's ability to hold out into the autumn forced Wellington to keep Hill's corps at the Roncevaux Pass where it endured constant rain and snow that put many soldiers in the hospital. More significantly, Wellington refused to order his army to move into France until Pamplona had fallen. By this measure, Cassan performed a good service to his emperor.

== See also ==
- Siege of Pamplona (1823), a successful French siege of the city
