= Louis Pierre Jean Cassan =

- Born: 23 April 1771; Lézignan-Corbières, Languedoc, France
- Died: 20 January 1852 (aged 80) Lézignan-Corbières, Aude, France
- Allegiance: France
- Branch: Infantry
- Service years: (France) 1791–1833
- Rank: General of Brigade
- Conflicts: War of the Pyrenees; Battle of Boulou; War of the First Coalition; Battle of Millesimo; Battle of Ceva; Battle of Lodi; Battle of Castiglione; Battle of Bassano; War of the Second Coalition; Battle of Messkirch; Battle of Biberach; Battle of Hohenlinden; Siege of Porto Ferrajo; War of the Third Coalition; Battle of Verona; Battle of Caldiero; Invasion of Naples; Siege of Gaeta; Peninsular War; Siege of Pamplona; French conquest of Algeria
- Awards: Légion d'Honneur, CC
- Other work: Baron of the Empire, 1810

Louis Pierre Jean Aphrodise Cassan (23 April 1771 – 20 January 1852) became a French regimental and brigade commander during the Napoleonic Wars. In 1791 he joined a volunteer battalion as a captain. In 1794 he fought at Boulou during the War of the Pyrenees. After transferring to Italy, he served at Millesimo, Ceva, Lodi, Castiglione and Bassano in 1796. He fought at Messkirch, Biberach and Hohenlinden in 1800 and Porto Ferrajo in 1801. Cassan was appointed colonel of the 20th Line Infantry Regiment in 1803 and led it at Verona, Caldiero and Gaeta in 1805–1806. His promotion to general of brigade came through in 1811. He was later sent to Spain where he led the stubborn defense of Pamplona in 1813. After a period of inactive duty, he served during the French conquest of Algeria before retiring in 1833.
