= Battle of Sorauren =

1813 battle during the Peninsular War

- Part of the Battle of the Pyrenees during the Peninsular War
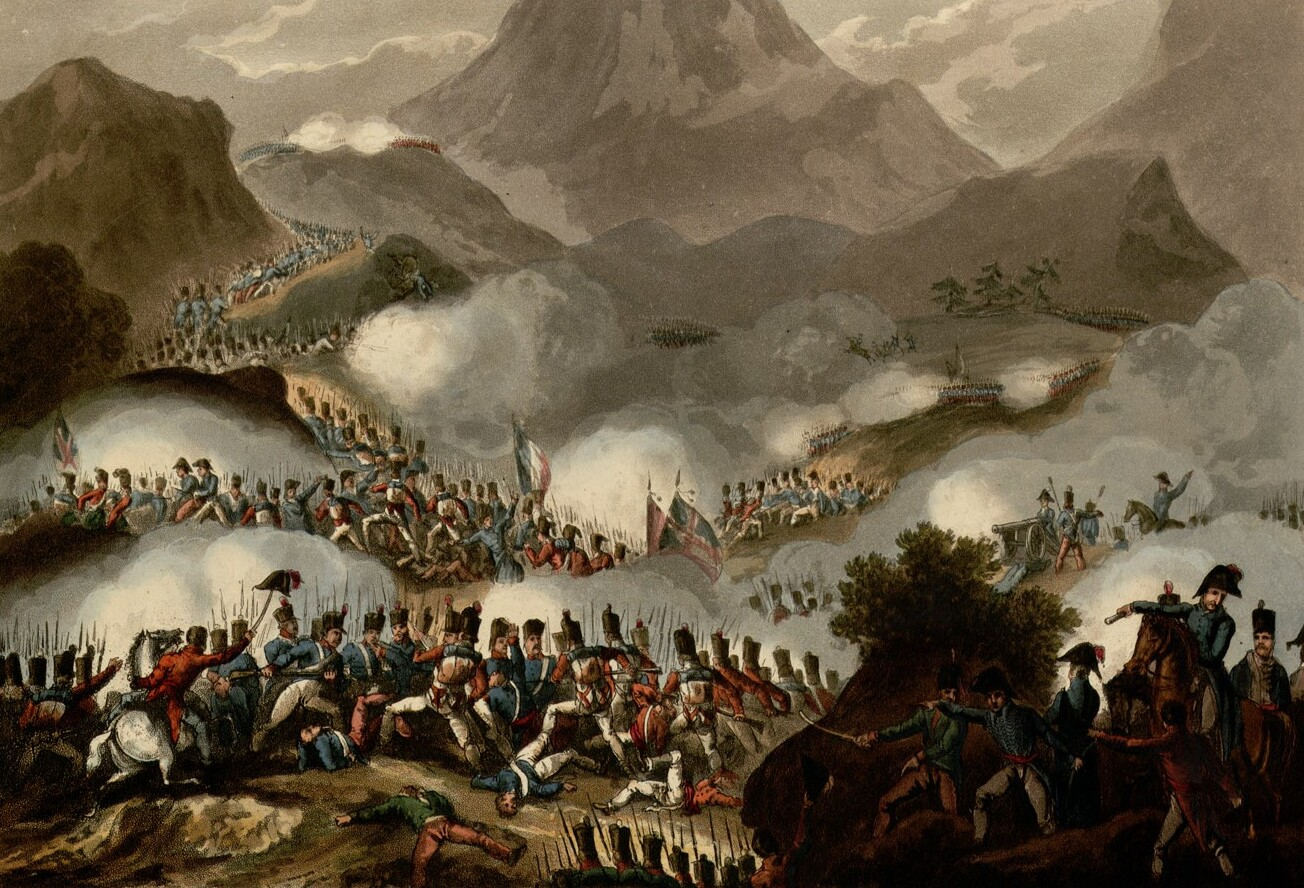
- Battle of the Pyrenees, July 28th 1813 by Thomas Sutherland
Date	28 July – 1 August 1813
Location	Sorauren, Navarre, Spain 42.8758°N 1.6189°W
Result	Allied victory

Belligerents
United Kingdom; Portugal; Spain	(France) French Empire

Commanders and leaders
(United Kingdom) Arthur Wellesley, Marquess of Wellington	(France) Jean-de-Dieu Soult

Strength
24,000 men	30,000 men

Casualties and losses
2,600 dead or wounded	3,000–4,000 dead or wounded

Peninsular War
Vitoria and the Pyrenees, 1813–1814

The Battle of Sorauren was part of a series of engagements in late July 1813 called the Battle of the Pyrenees in which a combined British, Portuguese, and Spanish force under Sir Arthur Wellesley held off Marshal Soult's French forces attempting to relieve Pamplona. In the battle, the French attacked up the slope of the Oricain Ridge and failed. Historian Michael Glover states that this defensive position was almost as strong as that which Wellesley occupied at Bussaco in 1810. He also points out that the French were nearly out of supplies in the lead-up to the battle.

== Prelude ==
With sizable Anglo-Portuguese forces tied up in assaulting San Sebastián and besieging Pamplona, the new French commander Marshal Soult launched a counterattack with the Armée d'Espagne through Maya and Roncesvalles. Although the French initially enjoyed local superiority, the tough terrain combined with stubborn British and Portuguese resistance slowed the French advance to a crawl. Before the battle at Sorauren, Soult called for his mid-day meal and afterwards refreshed himself with a short sleep. "Meanwhile Clausel was leaning against an oak tree beating his forehead with rage and muttering, 'Who could go to sleep at a moment like this?'"

== Battle ==
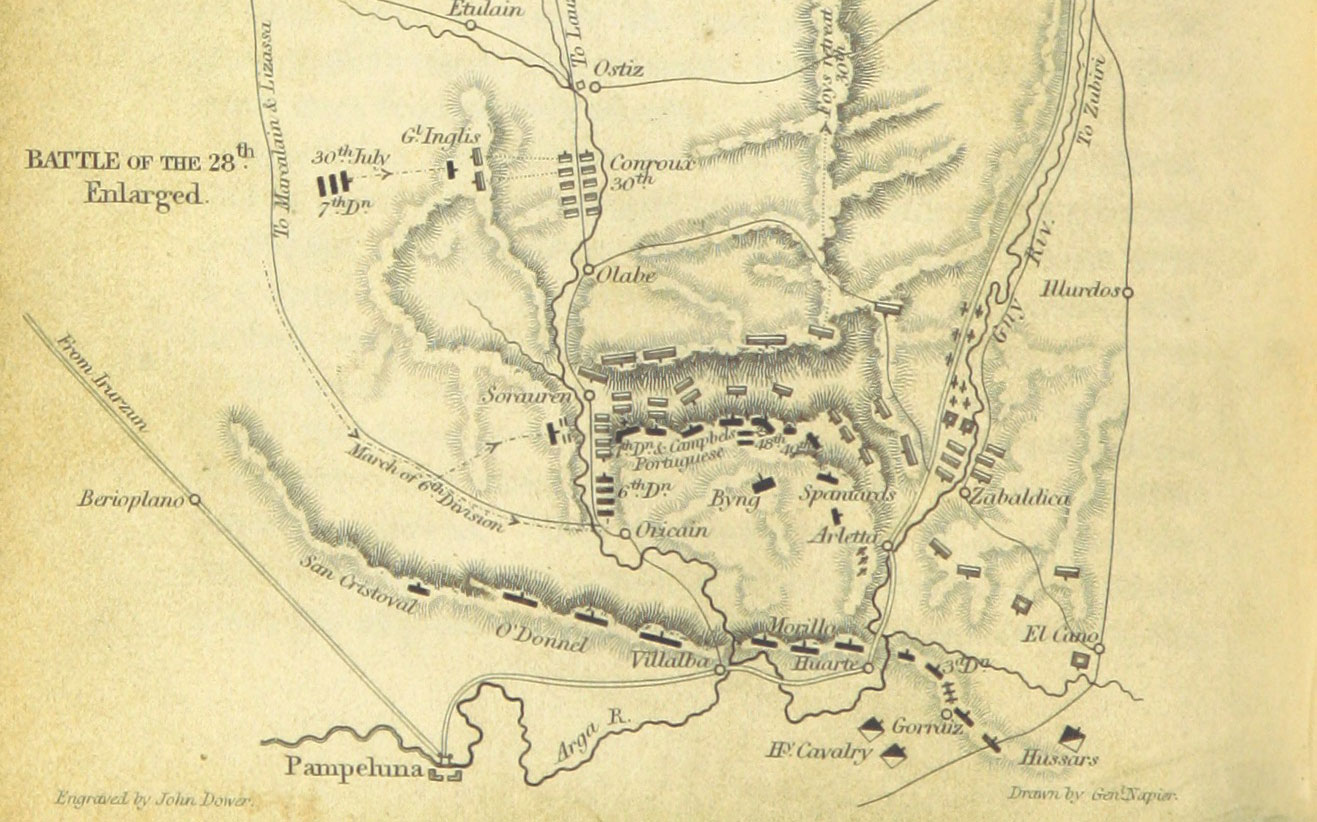
A map of the battle

The main French column of about 36,000 men under Clausel and Reille marched to attack Sorauren. On the 27 July the heavily outnumbered British forces there were drawn up on the Oricain Ridge. Wellesley made a dramatic ride along the ridge in front of the cheering British and Portuguese troops and Soult postponed the attack until the next day. By the time the French attack was launched, reinforcements had arrived, bringing the total allied force to about 24,000 men.

On the 28th the fighting at the top of the ridge was bitter and bloody, but the defenders held the French off. About midday, the 6th Division arrived and Wellesley sent them to assault the French right flank. More fresh units reached the field and Soult soon ordered a withdrawal. The French suffered between 3,000 and 4,000 casualties, while Wellesley's army lost 2,652, namely, 1,358 British, 1,102 Portuguese and 192 Spaniards.

On the 30 July the retreat from Sorauren cost the French 3,500 casualties, as they tried to get between Wellesley's army and San Sebastián. At Beunza, 5,100 Portuguese and 4,000 British fended off another attempt.

== Aftermath ==
With his momentum lost, Soult withdrew into France to prepare his defence against the imminent Allied offensive.

== Sources ==
- Oman, Charles (1922). "Section XXXVIII: Chapter V: Soult's Retreat, July 30–31. The second battle of Sorauren". History of the Peninsular War. Vol. VI. Oxford: Clarendon Press. pp. 681–706.
- Napier, Sir William Francis Patrick (1879). "Second Battle of Sorauren". English battles and sieges in the Peninsula. London: J. Murray. pp. 315–317.
- Crowe, Charles (2011). "Chapter 8, Soult Attacks". Lieutenant Charles Crowe 1785-1855 (Charles Crowe fought at the Battle of Sorauren and describes this in detail in his diary. An unedited copy is available at jjhc.info. An edited copy was published by Pen & Sword, 20011, "An Eloquent Soldier - The Peninsular War Journals of Lieutenant Charles Crowe of the Inniskillings 1812-1814") (1st ed.). Barnsley: Pen & Sword. pp. Page 121 onwards. ISBN 978-1-84832-593-7.
- Weller, Jac (1992). Wellington in the Peninsula.
- Glover, Michael (2001). The Peninsular War 1807–1814. Penguin. ISBN 0-14-139041-7.

Preceded by Battle of the Pyrenees	Napoleonic Wars; Battle of the Sorauren	Succeeded by Battle of Großbeeren
