= Etxalar =

Etxalar Etxalar Echalar
- Town and municipality
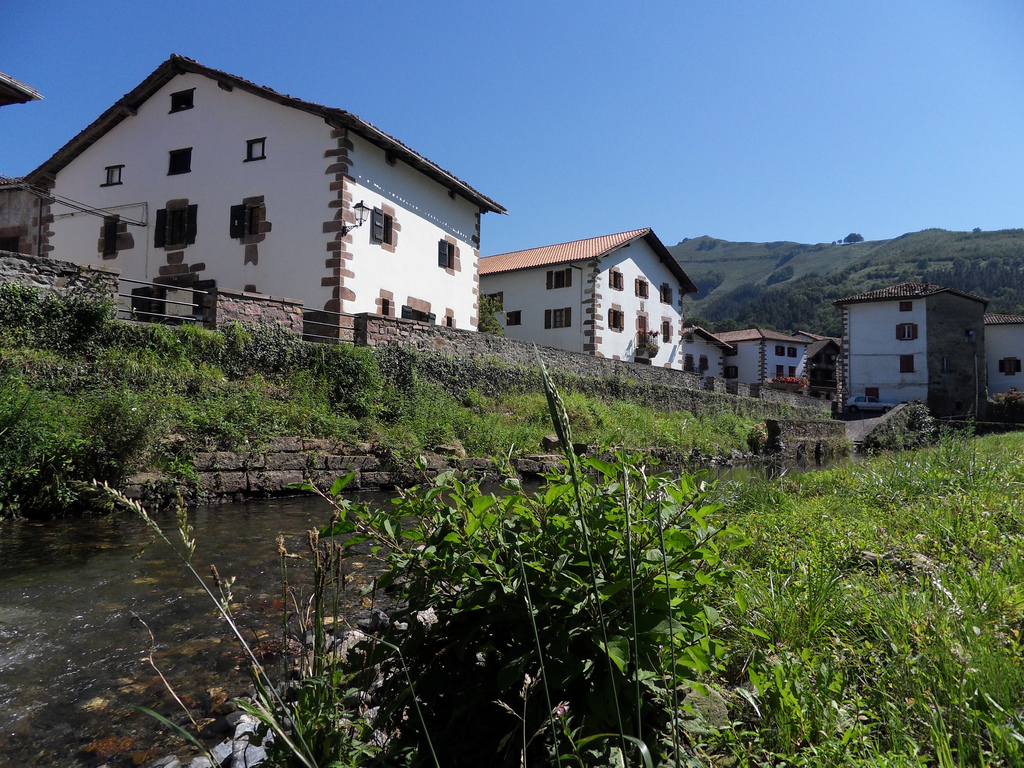
- Houses in Etxalar

- Coat of arms
- Interactive map of Etxalar
- Location of Etxalar within Navarre Etxalar (Spain)
- Coordinates: 43°14′01″N 1°38′14″W
- Country: Spain
- Autonomous community: Navarre
- Province: Navarre
- Comarca / Eskualdea: Bortziriak

Government
  - Mayor: Miguel María Irigoyen Sanzberro (Herri Taldea)

Area
  - Total: 47.05 km^{2} (18.17 sq mi)
- Elevation: 97 m (318 ft)

Population (2025-01-01)
  - Total: 807
  - Density: 17.2/km^{2} (44.4/sq mi)
- Demonym: Etxalartarra
- Time zone: UTC+1 (CET)
  - Summer (DST): UTC+2 (CEST)
- Postal code: 31770
- Website: etxalar.eus

Etxalar is a town and municipality located in the province and autonomous community of Navarre, northern Spain.
