= Sorauren =

Coordinates: 42°52′3″N 1°36′31″W

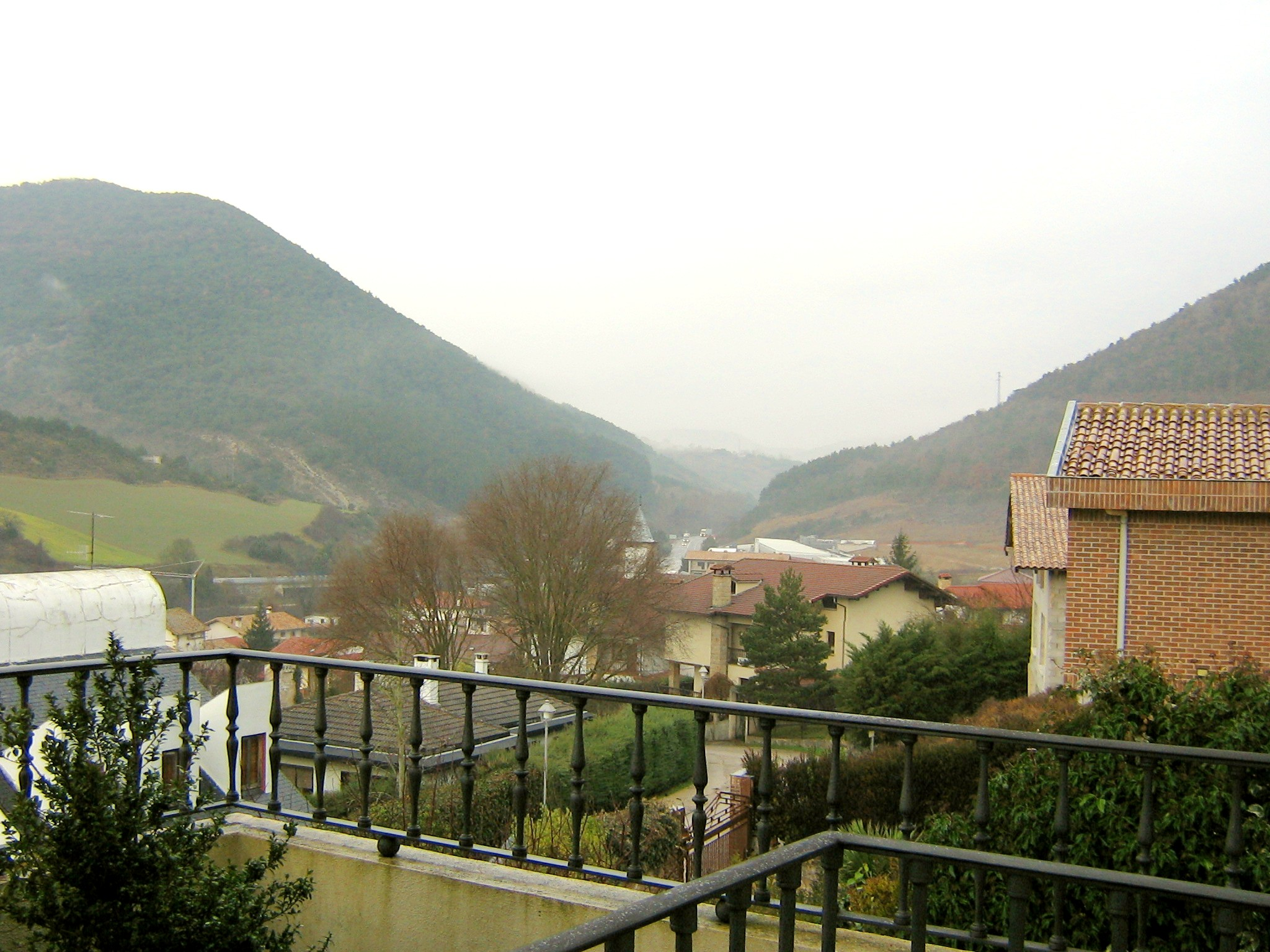
View of Sorauren, looking north through the water gap created by the Rio Ulzama.

Sorauren is a small village close to Pamplona in Navarre, Spain. It is surrounded by the mountains "Ezkaba", "Lanzador" and "Txaraka". There can be found the famous romanic stone bridge.

There are several young associations that work to improve the cultural scene like ezkabartepuntotaparte. Every September and during the summer months, there are plenty of concerts and a film festival.

== Battle ==
The Battle of Sorauren took place here between the Duc de Dalmatie and the Duke of Wellington. Legend has that both armies slept with less than 2 km (1.2 mi) between them.

A residential street in Toronto, Ontario, Canada is named Sorauren Avenue, after the 1813 battle, because the owner of the land concession in the area, Colonel Walter O'Hara, was a participant in the battle.
