= Grado =

Grado may refer to:

== People ==
- Cristina Grado (1939–2016), Italian film actress
- Joseph Grado, John Grado, and Jonathan Grado, of Grado Labs
- Francesco De Grado (fl. 1694–1730), Italian engraver
- Gaetano Grado (born 1943), Italian mafioso
- Grado (wrestler) (Graeme Stevely, born 1988), Scottish wrestler

== Places ==
- Grado, Asturias, Spain
  - Grado (parish)
- Grado, Friuli Venezia Giulia, Italy
- El Grado, Aragon, Spain

== Other uses ==
- Grado Labs, an American headphone and phonograph cartridge manufacturer
- Grado. Süße Nacht, a 2004 novel by Gustav Ernst

== See also ==
- Synod of Grado, a Roman Catholic council held in 579
