= Bayo =

Bayo may refer to:

- Bayo, Nigeria, a Local Government Area of Borno State, Nigeria
- Bayo (Grado), a civil parish in Asturias, Spain
- Bayo (film), a 1985 Canadian movie

== People with the name ==
=== Surname ===
- Alberto Bayo, Cuban Loyalist
- Getuli Bayo, Tanzanian marathon runner
- María Bayo, Spanish soprano
- Mohamed Bayo, French-born Guinean footballer
- Dellafuente, Spanish singer born Pablo Enoc Bayo Ruiz
- Zebedayo Bayo, Tanzanian long-distance runner

=== Given name ===
- Bayo Alaba, British politician
- Bayo Akinfemi, Nigerian actor and director
- Bayo Ojikutu, Nigerian author

== See also ==
- Baio (disambiguation)
- Cerro Bayo (disambiguation)
