= Peñaflor =

Peñaflor may refer to:

- Peñaflor, Chile, a commune in Chile
- Peñaflor (Grado), a parish in Asturias, Spain
- Peñaflor, Spain, a place in Seville, Spain
- Peñaflor de Gállego, a barrio in Zaragoza, Spain
- Peñaflor de Hornija, a municipality in Valladolid, Spain
