= Iglesia de San Martín (Pereda) =

- Iglesia de San Martín (Pereda)
- Location: Asturias, Spain

Iglesia de San Martín (Pereda) is a parish church in Pereda (Grado) within the Municipality of Grado in Asturias, Spain. The church was established in the 12th century, although documents show that a church was created there by Ordoño I of Asturias in 857. The building in an example of Romanesque architecture.

In 2019, the authorities included the building in the Inventory of the Cultural Heritage of Asturias; the order included over 1,000 square metres, including the 189 square metres which the building covered.

== See also ==
- Asturian art
- Catholic Church in Spain
