= Sampiro =

Leonese cleric, politician, and intellectual

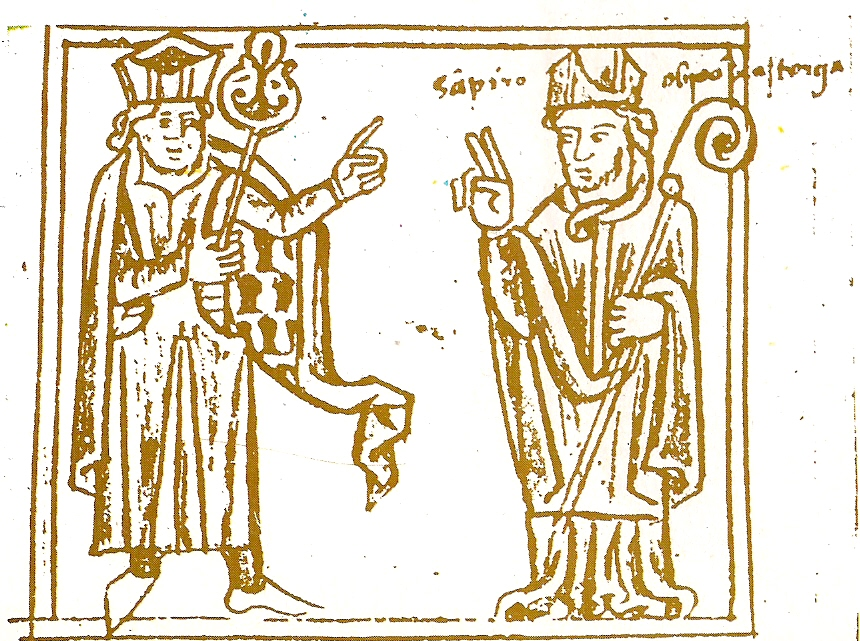
Illustration from the Códice de Batres representing Sampiro as Bishop of Astorga

Sampiro (c. 956 – 1041) was a Leonese cleric, politician, and intellectual, one of the earliest chroniclers of post-conquest Spain known by name. He was also the Bishop of Astorga from 1034 or 1035 until his death.

According to some sources he was born at Iglesia del Campo in the Bierzo, near Cacabelos, at times confused with Sorribas because at the time it lay within the latter. According to other sources he was born at Zamora. Further, it is uncertain whether all contemporary references to persons named Sampiro refer to the same individual or multiple ones.

As a young man Sampiro entered a monastery, either Sahagún or San Miguel de Camarzana. Later he fled to Zamora in light of raids from Muslim territory, and eventually found himself in the royal court at León. He served as a notary to Vermudo II (984–999) and held the highest office at court, that of majordomo, under Alfonso V (999–1028). He was appointed bishop of Astorga round 1034.

Sampiro's chronicle was composed as a continuation of the Chronicle of Alfonso III and as such relates events between the years 866 and 982, when it abruptly stops, though it was evidently written in the early eleventh century. It forms part of the Corpus Pelagianum, a series of histories each continuing the last stretching back to Isidore of Seville's Historia Gothorum. A redaction of the chronicle of Sampiro was incorporated into the Historia Silense.

Sampiro praises his master, King Vermudo, as "quite prudent [because] he confirmed the laws dictated by Wamba, ordered the opening and studying of the collection of canons, loved mercy and justice, and tried to reprove evil and choose the good." The statement about the laws of Wamba (leges a Vambano principe conditas firmavit), otherwise unknown for his legislative action, is probably an error for Egica, who made a major revision of the Lex Visigothorum and who was held by Leonese writers of the time to have been related to Wamba. The later historian Pelayo of Oviedo, who continued Sampiro's chronicle down to his own age, replaced this laudatory section with an attack on the king, bequeathing to historiography the nickname by which Vermudo II is always known: "the Gouty" (el Gotoso).

== Bibliography ==
- Alonso, Hernán (1999). El Bierzo, todos los pueblos, rutas y caminos. Ponferrada: H. Alonso. ISBN 84-605-9354-1.
- Carriedo Tejedo, Manuel (1993). "Claves cronológicas de la crónica de Sampiro," Archivos Leoneses: revista de estudios y documentación de los Reinos Hispano-Occidentales, 93–94, 233–276.
- Casado, Mar (1994). Historia de El Bierzo (Algunos personajes bercianos. Sampiro.). Instituto de Estudios Bercianos. ISBN 84-88635-02-8.
- Cavestany Pardo-Valcarce, Juan Antonio (1975). "Nota a la crónica de Sampiro," Archivos Leoneses: revista de estudios y documentación de los Reinos Hispano-Occidentales, 57–58, 203–208.
- Durany Castrillo, Mercedes and María del Carmen Rodríguez González (2004). "El obispado de Astorga en el primer tercio del siglo XI: de Jimeno a Sampiro," Semata: Ciencias sociais e humanidades, 15, 187–222.
- Durany Castrillo, Mercedes and María del Carmen Rodríguez González (2004). "Puntualizaciones sobre la dotación de algunos documentos de la Catedral de Astorga del Primer Tercio del Siglo XI: De Jimeno a Sampiro," Estudios humanísticos: Historia, 3, 275–302.
- Fernandez Vallina, Emiliano (1978). "Sampiro y el llamado Silense," Helmantica: Revista de filología clásica y hebrea, 29(88), 51–60.
- Grassotti, Hilda (1966). "Simancas: problemas e hipótesis," Anuario de estudios medievales, 3, 425–440.
- Isla Frez, Amancio (1997). "La monarquía leonesa según Sampiro," Historia social, pensamiento historiográfico y Edad Media: homenaje al Prof. Abilio Barbero de Aguilera, ed. María Isabel Loring García, 33–57. ISBN 84-7923-123-8.
- López Valle, Melchor (2004). Castro Bergidum. El Mayor Asentamiento Castreño Berciano. Imprenta Grama (Ponferrada). ISBN 978-84-88635-42-6.
- Martínez Angel, Lorenzo (2000). "Sobre un posible error en la fecha de la muerte del Obispo Sampiro de Astorga en los Obituarios de la Catedral de León," Astórica: revista de estudios, documentación, creación y divulgación de temas astorganos, 17(19), 245–250.
- Martínez Angel, Lorenzo (2006). "Dos notas sobre los obituarios medievales de la Catedral de León: una posible influencia de la crónica de Sampiro y la presencia en los mismos de la palabra 'luna'," Iacobus: revista de estudios jacobeos y medievales, 21–22, 157–168.
- Monsalve Figueiredo, Alejandro (2008). "Sampiro: un cronista y una época de la monarquía astur-leonesa," Historia Abierta, 41, 28–30.
- Pérez de Urbel, Justo (1951). "Pelayo de Oviedo y Sampiro de Astorga," Hispania, 11(44), 387–412.
- Pérez de Urbel, Justo (1952). Sampiro: su crónica y la monarquía leonesa en el siglo X. Madrid: Diana artes gráficas.
- Quintana Prieto, Augusto (1968). "San Miguel de Camarzana y su 'scriptorium'," Anuario de estudios medievales, 5, 65–95.
- Quintana Prieto, Augusto (1978). "Sampiro, Alón y Arnaldo: Tres obispos de Astorga, cronistas del reino de León," León medieval: doce estudios: ponencias y comunicaciones presentadas al coloquio "El reino de León en la Edad Media", 57–68. ISBN 84-600-1273-5.
- Ruiz Asencio, José Manuel (1973). "La inclusión del Chronicon de Sampiro en la Historia Silense," Archivos Leoneses: revista de estudios y documentación de los Reinos Hispano-Occidentales, 54, 279–286.
- Tomé, Javier et al. (2007). Las Edades del Bierzo. El Diario de León.
- Velho, Martín (1980). "Exegese da terceira parte do 14 do cronicon de Sampiro," Boletín del Real Instituto de Estudios Asturianos, 34(99), 267–278.

| Preceded by Peter | Bishop of Astorga; 1034/5 – 1041 | Succeeded by Pedro Gundulfiz |
