= Capilla de los Dolores (Grado) =

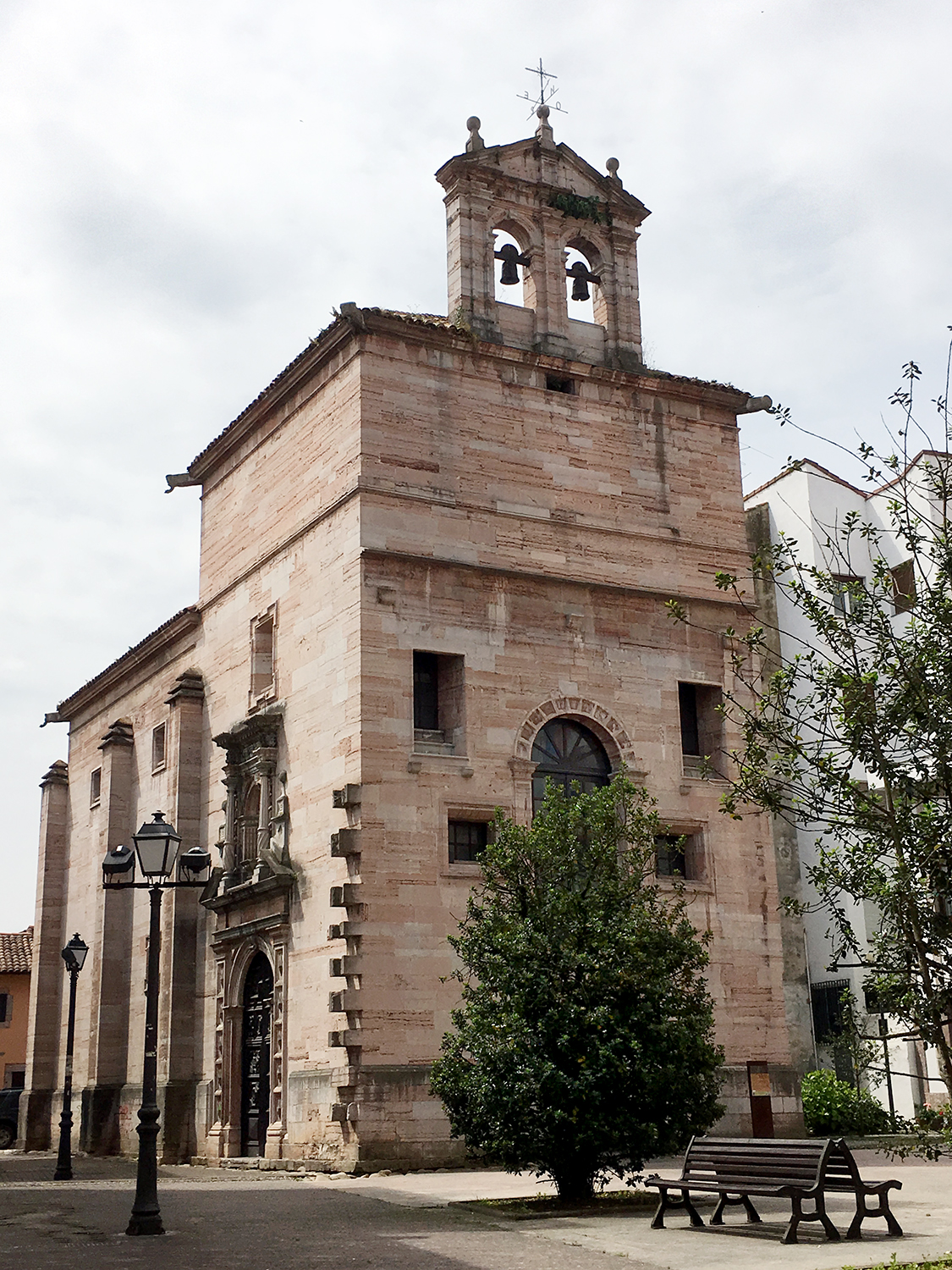
- Capilla de los Dolores (Grado)
- 43°23′23″N 6°04′06″W
- Location: Grado, Asturias
- Country: Spain

Architecture
- Groundbreaking: 1713
- Completed: 1716

Capilla de los Dolores (Grado) is a church in Grado, Asturias, in northern Spain. The chapel is listed as a historical monument.

It was ordered to be built in 1713 by the third Marquis of Valdecarzana, Sancho de Miranda Ponce de León y Trelles, and was completed in 1716.

== See also ==
- Asturian art
- Catholic Church in Spain
