= Tolinas =

- Parish
- Location within Spain
- Country: Spain
- Autonomous community: Asturias
- Province: Asturias
- Municipality: Grado

Tolinas is one of 28 parishes (administrative divisions) in the municipality of Grado, within the province and autonomous community of Asturias, in northern Spain.

The population is 9 (INE 2023).

== Villages and hamlets ==
=== Villages ===
- Tolinas

=== Hamlets ===
- L'Armitán
- L'Auteiru
- La Calea
- Corros
- La Cortina
- El Cuadriellu
- La Fontana
- Solacapilla
