= San Adrianu (Grado) =

- Parish
- Location within Spain
- Country: Spain
- Autonomous community: Asturias
- Province: Asturias
- Municipality: Grado

San Adrianu (Asturian pronunciation: [ˈsaŋ aˈðɾjanu], officially and in Asturian, also known as Santo Adriano del Monte in Spanish) is one of 28 parishes (administrative divisions) in the municipality of Grado, within the province and autonomous community of Asturias, in northern Spain.

The village of San Adrianu had been completely uninhabited since 1981, but in the 2020s a single resident (a descendant of former inhabitants) settled there and took charge of its upkeep, particularly the road access.

== Villages and hamlets ==
=== Villages ===
- La Condesa
- San Adrianu

=== Hamlets ===
- El Fondil
- L'Ortigal
