= Las Villas (Grado) =

- Parish
- Location within Spain
- Country: Spain
- Autonomous community: Asturias
- Province: Asturias
- Municipality: Grado

Las Villas (Asturian pronunciation: [laz ˈbiʎas]) is one of 28 parishes (administrative divisions) in the municipality of Grado, within the province and autonomous community of Asturias, in northern Spain.

The population is 27 (INE 2007).

== Villages and hamlets ==
=== Villages ===
- Noceda
- Las Villas

=== Hamlets ===
- La Calea
- El Campu
- El Castru
- La Cueña
- Entelaiglesia
- La Mata
- La Paraxuga
- Los Portales
- El Portiellu
- El Ribeiru
- La Zurraquera
