= Báscones =

- Parish
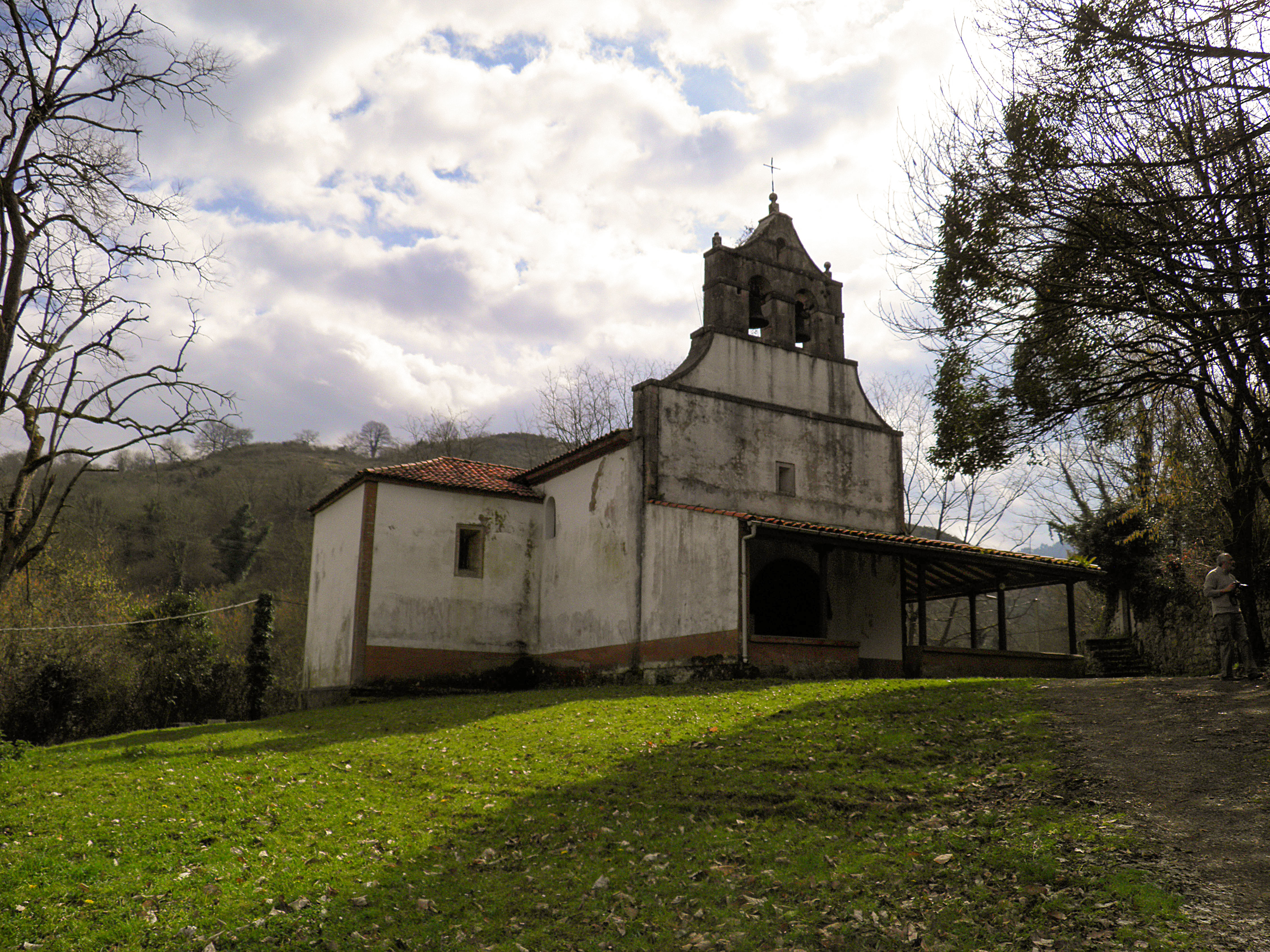

- Location within Spain
- Country: Spain
- Autonomous community: Asturias
- Province: Asturias
- Municipality: Grado

Báscones is one of 28 parishes (administrative divisions) in the municipality of Grado, within the province and autonomous community of Asturias, in northern Spain.

The population is 266 (INE 2007).

== Villages and hamlets ==
=== Villages ===
- Báscones
- Belandres
- Borondes
- Fuexu
- Las Casucas
- Las Casas del Monte
- Nalió
- Nores

=== Hamlets ===
- Barru
- Broxugu
- Cimavilla
- El Castru
- El Conventu
- El Cubión
- El Fosalgueiru
- El Molín
- El Muriu
- El Palaciu
- El Peñéu
- El Pinal
- El Valláu de Baxu
- El Ventorru
- El Xugueiru
- Foncagón
- Fuexu Baxu
- Fuexu Riba
- L'Arrecín
- L'Artaosa
- La Cabaña
- La Casanueva
- La Casuca
- La Conchana
- La Fabariega
- La Moral
- La Mortera
- La Ochava
- La Teyera
- Las Campas
- Los Carbayinos
- Sorovalles
