= Castañéu (Grado) =

- Parish
- Location within Spain
- Country: Spain
- Autonomous community: Asturias
- Province: Asturias
- Municipality: Grado

Castañéu is one of 28 parishes (administrative divisions) in the municipality of Grado, within the province and autonomous community of Asturias, in northern Spain.

The population is 251 (INE 2007).

== Villages and hamlets ==
=== Villages ===
- El Barriu Azul
- El Bravucu
- Bustiellu
- Cadenáu
- El Campu'l Cura
- Las Casas de Baxu
- La Foxaca
- La Matiega
- El Molín d'Agostu
- Morana
- Vistalegre
- Picarosu
- La Quintana
- El Tarreiru

=== Hamlets ===
- La Barzaniella
- Cangas
- La Morana
- La Cantera
- La Casona
- El Polléu
- La Quintana'l Xilu
