= Santa María Villandás =

- Parish
- Location within Spain
- Country: Spain
- Autonomous community: Asturias
- Province: Asturias
- Municipality: Grado

Santa María Villandás (Asturian pronunciation: [sanˈta maˈɾia βiʎanˈdas]) is one of 28 parishes (administrative divisions) in the municipality of Grado, within the province and autonomous community of Asturias, in northern Spain.

The population is 68 (INE 2024).

== Villages and hamlets ==
=== Villages ===
- La Cabaña
- La Fuexa
- El Gurrión
- Los Llodos
- El Puente Seaza
- Robléu
- Rozallana
- Santa María
- Seaza
- Villandás
- Víu'l Pedroucu
- Víu'l Picu
- La Campusa
- Capítulu

=== Hamlets ===
- La Barrosa
- En Ca Pachín
- La Calea
- El Castru de Seaza
- El Castru de Villandás
- Cimavilla
- El Cuernu
- El Fondón
- El Llugar
- La Peña de Seaza
- La Peña de Villandás
- Vaíca
- La Villandera
- Villar
- Los Víos
