= Baio (surname) =

Baio is a surname. Notable people with the name include:

- Andy Baio, American technologist and blogger
- Ariana Baio, American journalist
- Chris Baio, American bassist, member of indie rock band Vampire Weekend
- Jimmy Baio, American actor
- Scott Baio, American actor
- Yalany Baio, Bissau-Guinean football player

Fictional characters

- Rin Baio (灰尾 凛), a character in the manga and anime series The 100 Girlfriends Who Really, Really, Really, Really, Really Love You

== See also ==
- Baio (disambiguation)
