= Rodiles =

- Parish
- Location within Spain
- Country: Spain
- Autonomous community: Asturias
- Province: Asturias
- Municipality: Grado

Rodiles (Asturian pronunciation: [roˈðiles] is one of 28 parishes (administrative divisions) in the municipality of Grado, within the province and autonomous community of Asturias, in northern Spain.

The population is 76 (INE 2009).

== Villages and hamlets ==
=== Villages ===
- Arellanes
- El Colláu
- Rodiles
- San Pedru
- Villagarcía

=== Hamlets ===
- La Cai
- La Cuendia
- El Peñéu
- Picublancu
- La Reguera
- La Traviesa
