= La Mata (Grado) =

- Parish
- Location within Spain
- Coordinates: 43.380278°N 6.0625°W
- Country: Spain
- Autonomous community: Asturias
- Province: Asturias
- Municipality: Grado

La Mata (Asturian pronunciation: [la ˈmata] is one of 28 parishes (administrative divisions) in the municipality of Grado, within the province and autonomous community of Asturias, in northern Spain.

The population is 557 (INE 2007).

== Villages and hamlets ==
=== Villages ===
- Alcubiella
- La Cai
- Campulvalle
- El Carbaín
- Las Corradas
- Cuetu
- Entelafonte
- Entelaiglesia
- Entelosríos
- La Espina
- L’Aspriella
- Las Ferreras
- El Xabiel
- Llantrales
- El Mirín d’Arriba
- El Mirín d’Abaxu
- Picalgallu
- El Pozancu
- Prioutu
- El Rebollal
- El Regueiru
- El Rellán
- Ribiellas
- El Rodacu
- Santu Dolfu
- Sobroveiga
- El Xorru
- La Zurraquera
- La Casona

=== Hamlets ===
- Las Arangas
- El Bailache
- El Bravón
- La Cabaña
- El Campu’l Vaqueiru
- El Casal
- El Castiellu
- La Cuesta Moutas
- Fanculu
- La Infiesta
- El Llanu Ribiellas
- Menende
- El Monte
- El Perellal
- Pertegón
- La Ponte
- El Pradón
- El Pumarín
- San Playu
- El Toral
- La Venta
