= Santa María Grau =

- Parish
- Location within Spain
- Country: Spain
- Autonomous community: Asturias
- Province: Asturias
- Municipality: Grado

Santa María Grau (Asturian pronunciation: [sanˈta maˈɾia ˈɣɾaw]) is one of 28 parishes (administrative divisions) in the municipality of Grado, within the province and autonomous community of Asturias, in northern Spain.

The population is 127 (INE 2007).

== Villages and hamlets ==
=== Villages ===
- Barréu
- Castaños
- Cimagráu
- Corros
- Fozante
- La Cabayeda
- La Piedra
- Llera

=== Hamlets ===
- El Quintanal
- El Requexu
- El Riegu
- El Vesqueiru
- En Ca Pachuxila
- La Casa Nueva
- La Orden
- La Veiga
- La Zarapaya
- Los Carbayos
