= Vigaña (Grado) =

- Parish
- Location within Spain
- Country: Spain
- Autonomous community: Asturias
- Province: Asturias
- Municipality: Grado

Vigaña is one of 28 parishes (administrative divisions) in the municipality of Grado, within the province and autonomous community of Asturias, in northern Spain.

The population is 18 (INE 2024).

== Villages and hamlets ==
=== Villages ===
- Vigaña

=== Hamlets ===
- La Casa Abaxu
- El Conceín
- El Conceón
- Entelaiglesia
- Pandiellu
- Piñera
- Riañu
