= Rañeces =

- Parish
- Location within Spain
- Country: Spain
- Autonomous community: Asturias
- Province: Asturias
- Municipality: Grado

Rañeces (Asturian pronunciation: [raˈɲeθes]) is one of 28 parishes (administrative divisions) in the municipality of Grado, within the province and autonomous community of Asturias, in northern Spain.

The population is 122 (INE 2007).

== Villages and hamlets ==
=== Villages ===
- La Figal
- Los Llanos
- Pandu
- Panizal
- Rañeces
- Temia

=== Hamlets ===
- En Ca la Fonte
- Castru
- Cavadura
- La Cuesta
- Farñeiru
- Minganiellu
- Moutas
- Piñera
- La Veiguina
- Xunqueiru
