= Pereda (Grado) =

- Parish
- Location within Spain
- Country: Spain
- Autonomous community: Asturias
- Province: Asturias
- Municipality: Grado

Pereda (Asturian pronunciation: [peˈɾe(ð)a]) is one of 28 parishes (administrative divisions) in the municipality of Grado, within the province and autonomous community of Asturias, in northern Spain.

The population is 204 (INE 2007).

The church of San Martín is in the parish.

== Villages and hamlets ==
=== Villages ===
- Agüera
- Los Barreiros
- El Cabañín
- El Caliente
- Cañéu
- Los Panes
- El Lloviu
- Moutas
- Pereda
- El Retiru
- Santa Cristina
- La Toba
- El Tornu
- Villanueva

=== Hamlets ===
- L'Ayalga
- El Banzáu
- La Cabaña
- La Campona
- El Cándanu
  - Las Casonas
- El Comercio
- Cuétara
- La Escaldada
- Fanculu
- La Hortona
- La Llomba
- El Meisón
- El Palaciu
- Panicera
- Paraxinas
- La Peña
- La Pingona
- El Potril
- El Regueiru
- El Regueiru Paín
- La Reguera
- La Robellada
- San Pedru
- El Tubu
- La Turria
- El Valle
- La Venta Villar
