= Ambás (Grado) =

- Parish
- Location within Spain
- Country: Spain
- Autonomous community: Asturias
- Province: Asturias
- Municipality: Grado

Ambás is one of 28 parishes (administrative divisions) in the municipality of Grado, within the province and autonomous community of Asturias, in northern Spain.

The population is 46 (INE 2008).

== Villages and hamlets ==
=== Villages ===
- Ambás
- Cubia
- Tabláu

=== Hamlets ===
- L'Adriu
- Cantuluteiru
- Las Casas d'Abaxu
- Las Casas d'Arriba
- Las Casas del Mediu
- Meruxéu
- La Nora
- La Peña
- La Pumariega
- Reboria
- El Tabazu
- Los Torollos
- El Valle d'Ambás
- El Valle de Cubia
