= Cabruñana =

- Parish
- Location within Spain
- Country: Spain
- Autonomous community: Asturias
- Province: Asturias
- Municipality: Grado

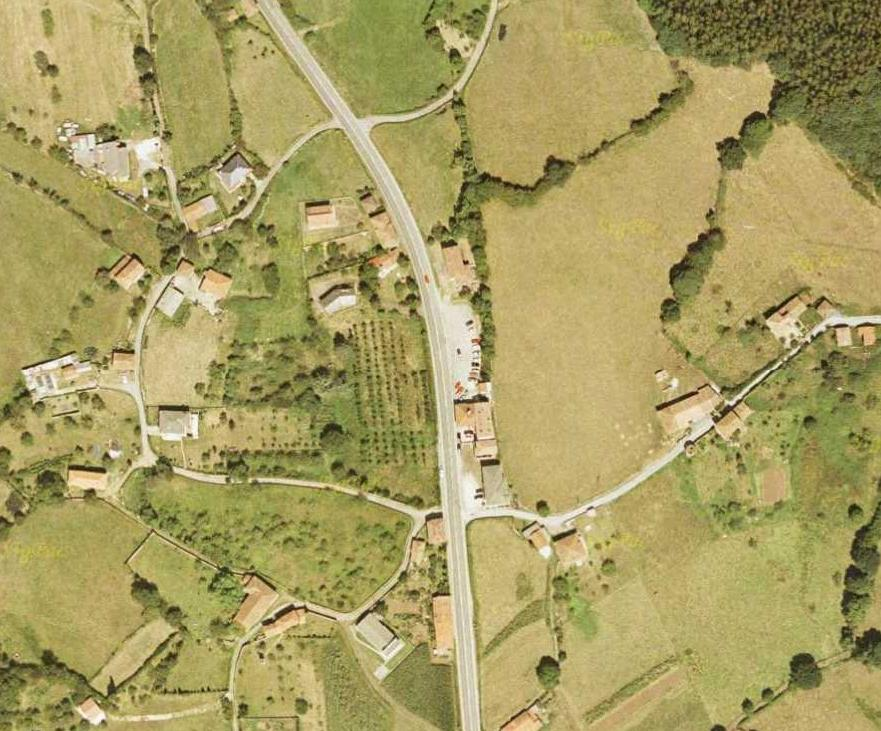
Aerial view of Cabruñana

Cabruñana is one of 28 parishes (administrative divisions) in the municipality of Grado, within the province and autonomous community of Asturias, in northern Spain.

The population is 46 (INE 2007).

== Villages and hamlets ==
=== Villages ===
- Cabruñana
- Los Llanos

=== Hamlets ===
- En Ca Pinón
- El Cabu
- La Campa
- El Cantón
- El Conceyu
- La Villa
