= Santianes de Molenes =

- Parish
- Location within Spain
- Country: Spain
- Autonomous community: Asturias
- Province: Asturias
- Municipality: Grado

Santianes de Molenes is one of 28 parishes (administrative divisions) in the municipality of Grado, within the province and autonomous community of Asturias, in northern Spain.

It covers an area of approximately 11.90 square kilometers and, as of 2023, has a population of 101 inhabitants. (INE 2007).

== Villages and hamlets ==
=== Villages ===
- Bárzana
- Campiellu
- La Formiguera
- Llamas
- El Llanón
- Momalu
- Samiguel
- Santianes
- Teixéu
- La Veiga
- Villaldín

=== Hamlets ===
- Caeiru
- Callebaxu
- Callelablanu
- Callerriba
- El Carcavón
- La Casarona
- Castrufuerte
- El Cavadón
- Cinculu
- La Escalada
- La Fuécara
- Llavián
- Las Mariscalas
- El Mortoriu
- La Quintana
- La Roza
- La Sierra
- El Valle
- El Veneiru
