= San Xuan (Grado) =

- Parish
- Location within Spain
- Country: Spain
- Autonomous community: Asturias
- Province: Asturias
- Municipality: Grado

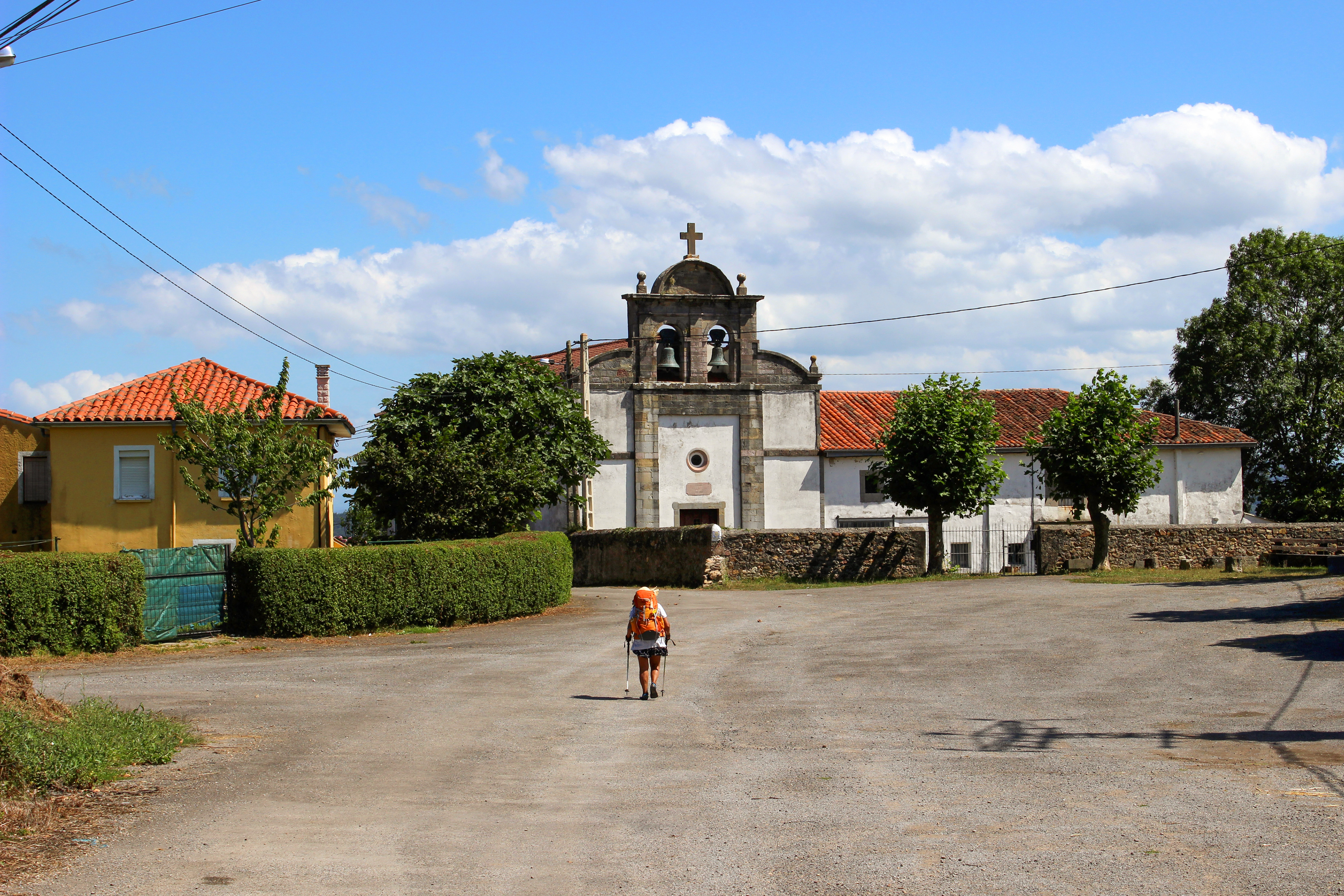
San Xuan Church

San Xuan (Asturian pronunciation: [ˈsãŋ ˈʃwãŋ]) is one of 28 parishes (administrative divisions) in the municipality of Grado, within the province and autonomous community of Asturias, in northern Spain.

The population is 169 (INE 2024).

== Villages and hamlets ==
=== Villages ===
- Acebéu
- La Barraca d'Arriba
- La Llinar
- La Llamiella
- Rozadas
- San Xuan

=== Hamlets ===
- El Cantarillón
- El Carbaín
- El Cascayal
- El Casoriu
- El Caxón
- El Molín
- El Rosal
- El Valle
- En Ca'l Toledu
- La Barrera
- La Braña
- La Fonte
- La Granda
- La Quintana
- La Reguera
- La Sierra
- La Venta
- Santiagu
