= Restiellu =

- Parish
- Location within Spain
- Country: Spain
- Autonomous community: Asturias
- Province: Asturias
- Municipality: Grado

Restiellu (Asturian pronunciation: [resˈtjeʎu]) is one of 28 parishes (administrative divisions) in the municipality of Grado, within the province and autonomous community of Asturias, in northern Spain.

The population is 30 (INE 2024).

== Villages and hamlets ==
=== Villages ===
- Restiellu
- La Veiga
- Villizói

=== Hamlets ===
- Ente Ca Fabián
- El Cabañal
- El Cabu
- La Casa Arriba
- El Chamazón
- L'Horru la Polla
- El Llugar d'Abaxu
- El Quintanón
