= Samartín (Grado) =

- Parish
- Location within Spain
- Country: Spain
- Autonomous community: Asturias
- Province: Asturias
- Municipality: Grado

Samartín (Asturian pronunciation: [samaɾˈtĩŋ]) is one of 28 parishes (administrative divisions) in the municipality of Grado, within the province and autonomous community of Asturias, in northern Spain.

The population is 281 (INE 2007).

== Villages and hamlets ==
=== Villages ===
- Villota
- La Caborna
- Las Casas del Monte
- Las Ordaliegas
- Campamoyada
- La Garba
- Reconcu
- Samartín
- San Playu Sienra
- Soropeña
- Somines
- La Tiera
- Veiga Peridiellu

=== Hamlets ===
- L’Airuelu
- La Carbayosa
- Las Casas del Molín
- El Cuernu
- Folguera
- Las Ordaliegas de Baxu
- Las Ordaliegas de Riba
- La Parrada
- Los Pitos
- El Quintanal
- El Rebollal
- El Ribeiru
- San Playu Baxu
- San Playu Riba
- Solavilla
- Los Valles
- Xiblouta
