= Cuaya (Grado) =

- Parish
- Location within Spain
- Country: Spain
- Autonomous community: Asturias
- Province: Asturias
- Municipality: Grado

Cuaya (Asturian pronunciation: [ˈkwaja], Spanish Coalla) is one of 28 parishes (administrative divisions) in the municipality of Grado, within the province and autonomous community of Asturias, in northern Spain.

The population is 144 (INE 2007).

== Villages and hamlets ==
=== Villages ===
- L'Asniella
- Baselgas
- Carroceda
- Cuaya
- Cuainxú
- Llauréu
- Las Murias
- Panicera
- Pumarín
- Villar

=== Hamlets ===
- El Batán
- La Casona
- El Casoriu
- La Faya
- El Palaciu
- El Pontón
- El Prau
- El Pueblu
- El Pueblu Riba
- El Pueblu Baixu
- El Sierru
- La Veiga
- La Venta
