= Berció =

- Parish
- Location within Spain
- Country: Spain
- Autonomous community: Asturias
- Province: Asturias
- Municipality: Grado

Berció is one of 28 parishes (administrative divisions) in the municipality of Grado, within the province and autonomous community of Asturias, in northern Spain.

The population is 95 (INE 2023), and there are 53 residences.

== Villages and hamlets ==
=== Villages ===
- El Llau
- La Vallina

=== Hamlets ===
- El Barriu Baxu
- El Barriu Riba
- En Ca Pachón
- El Castru
- El Peñéu
- El Pisón
- Valdetercias
