= Rubianu =

- Parish
- Location within Spain
- Country: Spain
- Autonomous community: Asturias
- Province: Asturias
- Municipality: Grado

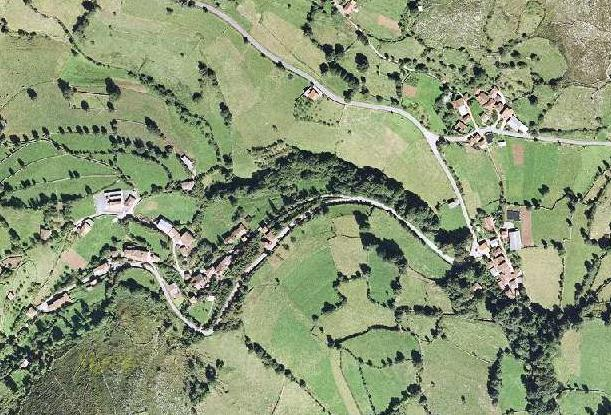
Aerial view of Rubianu

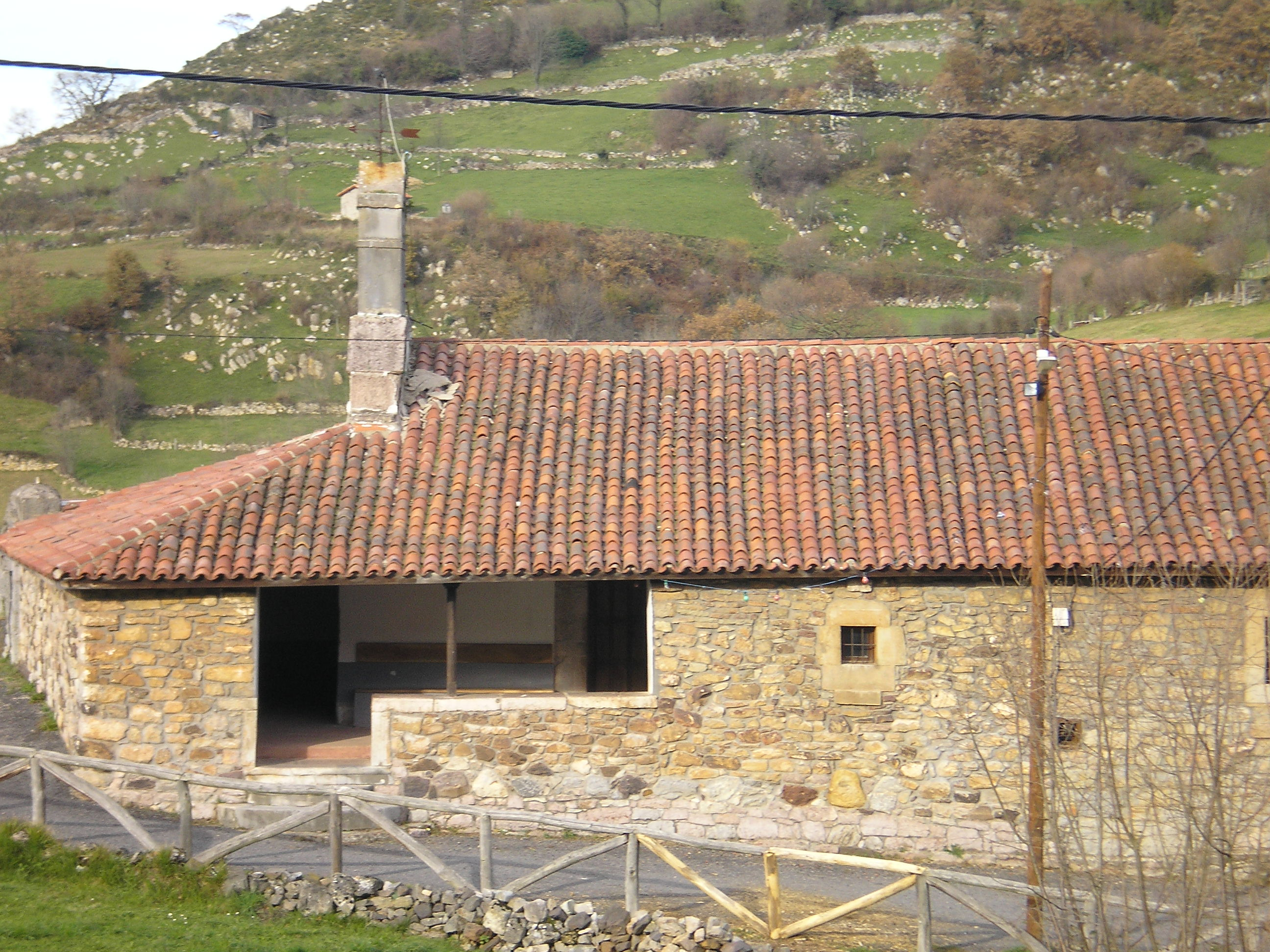
Church in Rubianu

Rubianu (Asturian pronunciation: [ruˈβjanu]) is one of 28 parishes (administrative divisions) in the municipality of Grado, within the province and autonomous community of Asturias, in northern Spain.

The population is 26 (INE 2007).

== Villages and hamlets ==
=== Villages ===
- La Calea
- Entelvalle
- Las Cortes
- El Reglal
- Trillapeña

=== Hamlets ===
- El Campón
- Entelaiglesia
- La Morada
- La Peña
- El Regatu
- El Vallín
