= Baio =

Baio may refer to:

- Baio, A Coruña, a village near Zas, Spain
- Baio (surname)

== See also ==
- Bayo (disambiguation)
- Bajo
- Baìo
