= Vayu (Grado) =

- Parish
- Location within Spain
- Country: Spain
- Autonomous community: Asturias
- Province: Asturias
- Municipality: Grado

Vayu is one of 28 parishes (administrative divisions) in the municipality of Grado, within the province and autonomous community of Asturias, in northern Spain.

The population is 155 (INE 2007).

== Villages and hamlets ==
=== Villages ===
- Vallongu
- La Calea
- El Mediu

=== Hamlets ===
- El Barreiru
- La Barrera
- Bárzana
- La Cabaña
- El Campu
- La Carbaya
- La Cayar
- La Casona
- La Carril
- Cibes
- Cogollu
- La Cuquiella
- La Enseca
- La Ferrera
- La Fraugua
- El Gorollón
- Igrade
- La Mauriña
- El Montañu
- El Picu
- La Picuada
- Piñera
- Las Piñeras
- La Pitera
- El Pradón
- El Quintanal
- La Rapegada
- La Retella
- El Rincón
- La Ruga
- La Sierra
- Sobreviana
- El Valláu de Riba
- Valsinde
- La Veiga
