= Marquis of Valdecarzana =

Spanish nobility title

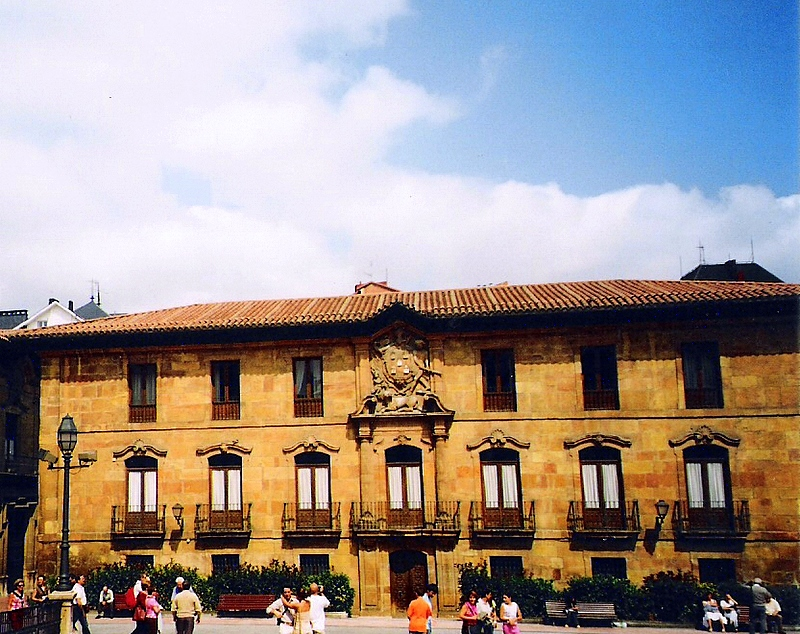
Valdecarzana-Heredia Palace, Oviedo, Asturias Asturias

The current Marquis of Valdecarzana is Jesús José Suárez de Balmaseda.
