= Grado (parish) =

Grau / Grado Grau (Asturian), Grado (Spanish)
- Parish
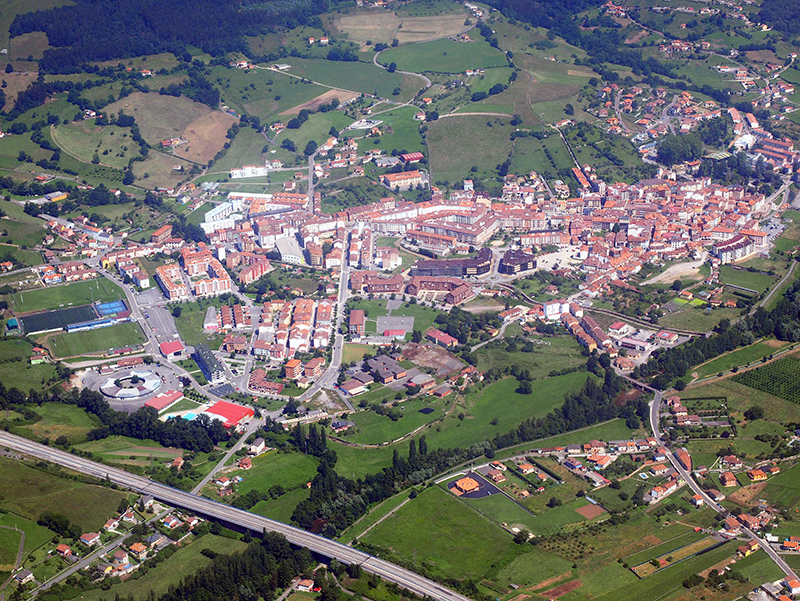
- Aerial view of the parish.

- Location within Spain Location within Asturias
- Country: Spain
- Autonomous community: Asturias
- Province: Asturias
- Municipality: Grado

Grado or Grau (official name is bilingual: Grau / Grado, Asturian pronunciation: [ˈɣɾaw]) is the capital, and one of 28 parishes (administrative divisions) in the municipality of Grado, within the province and autonomous community of Asturias, in northern Spain.

The population is 7,286 (INE 2007).

== Villages and hamlets ==
=== Villages ===
- La Barraca d'Abaxu
- La Borbolla
- Grau / Grado
- Llavayos
- La Portiella

=== Hamlets ===
- L'Abiera
- El Boláu
- Las Calles Nuevas
- El Casal
- Cimavilla
- La Cruz
- El Curatu
- Las Dos Vías
- La Estación
- La Ferrería
- L'Horrín
- Los Niserinos
- El Picu la Cuba
- La Plaza
- La Podada
- La Quinta
- La Resqueta
- Riuferreiru
- La Troncada
