= Cerro Bayo (disambiguation) =

Cerro Bayo is a mountain of the Andes range in Neuquén Province, Argentina.

Cerro Bayo may also refer to:

- Cerro Bayo Complex, a complex volcano in Argentina and Chile
- Cerro Bayo Mesa, in Neuquén province, Argentina, see Anabisetia
- Cerro Bayo (film), a 2011 Argentine film
- Cerro Bayo, a 1953 book by Atahualpa Yupanqui
