= Sorribas =

- Parish
- Location within Spain
- Country: Spain
- Autonomous community: Asturias
- Province: Asturias
- Municipality: Grado

Sorribas is one of 28 parishes (administrative divisions) in the municipality of Grado, within the province and autonomous community of Asturias, in northern Spain.

The population is 24 (INE 2025).

== Villages and hamlets ==
=== Villages ===
- Las Curuxas
- Sorribas

=== Hamlets ===
- El Babianu
- La Barraca
- En Ca Lías
- En Ca Peruchu
- El Cantu
- Carrales
- La Cogolla
- Llagu
- El Llanu
- El Miarón
- La Pachaleta
- El Portiellu
- El Retiru
- La Roza
- San Pedru
- El Troncón
- El Tubu
- Vayón
- Viña
