= Peñaflor (Grado) =

- Parish
- Location within Spain
- Country: Spain
- Autonomous community: Asturias
- Province: Asturias
- Municipality: Grado

Population (2011)
  - Total: 261

Peñaflor (Asturian pronunciation: [peɲaˈfloɾ]) is one of 28 parishes (administrative divisions) in the municipality of Grado, within the province and autonomous community of Asturias, in northern Spain.

The population is 261.

== Villages and hamlets ==
=== Villages ===
- Anzu
- Peñaflor
- Sestiellu
- Veiga d'Anzu

=== Hamlets ===
- El Barriu
- El Beu
- El Brasil
- El Carbaéu
- La Campona
- La Fontana
- Las Viñas
