= Bayo Ojikutu =

Nigerian-American writer

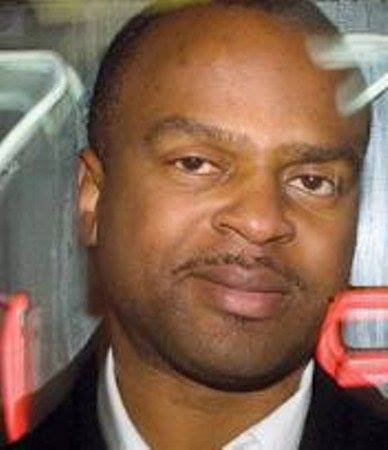
- Born: Bayo Olayinka Ojikutu; 1971 (age 54–55); Chicago, Illinois, U.S.
- Education: University of Illinois Urbana-Champaign
- Occupations: Writer; novelist; lecturer

Bayo Olayinka Ojikutu (born 1971) is a Nigerian-American creative writer, novelist and university lecturer.

His first novel, 47th Street Black (Crown, 2003), received the Washington Prize for Fiction and the Great American Book Award. Ojikutu's short fiction has appeared widely, including within the pages of the 2013 Akashic Press collection USA Noir and in the speculative fiction anthology Shadow Show. Ojikutu's short story, "Yayi and Those Who Walk on Water: A Fable", received a Special Mention nomination from the Pushcart Prize for outstanding fiction published in literary presses in 2009. By then, Three Rivers Press had released his second novel, Free Burning, to considerable critical acclaim.

Ojikutu is a graduate of the University of Illinois Urbana-Champaign. He has taught creative writing at the University of Chicago, DePaul University, and Roosevelt University.
