= Grado Labs =

American audio equipment manufacturer

- Industry: Audio electronics
- Founded: 1953
- Headquarters: Brooklyn, New York, United States
- Key people: Joseph Grado (1924–2015), Founder; John Grado, President & CEO; Richard Grado, COO; Matthew Grado, VP; Jonathan Grado, VP
- Products: Audio electronics for consumer, professional, and business uses
- Owner: John Grado
- Website: www.gradolabs.com

Grado Labs is an American audio manufacturer known for hand-building high-end dynamic open-back headphones and cartridges in Brooklyn, New York.

Grado Labs was founded in 1953, by master watchmaker Joseph Grado. The Brooklyn company is currently run by President and CEO John Grado, who bought the company in 1990 after running day-to-day operations since the 1970s.

John's son, Jonathan Grado, recently entered the company as the third generation of Grado. Grado specializes in dynamic open-air, supra-aural, high-fidelity headphones. In its over 60-year history, Grado has kept a very low profile by relying on word-of-mouth among audio dealers and consumers instead of mass advertising campaigns. Nearly all of Grado's products are made in Brooklyn, New York.

== History ==
=== Foundation and phono cartridges (1953–1989) ===
Grado Labs was founded in 1953, by master watchmaker Joseph Grado. The origins of the audio company date back to the early 1950s, when Joseph left Tiffany & Company and Sherman Fairchild to start making phono cartridges at his kitchen table in Brooklyn, NY. After seeing a market for cartridges, he went around the corner and closed the existing Grado fruit shop, opening up Grado Laboratories. Joseph went on to invent the first stereo moving coil phono cartridge while building up Grado's cartridge lineup.

Throughout his time at Grado, the company made cartridges, speakers, turntables, and tonearms, with cartridges being the only product line not discontinued. In 1965 Joseph's nephew, John Grado, got his first job at Grado and began sweeping the floors. John spent time training with his uncle, and in 1975 John started running day-to-day business at his family's company. In 1982, Joseph Grado was inducted into the Audio Hall of Fame. The peak of cartridge production took place in the mid-1980s, reaching 10,000 units a week. Their all-time low took place a few years later, dipping to 12,000 units for a year.

=== Resurgence and first line of headphones (1990–2012) ===
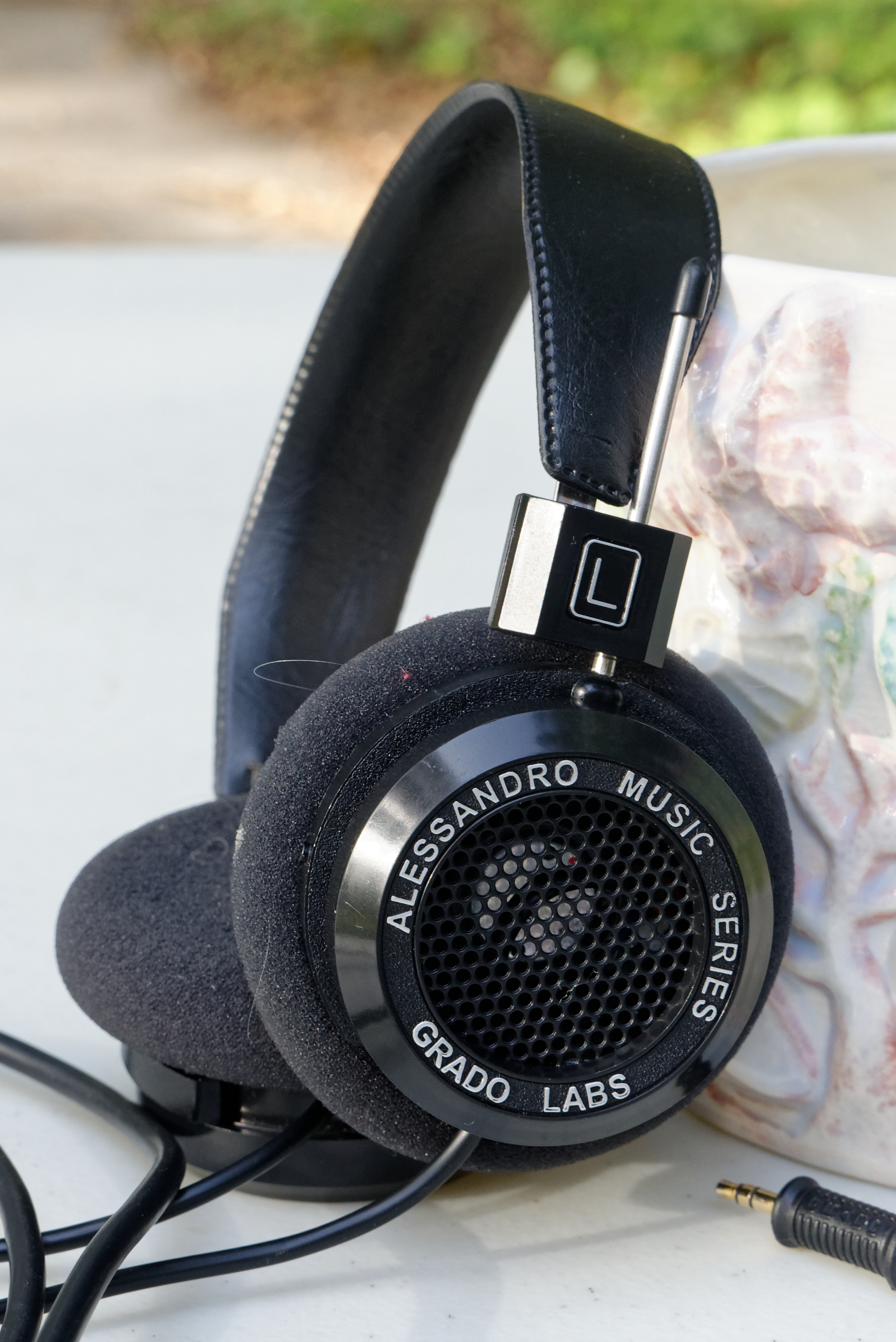
A pair of Grado Alessandro MS-1 headphones.

With the company the brink of closing, John Grado bought the company from his uncle in 1990, becoming President and CEO. John created the first line of Grado headphones, building them at a workbench with his wife, Loretta, in the early half of the 1990s. At the time, John and his family lived on the top floor of Grado's Brooklyn building. As the company did not advertise using conventional means, John would travel to audio shows around the world to promote his products. When he had established a sizable distributor list throughout multiple countries, he completely stopped going to shows to spend more time with his family. At one point, the family was going to build Grado Towers: ceiling tall speakers made of their headphone drivers. With the unexpected immediate success of their first headphones though, the speakers never made it past five pairs.

In 1994 the first wooden Grado headphones were created, and in 1996 the first wooden phono cartridge was made along with the company's first headphone amp.

In 2008 the i series of headphones was introduced, with improved drivers, cables and incremental tuning refinements.

Over the next two decades, John created over three generations of headphone lines and oversaw Grado's cartridge reinvigoration, bringing units per year north of 60,000.

=== Grado branding update (2013–present) ===
In 2013, Jonathan Grado, John's son, entered the company under his father with a goal of modernizing their brand. Originally embarrassed about his family's company, Jonathan had a change of heart in his sophomore year of college and started the Grado Facebook and Twitter pages. The hobby soon became his main focus, becoming Social Media Director over the course of his college career. After graduating and working at Sonos, he started full-time with Grado Labs. Late 2013 brought Grado's first large collaboration, creating an experimental headphone out of Bushmills wooden whiskey barrels, which Gizmodo called "warm and clear, with a sweet-spot right in the mid-range, as Grado products are known for." The New York Times also praised them, although noting they might not fit everyone's budget.

2014 had Jonathan become Vice President of Marketing, but having to get creative due to a "zero dollar ad budget". Soon afterwards in the same year, Grado was named in the Top Eight Most Social Small Companies in America by Mashable and American Express.

In 2014, Grado released their new line of headphones which had better damping, lower distortion and more neutral tuning, The e Series, was named in the Top Eight Most Social Small Companies in America by Mashable and American Express.

In early 2015, JetBlue Airways chose to partner with Grado to be their official headphone for their Mint Class flights.

Joseph Grado died on February 6, 2015, at the age of 90.

In 2015, JetBlue partnered with Grado to bring their headphones to their Mint Flights.

In 2021, Grado released the Prestige X series of headphones, superseding the Prestige e lineup. This introduced new X drivers, new cable, new headband and major efficiency and distortion improvements.

In March 2026, Grado released the new Classic series of headphones, superseding the Prestige x, Reference and Statement lineup and discontinuing some models. This introduced he new X2 drivers and new cable - softer and more flexible. In the cartridges they released the 'series 4' and also updated the logo on the cartridge.

== Current headphone lineup ==
=== Standard wired open-back models ===
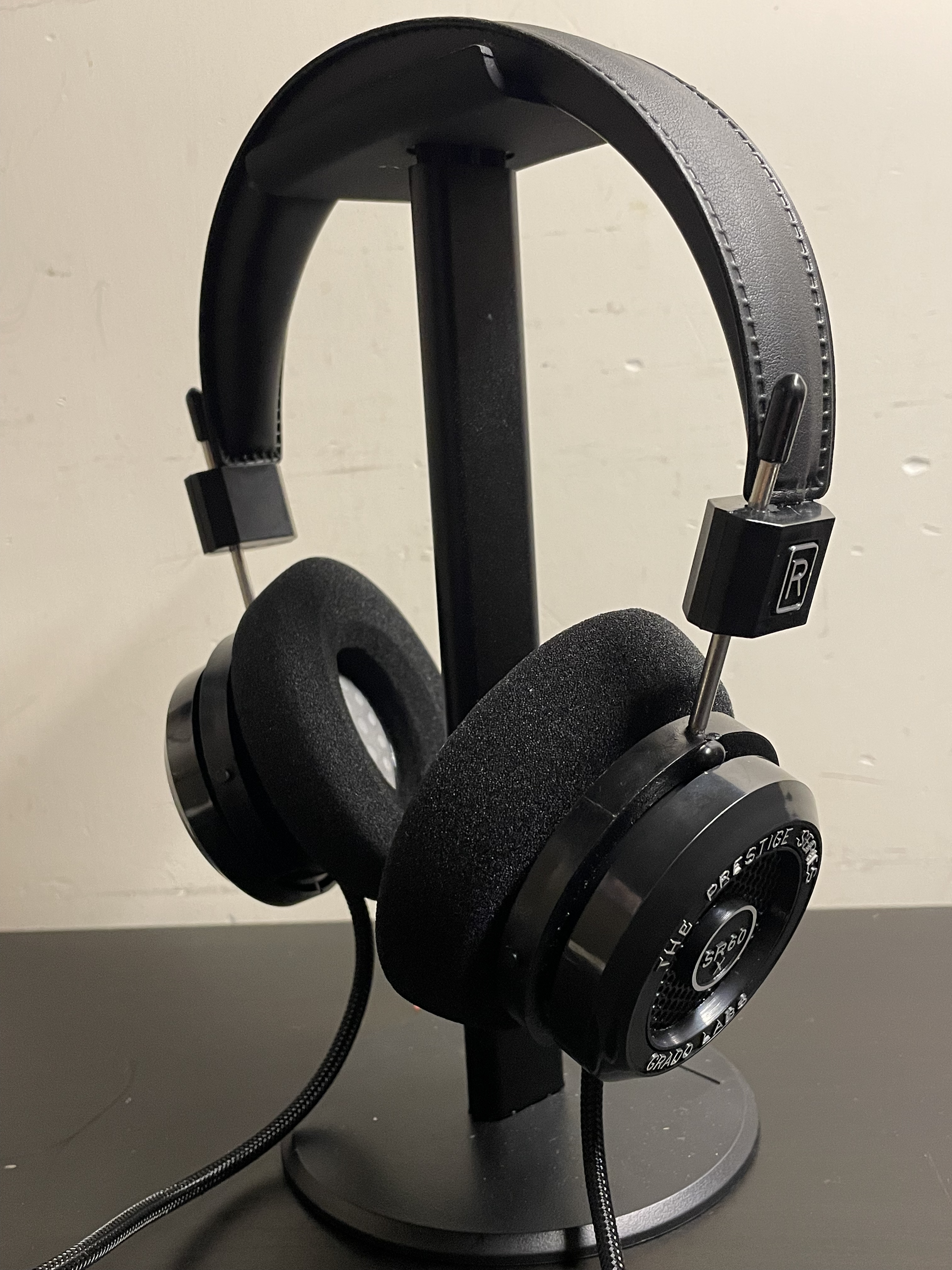
A pair of Grado SR60X headphones.

Model	Series	Construction	Notes
SR60	Classic	Polycarbonate	S pads, 44 mm drivers, 1/8" (3.5mm) plug, 0.1 dB driver matching, 4-conductor cable
SR80	Classic	Polycarbonate	De-stressed drivers. Otherwise identical to SR60x.
SR125x	Prestige	Polycarbonate	Driver voice coils use oxygen-free copper, 8-conductor cable - Discontinued 2026
SR225x	Prestige	Polycarbonate	F pads, 0.05 dB driver matching, metal rear grill - Discontinued 2026
SR325	Classic	Machined Aluminum	Leather headband
RS2x	Reference	Maple and Hemp	L pads - Discontinued 2026
PS500e	Professional	Hybrid mahogany/aluminum	Discontinued 2026
RS1	Classic	Tri-Wood - Cocobolo, Hemp, and Maple	50mm X2 drivers, metal gimbals, optional XLR balanced plug termination
GS1000	Classic	Mahogany	50mm X2 drivers, G pads, 1/4" (6.35mm) plug, large chamber, 12-conductor cable
GS2000e	Statement	Hybrid mahogany/maple	Discontinued 2026
GS3000	Classic	Cocobolo	Wooden flagship model, 52mm X2 drivers, wide leather headband
PS2000e	Professional	Hybrid maple/aluminum	Flagship model - Discontinued 2026
S550	Signature	Brazilian Walnut	50mm S2 drivers, B pads, Detachable Silver Cable
S750	Signature	Machined Aluminum	50mm S2 drivers, B pads, Detachable Gold Cable
S950	Signature	Brazilian Walnut	52mm S2 drivers, G & F pads, Detachable Gold Cable
HP100 SE	Signature	Machined Aluminum	52mm S2 drivers, G pads, Detachable Gold Cable

=== Portable and in-ear models ===
Model	Notes
eGrado	On-ear model with rear headband and SR60e drivers
iGe3	IEM: In-line mic/volume control
GW100	On-ear wireless Bluetooth model
GR8e	IEM: No in-line mic/volume control
GR10e	IEM: Flagship model, no in-line mic/volume control
GT220	IEM: True Wireless, built in controls and mic

== Past production ==
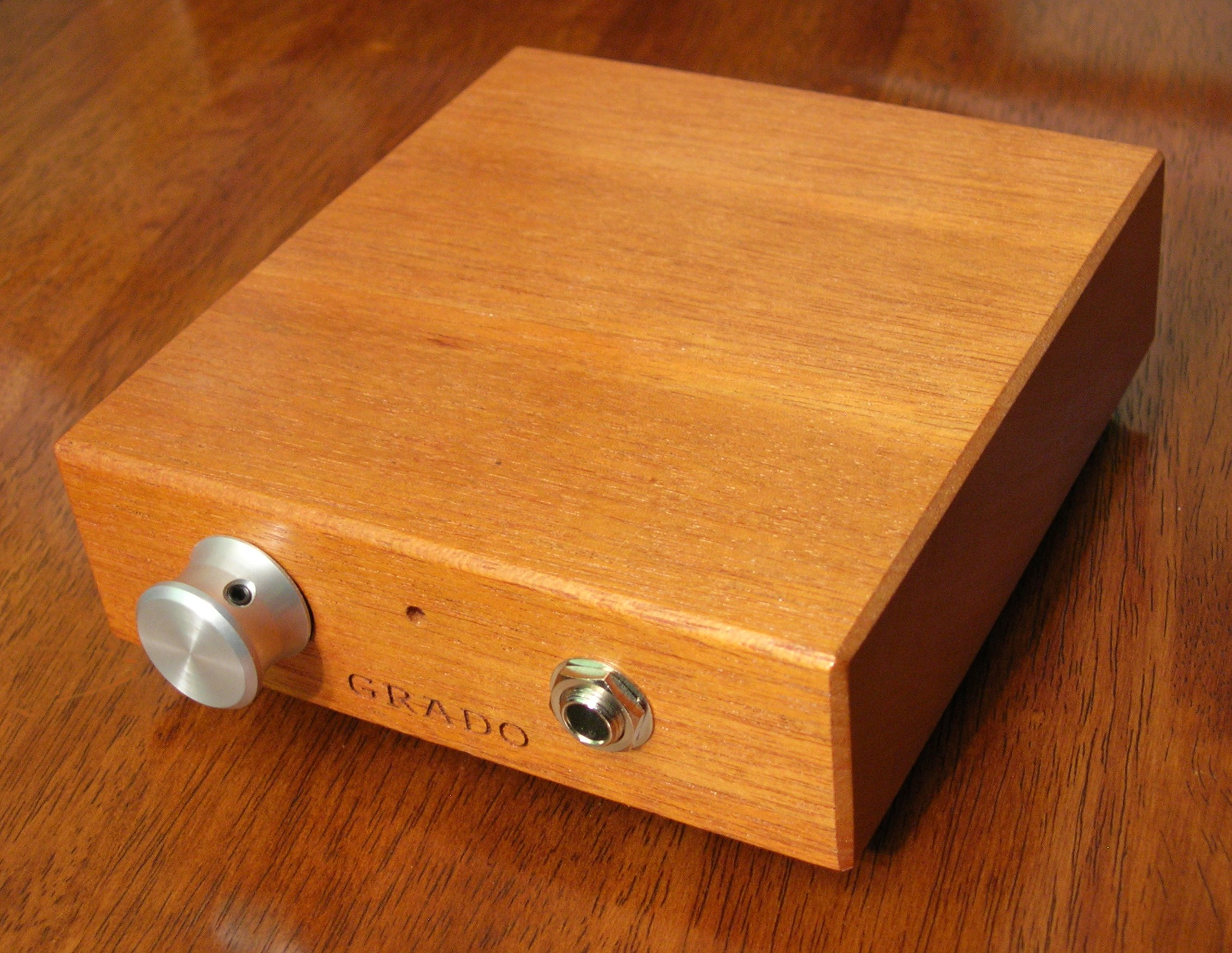
Grado RA1 headphone amplifier

The Joseph Grado Signature Products HP-1000 series headphones were limited to 1000 units produced. The HP-1000 series consisted of the HP1, which had polarity switches, the HP2, which lacked them, and the HP3, which was a short-run variant of the HP2 with looser driver matching.

Grado produced a headphone amplifier called the RA1. It accepted RCA connector input, utilized AC or DC power via two 9-volt batteries. The output was 1/8" (6.35mm), and the circuitry was encased in a wooden chassis.

Grado also manufactured an alternate headphone line for Alessandro Music Products; a maker of higher-end guitar components. Known as The Alessandro Music Series, these models have roughly the same external appearance with those from Grado, but feature a slightly different printed text and lack the identifying "button" of many lower-end Grado models. The series has said to have been designed for the musician market, and encompassed the entry-level MS1 with plastic housing, the MS2 with an aluminum driver housing, and the MS Pro, which featured a mahogany housing similar to that of the RS1.

Headphone model	Series	Construction	Notes
SR60	Prestige	Plastic	Succeeded by SR60i.
SR60i	Prestige	Plastic	Succeeded by SR60e.
SR60e	Prestige	Plastic	Succeeded by SR60x.
SR60x	Prestige	Plastic	Succeeded by SR60 - Classic (2026).
SR60	Classic	Plastic	
SR80	Prestige	Plastic	Succeeded by SR80i.
SR80i	Prestige	Plastic	Succeeded by SR80e.
SR80e	Prestige	Plastic	Succeeded by SR80x.
SR80x	Prestige	Plastic	Succeeded by SR80 - Classic (2026).
SR80	Classic	Plastic	
SR125	Prestige	Plastic	Succeeded by SR125i.
SR125i	Prestige	Plastic	Succeeded by SR125e.
SR125e	Prestige	Plastic	Succeeded by SR125x.
SR125x	Prestige	Plastic	Discontinued 2026.
SR225i	Prestige	Plastic	Succeeded by SR225e.
SR225e	Prestige	Plastic	Succeeded by SR225x.
SR225x	Prestige	Plastic/Metal Grill	Discontinued 2026.
SR325is	Prestige	Aluminum alloy/plastic inner sleeve	Succeeded by SR325x.
SR325x	Prestige	Aluminum alloy/plastic inner sleeve	Succeeded by SR325 - Classic (2026).
SR325	Classic	Machined Aluminum/Metal Grill	
RS2x	Reference	Hand-crafted mahogany	Discontinued 2026.
RS1	Classic	Tri-Wood - Cocobolo, Hemp, and Maple	
GS1000	Classic	Hand-crafted mahogany	
PS500	Professional	Hand-crafted mahogany/aluminum	Discontinued 2026.
PS1000	Professional	Hand-crafted mahogany/aluminum	Discontinued 2026.
SR40	Prestige	Plastic	A portable, made-in-China on-ear model. Succeeded by the eGrado.
SR325	Prestige	Plastic	
HP1000	Joseph Grado Signature	Aluminum alloy	First headphone model created by Joseph Grado.
SR100	Prestige	Plastic	Produced with leftover HP1000 drivers that did not meet standards. Succeeded by the SR125e.
SR200	Prestige	Plastic	Produced with leftover HP1000 drivers that did not meet standards. Succeeded by the SR225e.
SR300	Prestige	Plastic	Produced with leftover HP1000 drivers that did not meet standards. Succeeded by the SR325e.
GH3	Heritage (limited edition)	Hand-crafted Norwegian Pine	Warm and textured, body made of wood.
GH4	Heritage (limited edition)	Hand-crafted Norwegian Pine	Warm and textured, full size body made of wood.
Hemp	Limited Edition	Hemp/Maple	Warm and precise, full size body made of wood.

== Phono cartridges ==
Each individual cartridge manufactured by Grado is hand assembled and tested for frequency response, channel output, channel balance, phase linearity, inductance and resistance.

=== Prestige Series ===
The Prestige series of cartridges are designed for high output and stability under much use. A considerable tip mass reduction results in a manufacturer-reported frequency response to 50 kHz and tracking forces from 1,5 to 2 grams.

Prestige models available in both ½" mount and P-mount. 78 RPM styli are available for these models. All styli in the Prestige series are user replaceable.

=== Reference Series ===
The Reference series of wooden cartridges are a fixed coil design, handmade at Grado labs from a specially selected species of mahogany. A curing process is performed between production steps to achieve Grado Labs' desired sound. Unlike the Prestige series, the Reference series generator/stylus module is not replaceable allowing a redesigned one piece magnetic circuit and a reduction of chassis resonances. The Reference Series has been a flagship of Grado Labs since its early history.

All Reference series cartridges are ½" mount. 78 RPM styli are not available with the Reference series. All re-tipping on the Reference series is done by Grado.

== Awards ==
- Consumer Reports named the Grado SR325is as their top headphone of 2014.
- Grado Labs was named as Mashable's Top 8 Social Small Companies in America in 2014.
