= Grado, Asturias =

Grado
- Municipality
- Grau/Grado
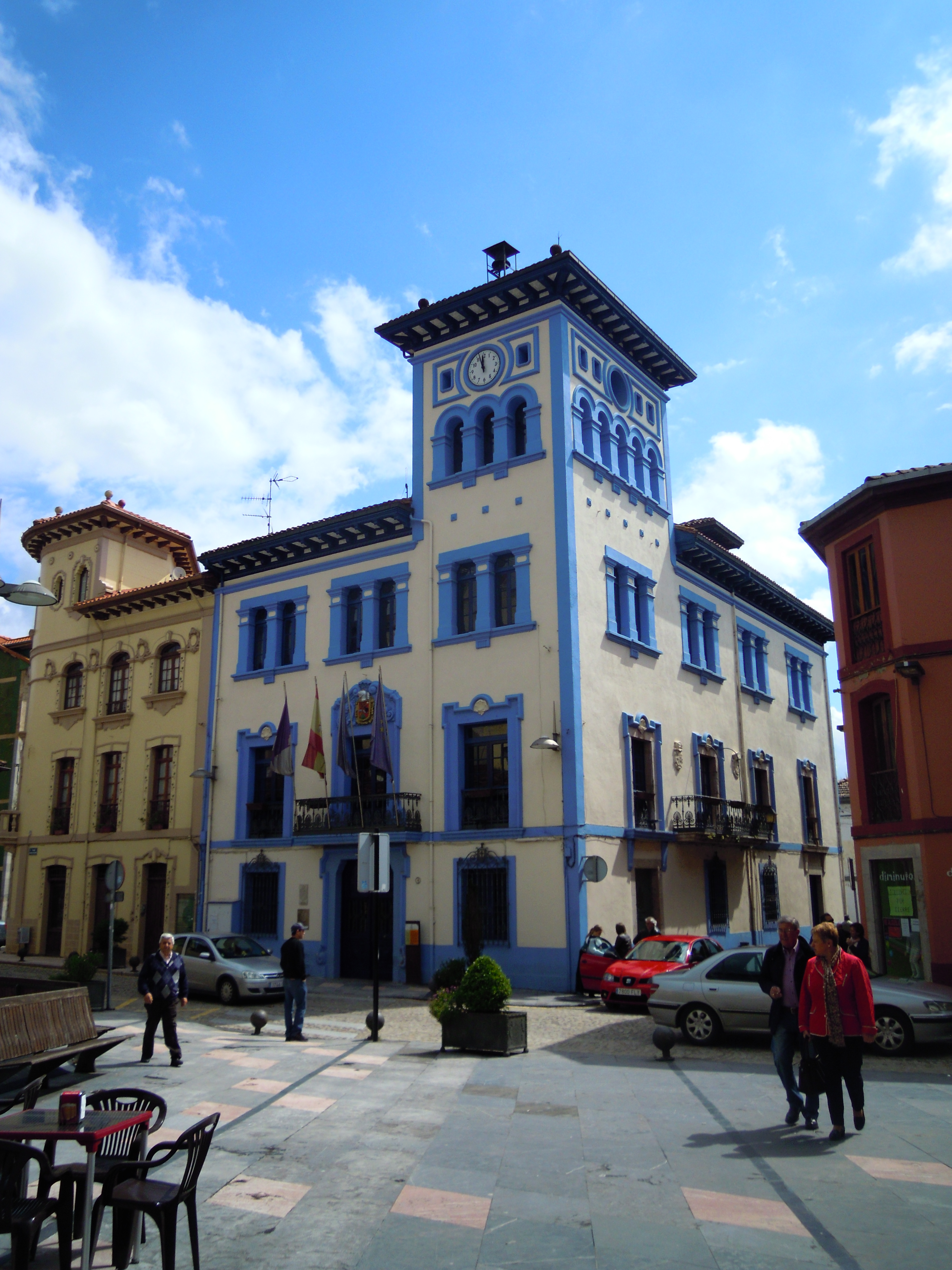
- Town hall of Grado

- Flag Coat of arms

- Location within Asturias

- Location in Spain
- Coordinates: 43°23′17″N 6°4′25″W
- Country: Spain
- Autonomous community: Asturias
- Province: Asturias
- Comarca: Oviedo
- Judicial district: Grado
- Capital: Grau/Grado

Government
  - Alcalde: José Luis Trabanco González (desde junio de 2015) (PP)

Area
  - Total: 221.63 km^{2} (85.57 sq mi)
- Highest elevation: 1,429 m (4,688 ft)

Population (2025-01-01)
  - Total: 9,681
  - Density: 43.68/km^{2} (113.1/sq mi)
- Demonym(s): moscón, moscona
- Time zone: UTC+1 (CET)
  - Summer (DST): UTC+2 (CEST)
- Postal code: 33119, 33820 to 33829, 33909 and 33928
- Website: www.ayto-grado.es

Grado (Spanish pronunciation: [ˈɡɾaðo], commonly Grao; Asturian: Grau, and officially Grau/Grado) is a municipality in the Autonomous Community of the Principality of Asturias in Spain. It is bordered on the north by Candamo and Las Regueras, on the east by Proaza, Santo Adriano and Oviedo, on the south by Teverga and Yernes y Tameza, and on the west by Belmonte de Miranda and Salas.

The municipality's capital town, also with the same name, is famous for its markets, celebrated every Wednesday and Sunday. These markets, the oldest in Asturias, have their origin in the Middle Ages, when King Alfonso X the Wise granted Grado's town charter.

== Parishes ==
- Ambás
- Báscones
- Vayu
- Berció
- Cabruñana
- Castañéu
- Cuaya
- El Freisnu
- Grau / Grado
- Gurullés
- La Mata
- Las Villas
- Peñaflor
- Pereda
- Rañeces
- Restiellu
- Rodiles
- Rubianu
- Sama
- Santa María Grau
- Santa María Villandás
- Santianes de Molenes
- San Adrianu
- Sorribas
- Tolinas
- Vigaña
- Villamarín
- San Xuan

== Natural wonders ==
- Caldoveiro Peak

== Gallery ==
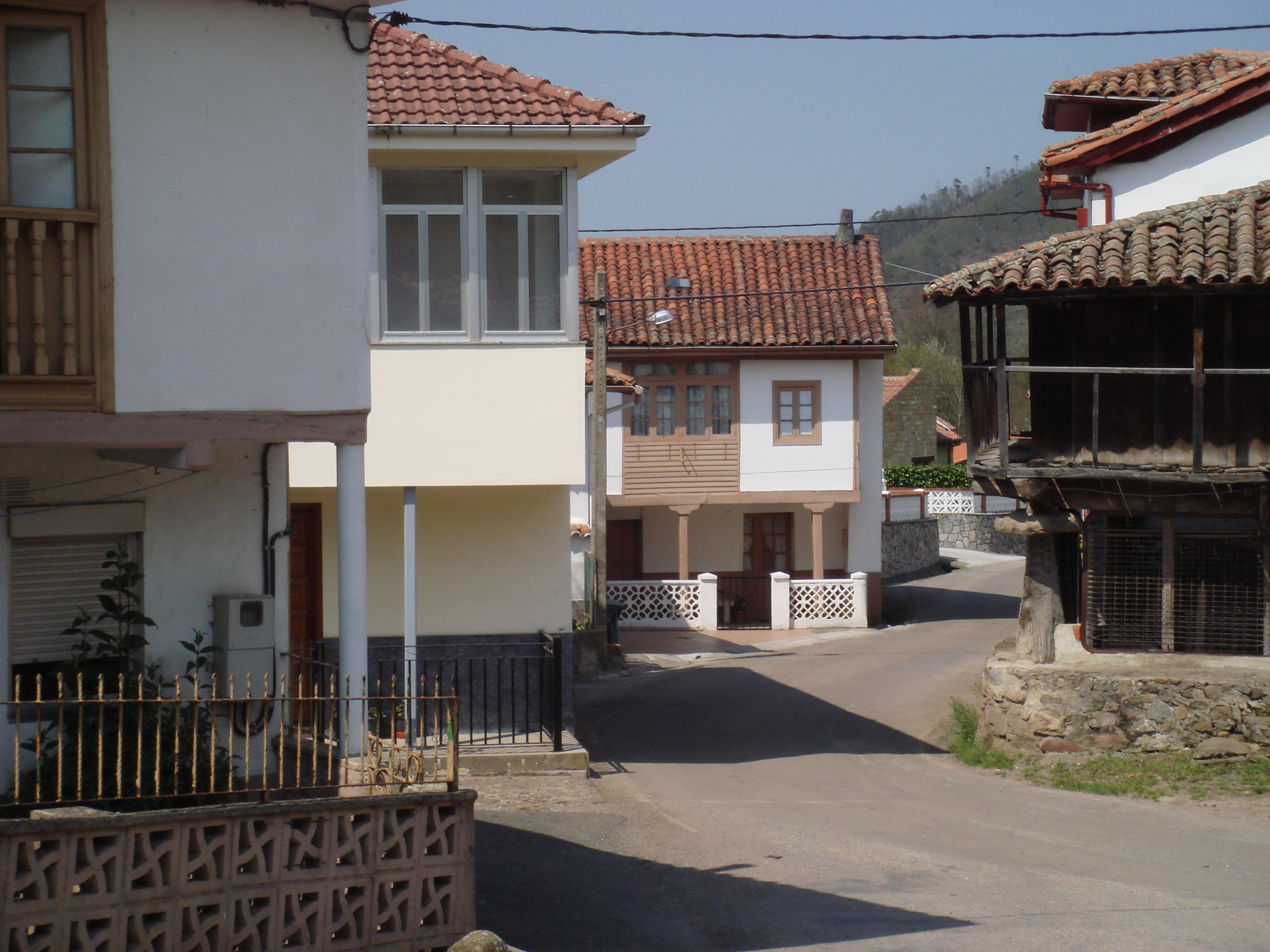
A street in Grado

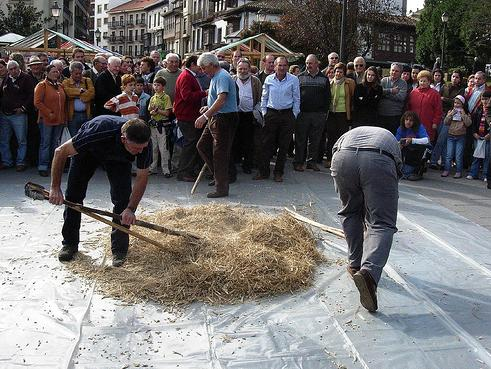
La Escanda

== See also ==
- Capilla de los Dolores (Grado)
- List of municipalities in Asturias
