= St. Martin's Church, Ahetze =

Church in Pyrénées-Atlantiques, France

St. Martin's Church, Ahetze French: église Saint-Martin d'Ahetze Occitan: Glèisa de Sant Martin, Ahètsa Basque: San Martin eliza (Ahetze)
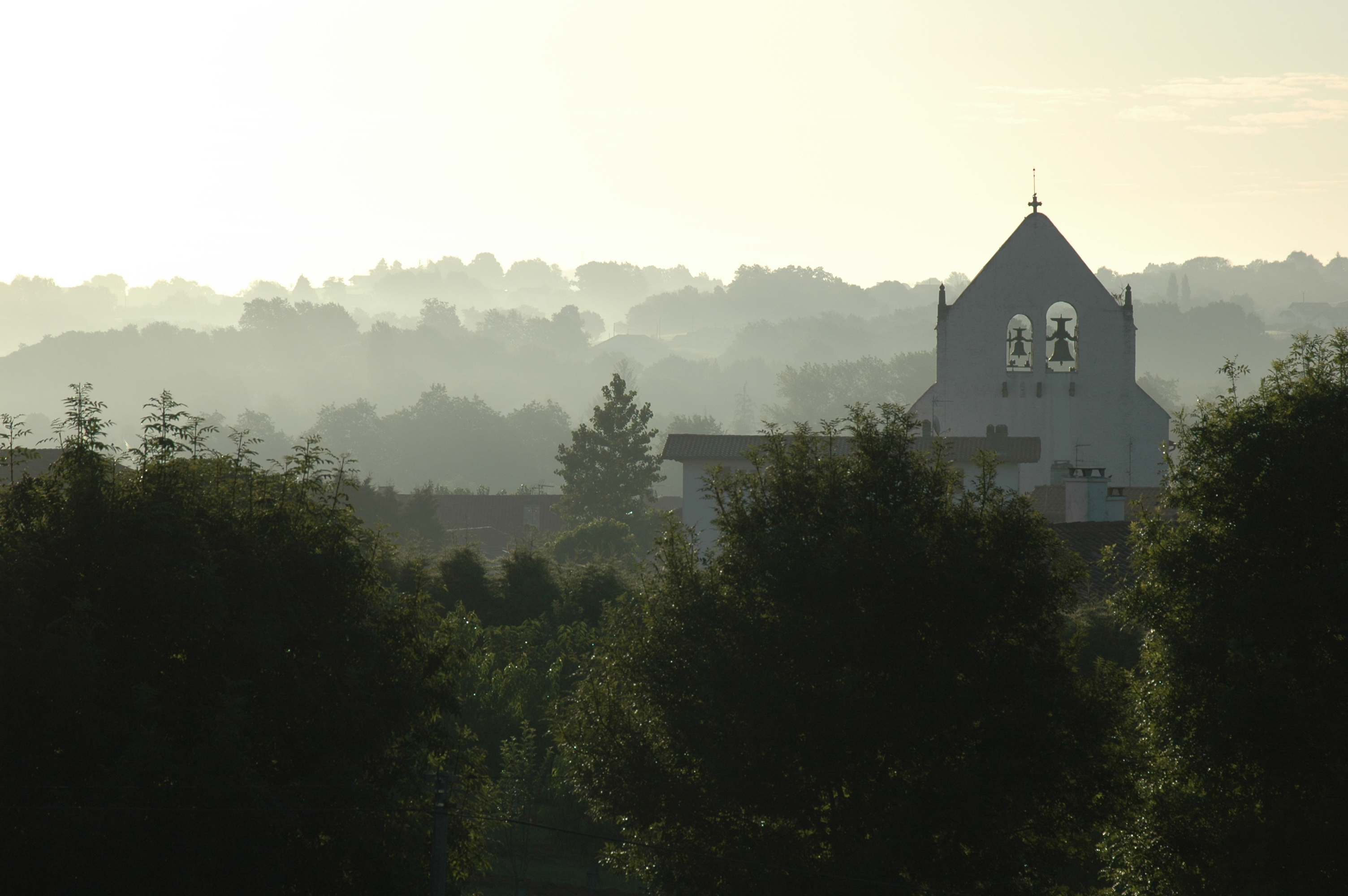

Religion
- Affiliation: Roman Catholic Church
- Province: Diocese of Bayonne, Lescar and Oloron
- Rite: Roman
- Ecclesiastical or organisational status: Parish church
- Status: Active

Location
- Location: Ahetze, Pyrénées-Atlantiques, France
- Interactive map of St. Martin's Church, Ahetze; French: église Saint-Martin d'Ahetze; Occitan: Glèisa de Sant Martin, Ahètsa; Basque: San Martin eliza (Ahetze)
- Coordinates: 43°24′21″N 1°34′17″W

Architecture
- Type: church
- Groundbreaking: 16th century

St. Martin's Church is a Roman Catholic parish church in Ahetze, Pyrénées-Atlantiques, France. It is dedicated to Saint Martin of Tours. It was registered as an official Historical Monument on June 5, 1973.

== Description ==
St. Martin Church is located at a crossing point of the Way of St. James. Its construction started in the 16th century. It contains an 18th-century wooden statue of St. James in pilgrim clothing, an 18th-century statue of the Assumption of Mary, an 18th-century altarpiece and a 15th-century processional cross. The arms of this cross are garnished with small bells. During a witch trial in 1609, this cross was considered as a diabolical object by Councillor Pierre de Lancre.

The cemetery of the church features a disc-shaped stele. Another stele from Ahetze is exhibited at the Basque Museum, Bayonne.

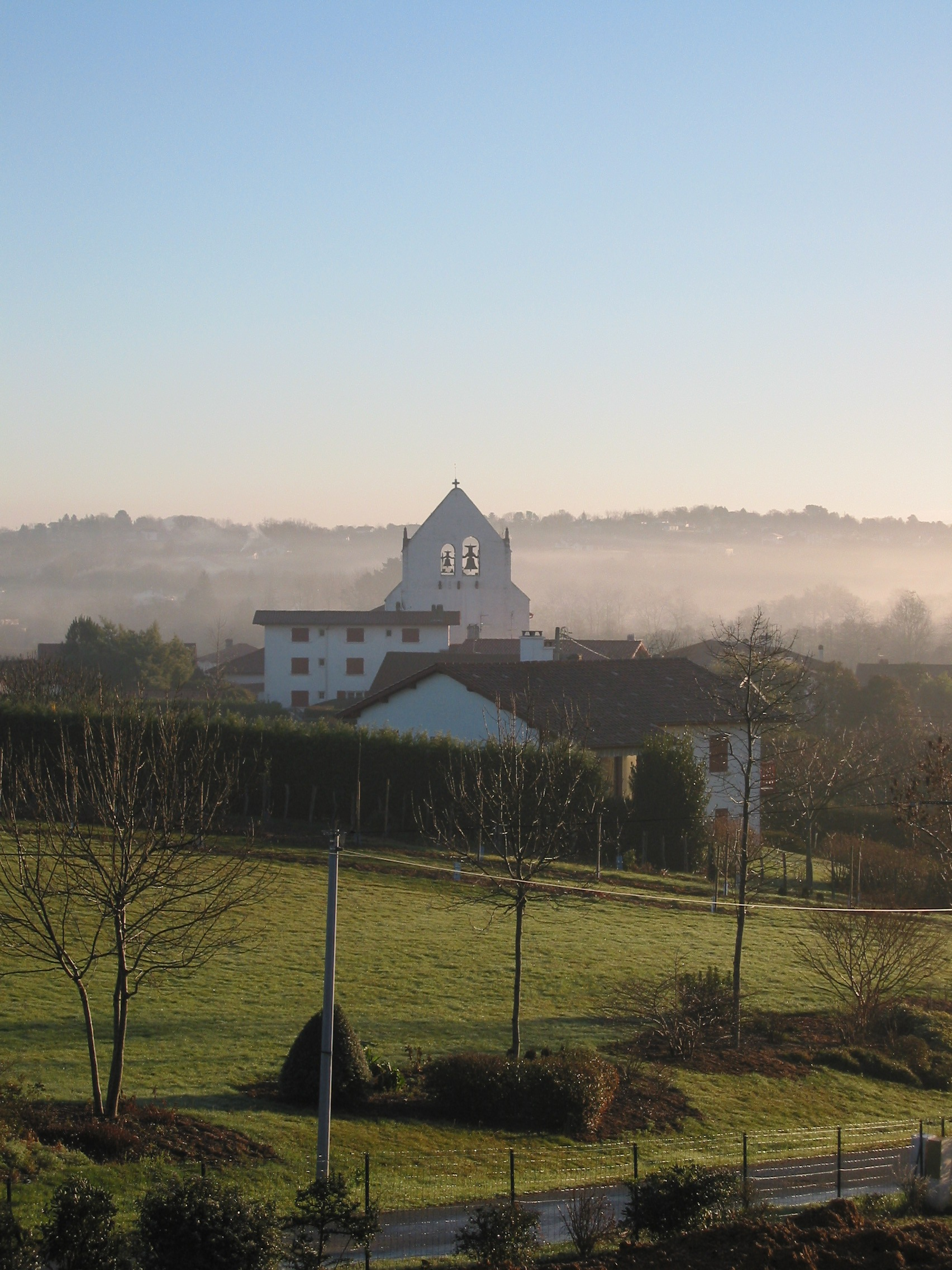
The church

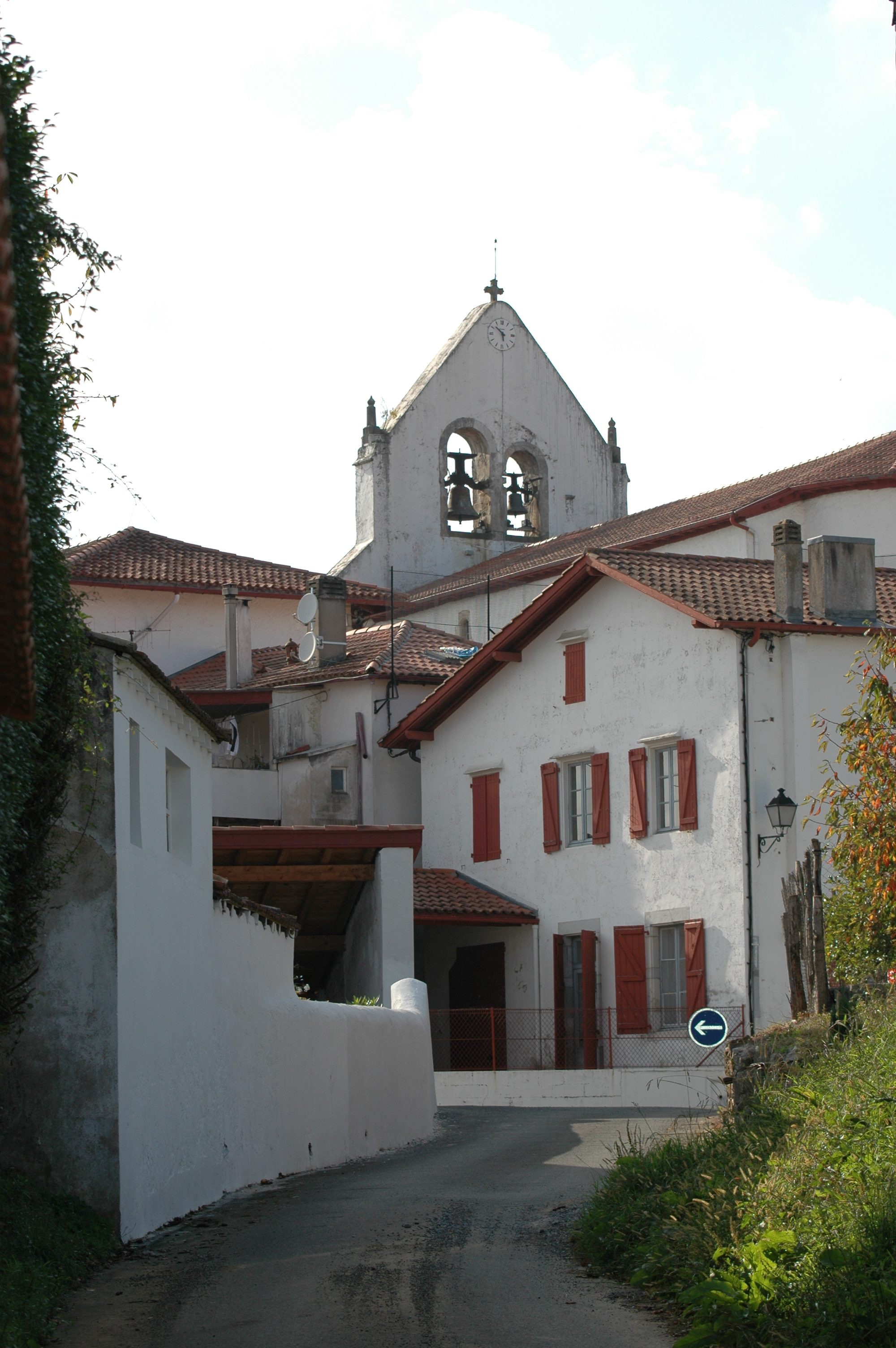
The bell tower seen from the village

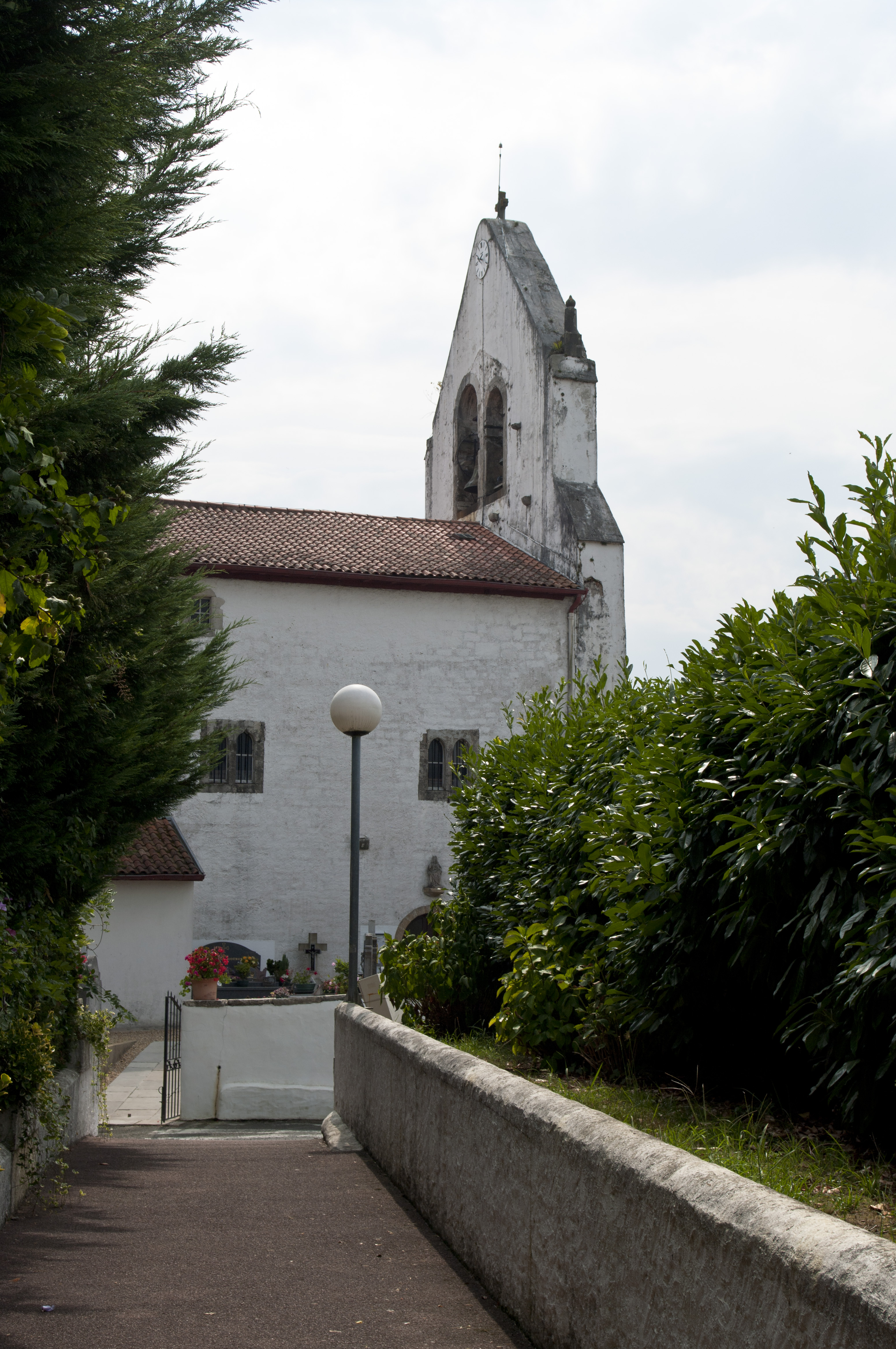
The bell tower

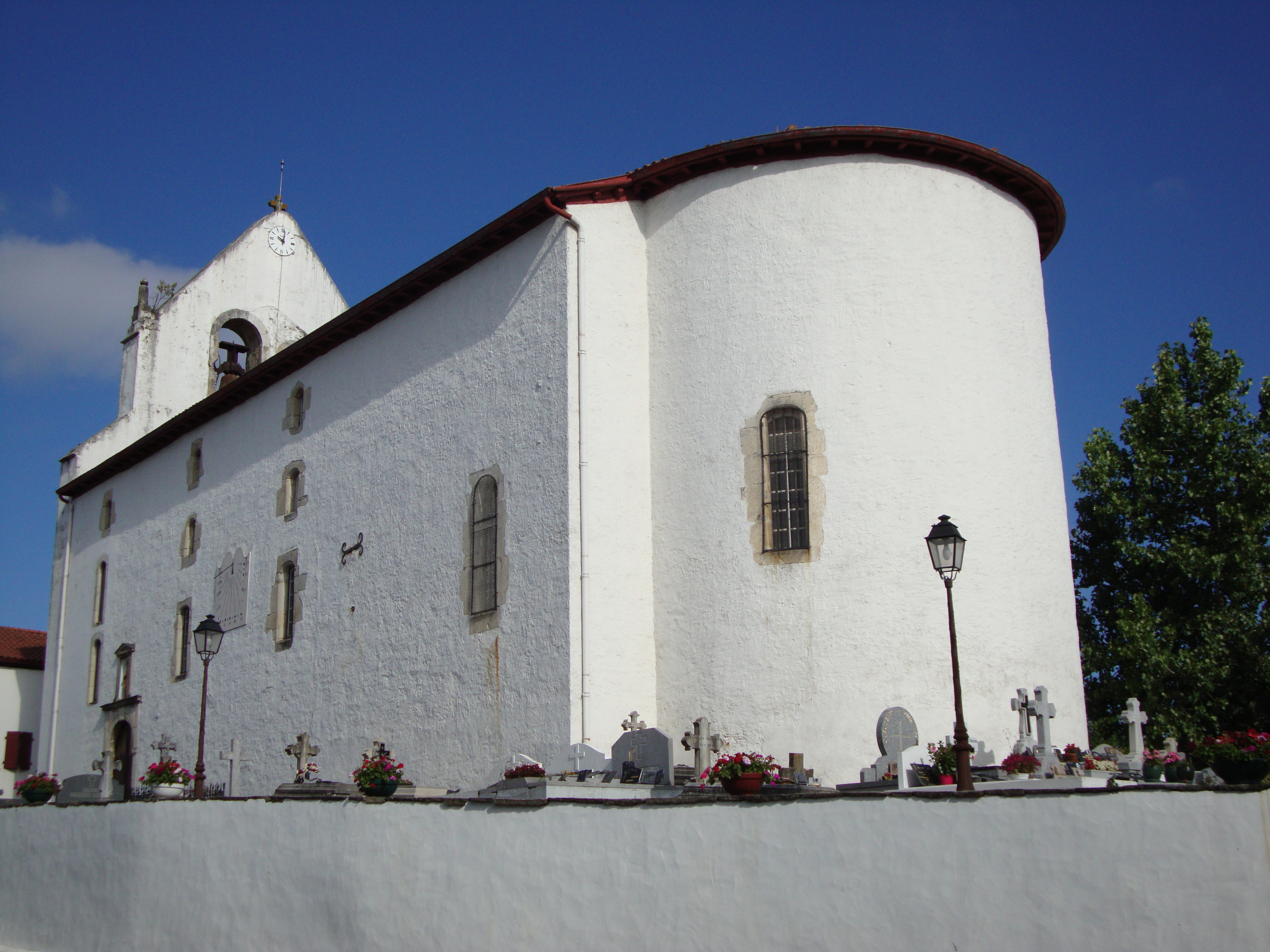
The apse

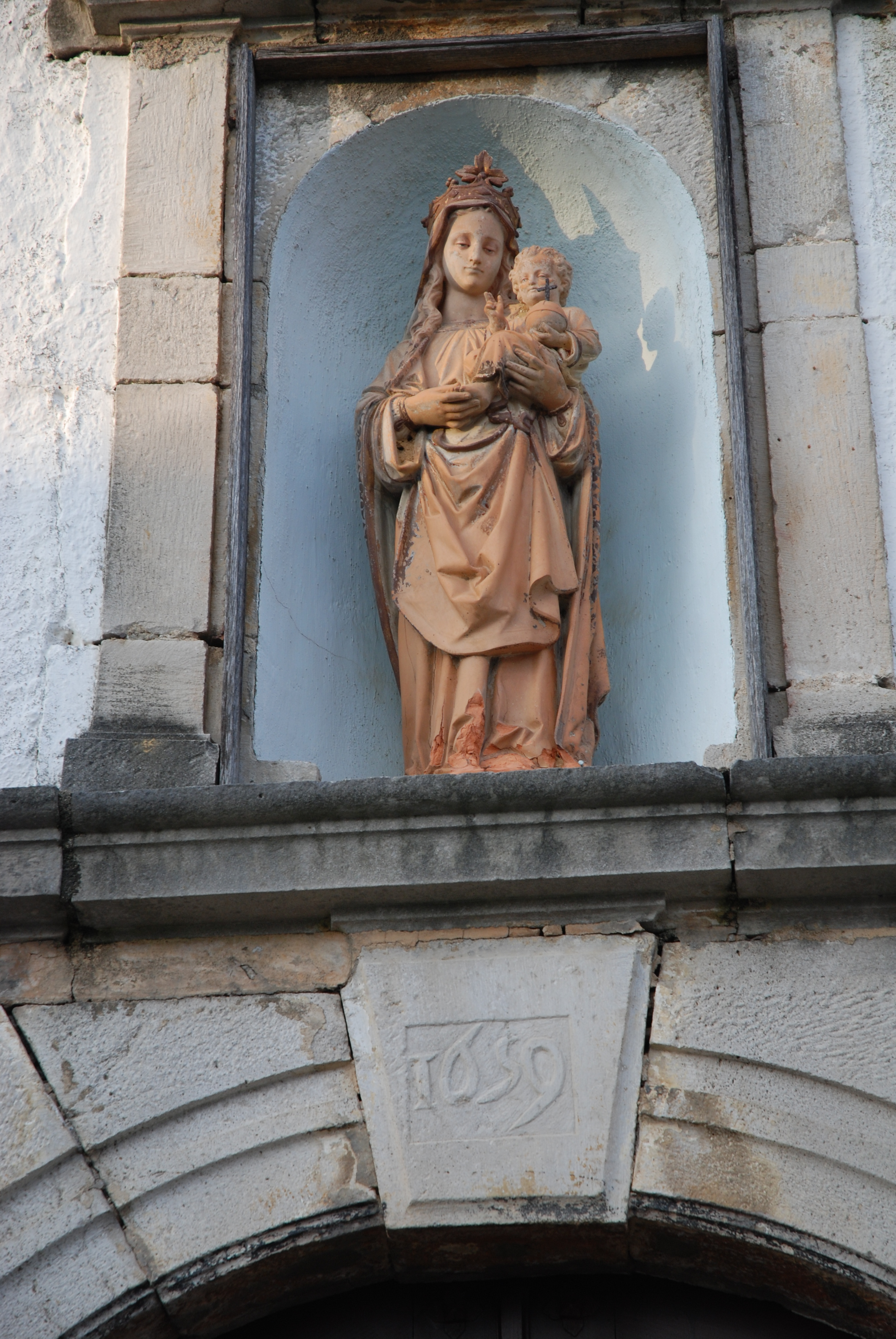
The entrance of the church

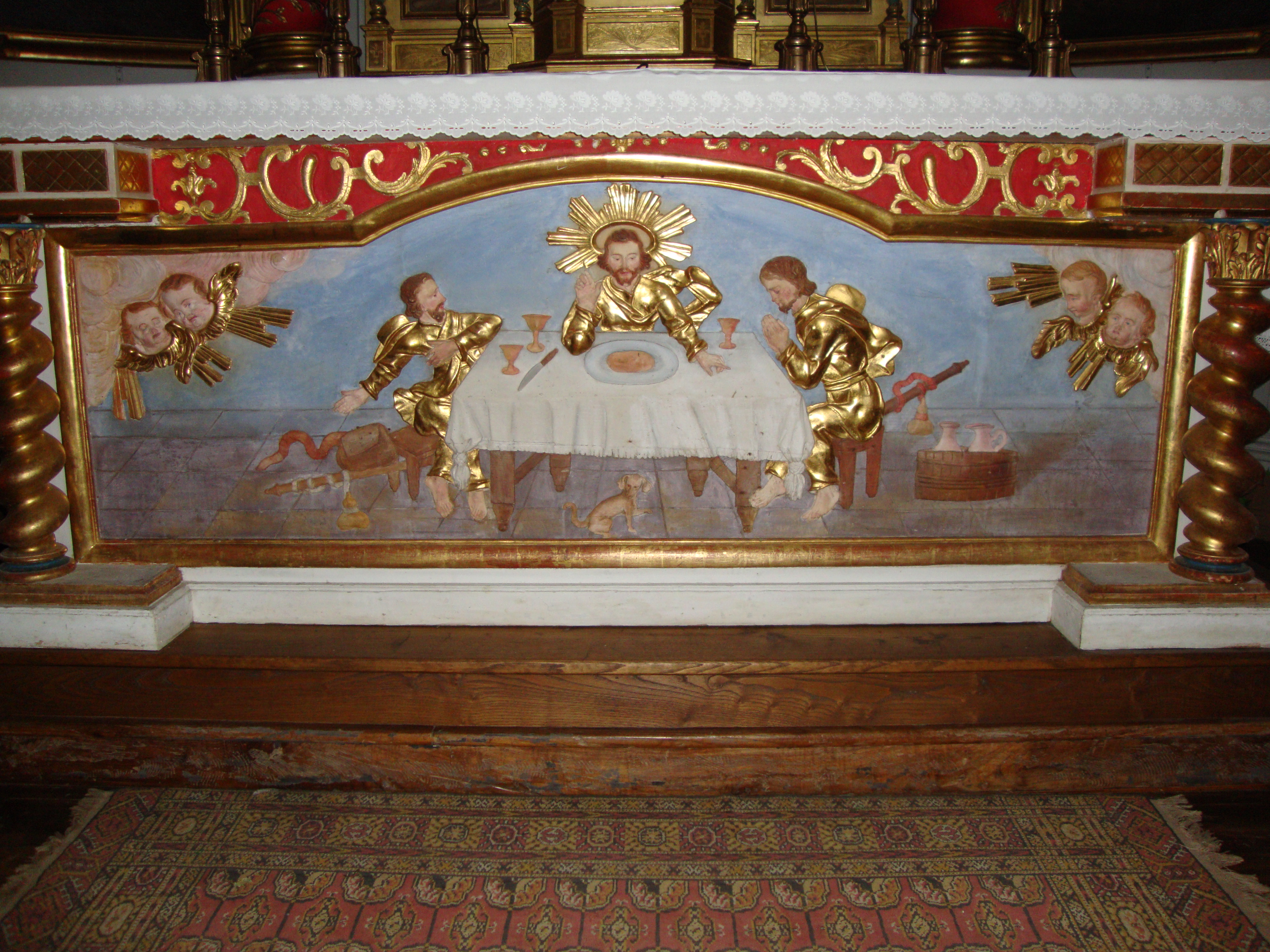
The altar with Jesus Christ and two pilgrims

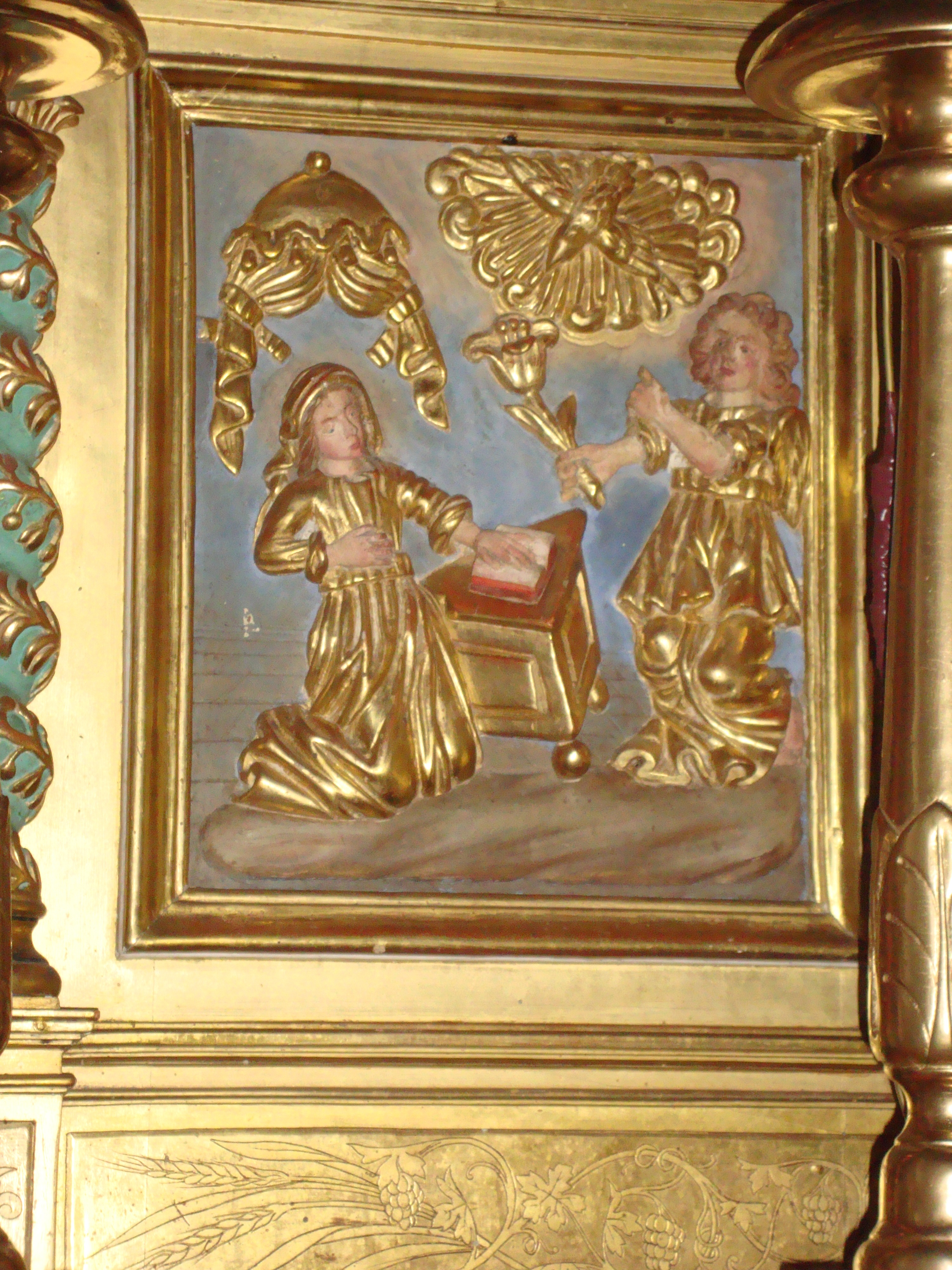
Detail of the altarpiece: the Annunciation

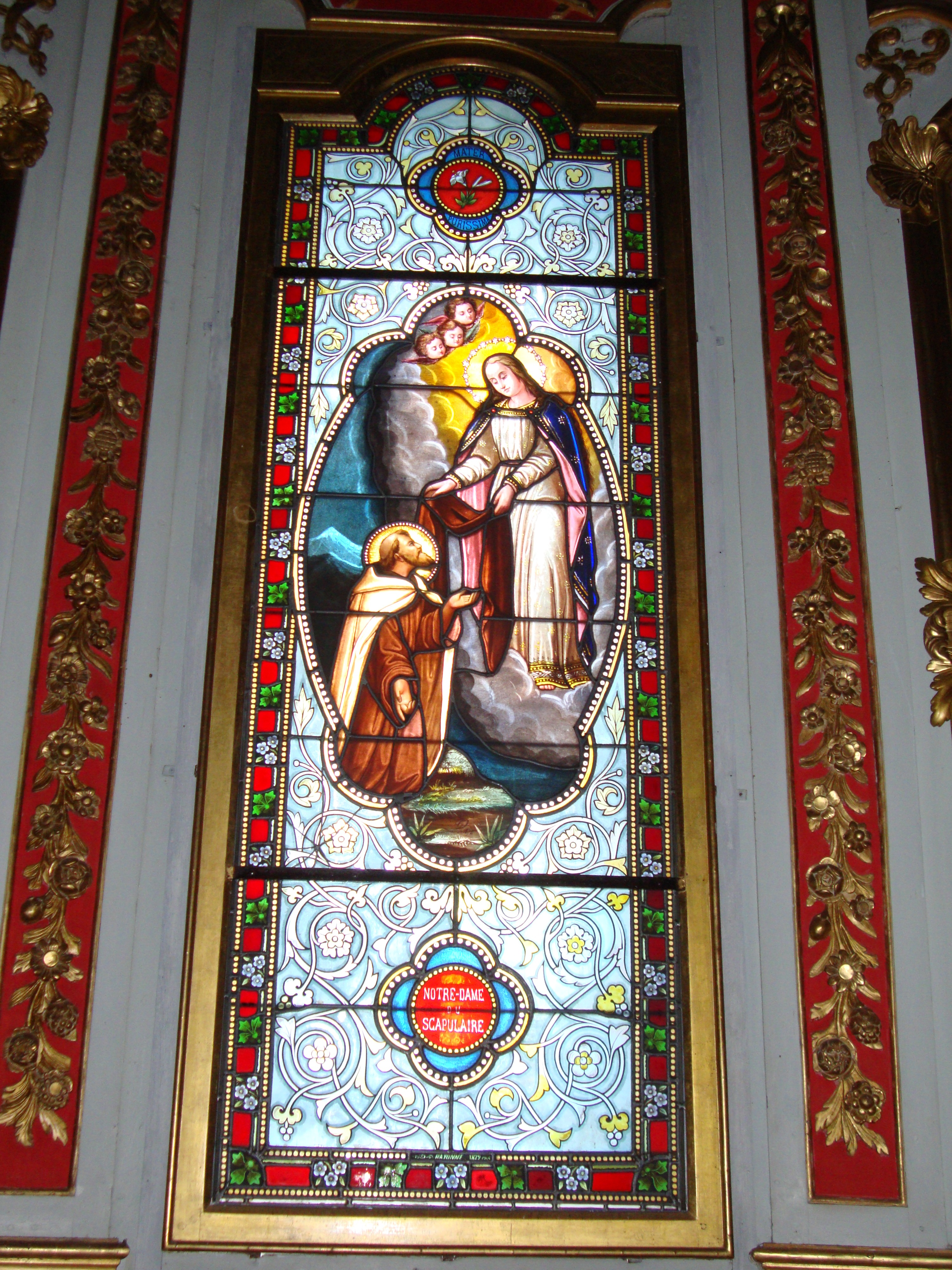
The Notre-Dame du Scapulaire, Mater purissima stained-glass window

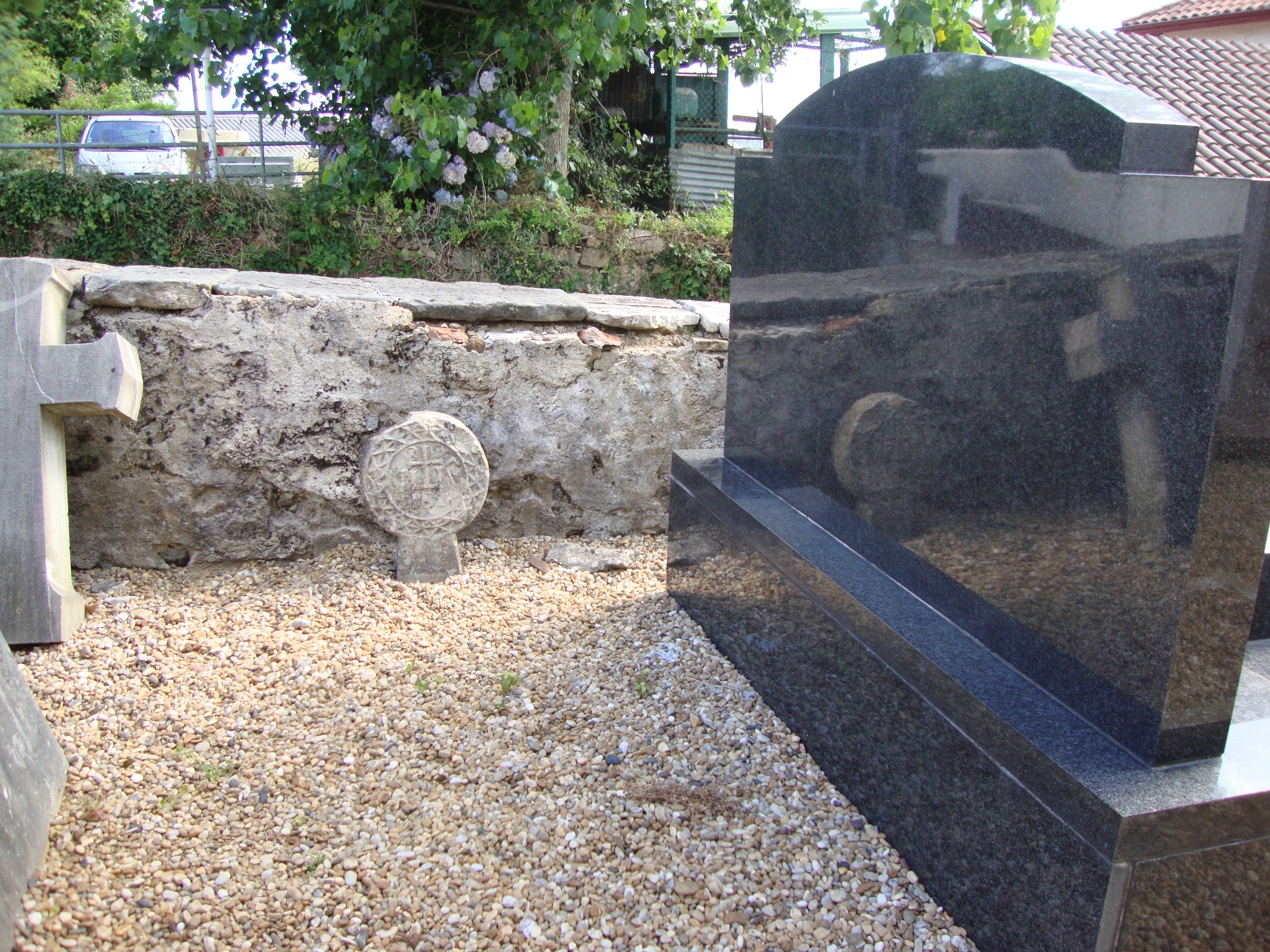
A disc-shaped stele

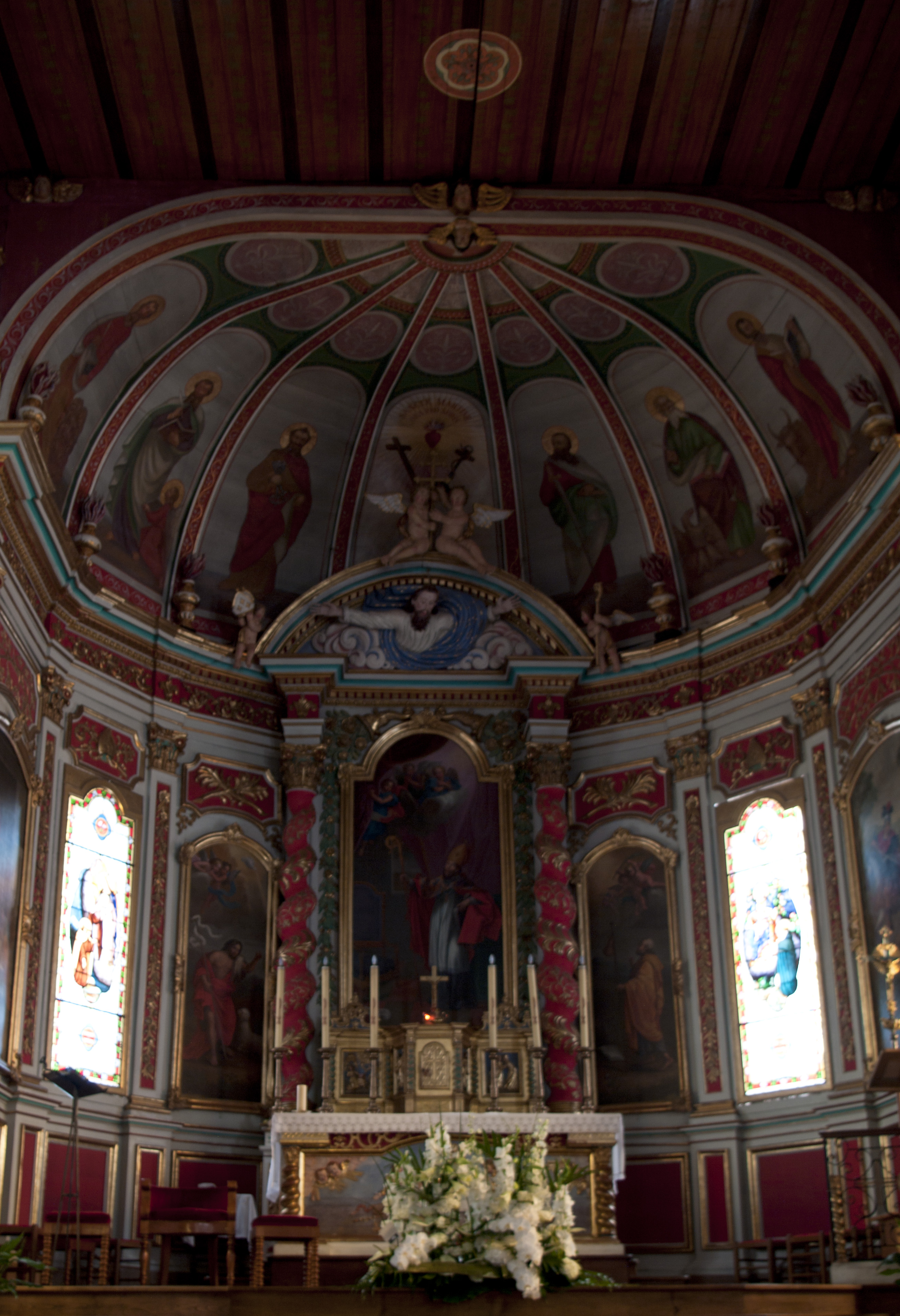
The choir of the church
