= Ahetze =

- Commune
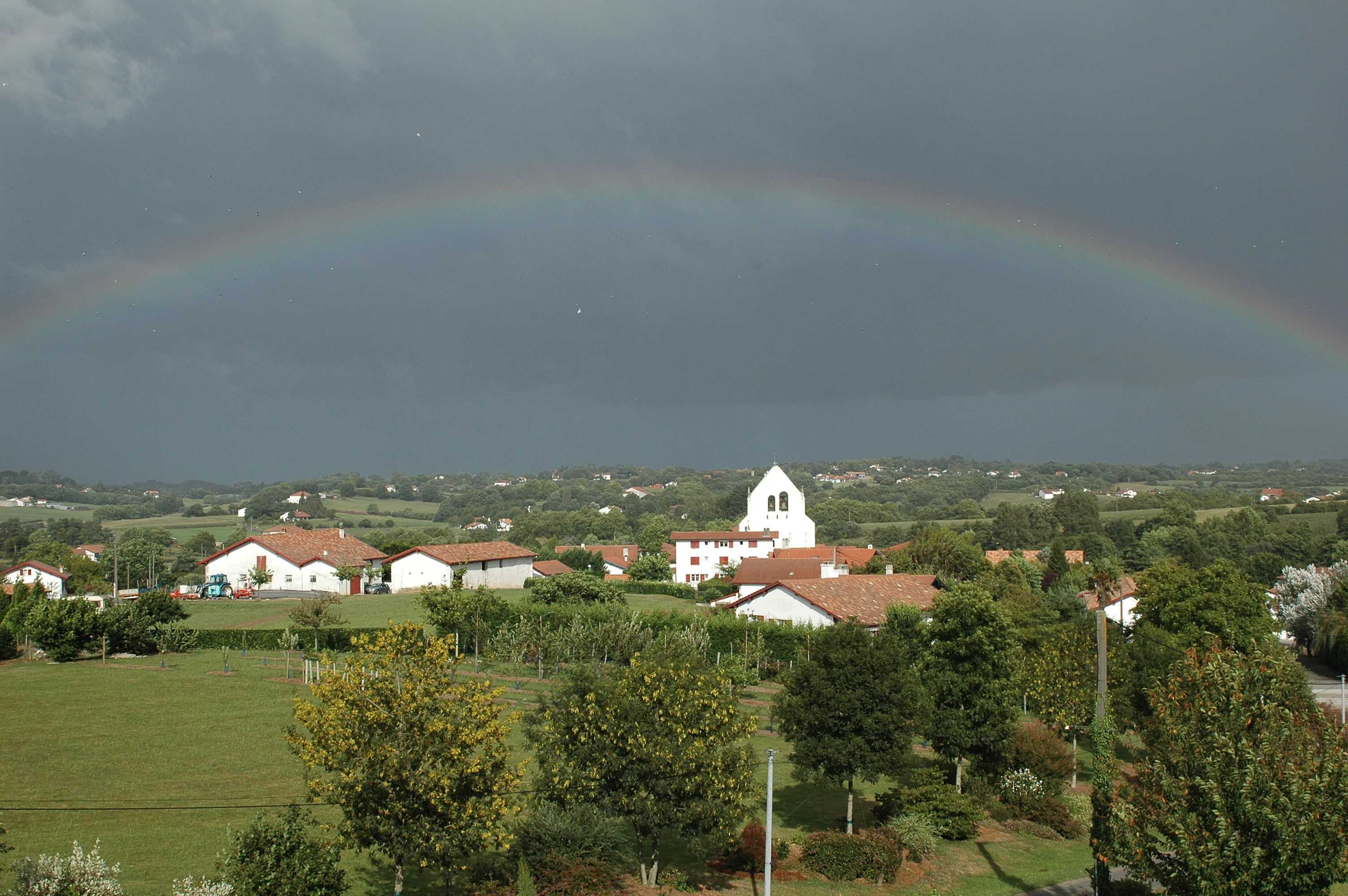
- A rainbow above the village

- Coat of arms
- Location of Ahetze
- Location within France Location within Nouvelle-Aquitaine
- Coordinates: 43°24′24″N 1°34′12″W
- Country: France
- Region: Nouvelle-Aquitaine
- Department: Pyrénées-Atlantiques
- Arrondissement: Bayonne
- Canton: Ustaritz-Vallées de Nive et Nivelle
- Intercommunality: Pays Basque

Government
  - Mayor (2025–2026): Ramuntxo Labat-Aramendy
- Area^{1}: 11 km^{2} (4.2 sq mi)
- Elevation: 25 m (82 ft)
- Highest elevation: 100 m (330 ft)
- Lowest elevation: 7 m (23 ft)
- Population (2023): 2,104
  - Density: 190/km^{2} (500/sq mi)
- Time zone: UTC+01:00 (CET)
  - Summer (DST): UTC+02:00 (CEST)
- INSEE/Postal code: 64009 /64210
- ^{1} French Land Register data, which excludes lakes, ponds, glaciers > 1 km^{2} (0.386 sq mi or 247 acres) and river estuaries.

Ahetze (French pronunciation: [a.ɛts]; Occitan: Ahètsa; Basque: Aratze) is a village and a commune in the Pyrénées-Atlantiques department in the Nouvelle-Aquitaine region in southwestern France. The commune is part of the urban area of Bayonne, and of the traditional Basque province of Labourd.

== Geography ==
=== Location ===
The commune is located some 13 km southwest of Bayonne and 30 km northeast of Donostia-San-Sebastion and only 4 km from the Atlantic beaches of Bidart and Guéthary.

=== Access ===
Ahetze village is at the intersection of departmental roads D655 from Arbonne to Bidart and D855 from Saint-Pée-sur-Nivelle to Saint-Jean-de-Luz. The commune can be accessed from Exit 4 (Biarritz La Négresse) and Exit 3 (Saint-Jean-de-Luz nord) from the A63 autoroute.

The Biarritz–Anglet–Bayonne Airport is 15-minute drive from the village.

=== Hydrography ===
The river Zirikolatzeko erreka, a tributary of the Uhabia, flows through the commune, as well as several of its tributaries, including the Amisolako, Uroneko, and Besaingo.

Paul Raymond also stated in his Topographical dictionary of Bearn-Basque Country in 1863 that a tributary of the Alborga: the Haïstéchéhé flows through Ahetze after rising in Saint-Pée-sur-Nivelle.

=== Localities and hamlets ===
- Adamenea
- Aguerria
- Amizola
- Arrakotenea
- Belhardiko Errota
- Biperenborda
- Borda
- Dorrea
- Etxebiaga
- Haroztegia
- Harrieta
- Ithurbidea
- Ithurbidenborda
- Laharraga
- Larramendia
- Larreluzea
- Larretxeberria
- Larrunta or Larruntaldea
- Martikotenea
- Mulienea
- Olhagaina
- Ostaleriaborda
- Solorzano
- Uhartea
- Xaharrenea
- Ximikoenea
- Xirrikenea

== Toponymy ==
The commune name in Basque is also Ahetze.

Jean-Baptiste Orpustan suggested that Ahetze comes from aiz meaning "stone" and by extension "high rock" (see also: Ahaitz).

The following table details the origins of the commune name and other names in the commune.

| Name | Spelling | Date | Source | Page | Origin | Description |
|---|---|---|---|---|---|---|
| Ahetze | Ahece | 1083 | Orpustan | | | Village |
| | Ahese | 1170 | Orpustan | | | |
| | Aheze | 1170 | Orpustan | | | |
| | de Hetsa | 1249 | Orpustan | | | |
| | Villa quœ dicitur Ahece | 12th century | Raymond | 3 | Bayonne | |
| | Aheze | 13th century | Raymond | 3 | Bayonne | |
| | Ahetce | 1302 | Raymond | 3 | Chapter | |
| | Ahetze | 19th century | Lhande | | | |
| Amisolako erreka | Amisola | 1863 | Raymond | 5 | | Stream |
| Larrustaldéa | Larungoriz | 13th century | Raymond | 95 | Bayonne | Village |
| Ouhas-Aldéa | Ouhas-Aldéa | 1863 | Raymond | 129 | | Hamlet |

Sources:

- Orpustan: Jean-Baptiste Orpustan, New Basque Toponymy
- Raymond: Topographic Dictionary of the Department of Basses-Pyrenees, 1863, on the page numbers indicated in the table. (in French)
- Lhande: Pierre Lhande, Basque-French Dictionary 1926

Origins:

- Bayonne: Cartulary of Bayonne or Livre d'Or (Book of Gold)
- Chapter: Titles of the Chapter of Bayonne

According to Eugène Goyheneche: "two houses (…) had medieval names of Akarreta and Haranbillaga".

== History ==
In the Middle Ages the Compostela pilgrims who chose the passage along the Atlantic coast passed near Ahetze, Ibarron and the hospital (Ospitale Zaharra) in Sare. Others preferred to fork through part of Ahetze to reach the chapel Saint-Jacques of Serres and also visit Vera by passing by Olhette and the Ibardin Pass.

=== Heraldry ===
| Arms of Ahetze | Blazon: Party per pale, one of Or a lion rampant of gules supporting a processional cross with six small bells all sable; two azure a pilgrim's stick of Or surmounted by two escallops the same.. |

== Administration ==
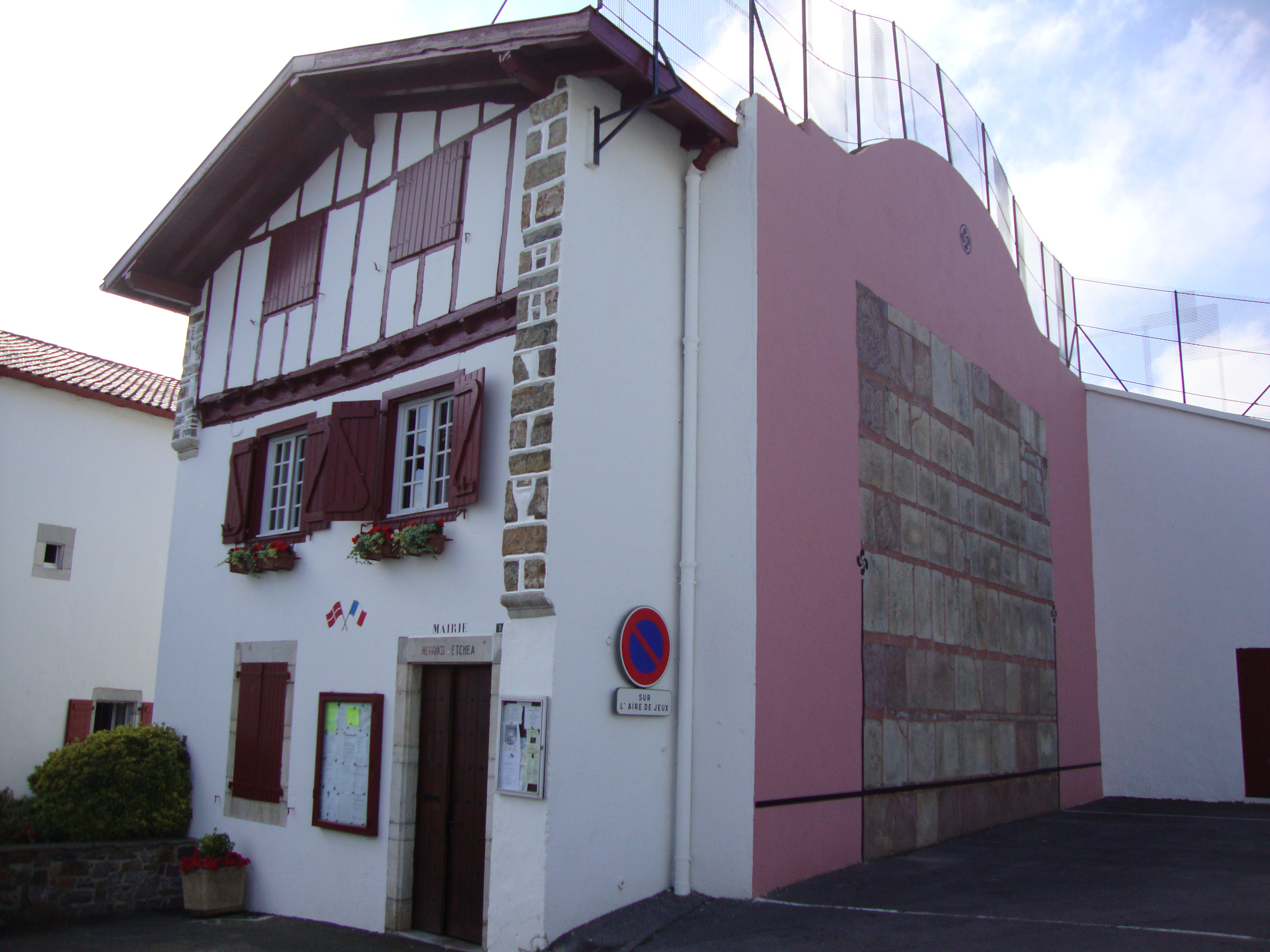
The Town Hall and the fronton

List of Successive Mayors of Ahetze

| From | To | Name | Party | Position |
|---|---|---|---|---|
| 1957 | 1971 | Élie Charles Philippe Marie d'Elbée | | |
| 1995 | 2008 | Pierre Cocagne | | |
| 2008 | 2011 | Jean d'Elbée | | Oceanographer & Biologist |
| 2011 | 2025 | Philippe Élissalde | DVD | School Teacher, Director |
| 2025 | 2026 | Ramuntxo Labat-Aramendy | | |

=== Inter-Communality ===
Ahetze is a member of 8 Intercommunal organisations:

- the Communauté d'agglomération du Pays Basque
- the union of Ouhabia
- the intercommunal association of secondary schools of Saint-Jean-de-Luz
- the intercommunal association Nive-Nivelle
- the mixed association of Bizi Garbia
- the association to support Basque culture
- the joint association for drinking water from the Ura
- the joint sanitation association of the Ura

The commune is a member of the Basque Eurocity Bayonne - San Sebastian.

== Population ==
The inhabitants of the commune are known as Aheztars in French.

Historical population

| Year | Pop. | ±% p.a. |
|---|---|---|
| 1793 | 415 | — |
| 1800 | 418 | +0.10% |
| 1806 | 433 | +0.59% |
| 1821 | 511 | +1.11% |
| 1831 | 524 | +0.25% |
| 1836 | 608 | +3.02% |
| 1841 | 579 | −0.97% |
| 1846 | 577 | −0.07% |
| 1851 | 644 | +2.22% |
| 1856 | 620 | −0.76% |
| 1861 | 605 | −0.49% |
| 1866 | 595 | −0.33% |
| 1872 | 567 | −0.80% |
| 1876 | 553 | −0.62% |
| 1881 | 543 | −0.36% |
| 1886 | 540 | −0.11% |
| 1891 | 529 | −0.41% |
| 1896 | 533 | +0.15% |
| 1901 | 550 | +0.63% |

| Year | Pop. | ±% p.a. |
|---|---|---|
| 1906 | 523 | −1.00% |
| 1911 | 537 | +0.53% |
| 1921 | 485 | −1.01% |
| 1926 | 456 | −1.23% |
| 1931 | 507 | +2.14% |
| 1936 | 459 | −1.97% |
| 1946 | 428 | −0.70% |
| 1954 | 460 | +0.91% |
| 1962 | 479 | +0.51% |
| 1968 | 484 | +0.17% |
| 1975 | 567 | +2.29% |
| 1982 | 869 | +6.29% |
| 1990 | 1,069 | +2.62% |
| 1999 | 1,318 | +2.35% |
| 2007 | 1,473 | +1.40% |
| 2012 | 1,899 | +5.21% |
| 2017 | 2,158 | +2.59% |
| 2023 | 2,104 | −0.42% |

Source: EHESS and INSEE

== Economy ==
The flea market takes place every third Sunday of the month and regularly attracts lovers of antiques from the Paris region, to the Spanish communes all around and contributes to the economic revitalization of the village which has mainly agricultural activity.

The commune is part of the Appellation d'origine contrôlée (AOC) zone of Ossau-iraty.

== Culture and heritage ==
=== Languages ===
The Map of the Seven Basque Provinces established by Prince Louis-Lucien Bonaparte in 1863 indicated that the Basque dialect spoken in Ahetze was Labourdin.

=== Festivals ===
Established in 1971, the Committee of Festivals of Ahetze (Ahetzeko Mozkor Banda) organises the following events: wheat threshing, dance evenings, a gala of Basque rural sports, loto, and employers' festivals that take place between 25 October and 11 November.

=== Civil heritage ===
- The Ostalapia farm, now a restaurant, is a former way station on the road to Saint Jacques de Compostela and long before was a haven for the Guethariars and Bidartars when they were attacked by pirates from the ocean or by robbers. There are some boulders once used for walls in the parking area.
- Some old Baserri dating from the 17th and 18th centuries, some of which have been extended over time. New construction follows the Labourdin style.
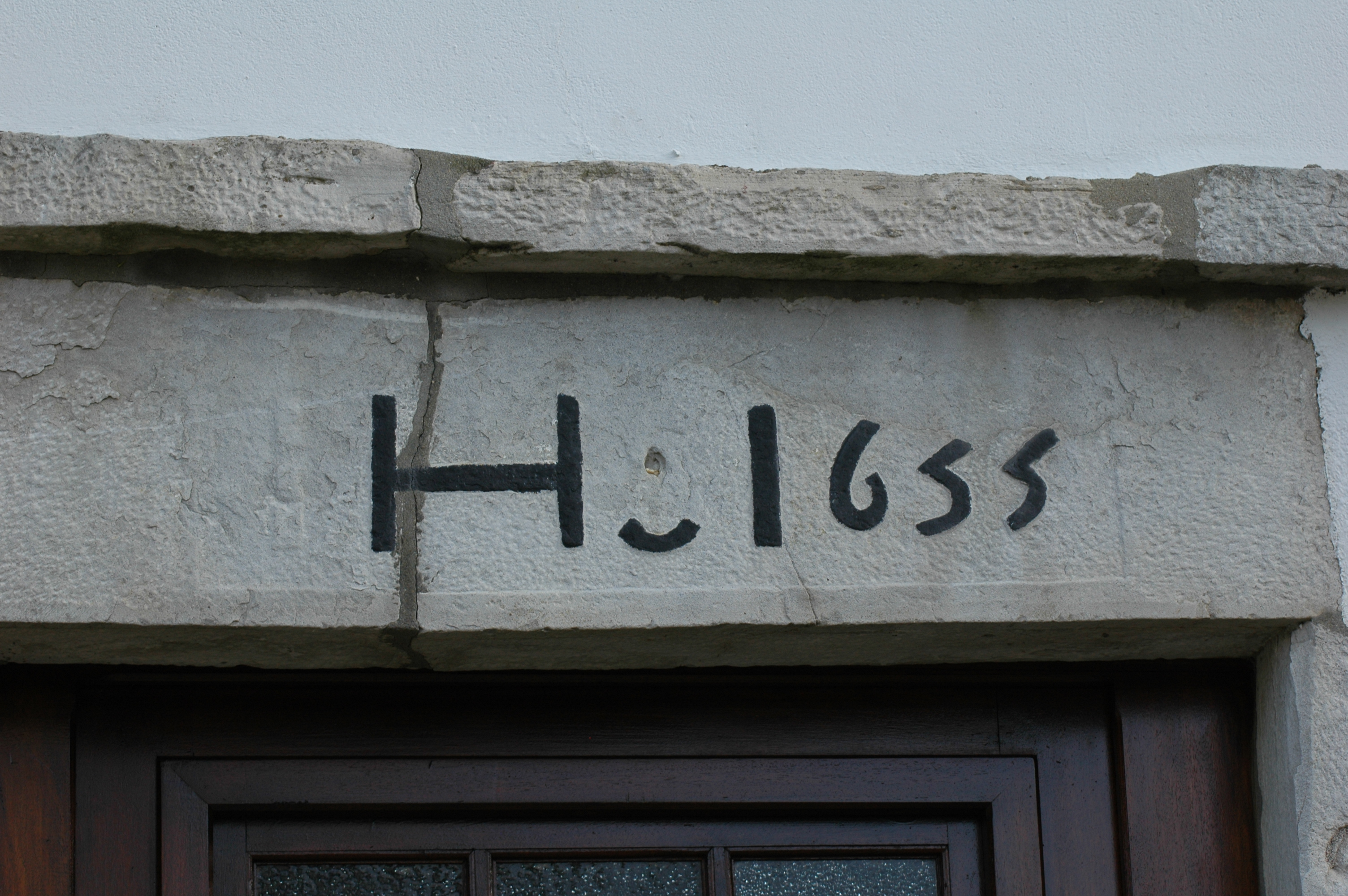
Lintel dating from 1655

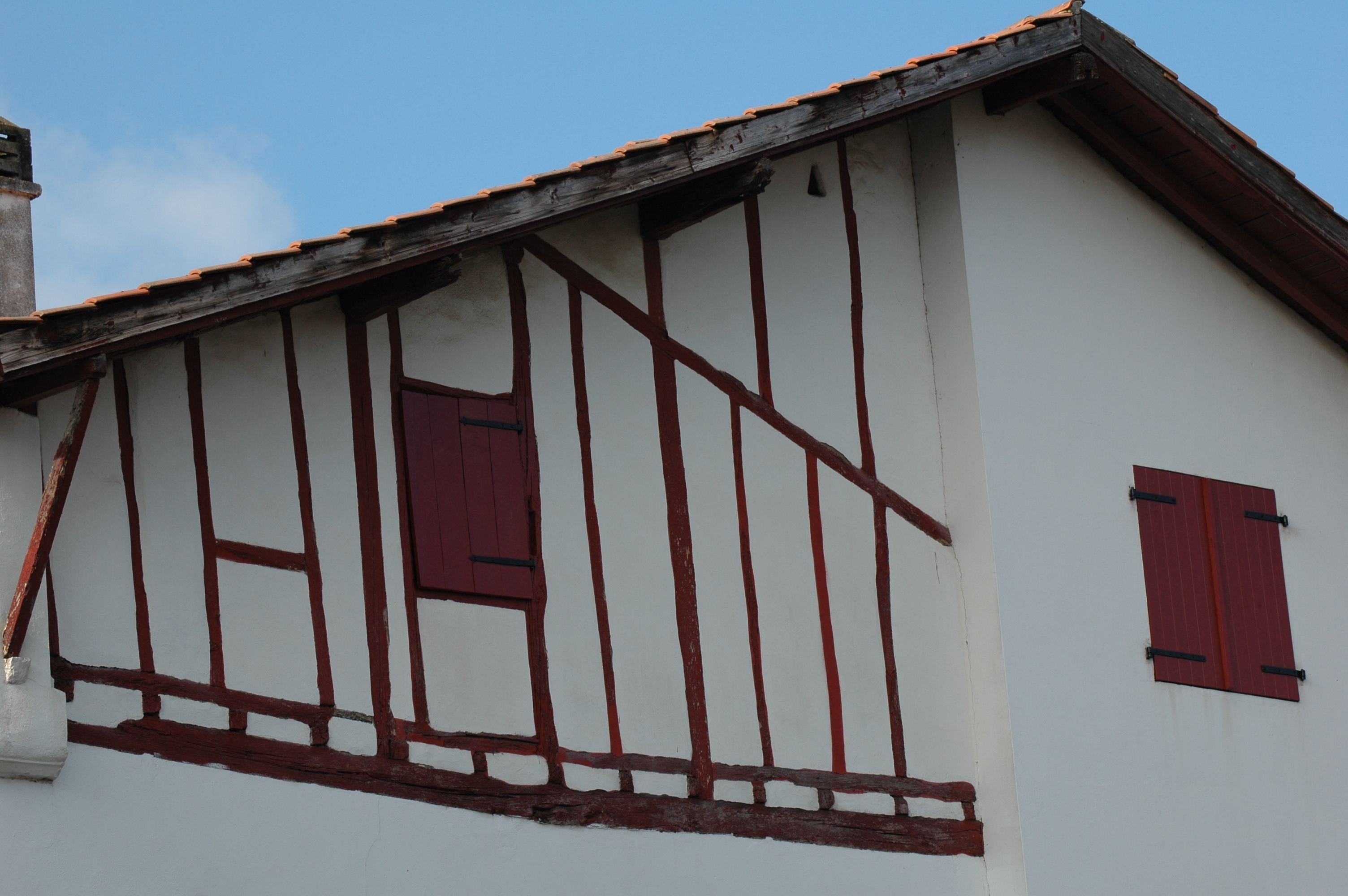
House extension

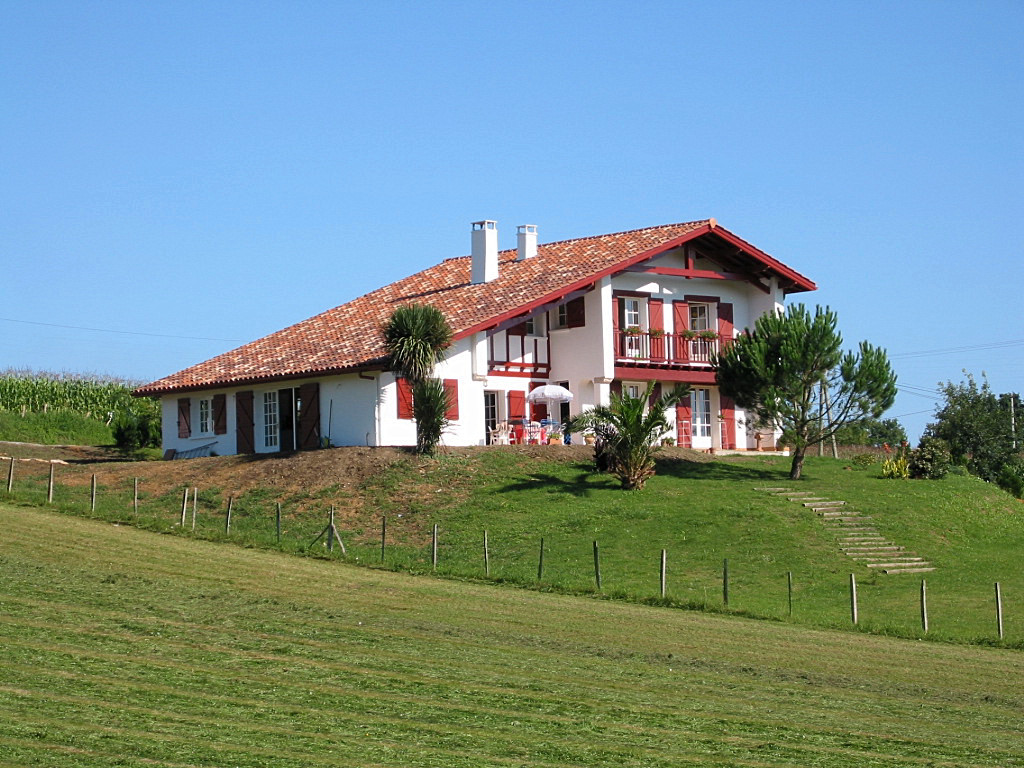
Modern Baserri (late 20th century)

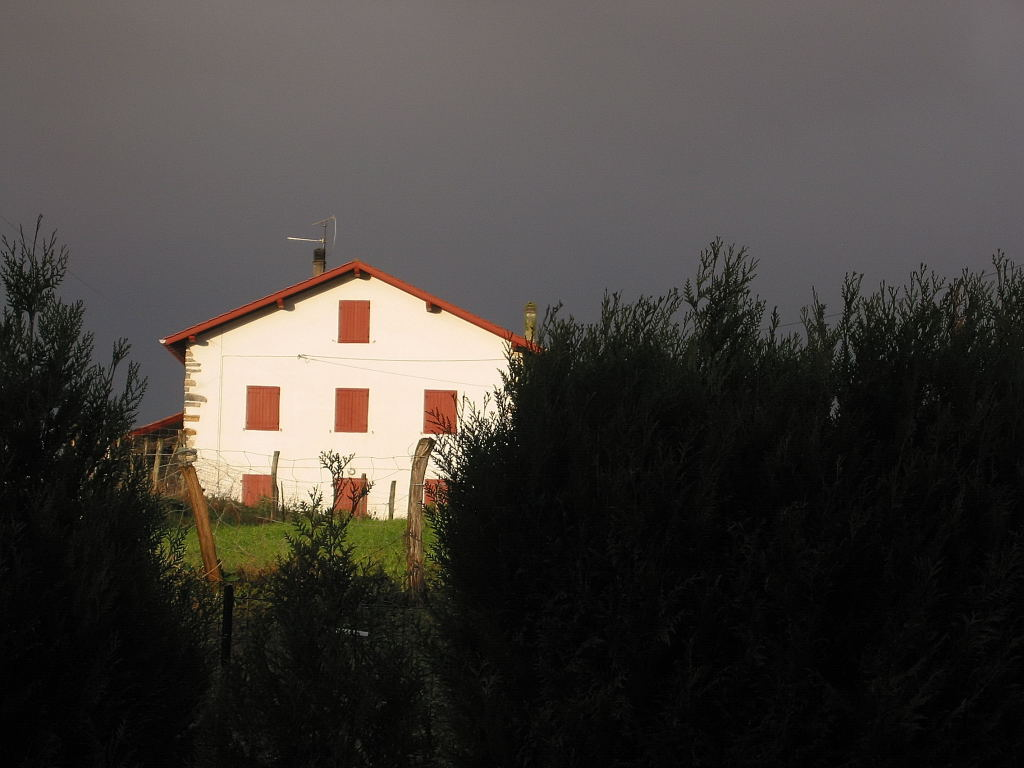
Basque House under a storm

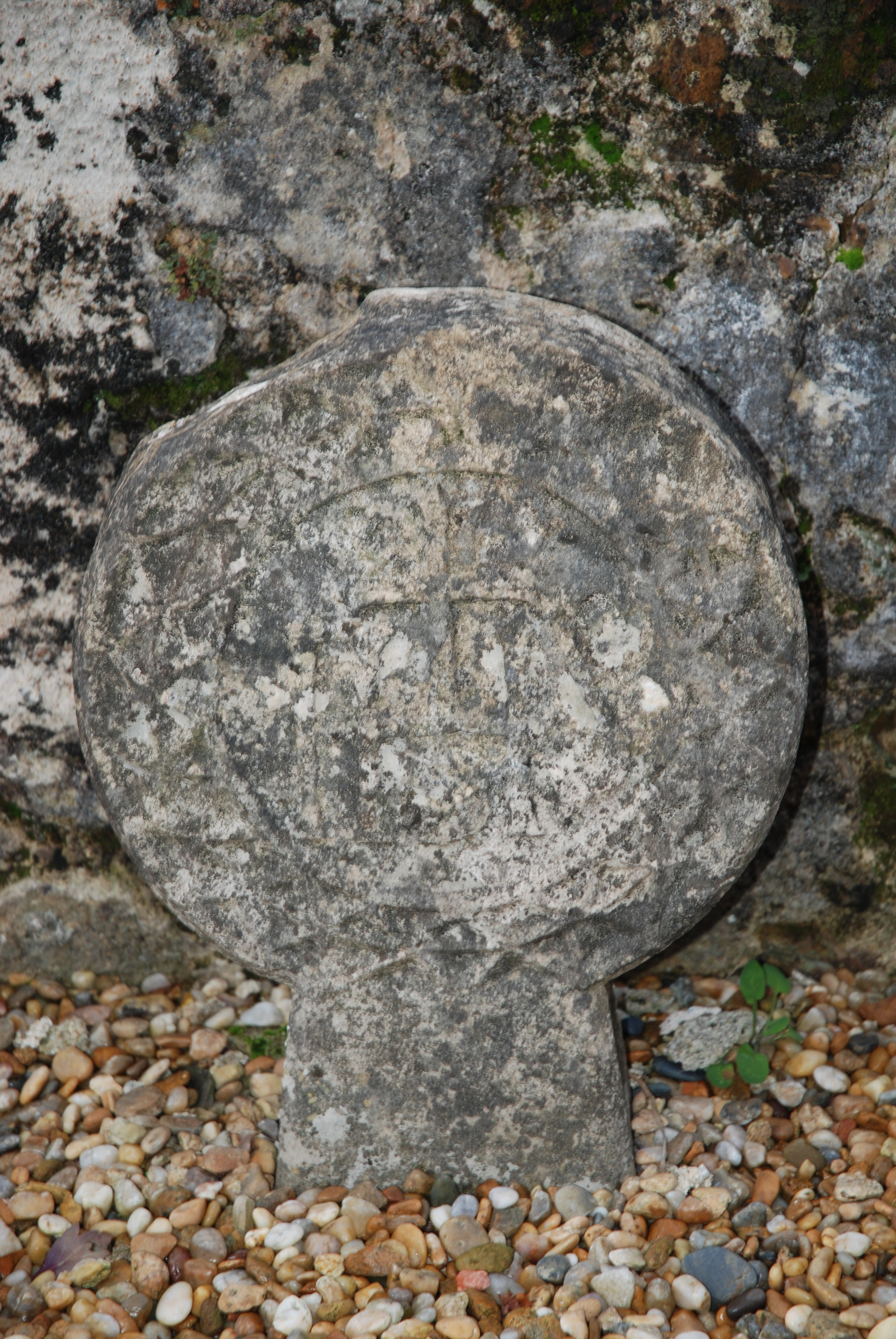
Hilarri

=== Religious heritage ===
The Church of Saint Martin (16th century) is registered as an historical monument. The church contains a number of items that are registered as historical objects:

  - A Retable and 7 Paintings (1700)
  - A Processional Cross (15th century). This cross, whose arms are garnished with bells, was used in witchcraft trials in the year 1609 to the outrage of Councilor Lancre who saw it as an evil object. The carvings on the Cross represent the faces of Christ, the Virgin, Saint John, a pelican, and two women's heads. On the back of the cross there is the representation of a bishop, undoubtedly Saint Martin.
  - A Statue: Virgin of the Assumption (18th century)
  - A Statue: Saint Jacques dressed as a pilgrim (18th century)

Eugène Goyheneche noted that the church quite exceptionally possessed a register of Catholics in Basque.

The Church Picture Gallery

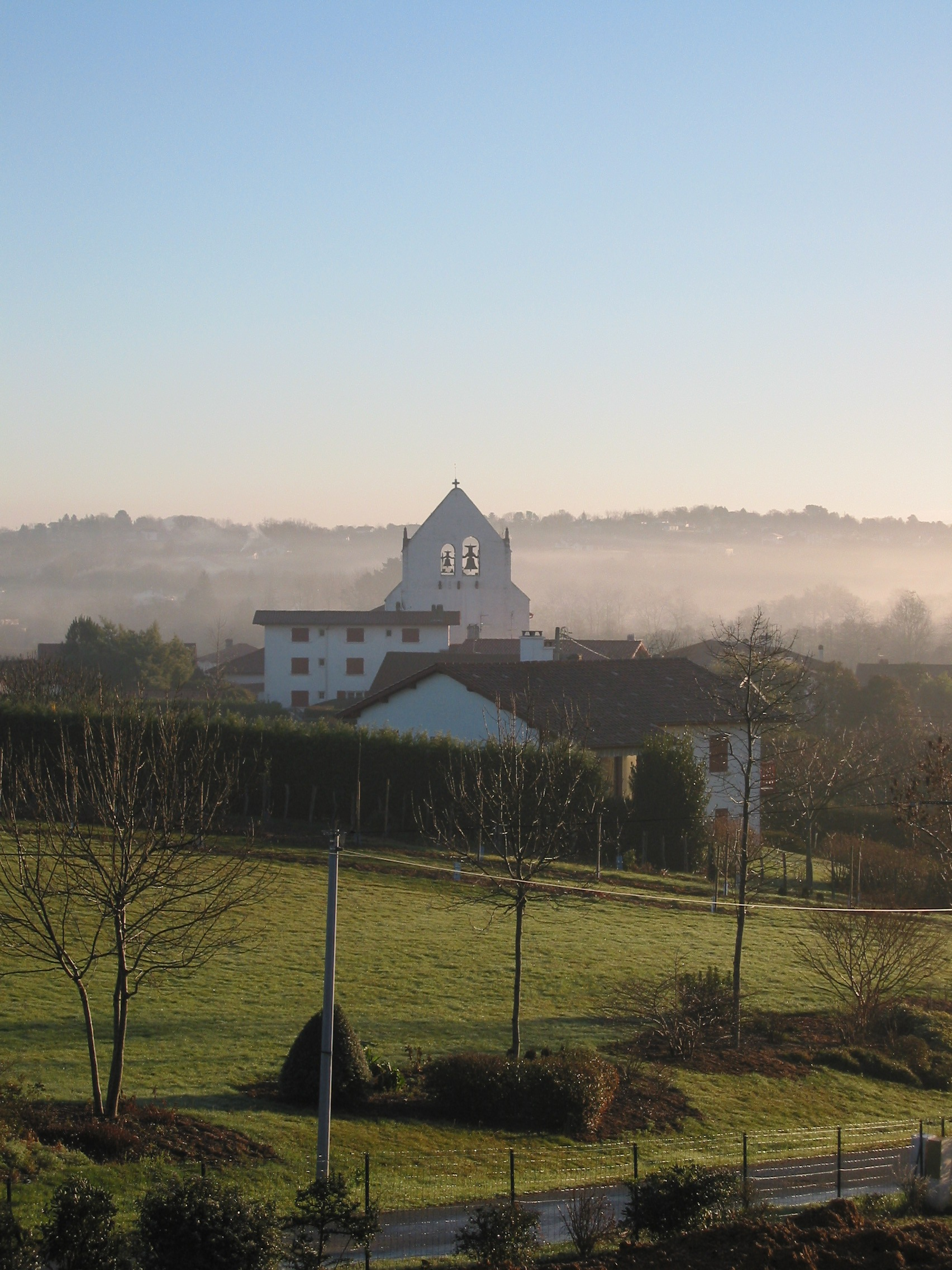
Church of Saint-Martin

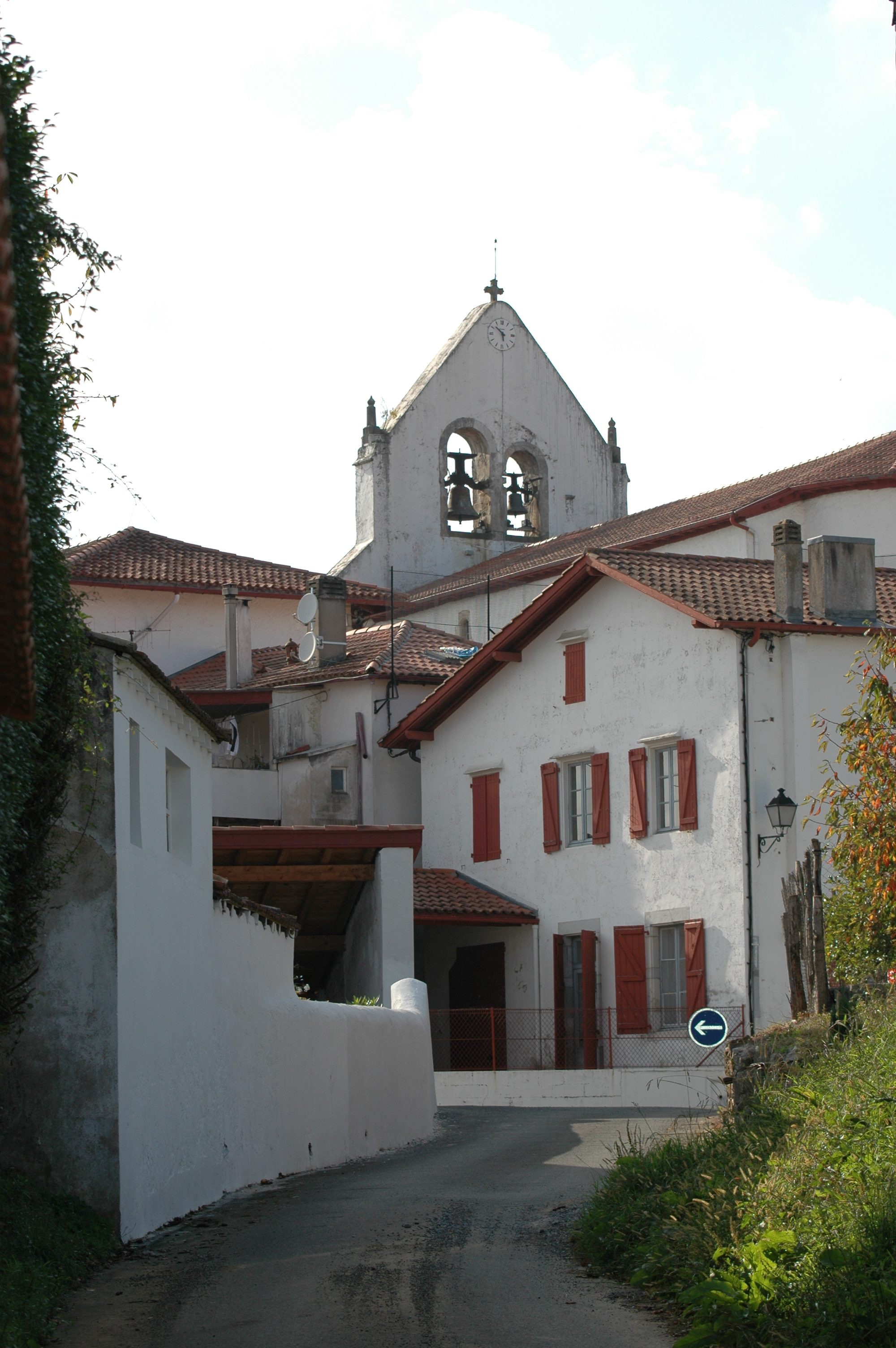
The bell tower seen from the village

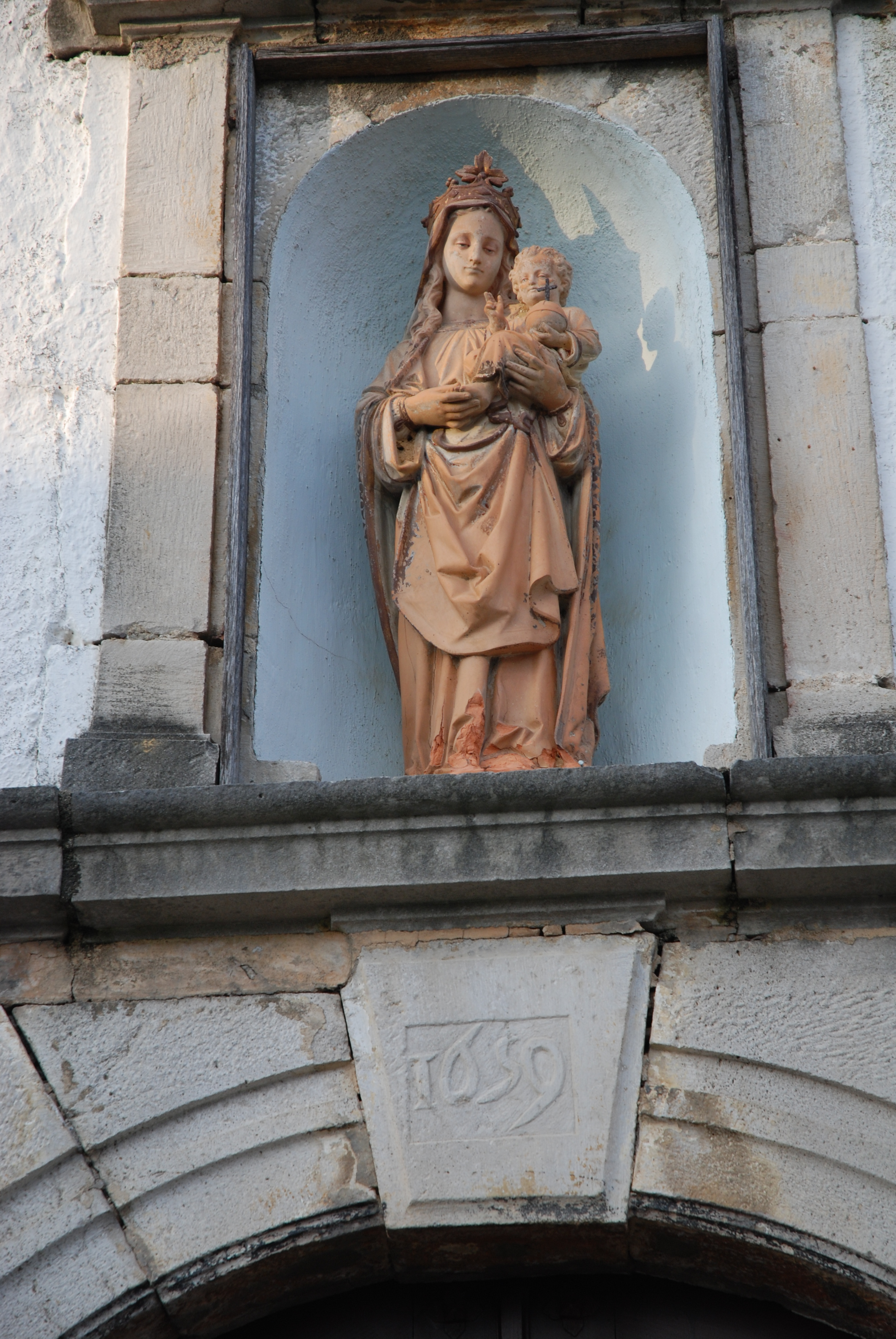
Entrance to the Church

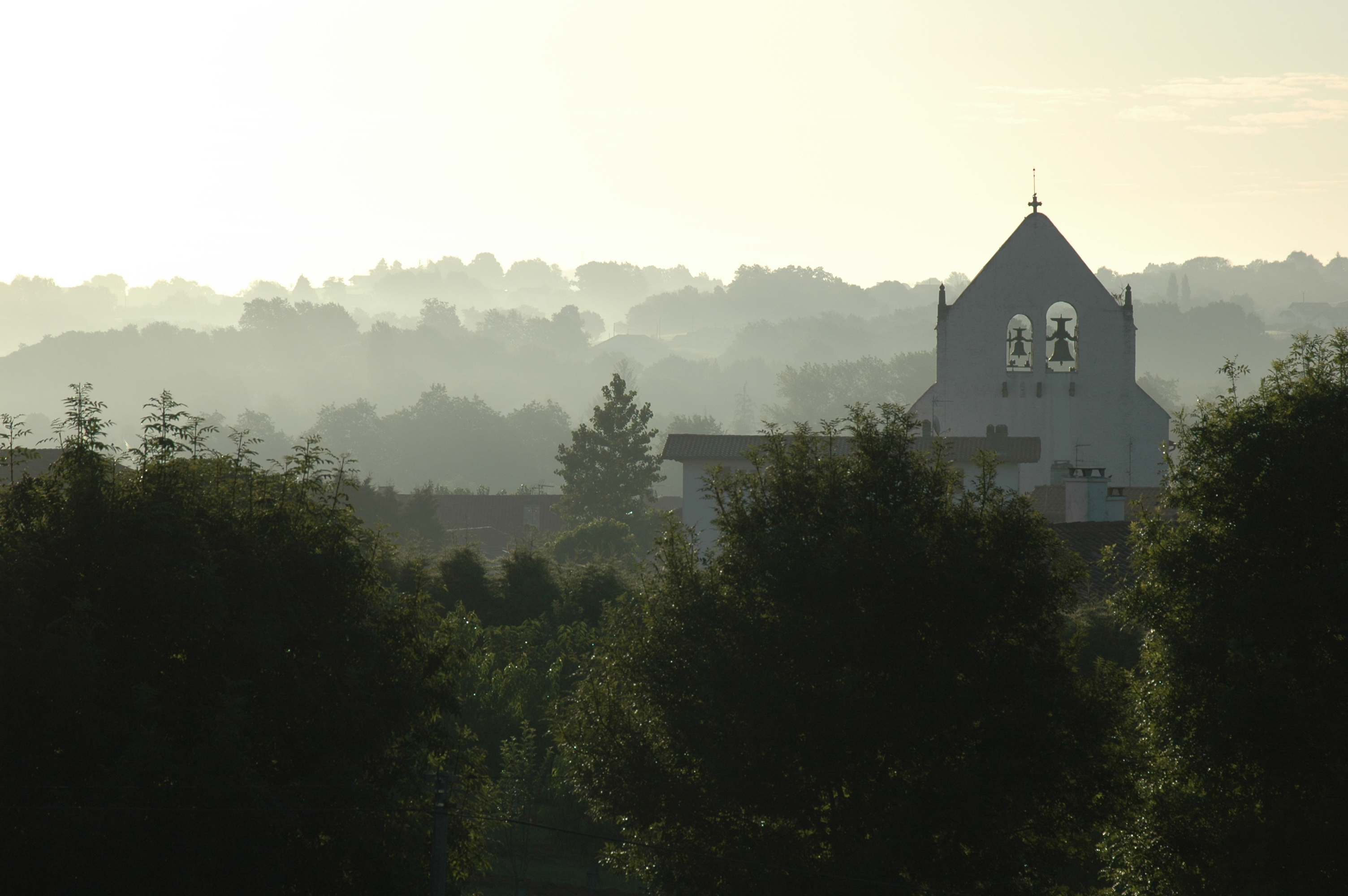
The Church

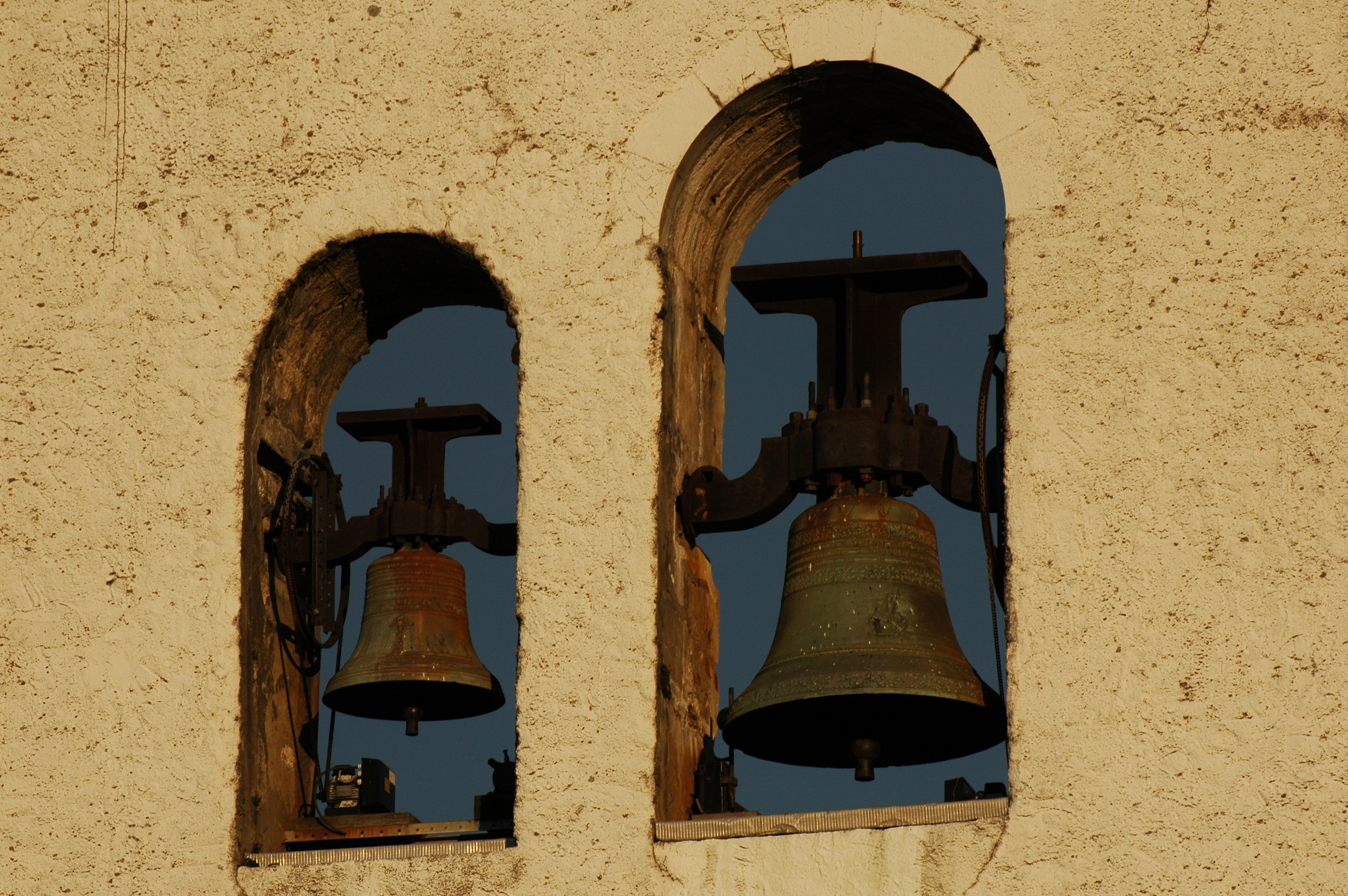
Close up of the Bells in the church

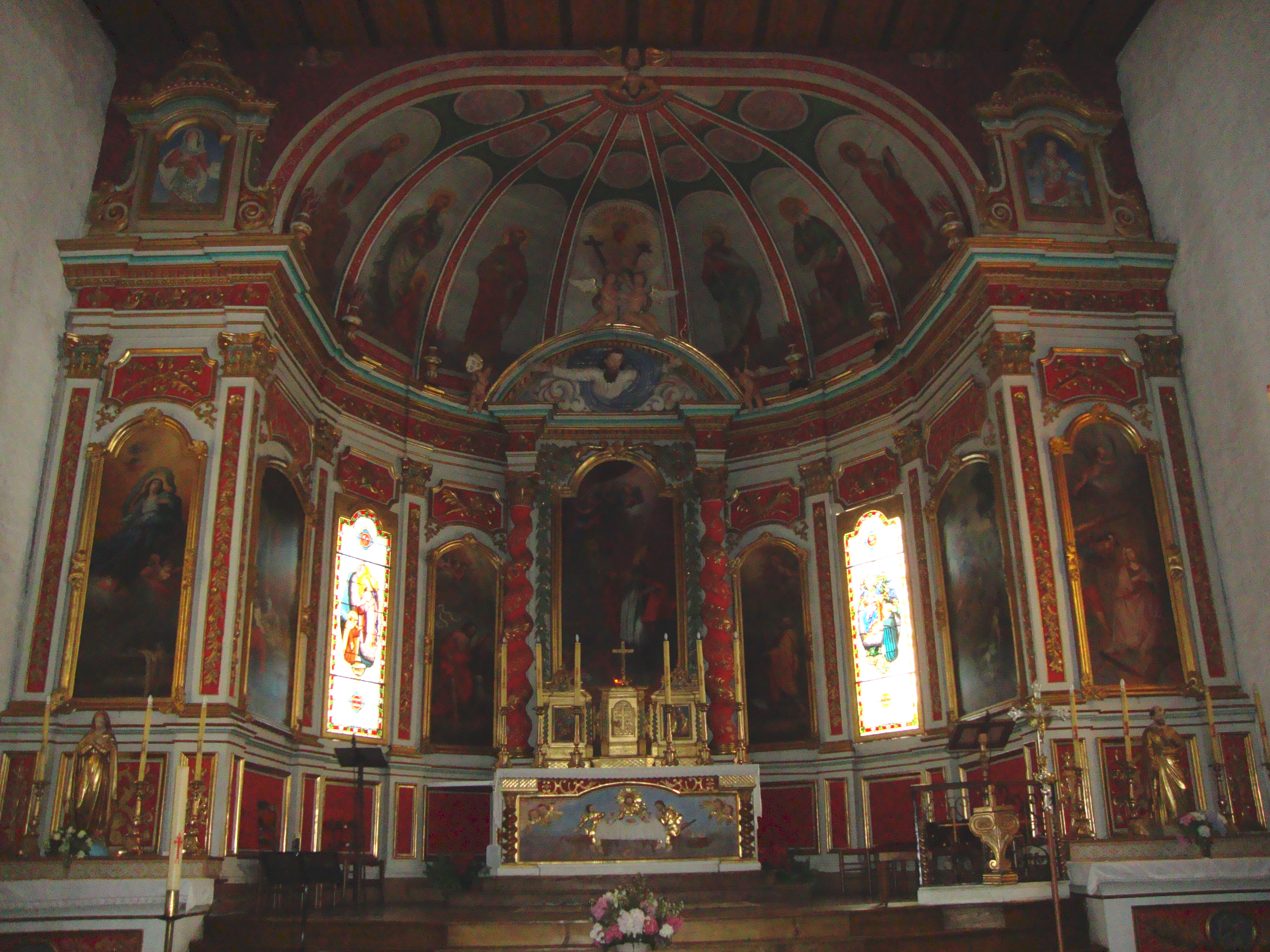
The choir of the church

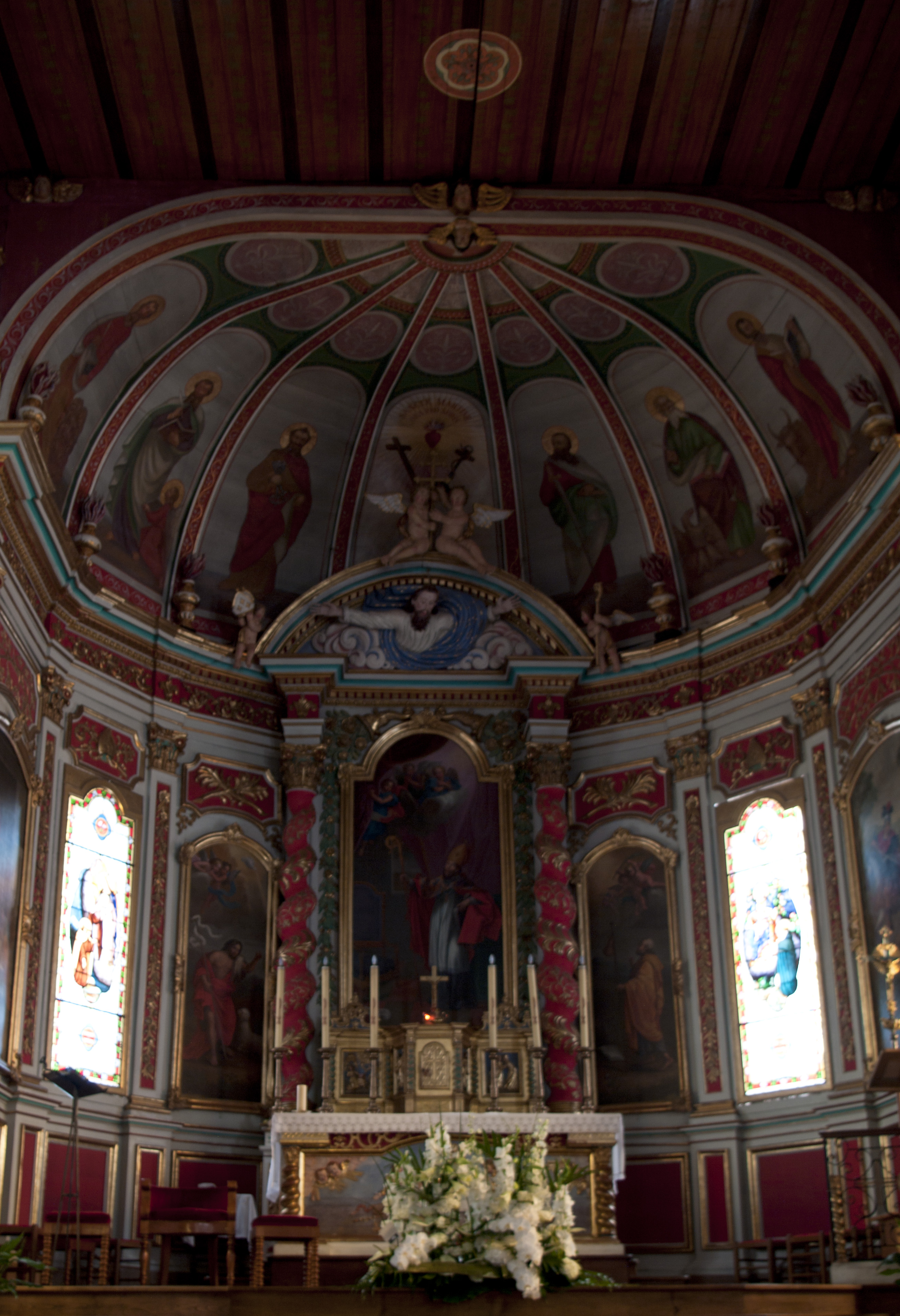
Interior of the church

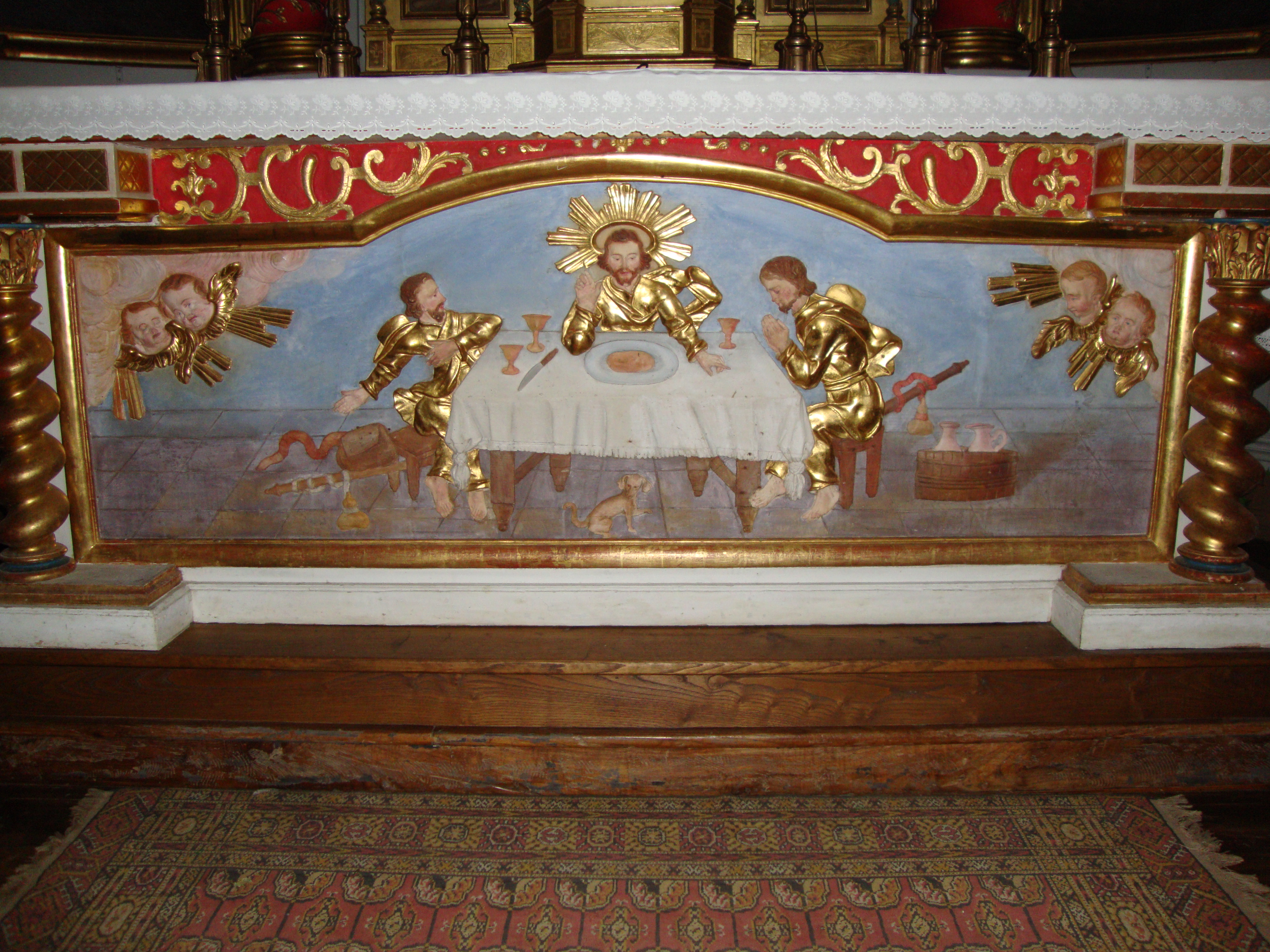
Altar with two pelerins of St. James

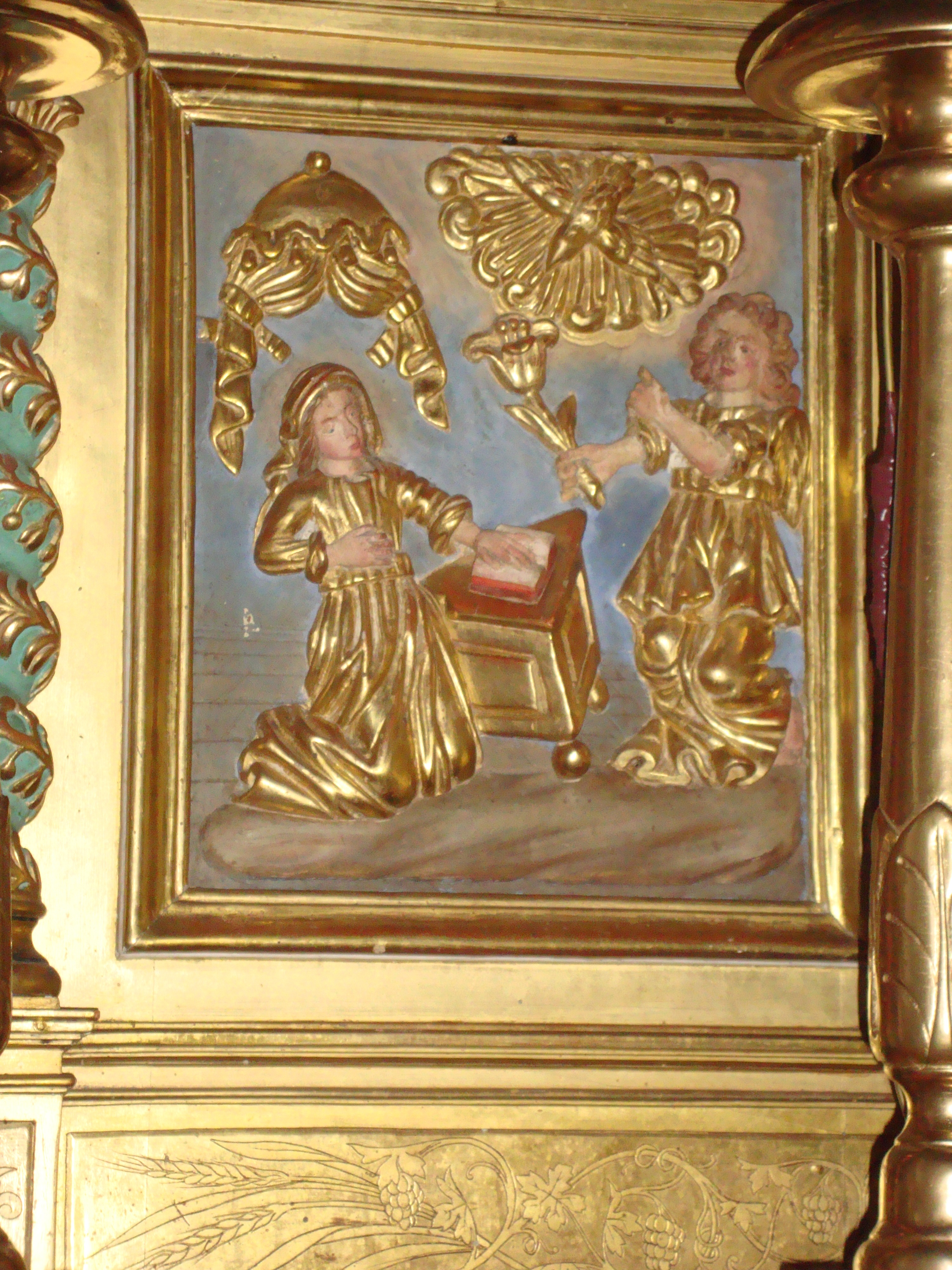
Altar piece detail: The Annunciation

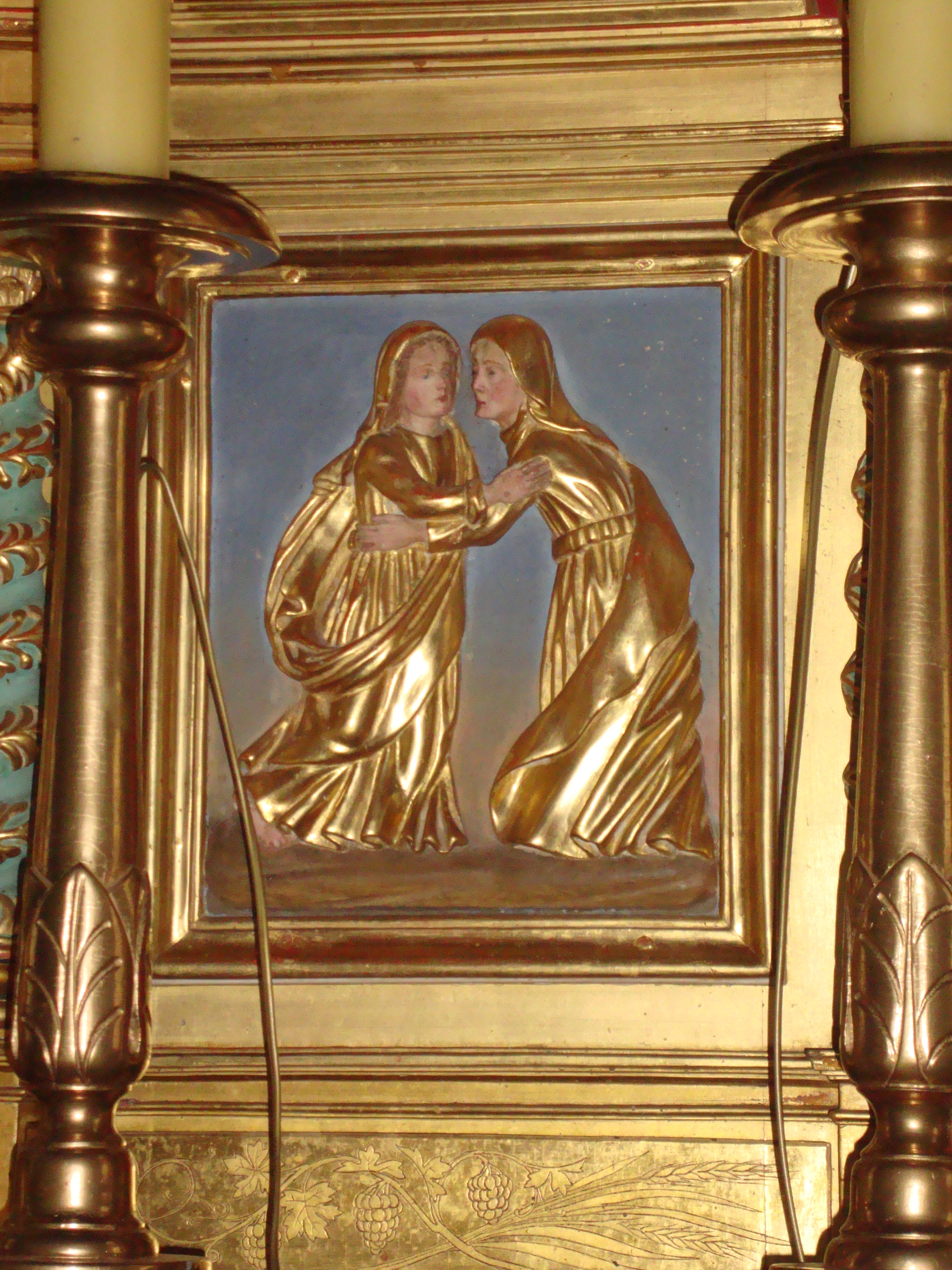
Altar piece detail: Anna greeting Maria

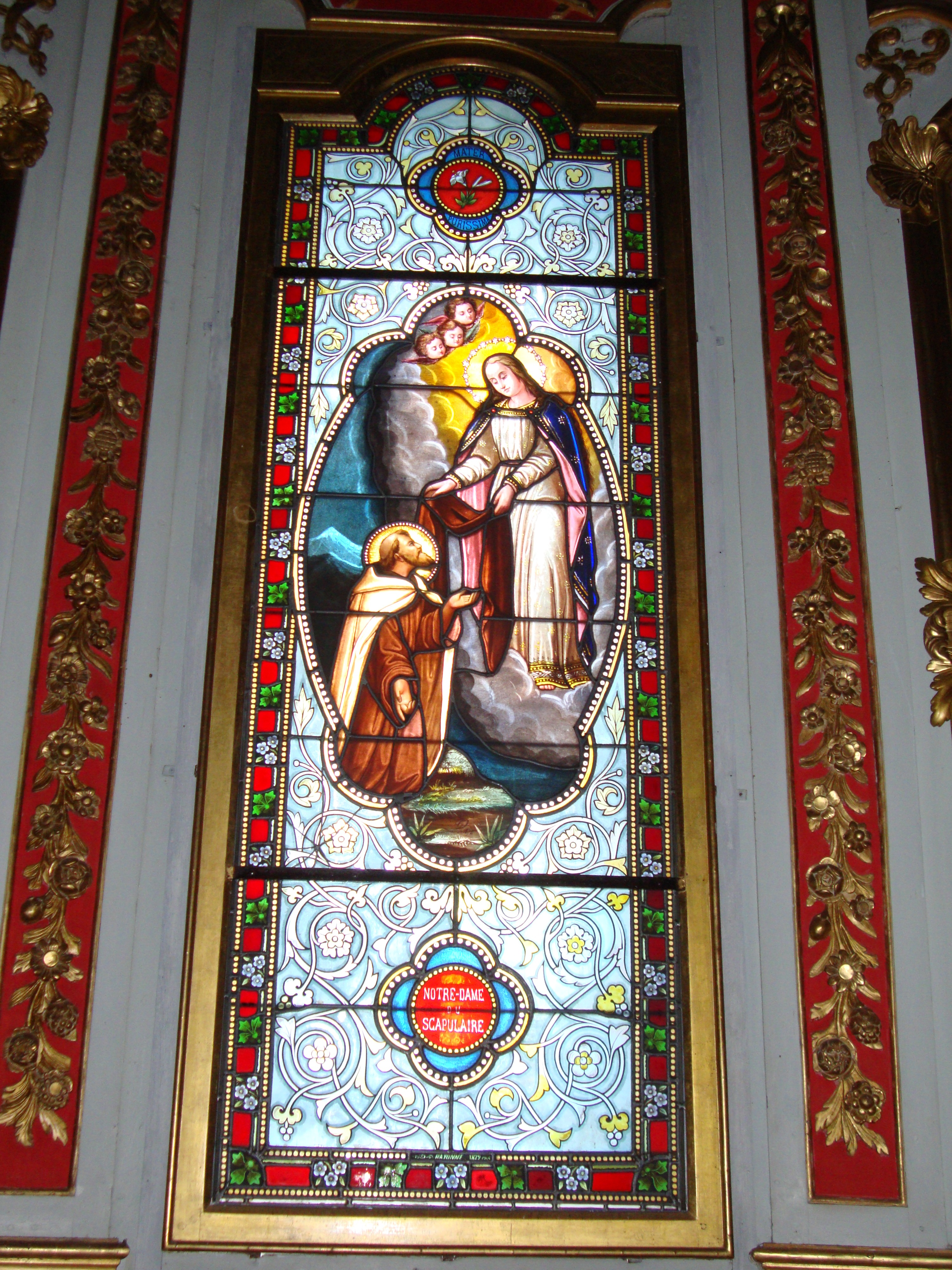
Stained glass in the church

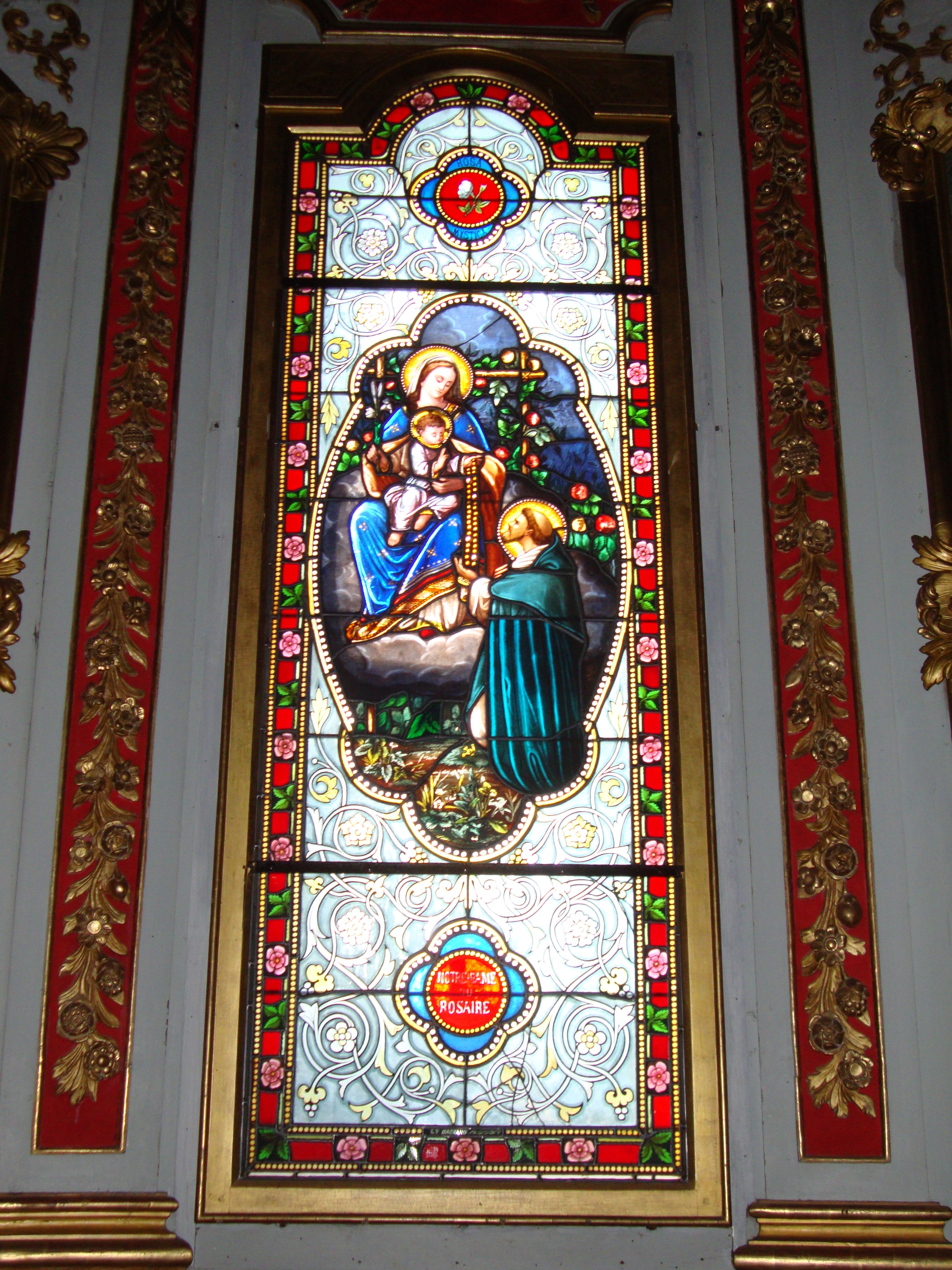
Stained Glass, Lady of the Rosary

=== Environmental heritage ===
On the heights of Ahetze all the Basque mountains near the Atlantic are visible: the Rhune, the Mondarrain, the Artzamendi, and the Ursuia in France as well as the Three Crowns in Spain.

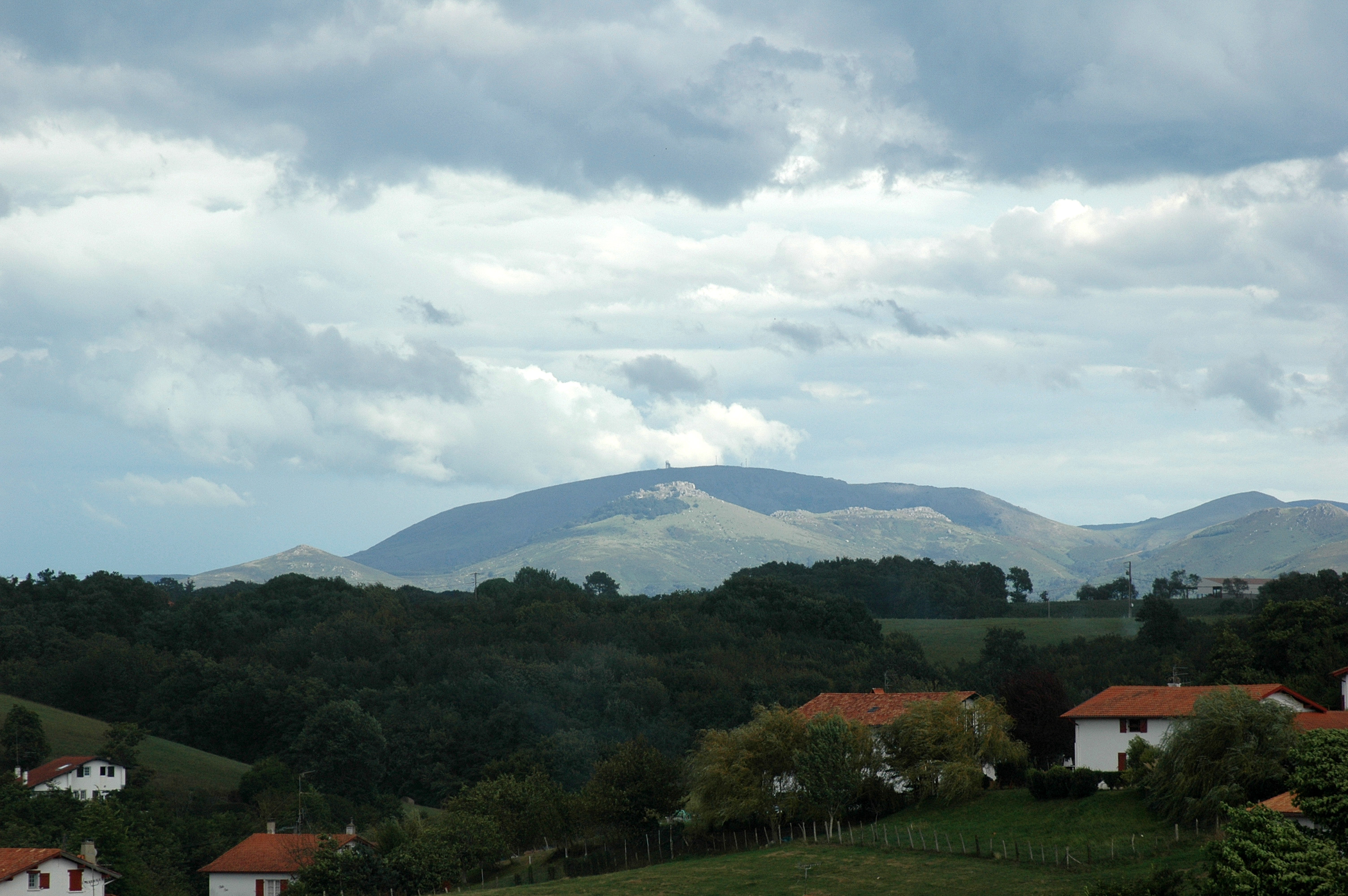
View of the Mondarrain (750m) and the Artzamendi (906m)

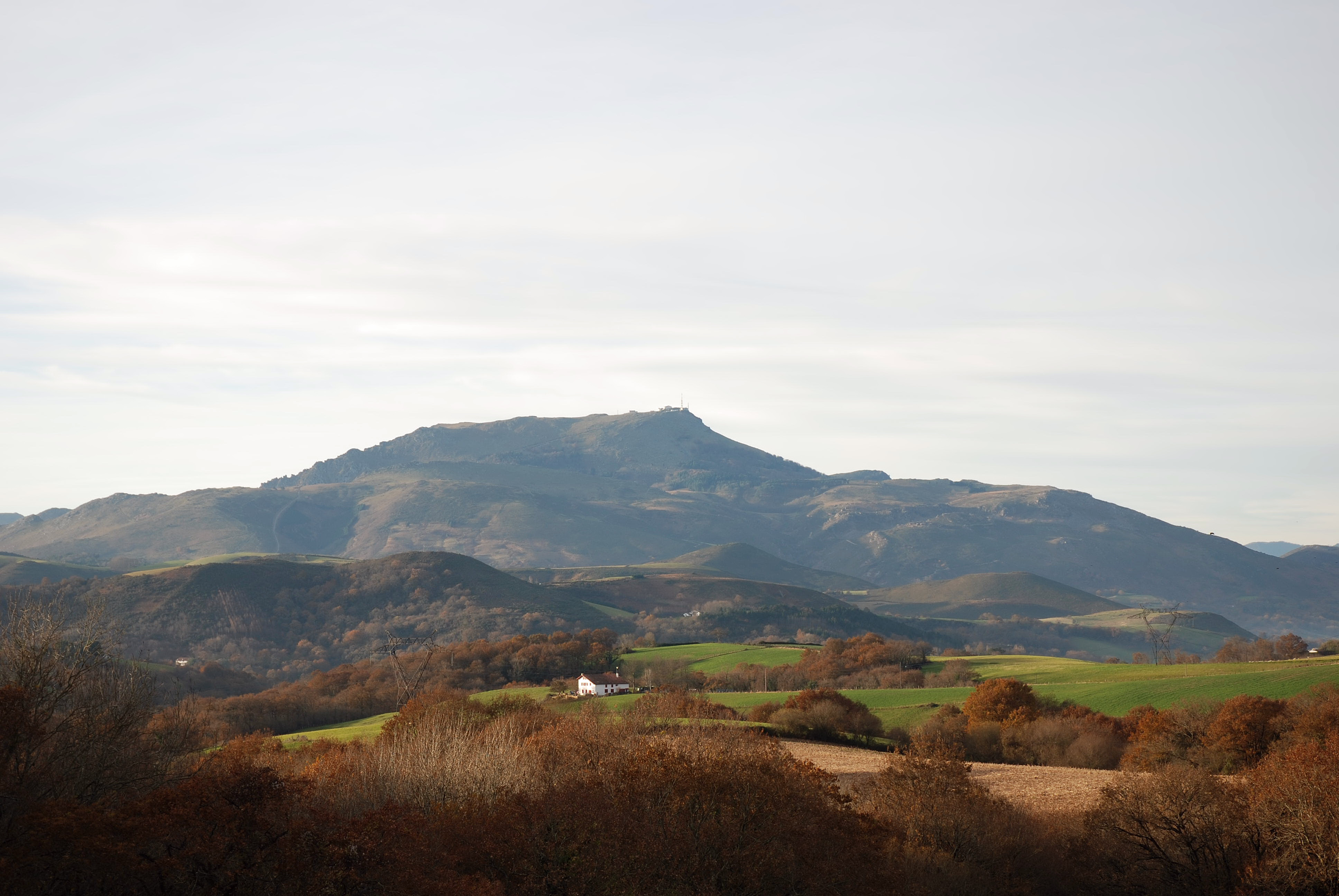
La Rhune view from Ahetze

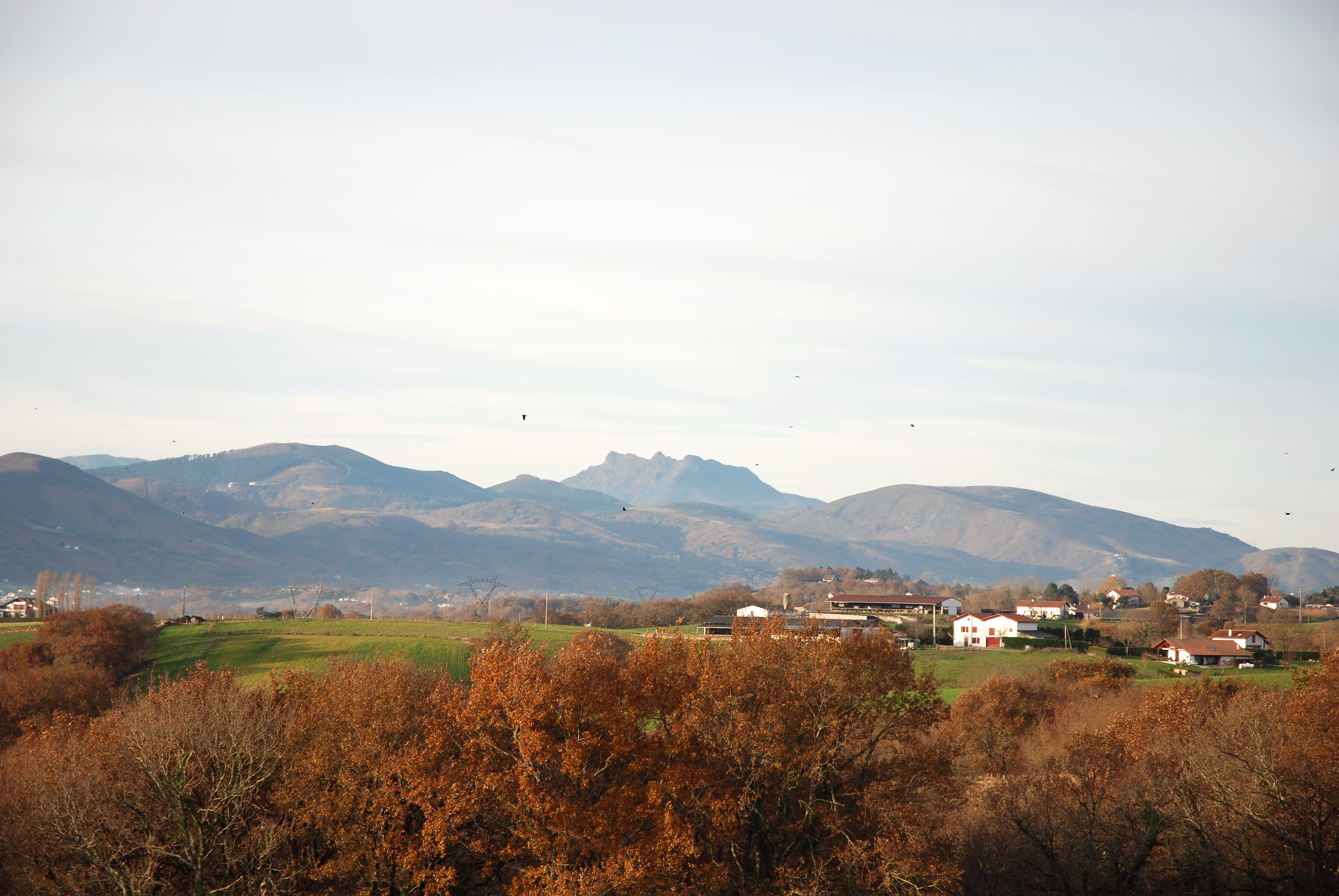
The Three Crowns, (Spain)

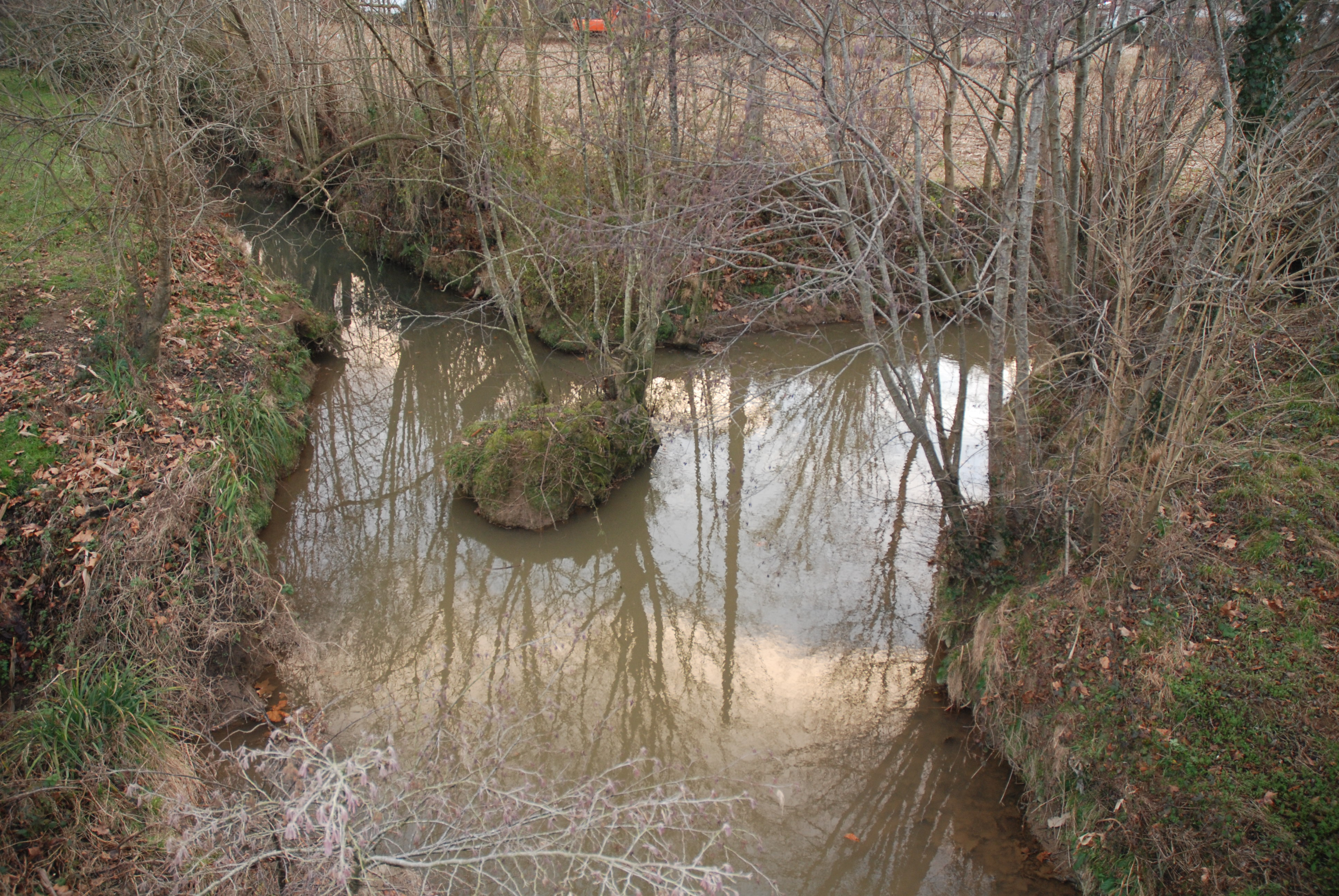
The Besaingo erreka

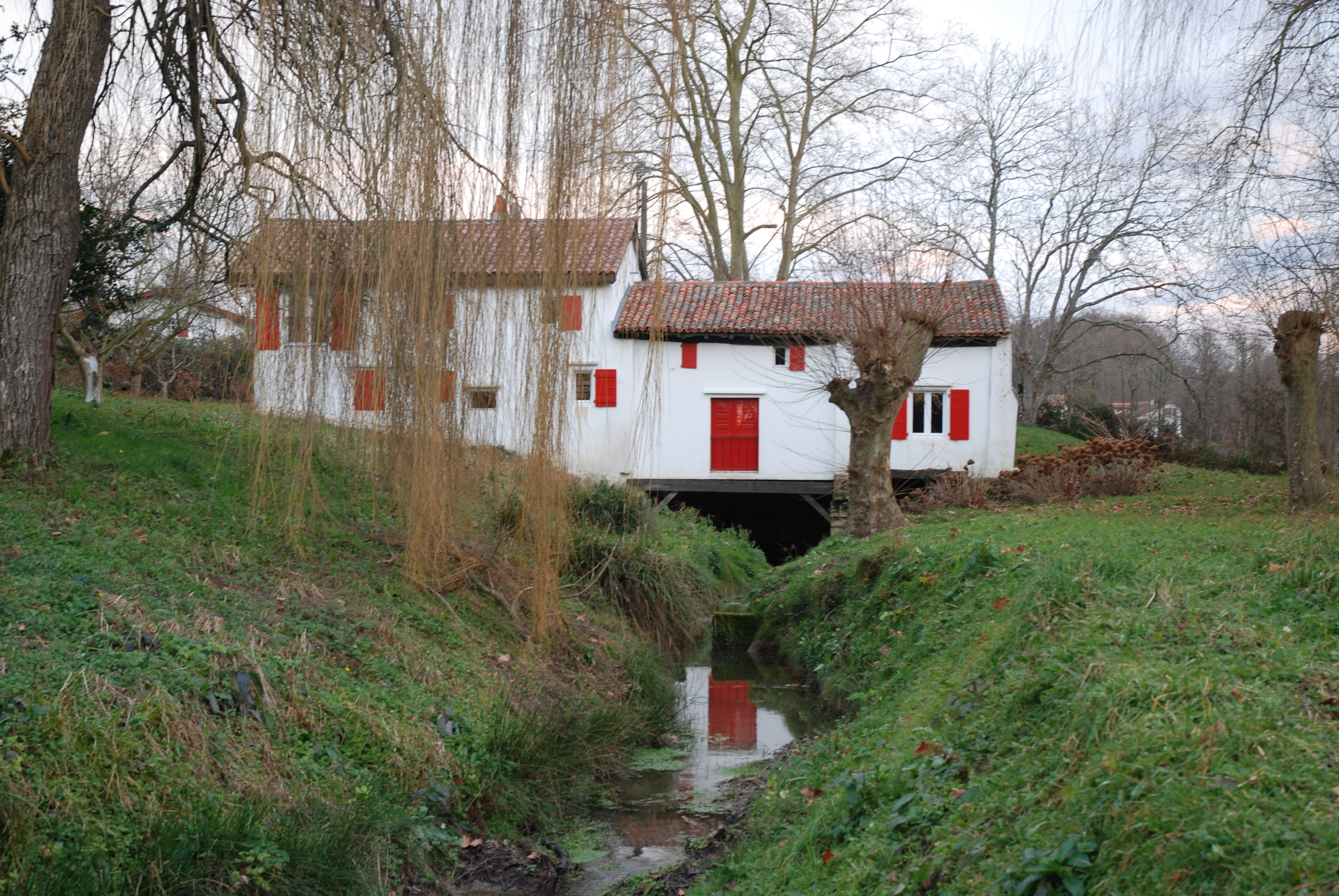
Watermill on the Besaingo erreka

== Facilities ==
=== Sports and sports facilities ===
Ahetze has two Frontons, one is old and built into the wall of the town hall, a second was completed in 2008 as part of the new development of the town.

A Trinquet called Pantxoa Sein is next to the primary school.

A marked fitness trail runs through the south-east of the village.

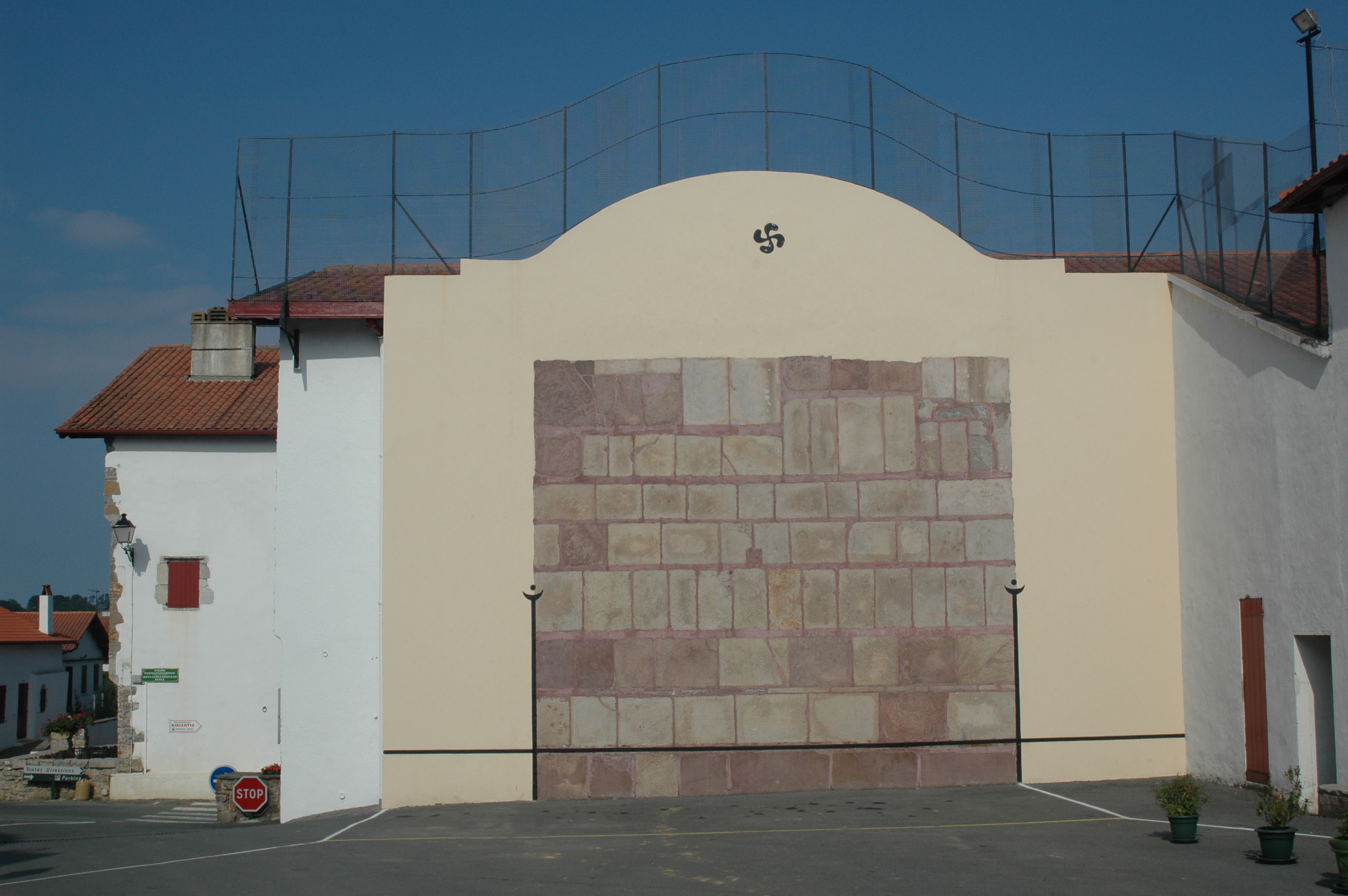
The Fronton next to the Town Hall

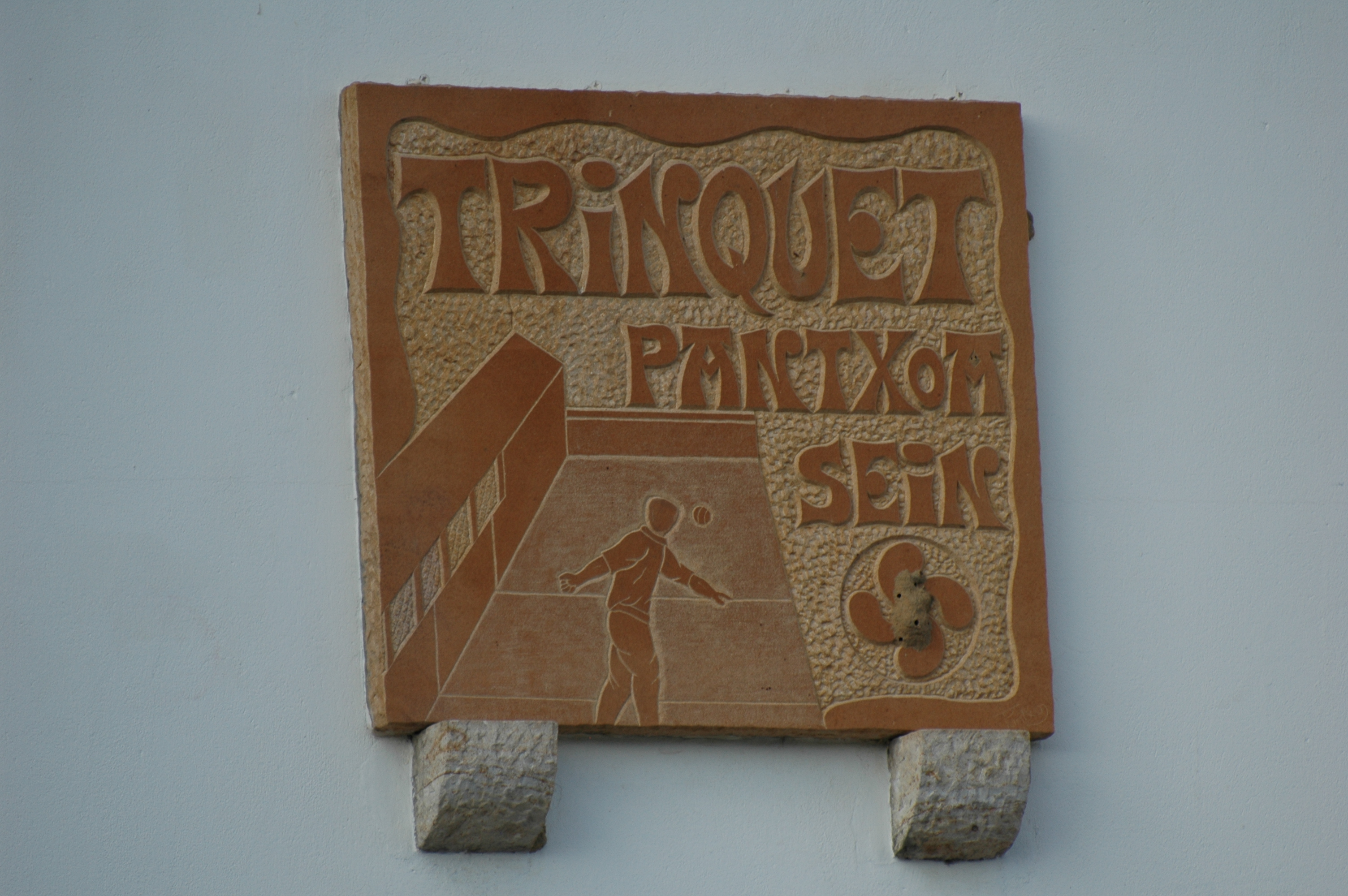
Plaque at the entrance to the Trinquet

=== Education ===
Ahetze has a primary school and a nursery.

=== Health ===
Ahetze has several health services: a general practitioner, a dentist, a nurse, a physiotherapist, and a speech therapist.

== Notable People linked to the commune ==
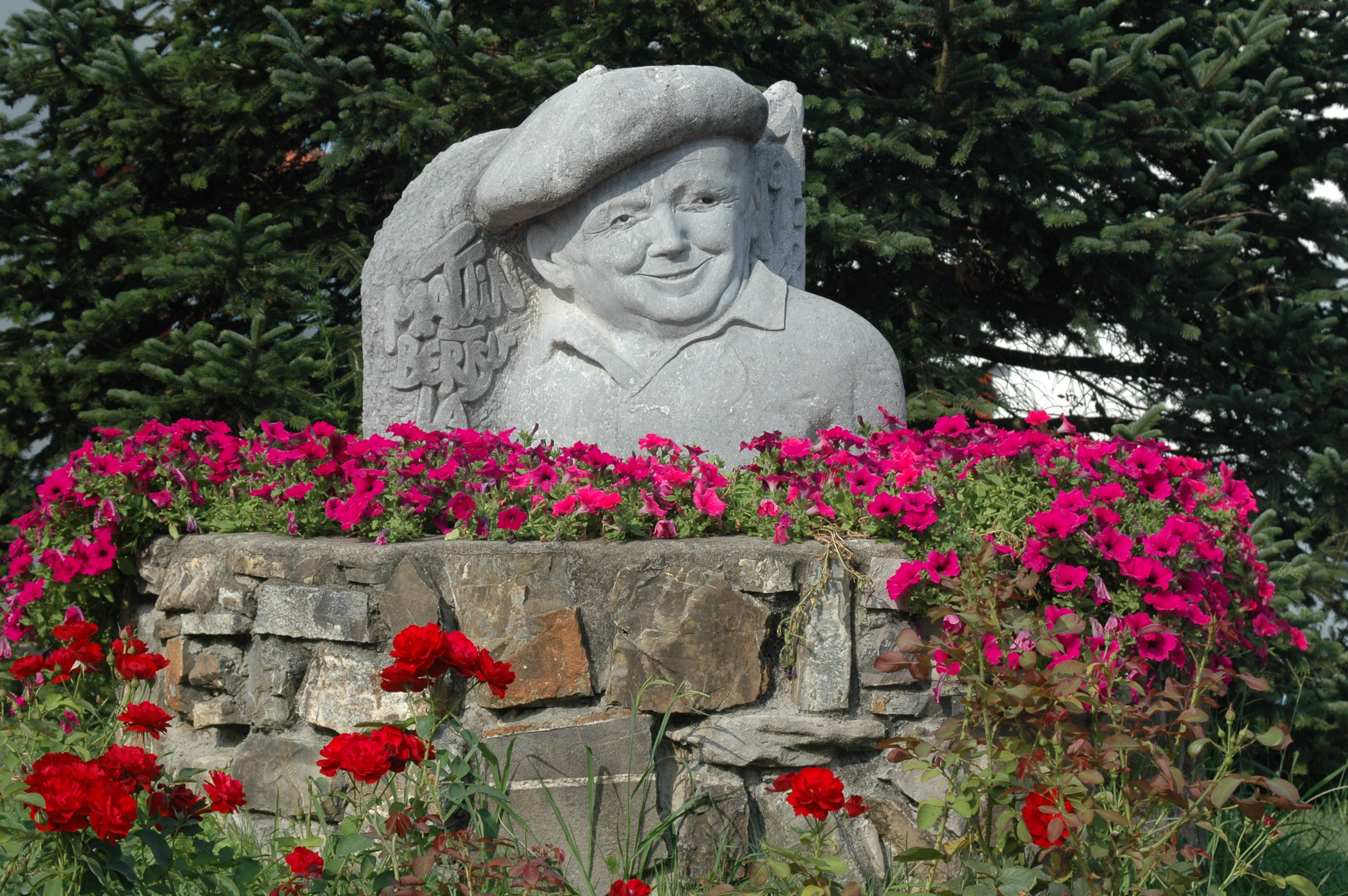
Statue of Mattin Treku, sculpted by Piarres Erdozaintzi (Note: Piarres Erdozaintzi is a sculptor born in 1957, resident in Saint-Just-Ibarre - Source: Harria et herria, Pierre et pays, Bulletin du Musée basque, 2003 (in French))

- Mattin Treku, born on 11 November 1916 in Ahetze and died on 22 July 1981 in the same commune, was a Bertsolari (singer of bertso) renowned in French Basque Country.
- Morton H. Levine, born in California and died in 1982, was a North American Anthropologist who, during the 1960s, conducted the first research that highlighted specific Basque haematology with the entire population of the villages of Macaye and Ahetze. These studies put in evidence in relation to the surrounding population the high frequency of blood group O and Rh negative and the particularities of distribution of Gm antigens and HL-A.

== See also ==
- Arrondissements of the Pyrénées-Atlantiques department
- Communes of the Pyrénées-Atlantiques department
