= Ascain =

Ascain Azkaine
- Commune
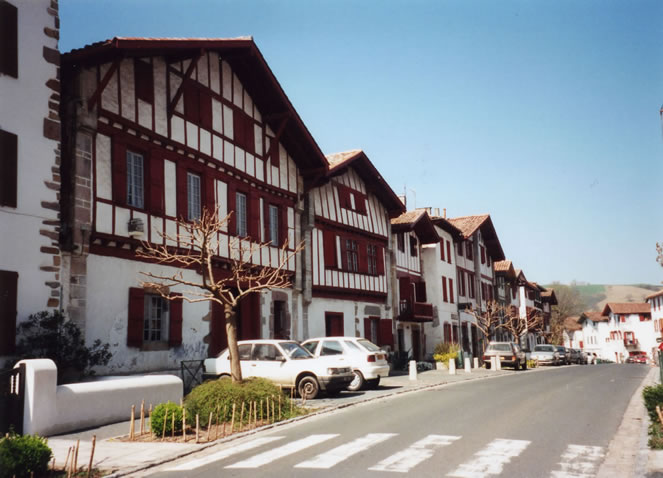
- Main street in Ascain

- Coat of arms
- Location of Ascain
- Location within France Location within Nouvelle-Aquitaine
- Coordinates: 43°20′48″N 1°37′12″W
- Country: France
- Region: Nouvelle-Aquitaine
- Department: Pyrénées-Atlantiques
- Arrondissement: Bayonne
- Canton: Ustaritz-Vallées de Nive et Nivelle
- Intercommunality: CA Pays Basque

Government
  - Mayor (2020–2026): Jean-Louis Fournier
- Area^{1}: 19.27 km^{2} (7.44 sq mi)
- Elevation: 52 m (171 ft)
- Highest elevation: 883 m (2,897 ft)
- Lowest elevation: 5 m (16 ft)
- Population (2023): 4,658
  - Density: 241.7/km^{2} (626.1/sq mi)
- Time zone: UTC+01:00 (CET)
  - Summer (DST): UTC+02:00 (CEST)
- INSEE/Postal code: 64065 /64310
- ^{1} French Land Register data, which excludes lakes, ponds, glaciers > 1 km^{2} (0.386 sq mi or 247 acres) and river estuaries.

Ascain (French pronunciation: [askain]; Basque: Azkaine) is a commune in the Pyrénées-Atlantiques department in the Nouvelle-Aquitaine region of south-western France.

The commune has been awarded three flowers by the National Council of Towns and Villages in Bloom in the Competition of cities and villages in Bloom.

== Geography ==
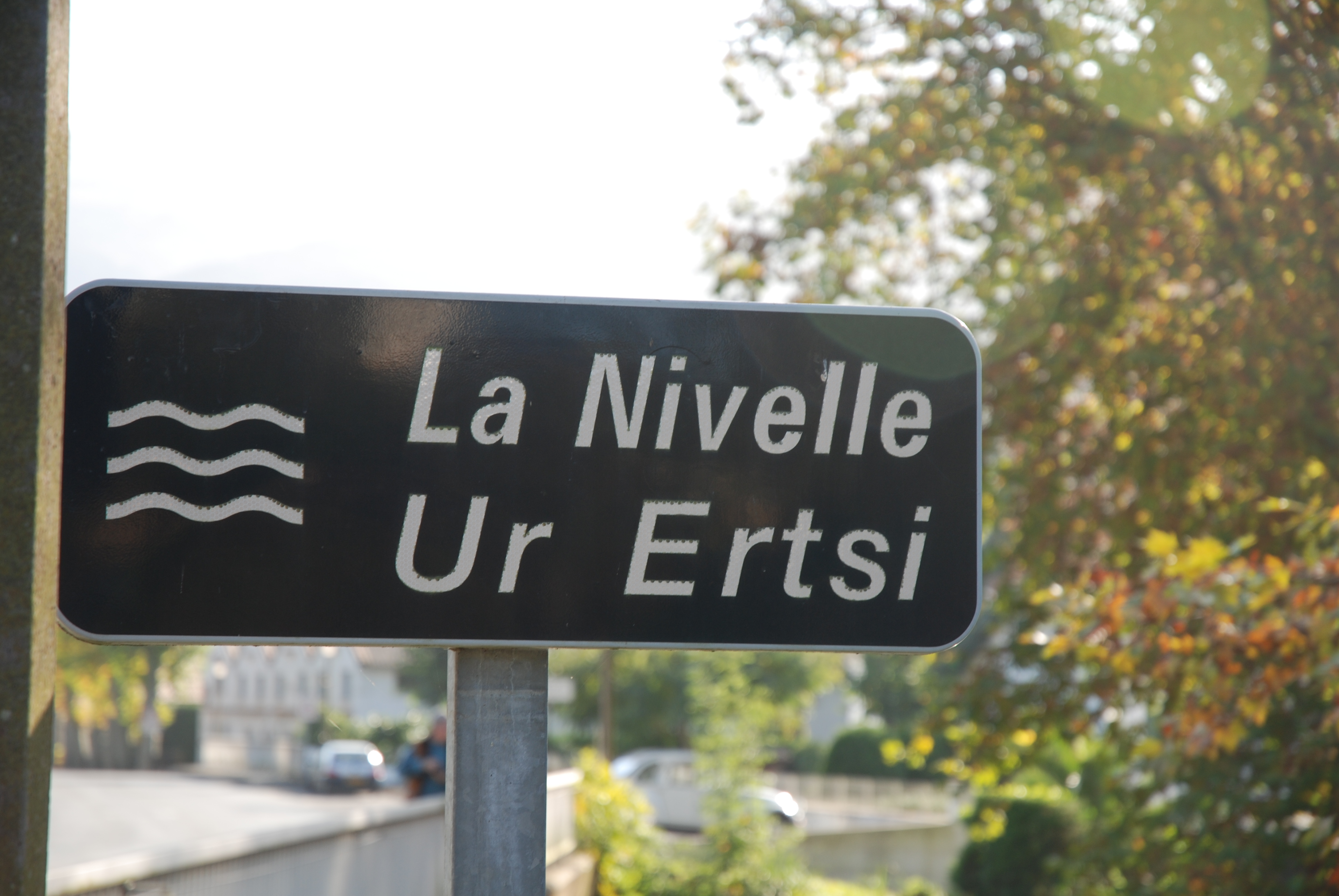
Bilingual sign at Ascain

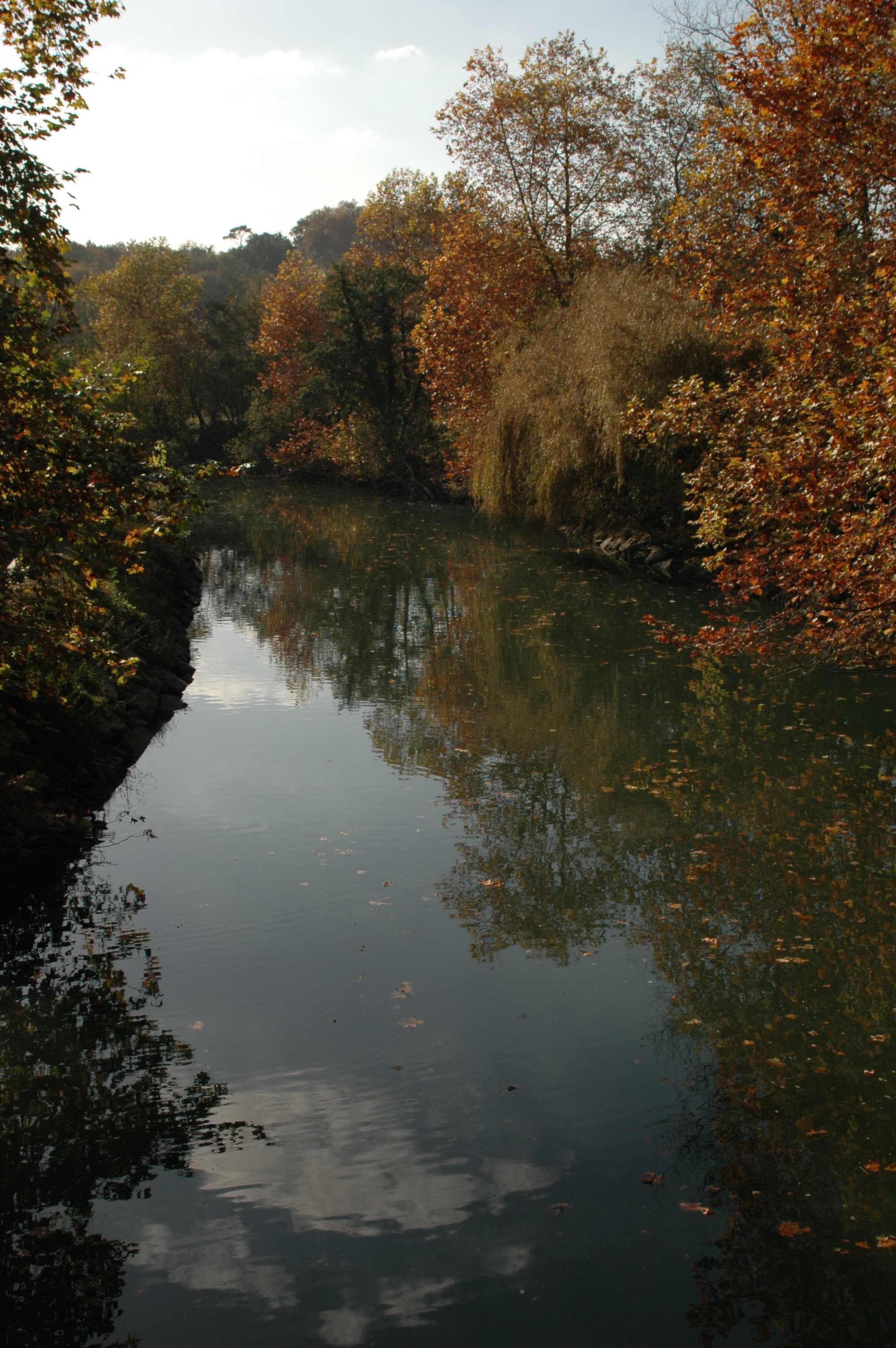
Autumn colours on the Nivelle at Ascain

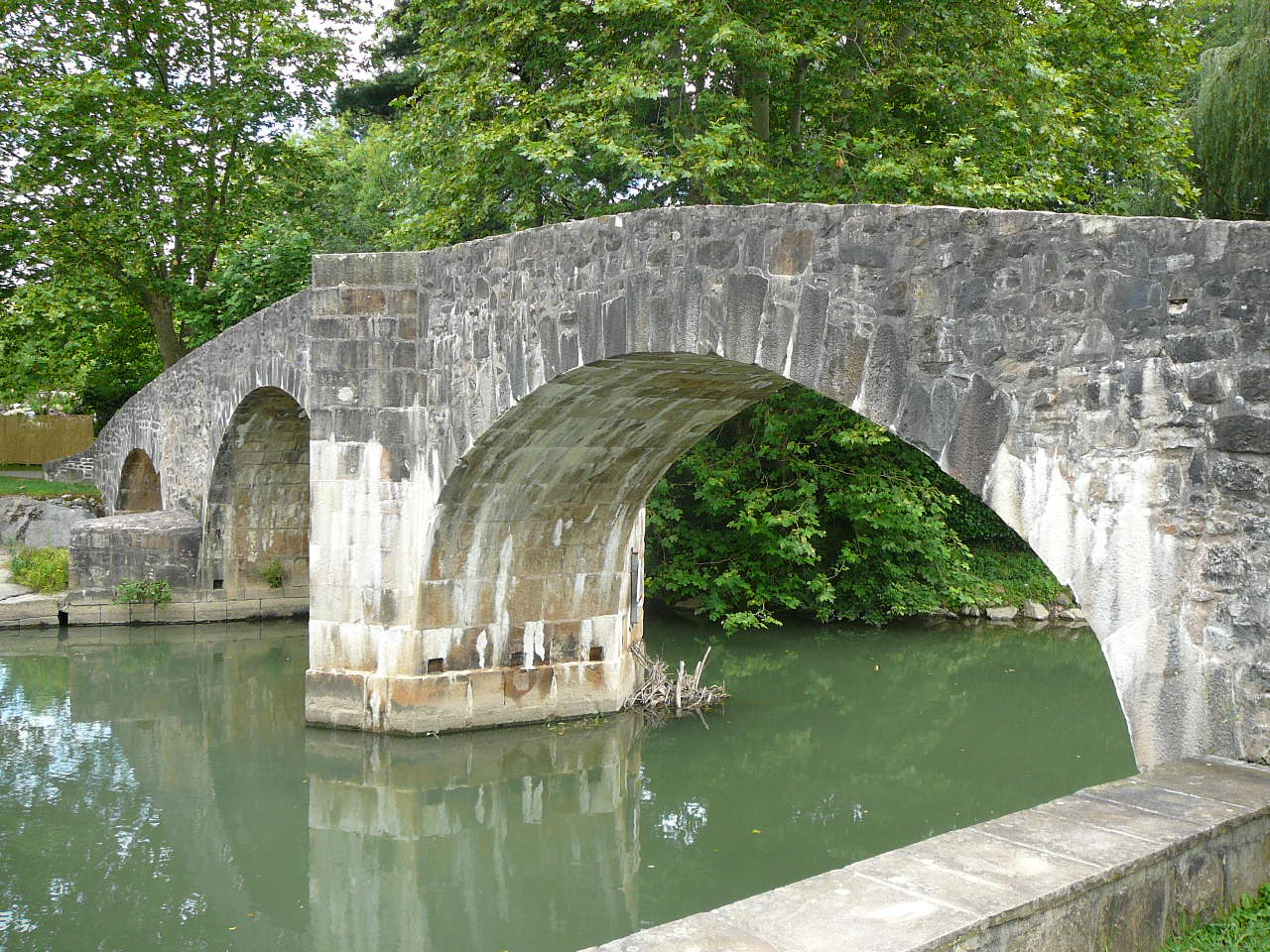
The Roman bridge

Ascain is part of the urban area of Bayonne in the traditional Basque province of Labourd 13 km east of Irun and 7 km (4.3 mi) south of Saint-Jean-de-Luz and the Atlantic Ocean in the western foothills of the Pyrenees. The southern tip of the commune touches the border with Spain at the peak of Larrun mountain. Access to the commune is by the D4 road from Urrugne in the north-west coming into the commune from the west then passing through the town and continuing south-east to Sare. The D918 also comes from Saint-Jean-de-Luz in the north and passes through the north of the commune between two urban areas and continuing east to Saint-Pée-sur-Nivelle. Some 30% of the commune is residential with some small forests in the north and farmland mostly in the south with some farms in the north.

The summit of Larrun, a mountain iconic of the Basque country, is situated approximately 6 km (3.7 mi) south of the town at the southern tip of the commune on the border with Spain. The summit can be reached by the Petit train de la Rhune, which commences from the Col de Saint-Ignace, 4 km (2.5 mi) to the east of the town outside the commune on the D4 road to Sare.

The Interurban Network of Pyrénées-Atlantiques bus line has two stops in the commune: one for Route 863 which runs from Hasparren to Saint-Jean-de-Luz; and Route 858 between Sare and Saint-Jean-de-Luz.

The Nivelle river flows through the north of the commune flowing towards the west parallel to the D918 on its way to the Atlantic Ocean. Several tributaries rise in the south of the commune and flow north, gathering many more tributaries, into the Nivelle. These streams include the Aniberreko Erreka, the Galardiko Erreka, and the Arraioko Erreka. The Larrunko Erreka forms the south-western border of the commune as it flows north then west to join the Intsolako Erreka which continues north to join the Aniberreko Erreka.

=== Places and hamlets ===
- Aïra-Harri
- Aldagarai
- Ansorlua
- Apituxenborda
- Arginenia
- Arraioa
- Askubea
- Biscarzoun or Bizkarzun (redoubt)
- Bordatxoenia
- Dorria
- Errotenea
- Esnaur (redoubt)
- Etxegaraia
- Hiriburua
- Ihizelaia
- Indartea
- Jauregikoborda
- Kisu Labea
- Lanzelai (ZA)
- Larrunzola
- Lur Eder
- Manttobaita
- Martinhaurrenborda
- Miramar
- Monségur
- Morzelai
- Muga
- Nausienborda
- Oihanetxeberria
- Paxkulinenea
- Portua
- Urritzagakoborda
- Sabadinenborda
- Sainte-Hélène
- Serres
- Telleriaberria
- Xakarroko Errota
- Xeruenborda
- Xorroetaberria
- Xuanenborda
- Zelaia
- Zelaiakoborda

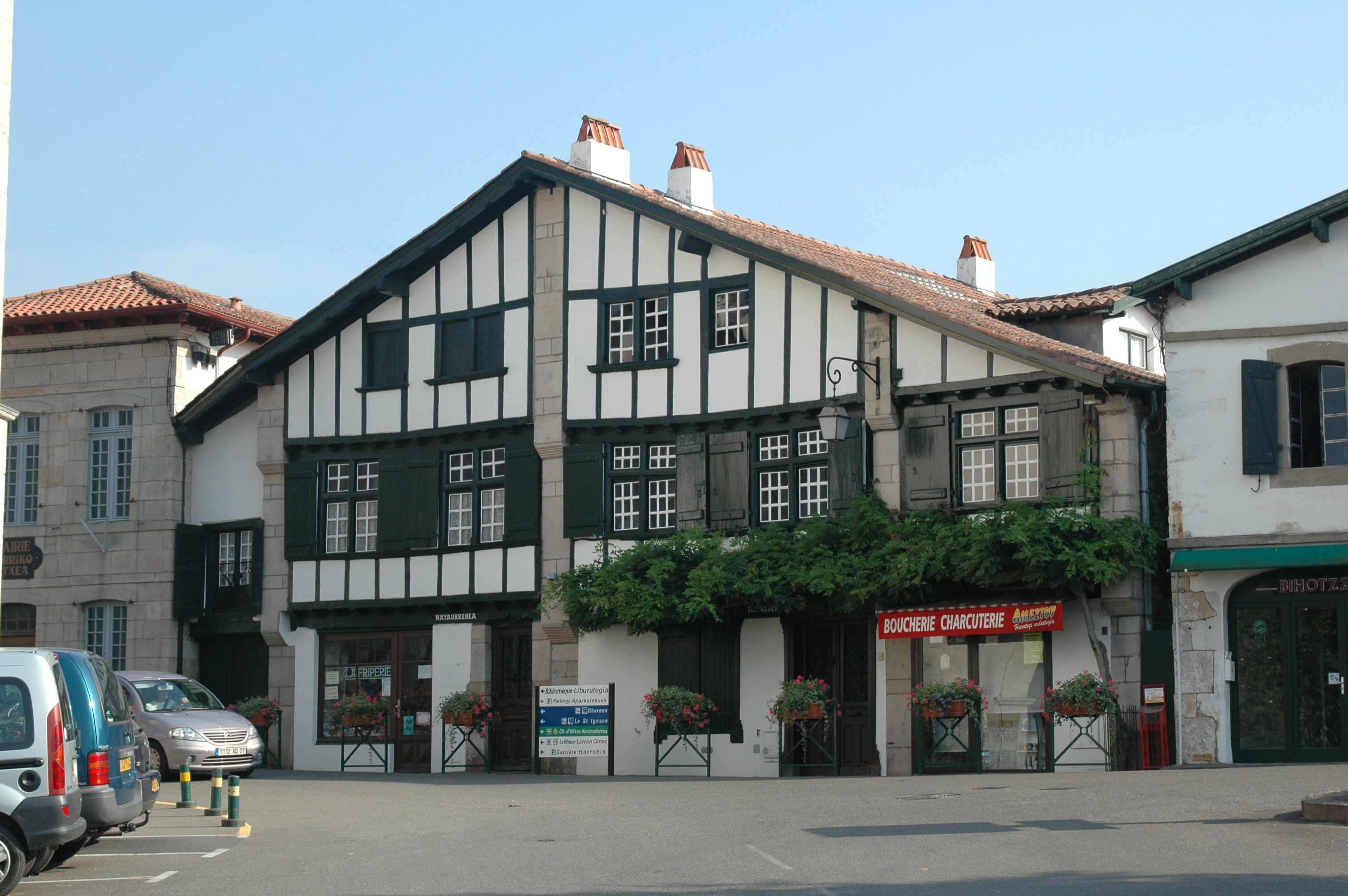
Labourdine house

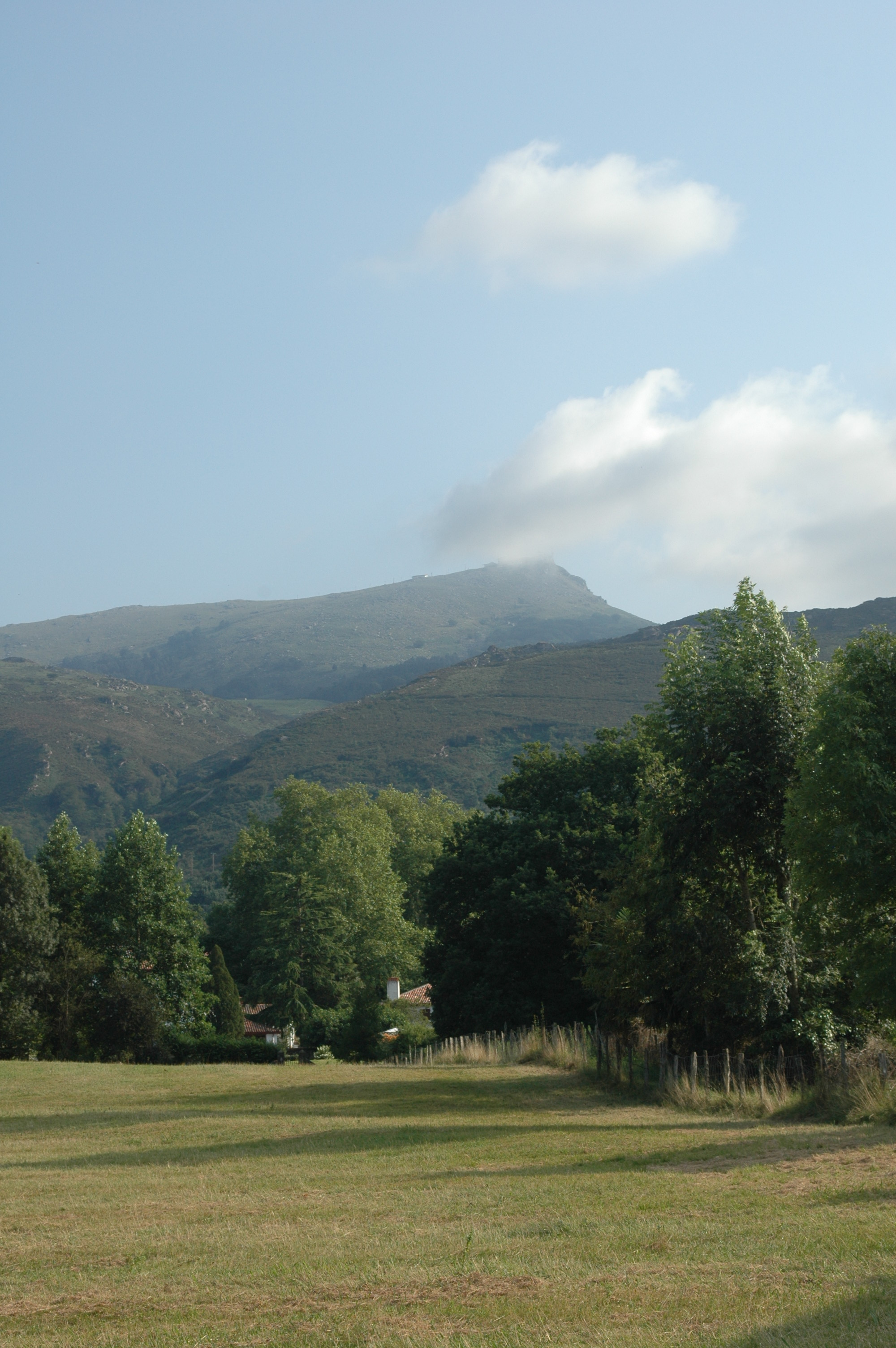
View of Larrun

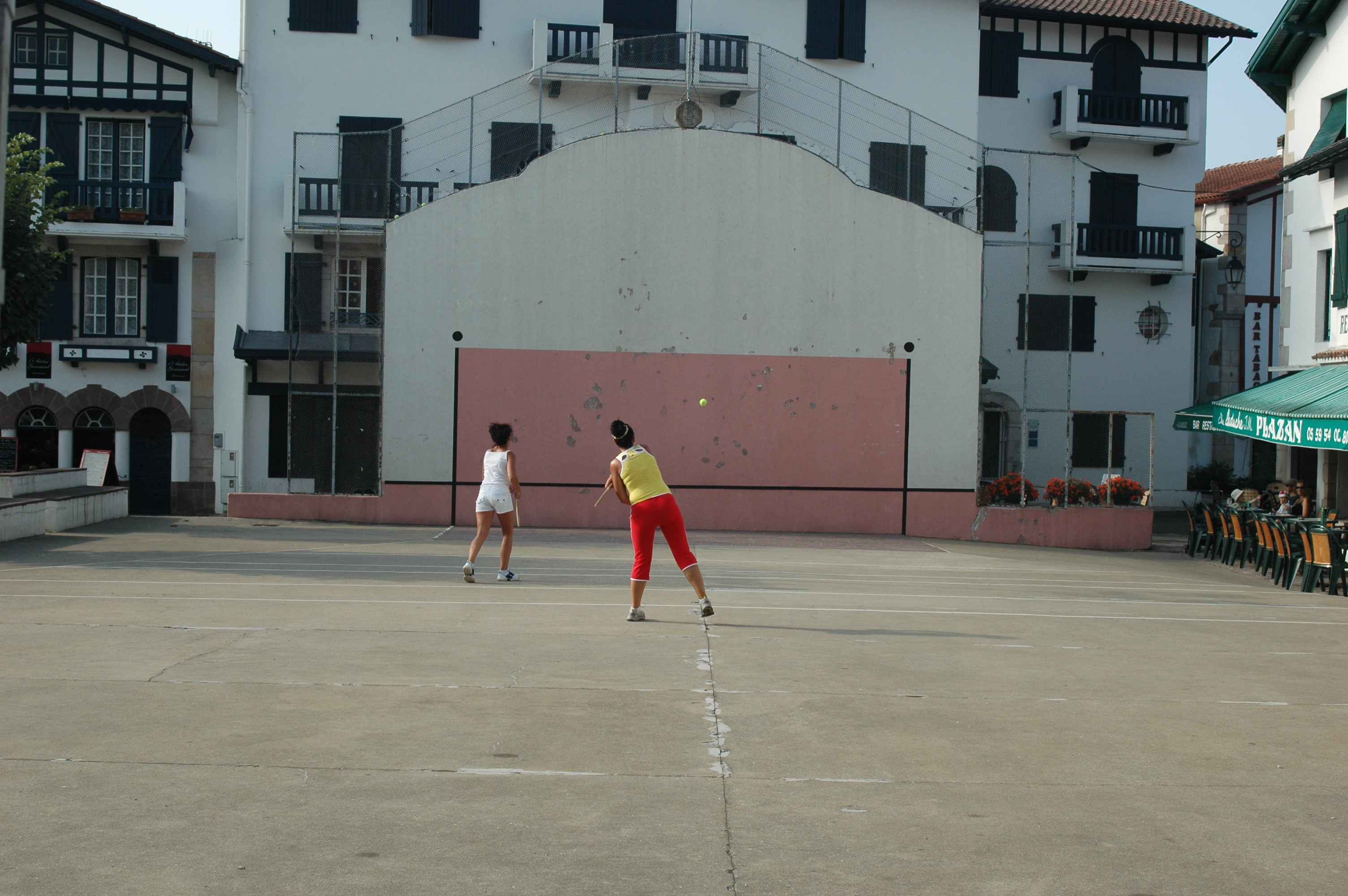
The fronton

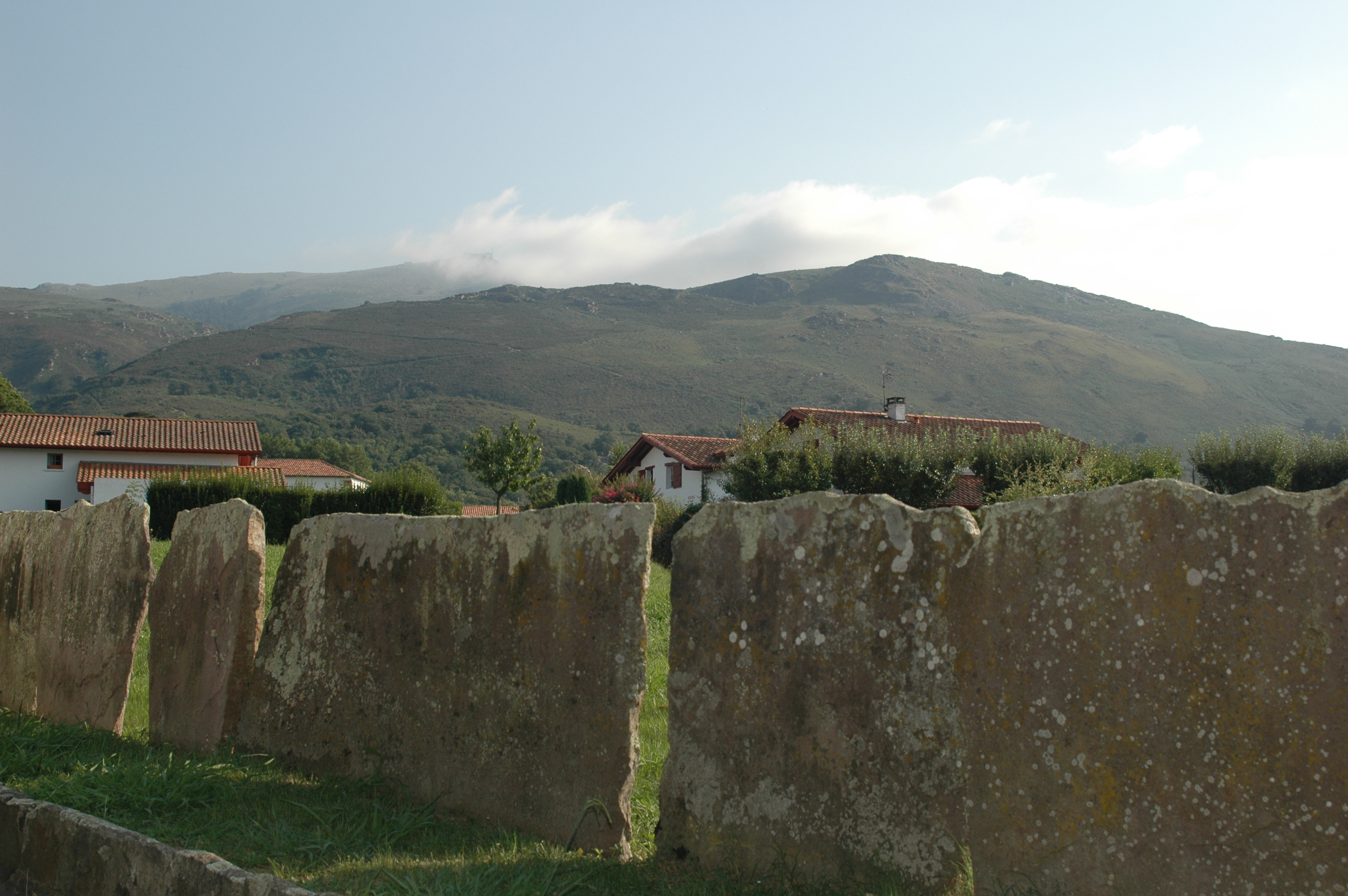
Stones from Larrun enclosing a field

== Toponymy ==
The commune name in basque is Azkaine.

The name Ascain probably comes from haitz gain meaning "top of the hill" or "rocky height".

The following table details the origins of the commune name and other names in the commune.

Name	Spelling	Date	Source	Page	Origin	Description
Ascain	Escan	1125	Goyheneche	583		Village
	Escan	1140	Raymond	14	Bayonne	
	Scain	1235	Raymond	14	Bayonne	
	Azcayn	1302	Raymond	14	Chapter	
	Scainh	1450	Raymond	14	Labourd	
	Ascaing	1552	Raymond	14	Labourd	
	Sancta Maria d'Ascaing	1691	Raymond	14	Collations	
	Askaine	19th century	Lhande			
Harania	Harania	1863	Raymond	75		Hamlet
Olhaberrietta	Olhaberrietta	1568	Orpustan	37		House: "Place of the new hut"
Serres	Villa quœ dicitur Asseres	1140	Raymond	160	Bayonne	
	Sanctus-Jacobus de Serres	1691	Raymond	160	Collations	
Croix d'Urumendy	Croix d'Urumendy	1863	Raymond	172		Place of Pilgrimage
Xeruenborda	Chérumborda	1863	Raymond	49		Place of Pilgrimage

Sources:

- Goyheneche: Eugène Goyheneche, Basque Country: Soule, Labourd, Basse-Navarre
- Raymond: Topographic Dictionary of the Department of Basses-Pyrenees, 1863, on the page numbers indicated in the table. (in French)
- Lhande: Basque-French Dictionary by Pierre Lhande.
- Orpustan: Jean-Baptiste Orpustan, New Basque Toponymy

Origins:

- Bayonne: Cartulary of Bayonne or Livre d'Or (Book of Gold)
- Chapter: Titles of the Chapter of Bayonne
- Labourd: Titles of Labourd
- Collations: Collations of the Diocese of Bayonne

== History ==
In 1609 Councillor Pierre de Lancre intervened in French Basque Country at the head of a commission of inquiry demanded by Henri IV. The commission was to "purge the country of all sorcerers and sorceresses under the influence of demons". The priest of Ascain was degraded then burned.

The Bishop of Bayonne, Jean VI de Sossiondo, built a large house called "Askunda" here during the middle of the 16th century, which can still be seen.

In 1794, at the height of The Terror and after the desertion of 47 young people from Itxassou, the Committee of Public Safety (Decree of 13 Ventôse Year II - 3 March 1794) arrested and deported some of the men, women, and children from Ainhoa, Ascain, Espelette, Itxassou, Sare, and Souraïde; and declared the commune, as for other communes near the Spanish border, a "Notorious commune". This measure was also extended to Biriatou, Cambo, Larressore, Louhossoa, Mendionde, and Macaye.

The inhabitants were: "gathered in various national houses or in the District of Ustaritz or in those of the Grande Redoubt, such as Jean-Jacques Rousseau". In reality they were gathered in the churches then deported in very precarious conditions to Bayonne, Capbreton, Saint-Vincent-de-Tyrosse, and Ondres. Departments where people from the communes were interned were Lot, Lot-et-Garonne, Gers, Landes, Basses-Pyrénées (the Béarnais part), and Hautes-Pyrénées.

The return of the exiles and the recovery of their properties were determined by a series of decrees issued on 29 September and 1 October 1794 - driven in this direction by the Director of Ustaritz: "The former communes of Sare, Itxassou, Ascain, Biriatou, and Serres, whose inhabitants have been interned for eight months as a measure of general security people have not been able to farm. The people who wish to obtain freedom to retire to their homes are clamouring for food without us being able to provide them with the means to fulfil this first human need, hunger". The recovery of property was not done without difficulty: their properties had been sequestered but were not registered and so were looted: "Movable and immovable property of the inhabitants of Sare, were neither legally recognized nor disclosed; all our furniture and household effects were removed and brought confusedly to neighbouring communes. Instead of putting them in safe places, some were sold at auction or to any other party without auction".

=== Heraldry ===
Arms of Ascain	The arms were adopted by the commune on 26 June 1988. Blazon: Or, an oak Vert terraced in base the same, fruited in Or and trunked proper all debruised by a boar armed Argent bordure of Gules charged with 8 small saltires couped of Or.

These arms were registered for the first time on 5 July 1405 by Juan Martinez de Agorreta y Ascain, Lord of Agorreta and Ascain, who married Princess Leonor Tocco de Acciaioli, from the Florence House of Acciaioli.

== Administration ==
List of Successive Mayors

Mayors from 1808 to 1941

From	To	Name
1808	1813	Michel Monségur
1813	1814	Pierre Theillary
1814	1828	Michel Monségur
1828	1837	Jean Pagès
1837	1844	Jean Gracy
1844	1848	Raymond Monségur
1848	1856	Dominique Hirigoyen
1856	1864	Gustave Hillaire Argelliès
1864	1867	Raymond Monségur
1867	1877	Dominique Hirigoyen
1877	1883	Jean called "Ganich" Gracy
1883	1891	Jean Etcheverry
1891	1900	Jean Larralde
1900	1904	Dominique Berho
1904	1906	René Minier
1906	1912	Jean Gracy
1912	1919	Jean Leholaberry
1919	1924	René Minier
1924	1941	Pierre Pinatel

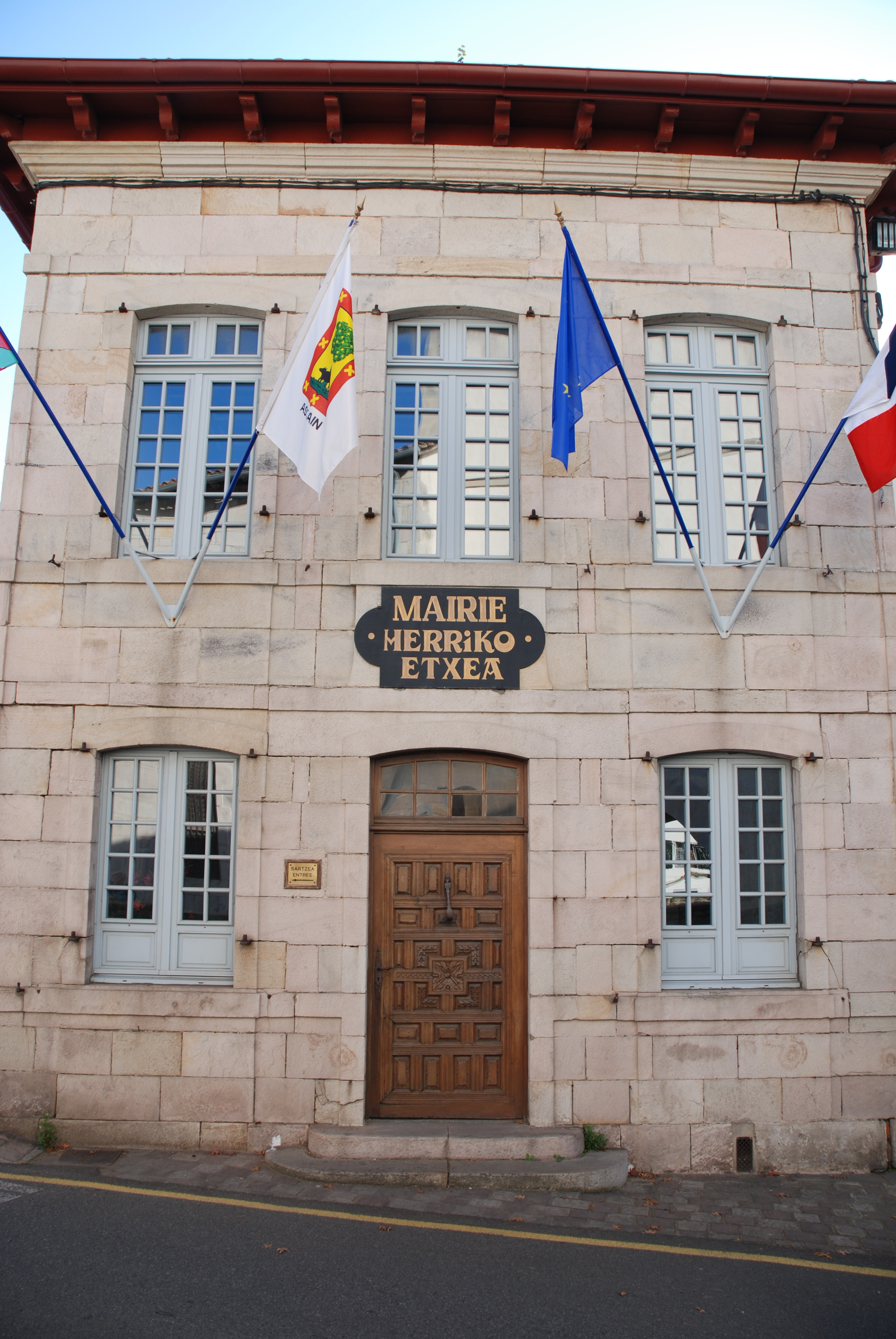
Ascain Town Hall

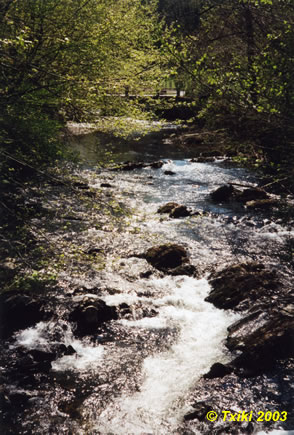
The Nivelle at Ascain

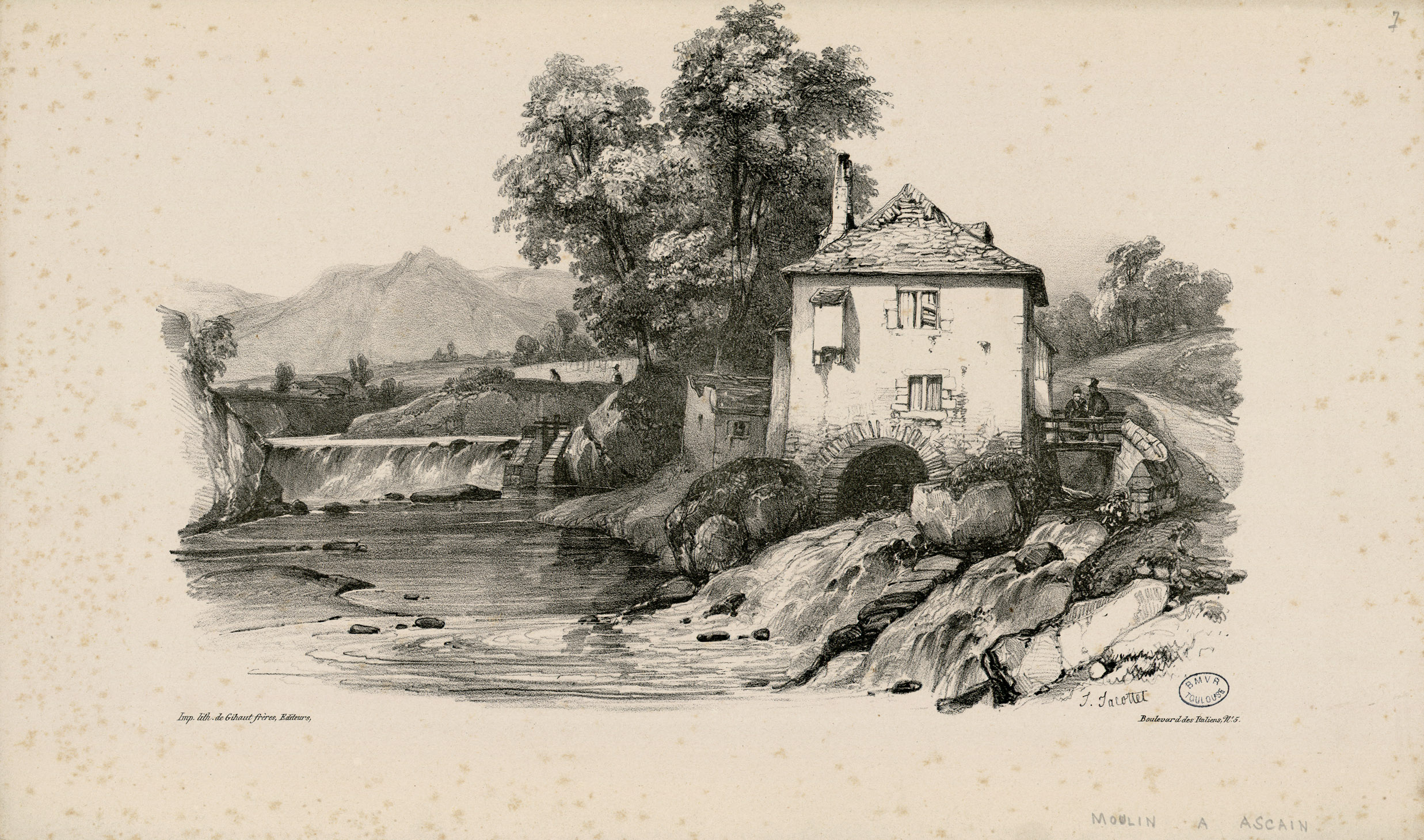
Mill at Ascain 1835-1841

Mayors from 1941

From	To	Name	Party
1941	1945	Jean-Baptiste Gracy	
1945	1946	Charles Minier	
1946	1953	Jean Baptiste Aspirot	
1953	1963	Jean Baptiste Gracy	
1963	1971	Robert Minier	
1971	1977	Jean Sauvé	
1977	2001	André Luberriaga	DVD
2001	2014	Jean-Louis Laduche	DVD
2014	2026	Jean-Louis Fournier	

=== Inter-communality ===
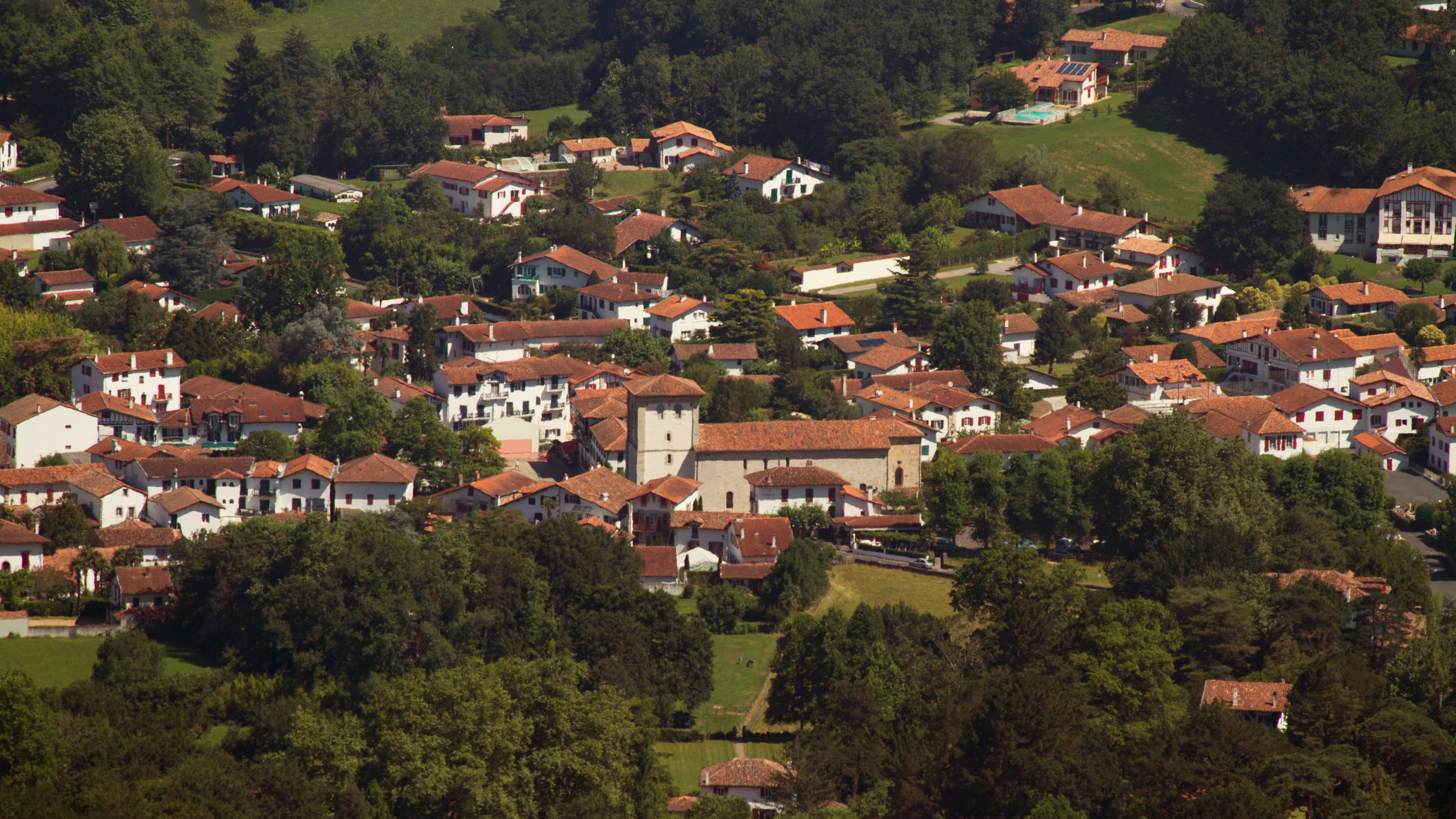
Ascain from Larrun

The commune is part of eight inter-communal structures:

- the Communauté d'agglomération du Pays Basque;
- the AEP association of Nive Nivelle;
- the Energy association of Pyrénées-Atlantiques;
- the inter-communal association for secondary educational colleges of Saint-Jean-de-Luz;
- the inter-communal association for the rescue centre in Saint-Jean-de-Luz;
- the SIED Côte Basque Sud;
- the association to support Basque culture.
- the Basque Bayonne - San Sebastián Eurocity.

=== Twinning ===
Ascain has twinning associations with:

- Bollendorf (Germany) since 1979.
- Lesaka (Spain) since 1980.

== Demography ==
In 1670 the commune had 300 fires and in 1718 1,560 inhabitants.

The inhabitants of the commune are known as Azkaindar.

Historical population

Year	Pop.	±% p.a.
1793	688	—
1800	766	+1.55%
1806	820	+1.14%
1821	833	+0.10%
1831	1,014	+1.99%
1836	1,041	+0.53%
1841	1,132	+1.69%
1846	1,297	+2.76%
1851	1,272	−0.39%
1856	1,113	−2.64%
1861	1,162	+0.87%
1866	1,116	−0.80%
1872	1,171	+0.81%
1876	1,173	+0.04%
1881	1,212	+0.66%
1886	1,225	+0.21%
1891	1,150	−1.26%
1896	1,128	−0.39%
1901	1,157	+0.51%

Year	Pop.	±% p.a.
1906	1,178	+0.36%
1911	1,240	+1.03%
1921	1,216	−0.20%
1926	1,354	+2.17%
1931	1,510	+2.20%
1936	1,460	−0.67%
1946	1,376	−0.59%
1954	1,474	+0.86%
1962	1,605	+1.07%
1968	1,683	+0.79%
1975	1,876	+1.56%
1982	2,159	+2.03%
1990	2,653	+2.61%
1999	3,097	+1.73%
2007	3,669	+2.14%
2012	4,156	+2.52%
2017	4,194	+0.18%
2023	4,658	+1.76%

Source: EHESS and INSEE

== Economy ==
Economic activity is mainly agricultural and also tourism. There is a sandstone quarry in the commune.

Ascain is part of the Appellation d'origine contrôlée (AOC) zone of Ossau-iraty.

There are two breweries (Akerbeltz and Oldarki) in the commune.

== Culture and heritage ==
According to the Map of the Seven Basque Provinces edited in 1863 by Prince Louis-Lucien Bonaparte, the basque dialect spoken in Ascain is Labourdin.

The film La Danseuse Orchidée by Léonce Perret was partly filmed in Ascain in 1928 with Chiquito de Cambo.

=== Civil heritage ===
There are several buildings and structures in Ascain that are registered as historical monuments. These are:

- House of Ferdinand Pinney Earle (20th century)
- Redoubt of Biscarzoun (partly in Saint-Pée-sur-Nivelle) (19th century)
- Redoubt of Esnaur (1813)
- Roman bridge on the Nivelle (5th century). It was rebuilt after the collapse of the central pier caused by flooding of the Nivelle in December 1994.
- Group of nine Stone circles at Aïra-Harri (Protohistoric)

The two redoubts were part of the defence by Marshal Soult of the Franco-Spanish border against the British Army under Wellington in 1813.

In 1947 the village erected the first Stèle des évadés de France (Stele of escapees of France) in memory of the resistance fighters who left France to join the Free French Forces via Spain during the Second World War.

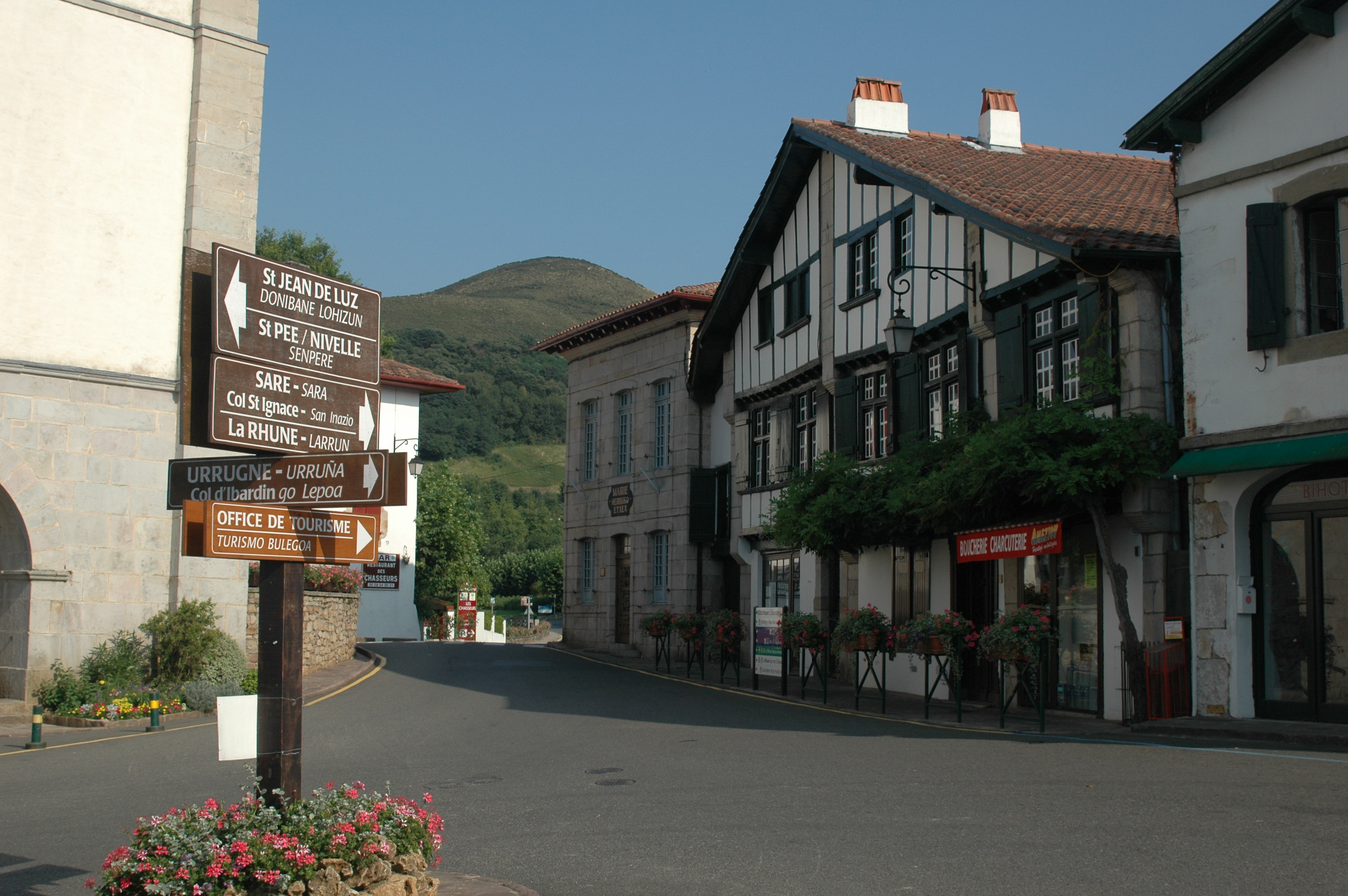
Bilingual signs

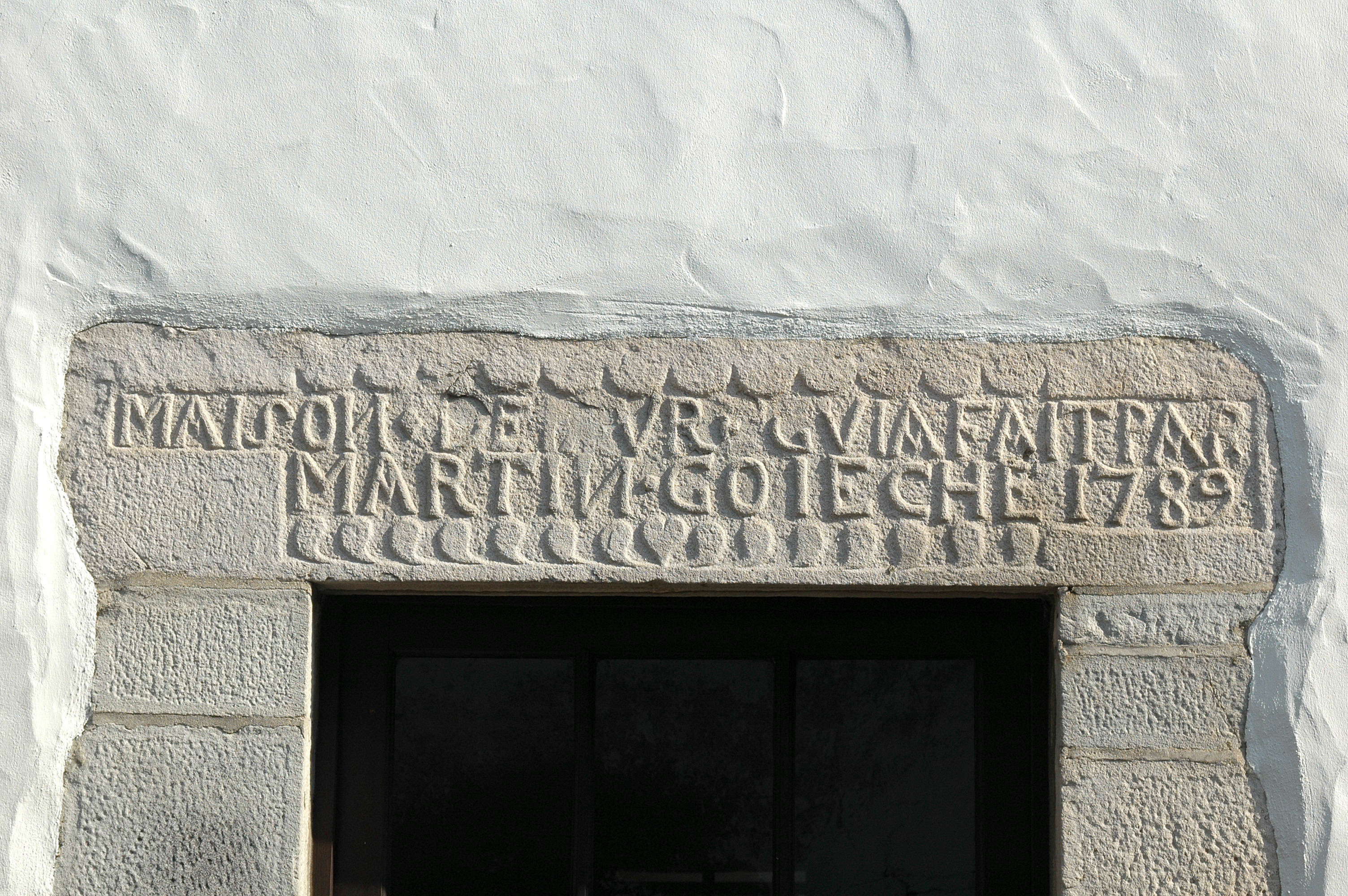
Lintel on a House

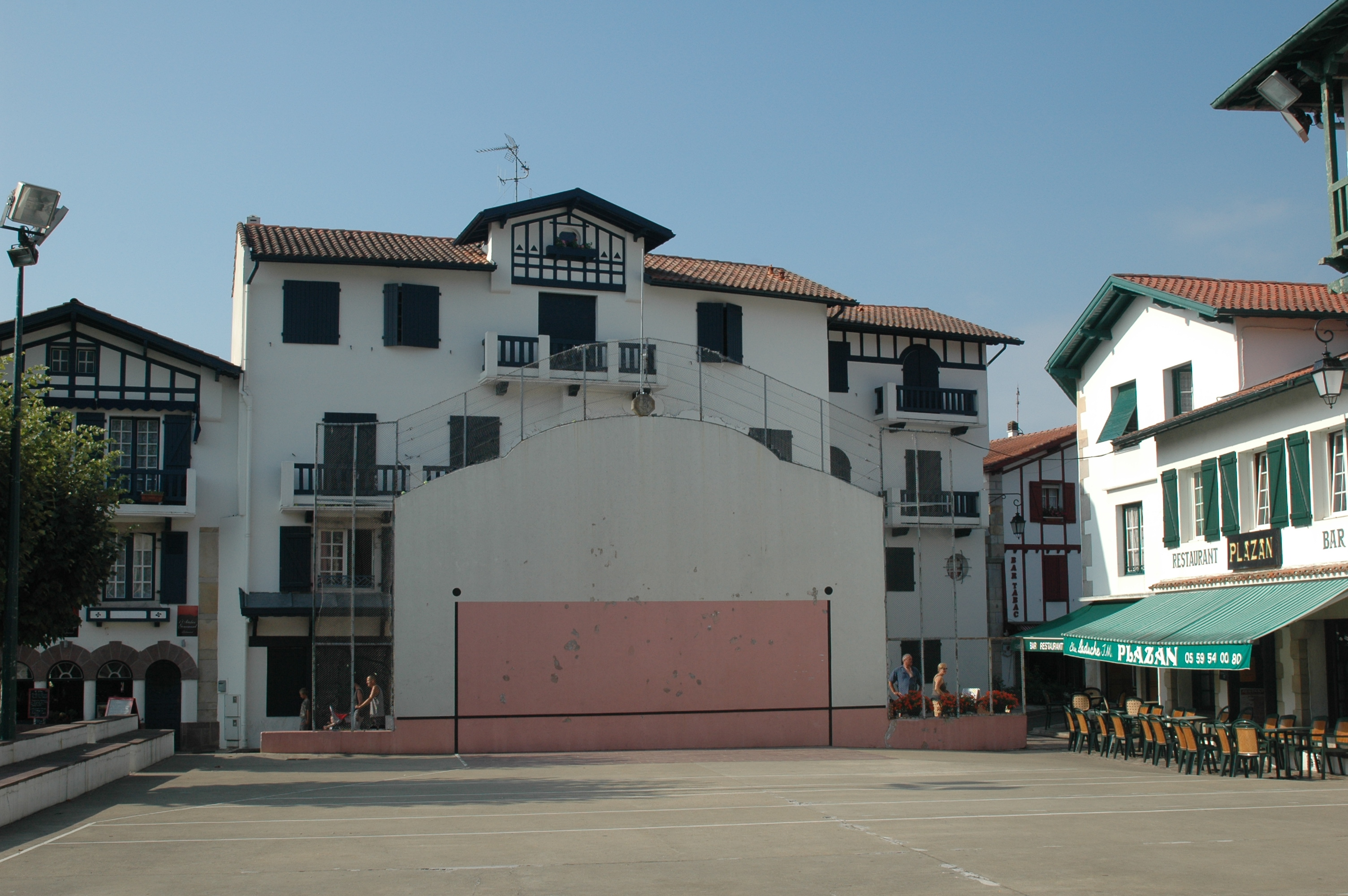
The fronton in the square

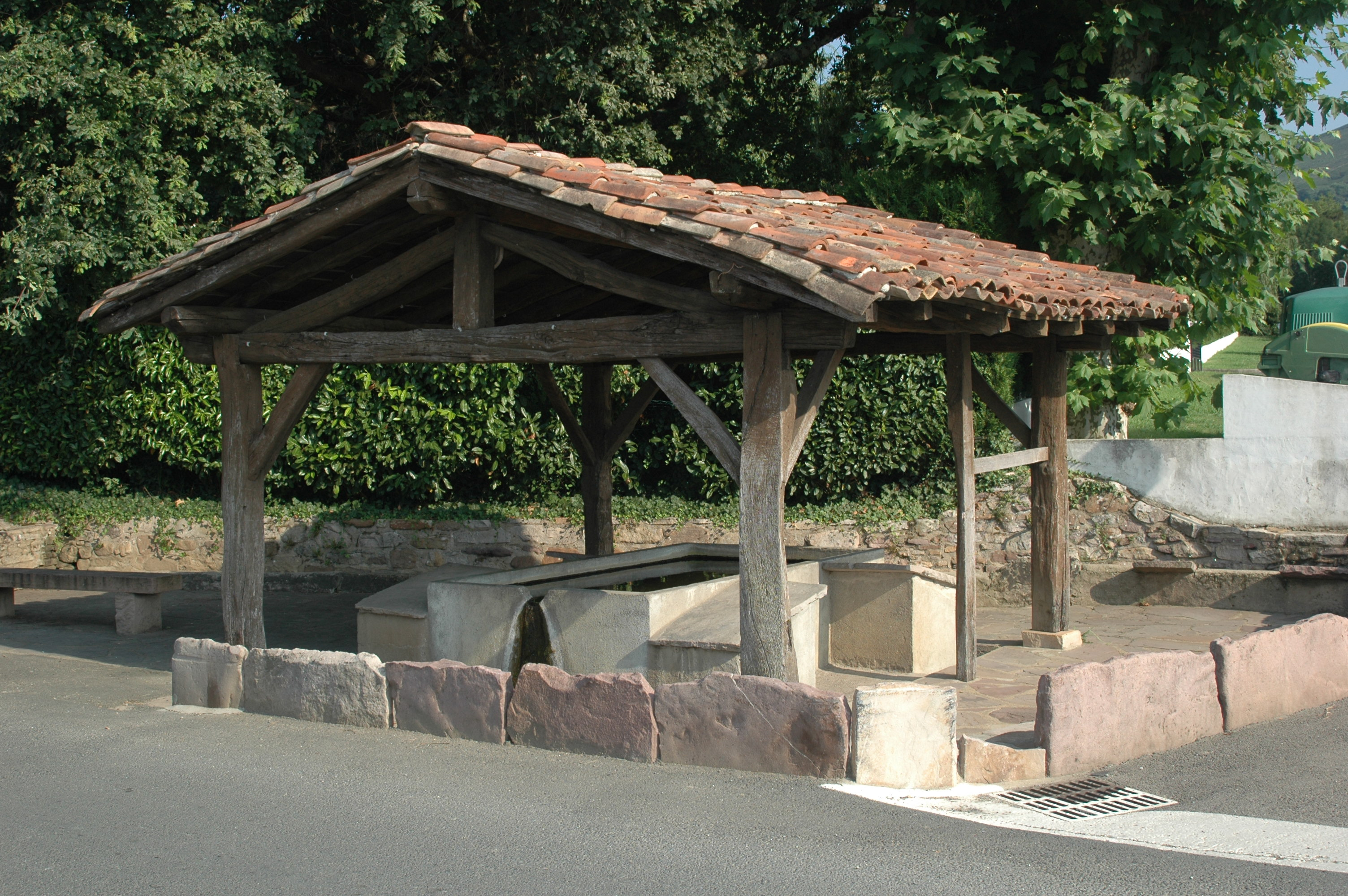
The Lavoir (public laundry)

=== Religious heritage ===
The Church of the Assumption has some medieval remains. It was enlarged in the 16th and 17th centuries and was inaugurated under Louis XIII in 1626. In 1605 Monseigneur Bertrand d'Etchaux, Bishop of Bayonne, visited the parish of Ascain and permitted "the said parishioners of the said parish to sell or dispose of the tombs that seem good in favour of the proceeds of the sale"... (be used for) ..."the keeping, repair, and completion of the work on the church".

Inside the church is a Statue of the Virgin and Child which is a cast of a statue from the 14th century: the original in marble, called the Virgin of Longchamp, is preserved in the Musée national du Moyen Âge (National Museum of the Middle Ages) in Paris. Tombstones in pink sandstone from Larrun cover the grounds.

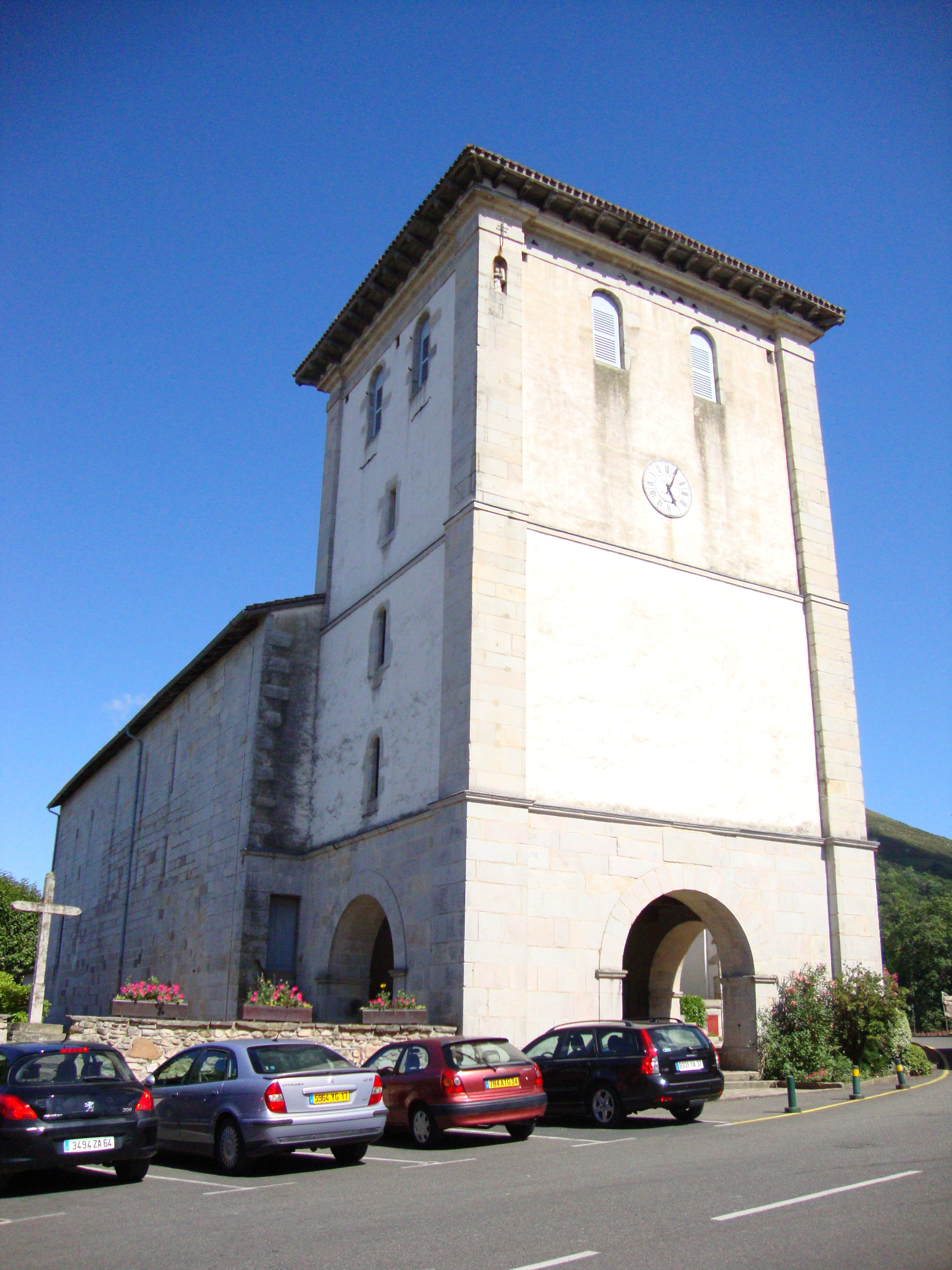
Church of the Assumption at Ascain

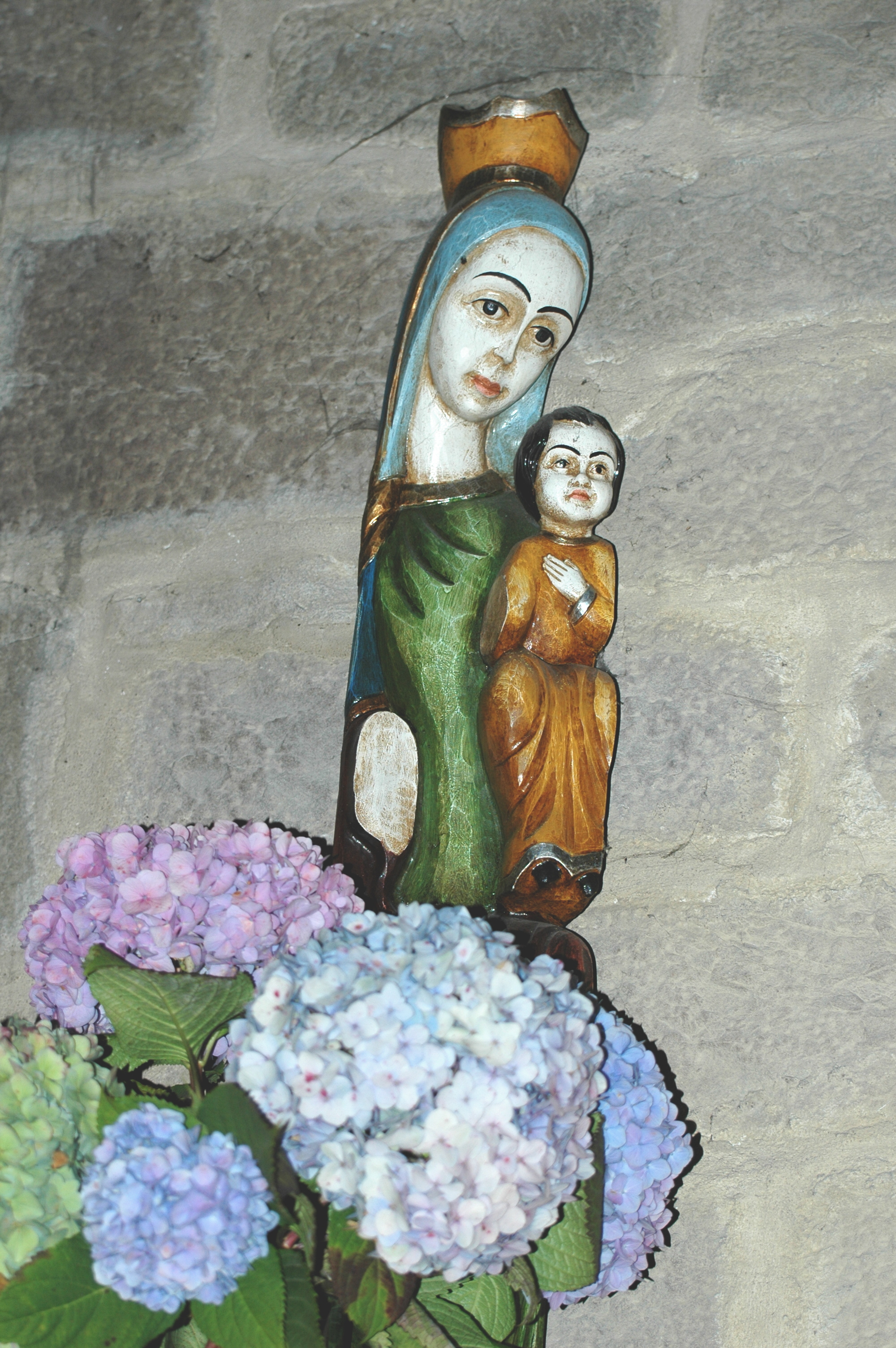
Modern Virgin

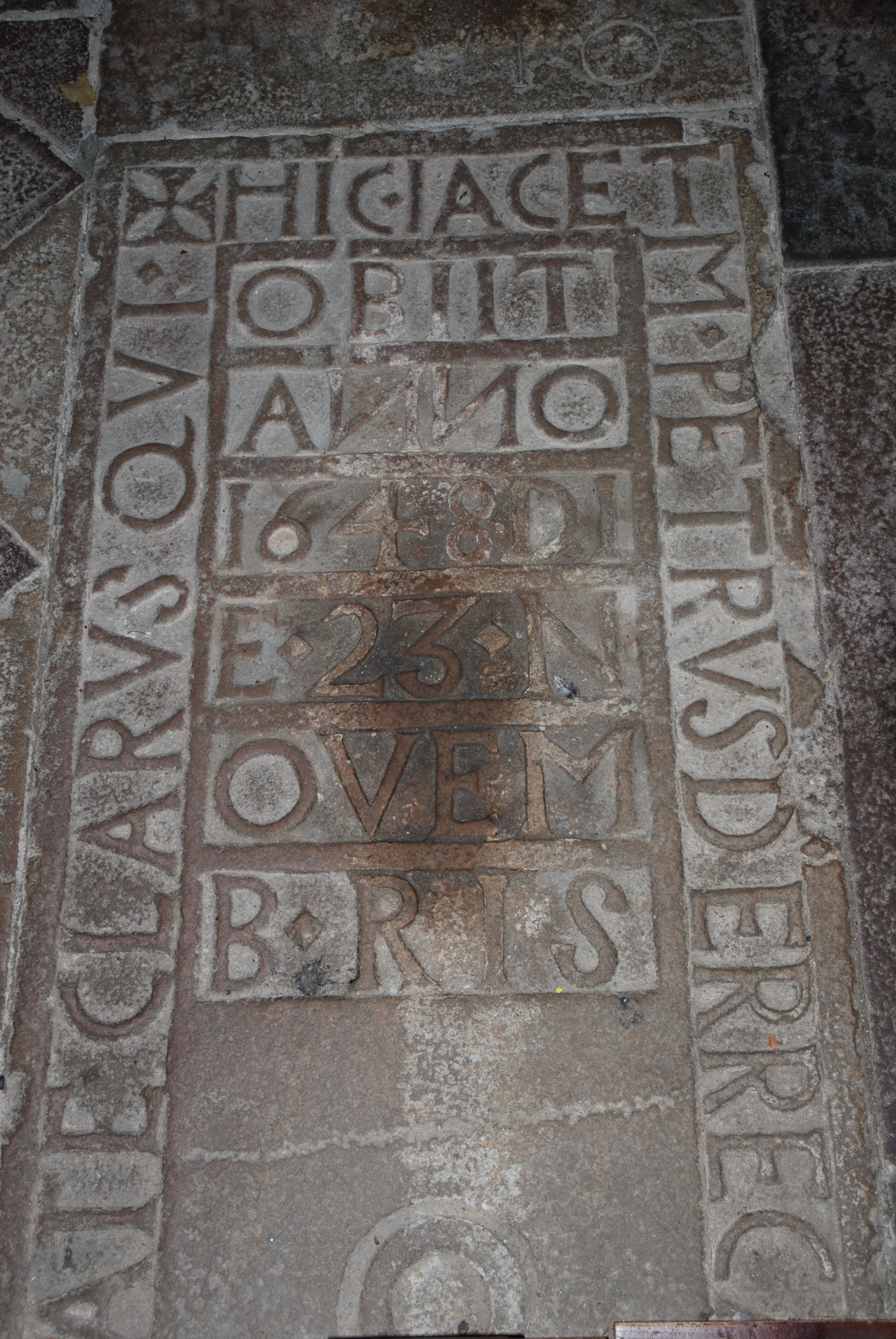
Plaque in pink sandstone from Larrun dating to 1648

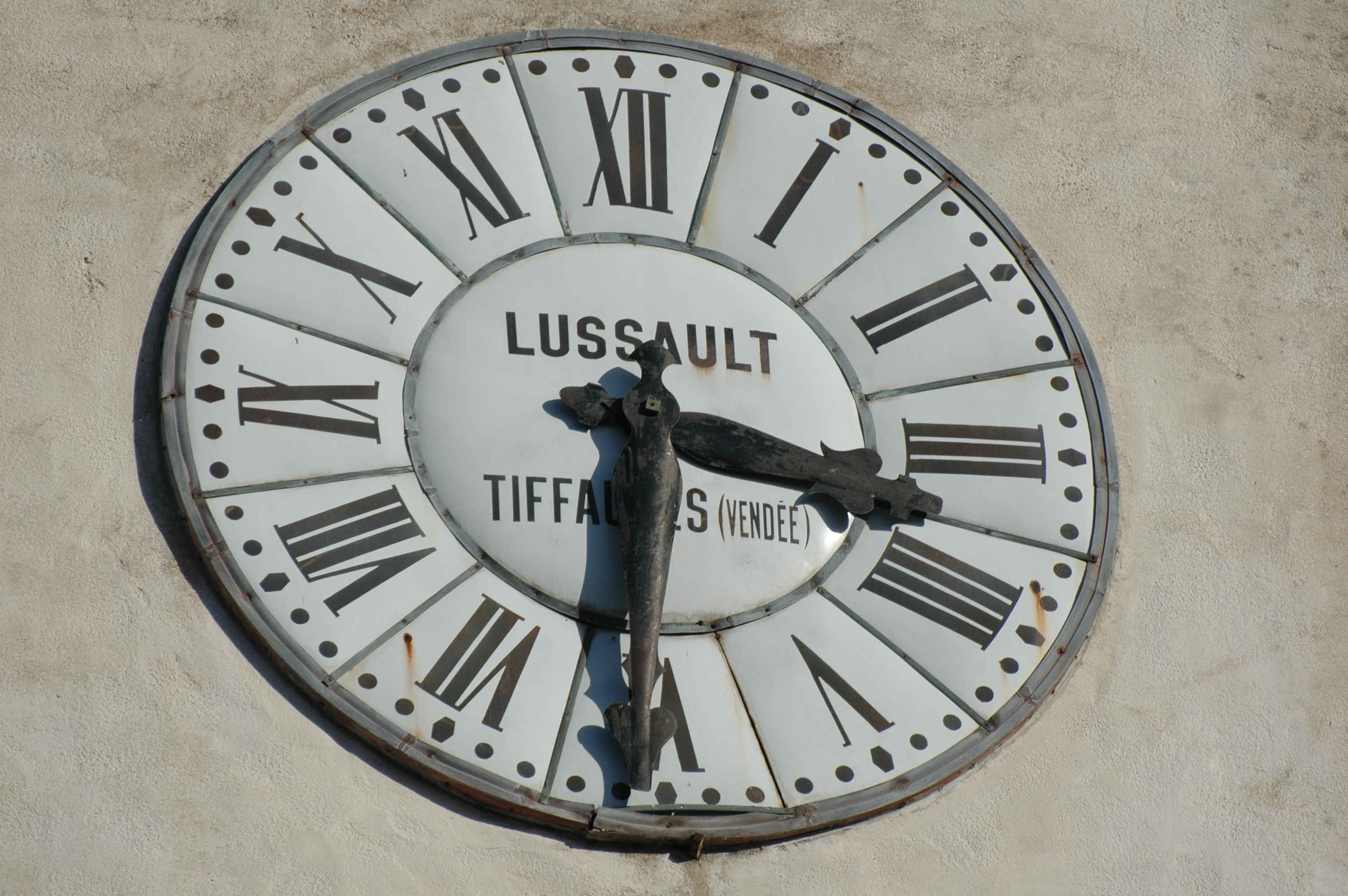
Clock on the church

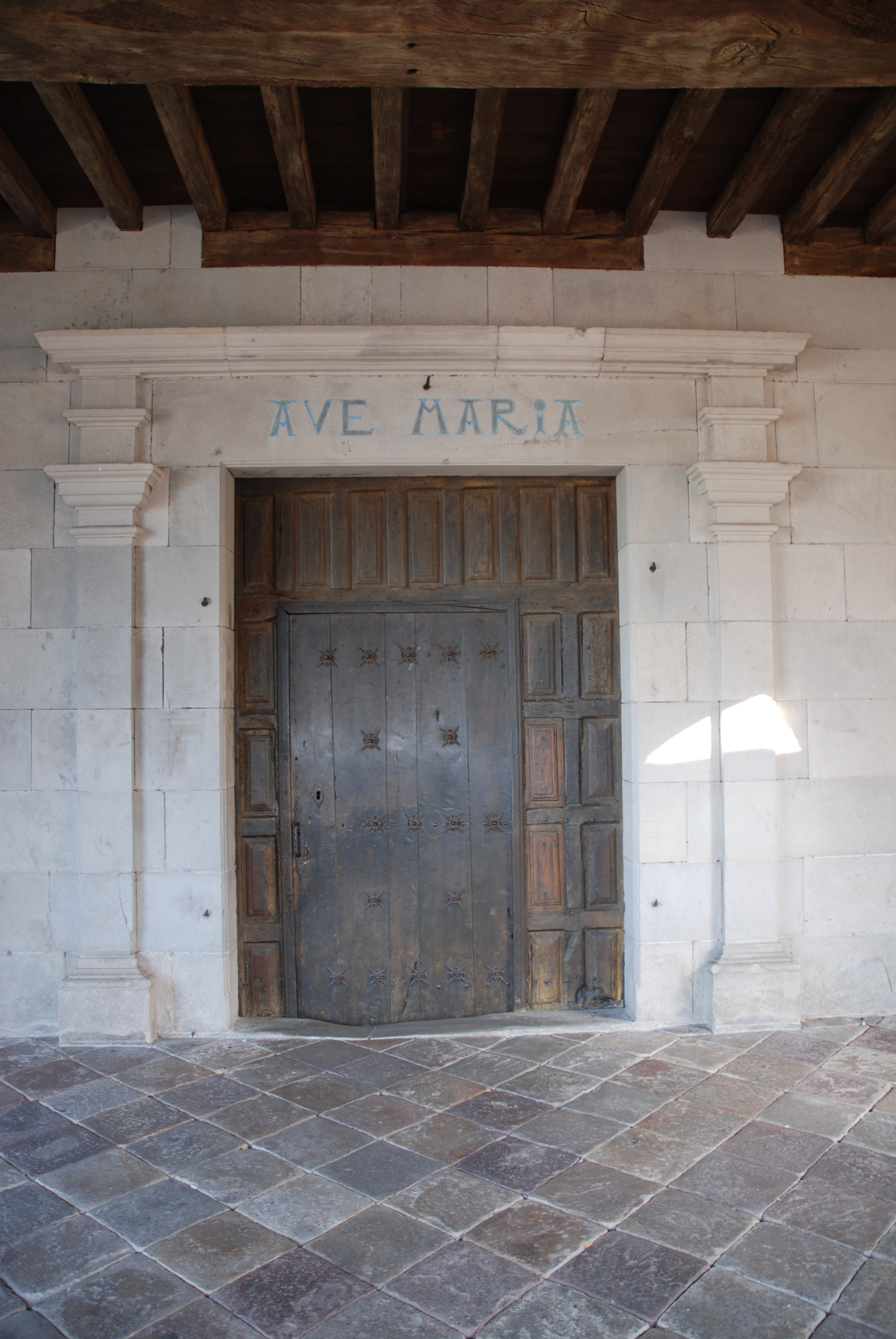
Church entrance

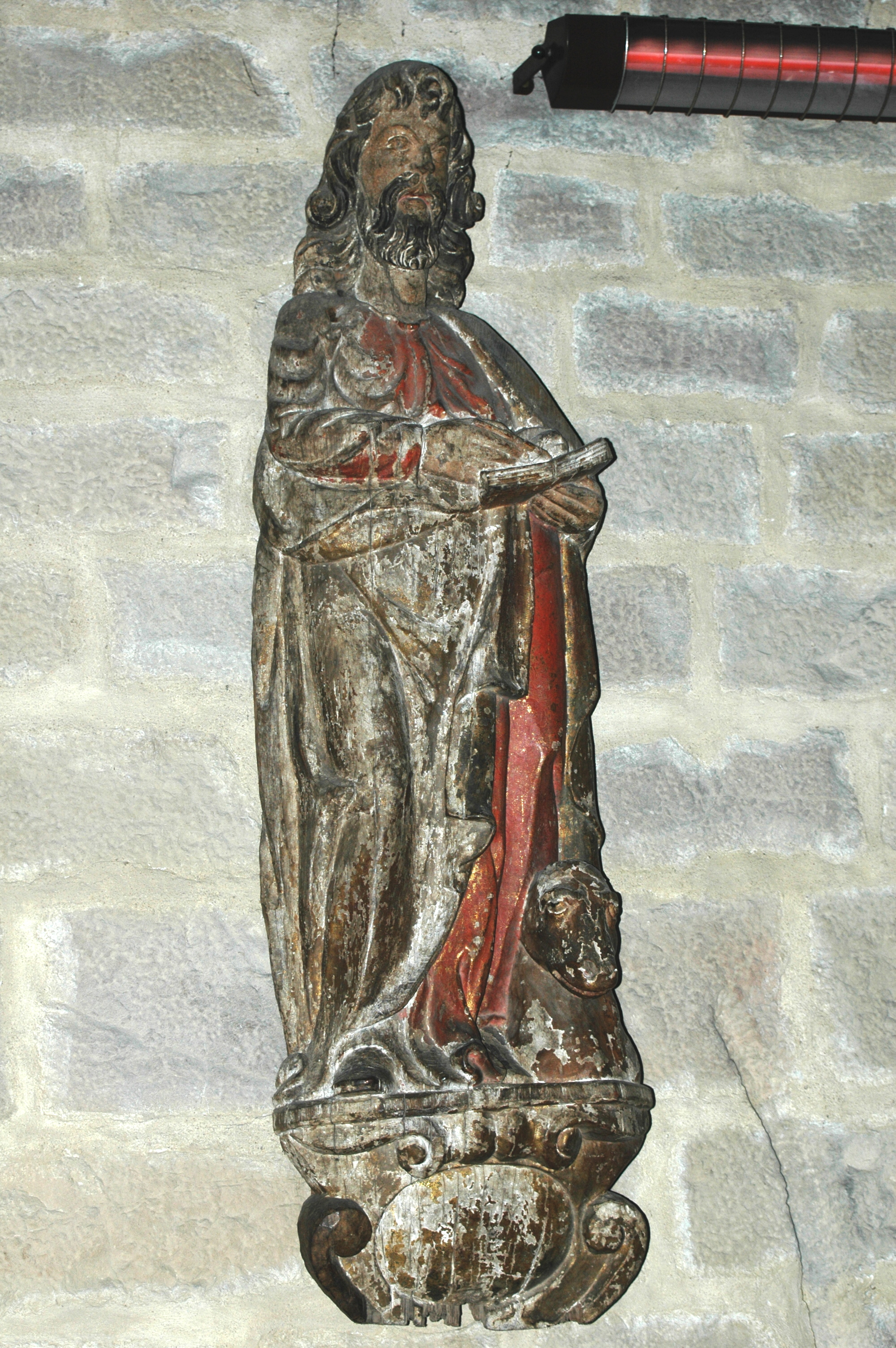
Statue

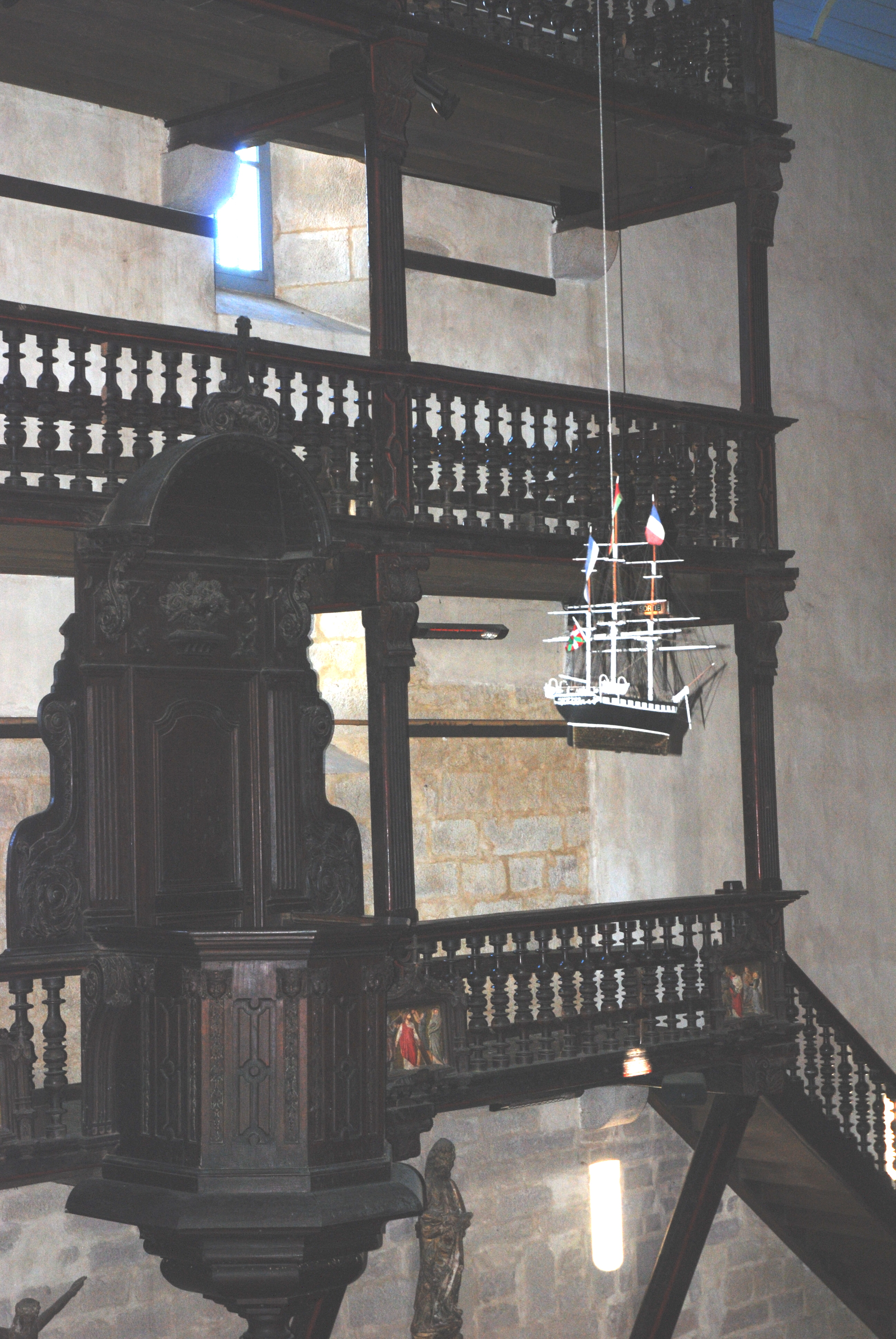
Pulpit and gallery

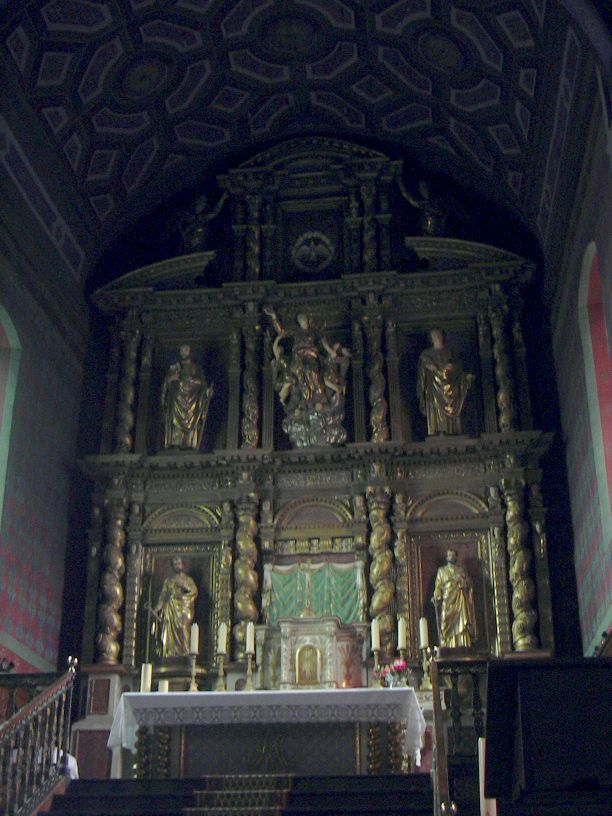
The Altar

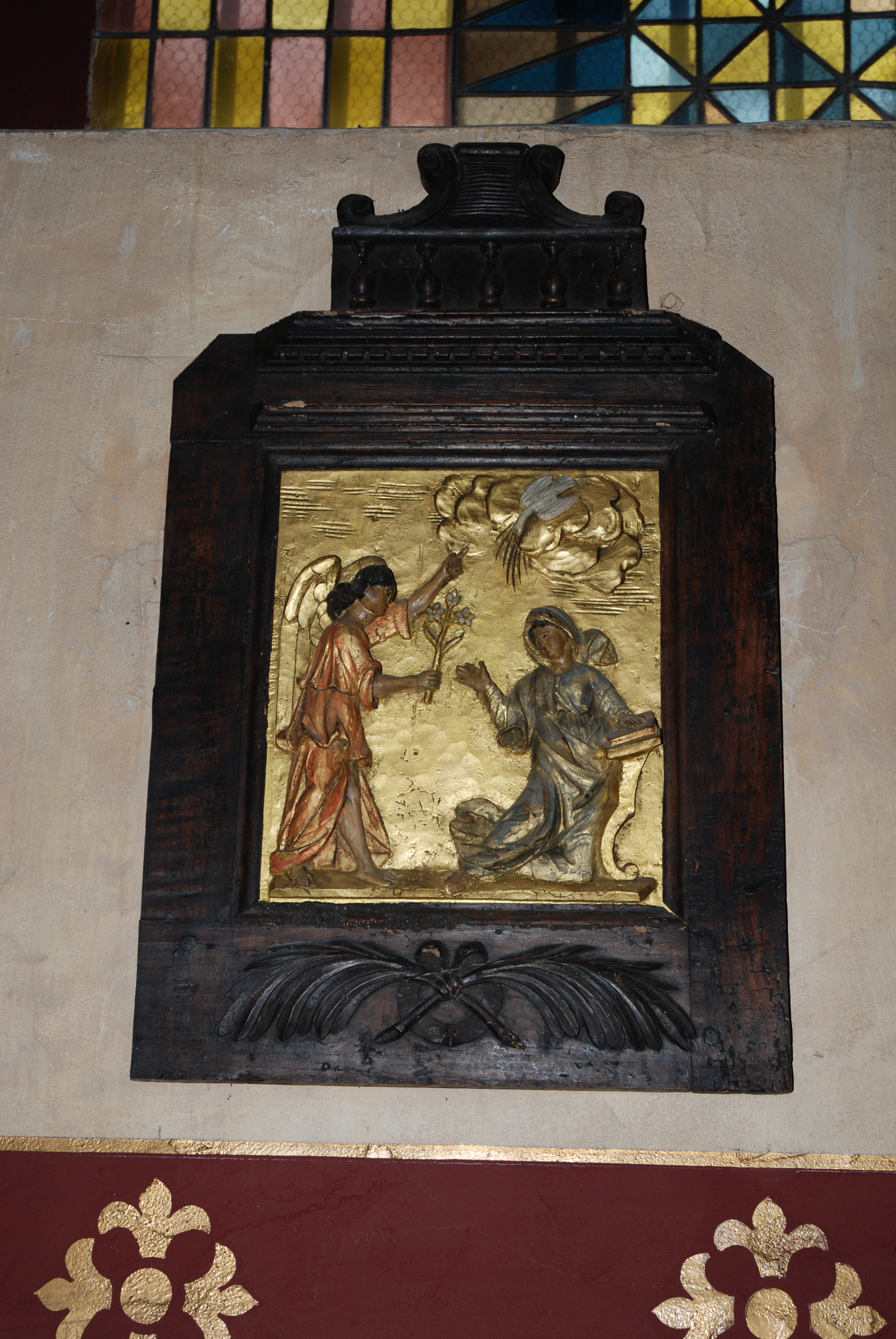
Bas-relief

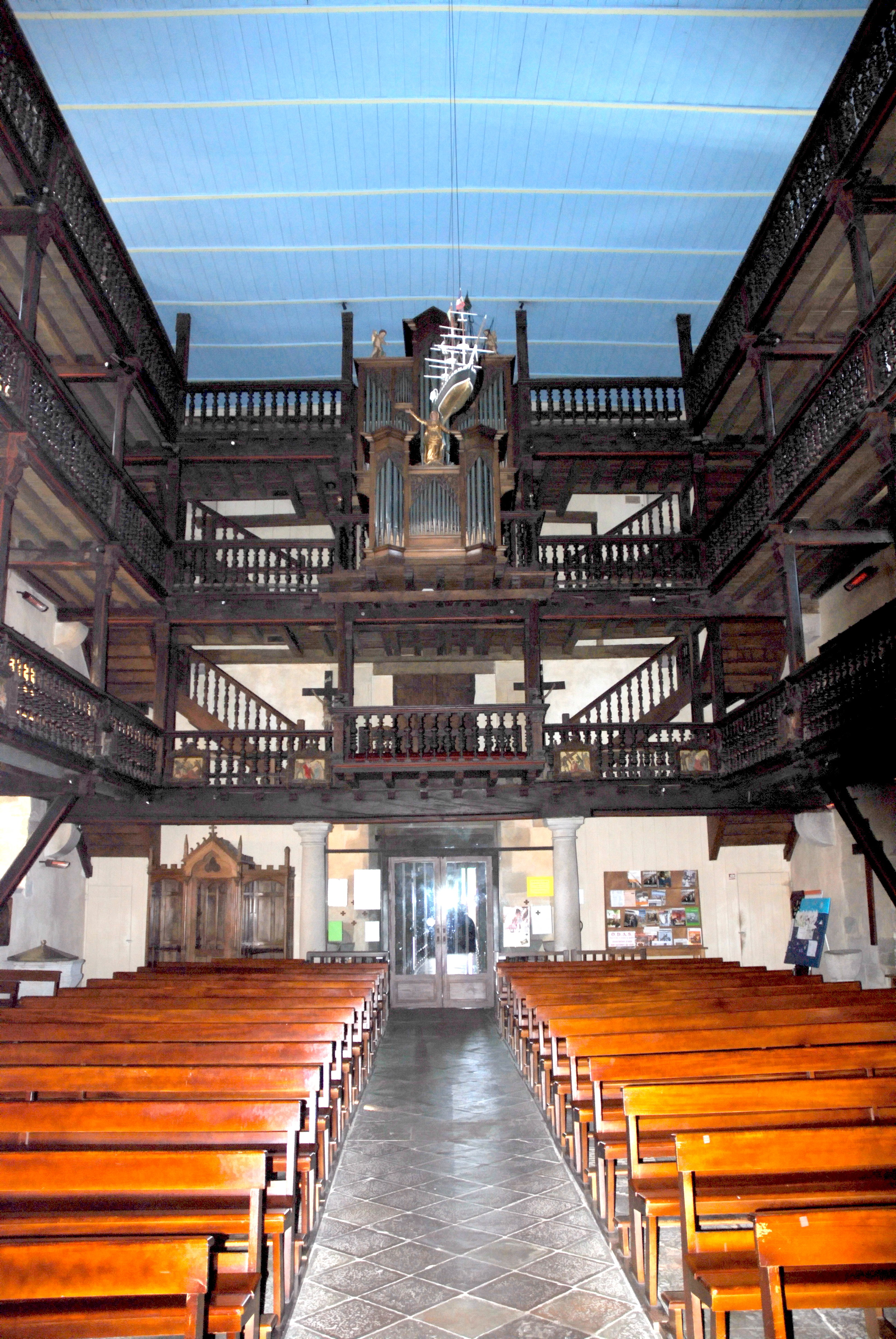
The Nave

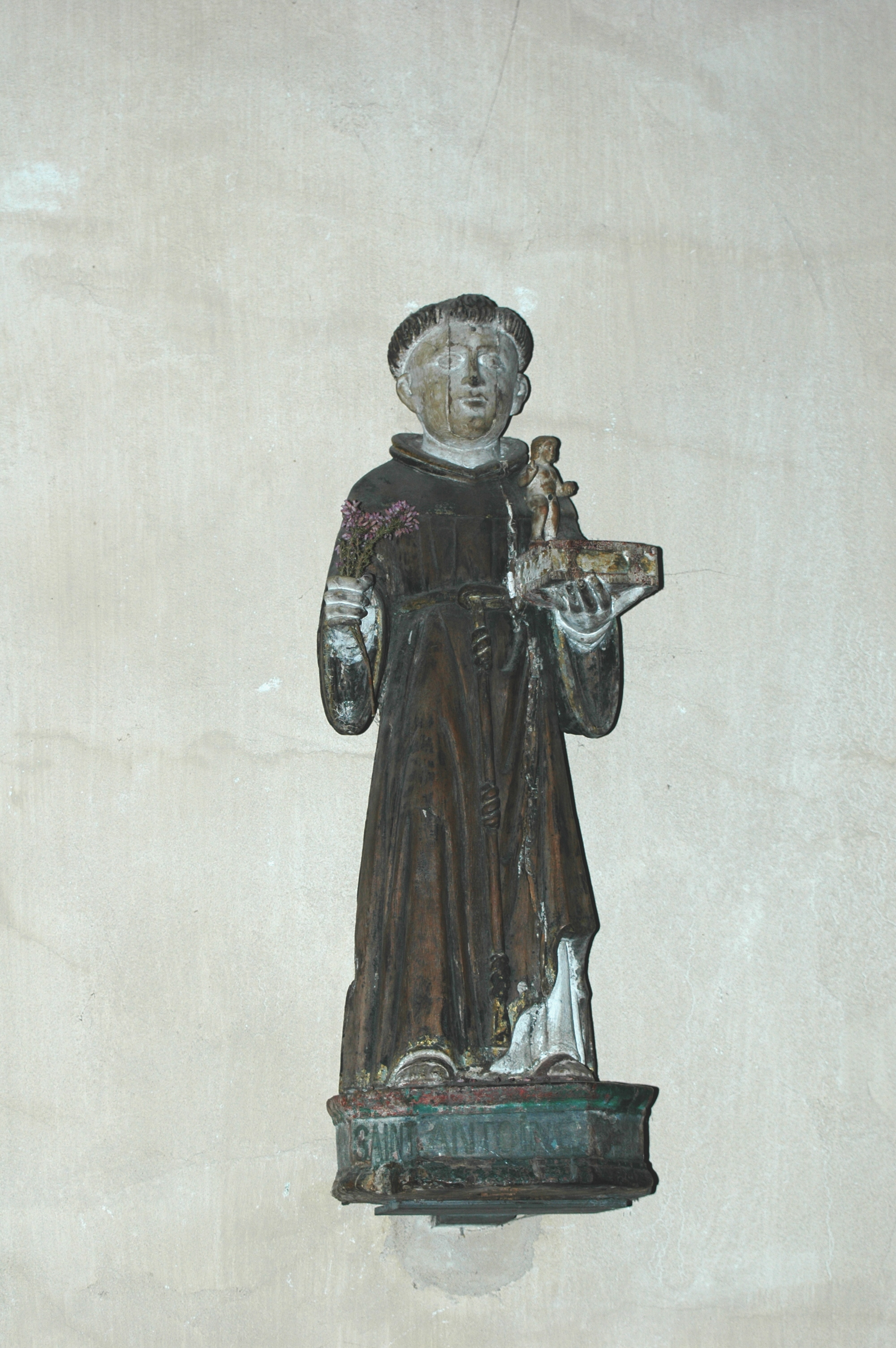
Statue of Saint Antoine

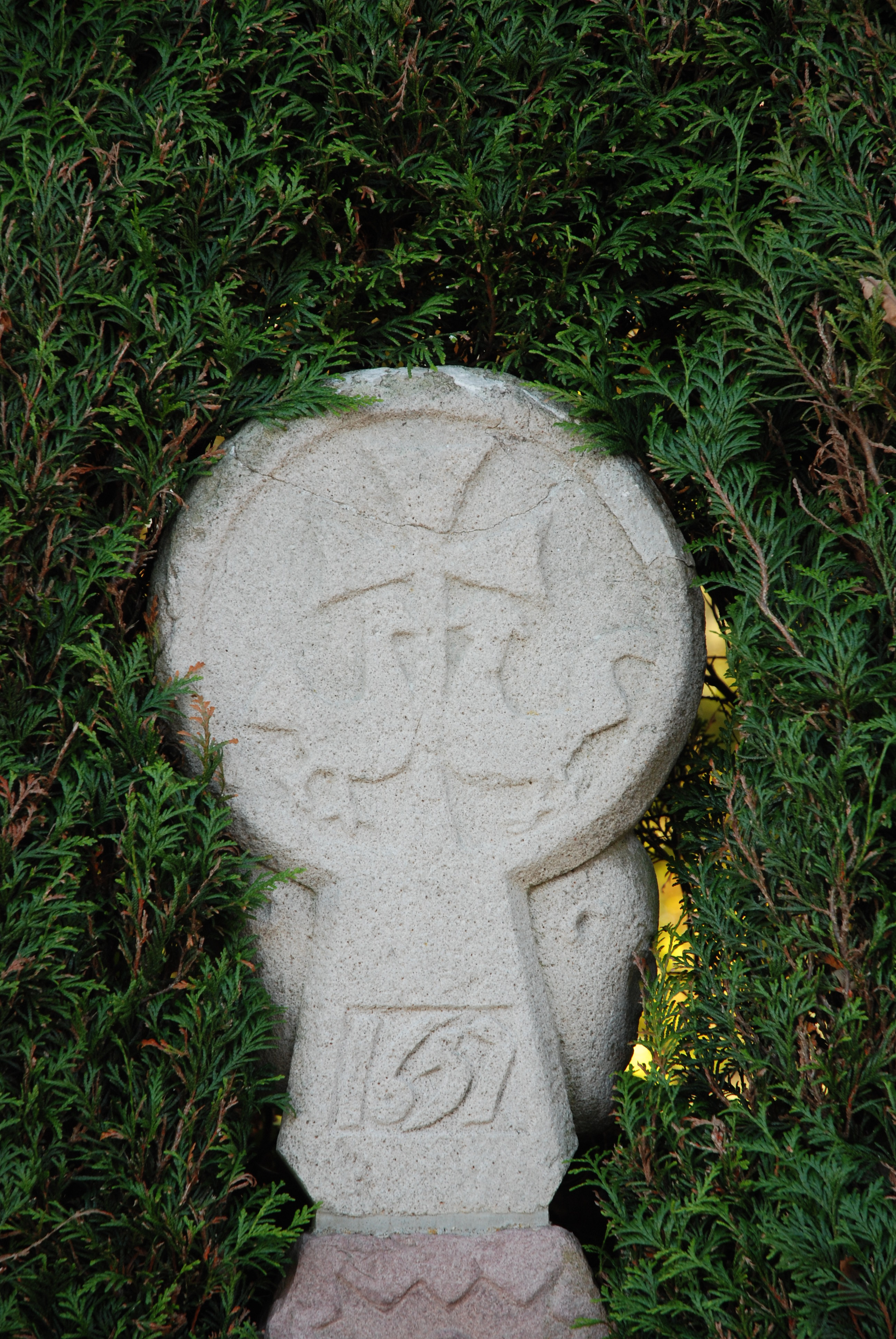
Hilarri

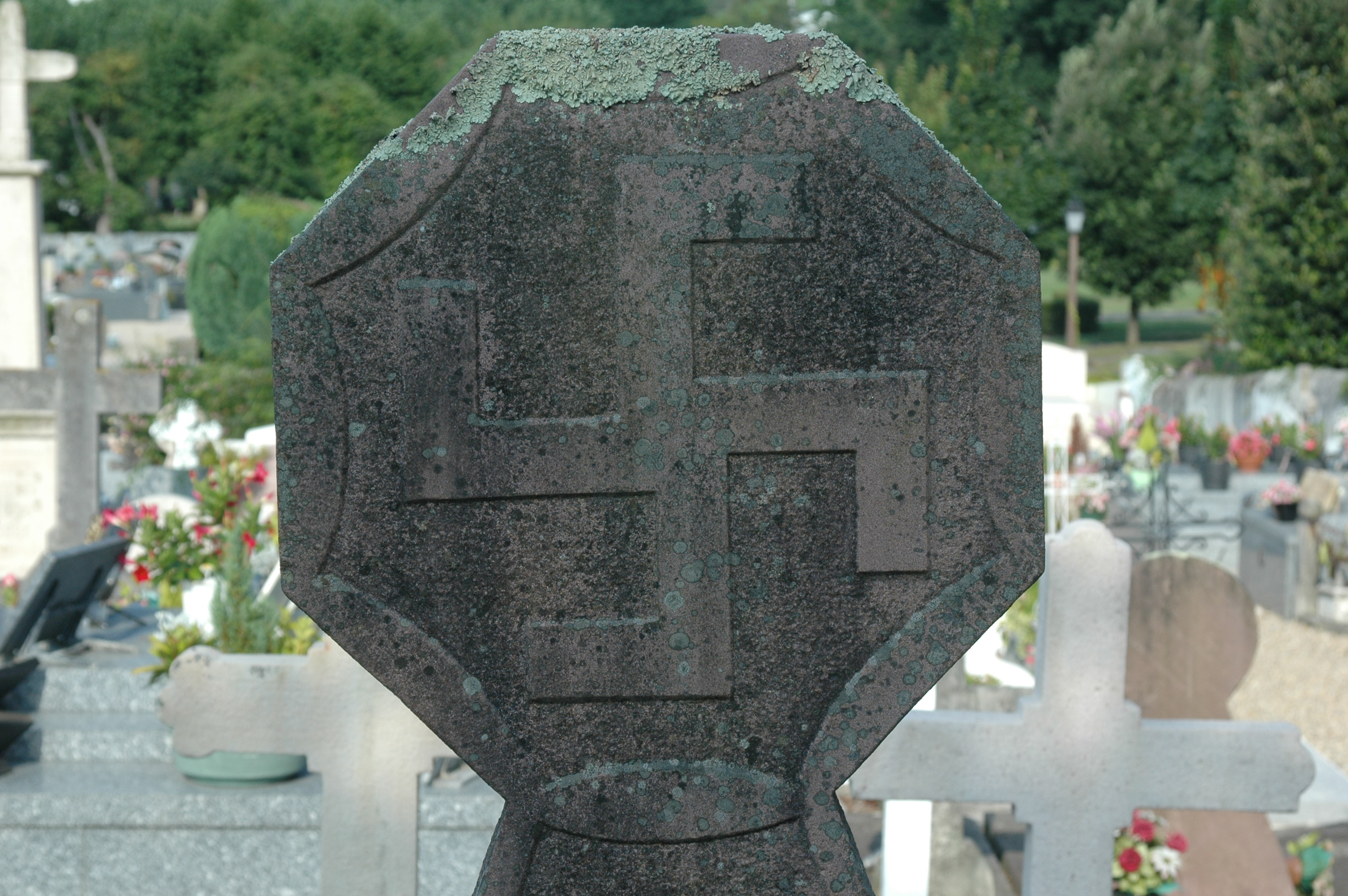
Swastika Hilarri

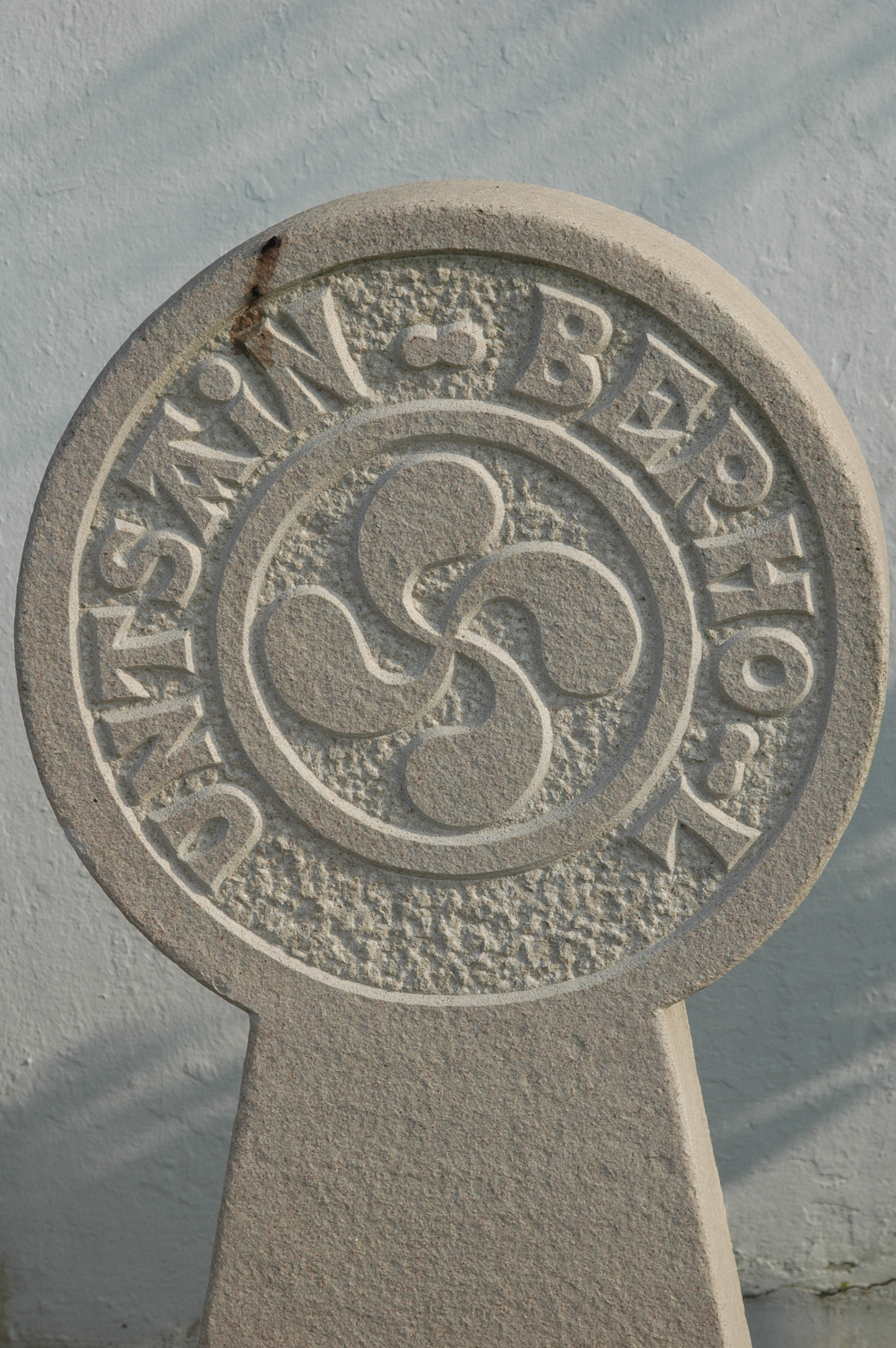
Hilarri

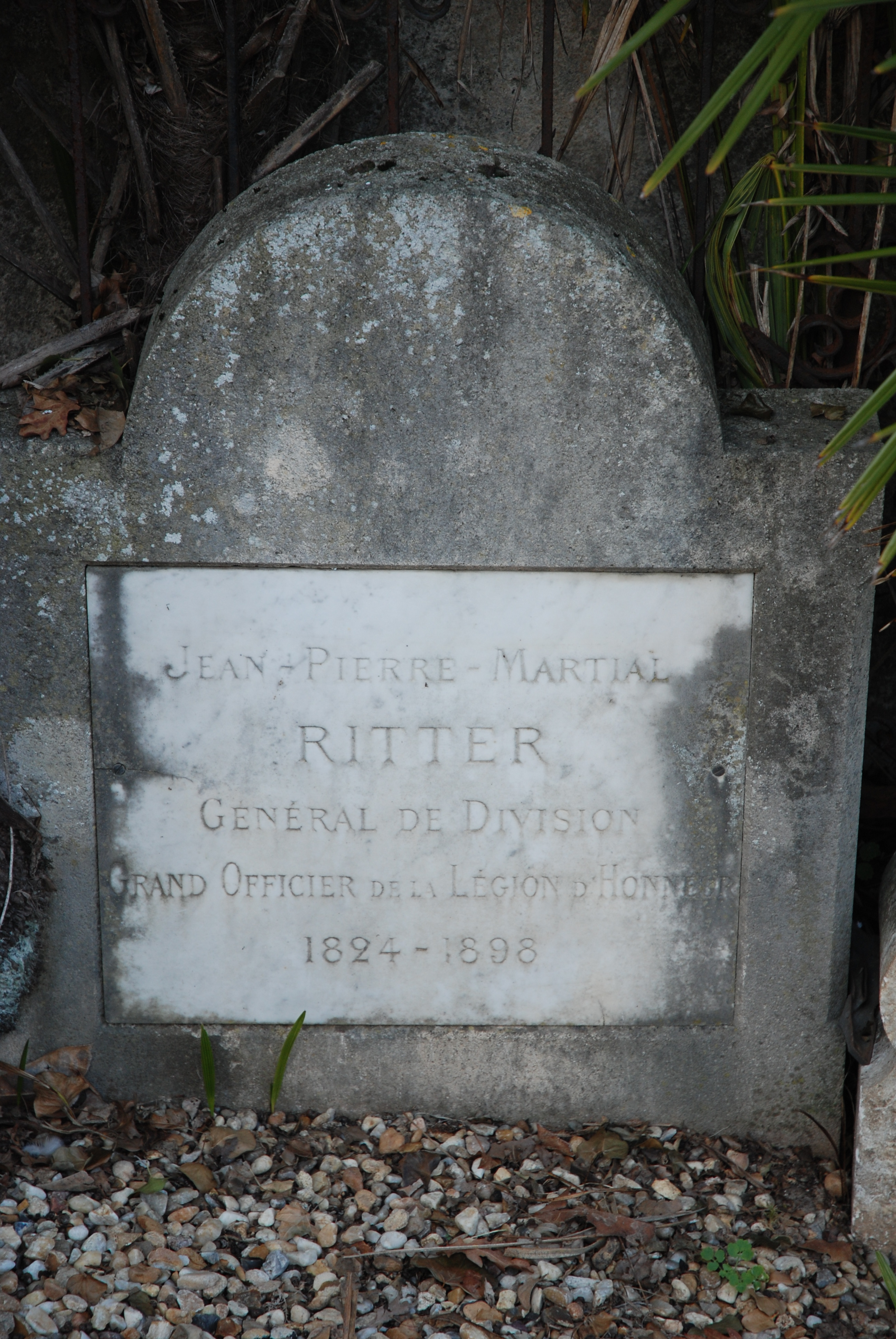
Stele of General Jean-Pierre Ritter

The Chapel of Serres, dedicated to Saint Jacques and recently restored was, in the Middle Ages, a waystation on the Way of St. James.

== Facilities ==
=== Education ===
The commune has three primary schools: one public, one private catholic (Sainte-Marie school), and one Ikastola (Basque language school).

A Music school (Kornelio), in the form of an association offers classic and traditional training.

The Larrundarrak drum band, the Larrun Kanta choir, and the Martintxo-Altxalili association complete the musical offerings of the commune.

=== Sports and sports facilities ===
There are several sports associations in the commune including associations for athletics, basketball, cycling, traditional dance, gymnastics, basque pelota, hiking, rugby union, and tennis.

== Notable people linked to the commune ==
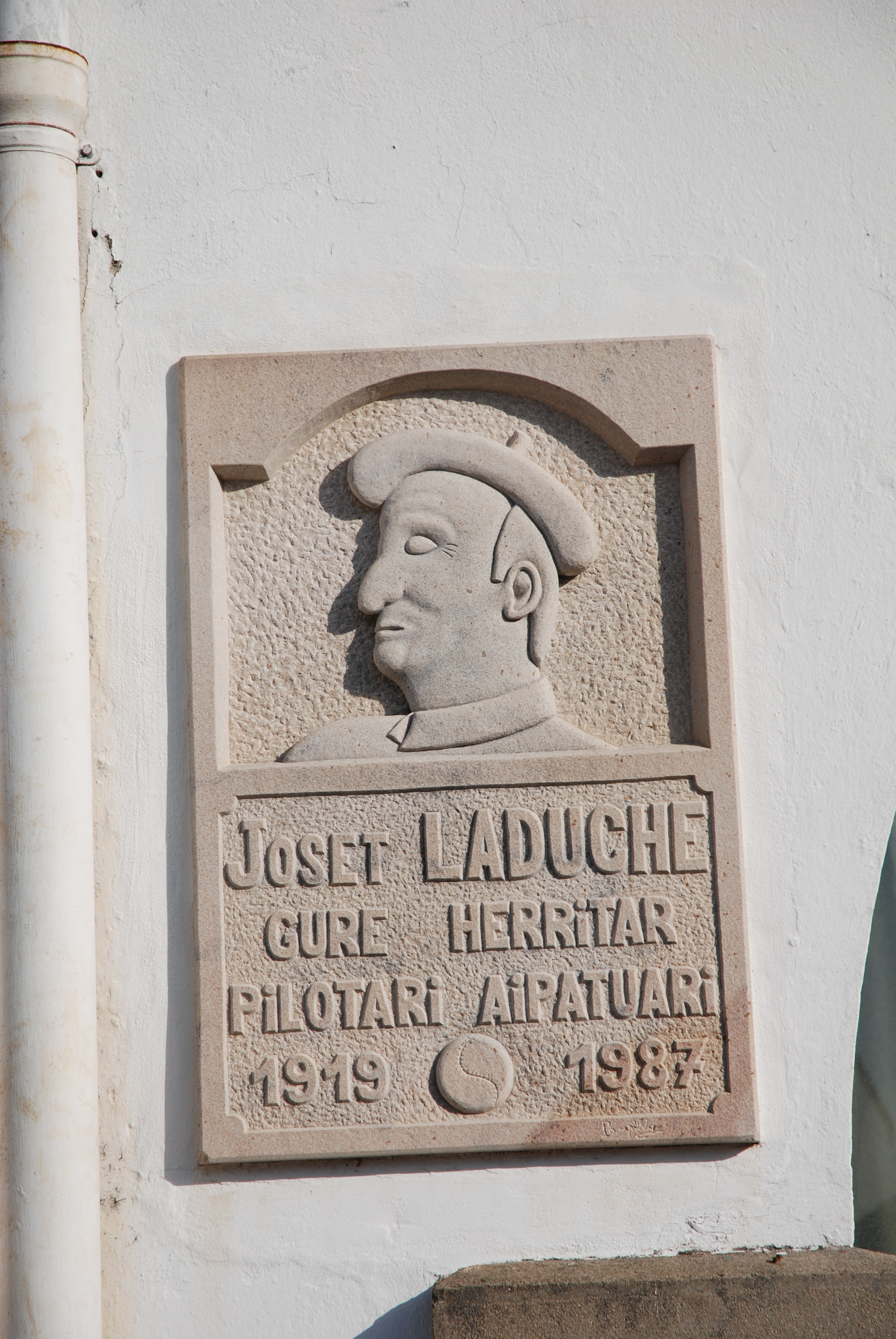
Commemorative plaque for Joseph Ladouche

- Johannes de Sossiondo, born at Ascain, Bishop of Bayonne from 1566 to 1578;
- Edmé-Martin Vandermaesen, born in 1766 at Versailles and died in 1813 at Ascain, was a Divisional general, mortally wounded at Saint-Jean-de-Luz;
- Nicolas François Conroux, born in 1770 at Douai (Nord) and died in 1813 at St Esprit), was a French General, Baron of Pépinville, mortally wounded at Ascain;
- Jean Hirigoyen Larroque, born at Ascain in 1788, father of Martin Hirigoyen Dolagaray (1821-1888) who emigrated to Argentina and was the father of Hipólito Yrigoyen Alem, twice president of Argentina.
- José Revilla Haya, born at Madrid of a basque family in 1864 and died at Ascain in 1955, Mining engineer and geologist.
- Jean-Pierre Borda, called Otharré, born at Ascain in 1866 and died in 1922, was a basque pelota player in rebot and bare hands. Friend of Pierre Loti, he was inspired by one of the characters in the novel Ramuntcho, which was written at the Hotel de la Rhune.
- Ernest Fourneau, born at Biarritz in 1872, died at Ascain in 1949, was the founder of French Medicinal chemistry.
- Ferdinand Pinney Earle (1878-1951) was a famous Hollywood cinema decorator in the 1910s and 1920s. In 1930 he moved to Ascain and built a house shaped like a revolver reminiscent of adobe houses built in Santa Fe around 1920.
- Jean Élissalde, born at Ascain in 1883 and died at Gréciette in 1961, was a writer, Catholic priest, poet, and basque academic.
- Prince Feodor Alexandrovich of Russia, born on 23 December 1898 at Saint-Petersburg (Russia), and died on 30 November 1968 at Ascain. He was buried in the cemetery at Urrugne.
- Marie-Louise Osorio, from Ascain, was a bertsolari, famous for her duet with Pierre Ibarrart in 1869.
- Maurice Abeberry born at Biarritz in 1926 and died at Ascain in 1988, was a doctor of law, lawyer, sports administrator, and music-lover;
- Léon Berho born on 4 June 1932 at Ascain and died at Dax in October 2011, was a rugby union player, finalist in the championship of France in 1961, 1963, and 1966 with US Dax;
- Jacques Chaban-Delmas, born in 1915 at Paris and died in 2000 at Paris, was Mayor of Bordeaux, Prime Minister, Honorary President of the National Assembly, General of the Resistance, buried in the cemetery at Ascain where he had a second home.

== See also ==
- Communes of the Pyrénées-Atlantiques department
- End of Basque home rule in France
