= Petit train de la Rhune =

Metre gauge rack railway in southwestern France

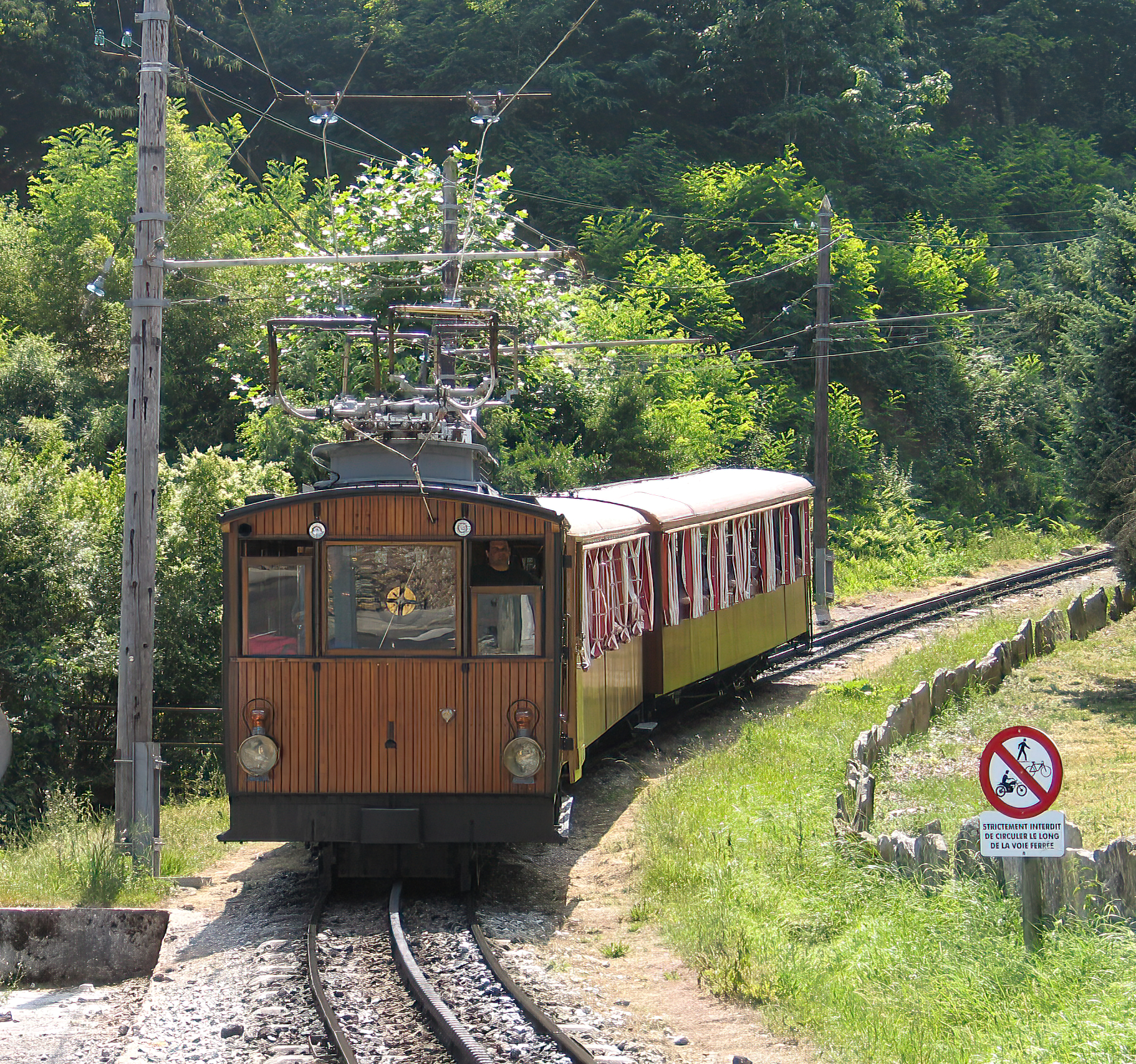
- The Petit train de la Rhune.

Overview
- Other name(s): Chemin de fer de la Rhune, Larrungo tren ttipia
- Stations: Col de Saint-Ignace, La Rhune

Service
- System: Rack & pinion 3 phase electric railway
- Operator: Établissement public des stations d’altitude (EPSA)
- Depot: Col de Saint-Ignace

History
- Opened: 1924

Technical
- Line length: 4.2 km (2.6 mi)
- Number of tracks: Single track with passing loops
- Track gauge: 1,000 mm (3 ft 3 3/8 in)
- Electrification: 3000 V, 50 Hz, three-phase
- Operating speed: 9 km/h (5.6 mph)
- Highest elevation: 905 m (2,969 ft)

The Little Train of Larrun (French: Petit train de la Rhune [pəti tʁɛ̃ də la ʁyn] or Chemin de fer de la Rhune, 'Larrun railway' [ʃəmɛ̃ də fɛʁ-]; Basque: Larrungo tren ttipia) is a metre gauge rack railway in France at the western end of the Pyrenees, in the French Basque Country. It links the Col de Saint-Ignace, some 10 km (6.2 mi) to the east of Saint-Jean-de-Luz, to the summit of the Larrun mountain (French: La Rhune). Although this summit lies on the border between France and Spain, the railway lies entirely within the French département of Pyrénées-Atlantiques.

== History ==
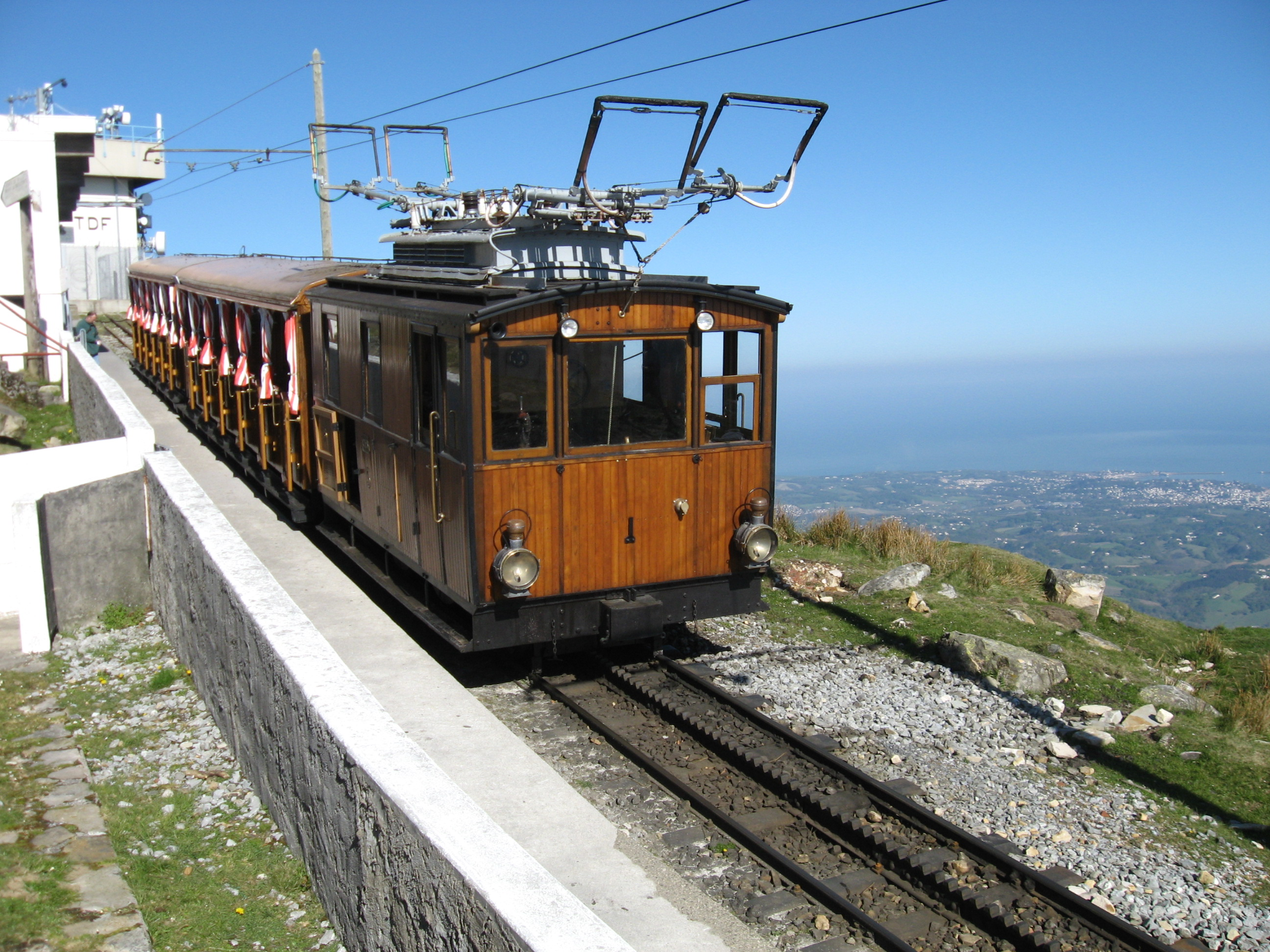
Train at summit station, showing the twin wires of the three-phase supply. The Atlantic coast can be seen in the background.

The idea of building a railway to the summit of La Rhune was first proposed in 1908, and a law passed in 1912 entrusted the construction and operation to the département. Work started on the construction of the line in 1912, but was suspended during World War I. The line opened on 30 June 1924. In a referendum in 1978, the population of the nearby village of Sare rejected a proposal to build a road to the summit of the Rhune, thus enabling the railway to survive.

The concession to build the line, and operate it until 1982, was granted by the département to the Société Anonyme des Chemins de Fer Basques, which changed its name to the Voies Ferrées Départementales du Midi in 1914. The original concession was extended until 1994 and, as a result of a merger, it was taken over by the Société Hydroélectrique du Midi in 1989.

In 1994, the concession expired and operation of the line reverted to the département. From 1995 until 2012 the line was operated under contract by CFTA, a subsidiary of Veolia Transport, a large international transport services business that also operates several other tourist railways in France. In 2012 Établissement public des stations d’altitude (EPSA) stepped in as operator.

Track and rack was replaced in the winter 2022/23, the Swiss company SERSA being the main contractor.

== Technical details ==
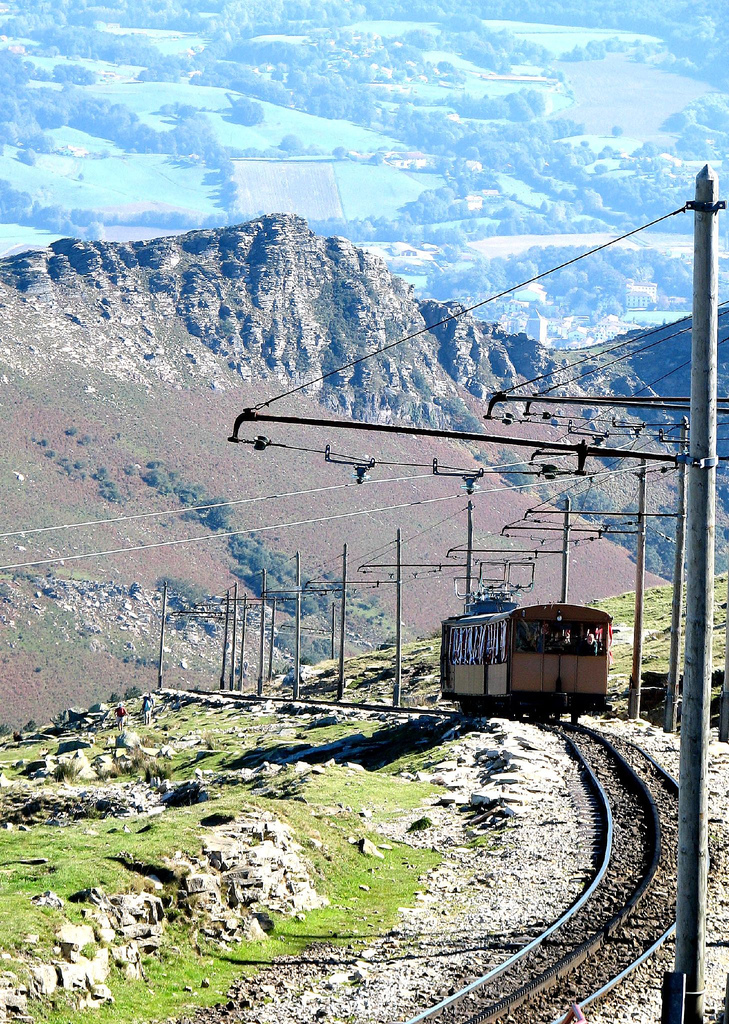
A train on the mountain.

The line has the following technical characteristics:

- Length: 4.2 km (2.6 mi)
- Rack system: Strub
- Altitude of bottom station: 169 m (554 ft)
- Altitude of upper station: 905 m (2,969 ft)
- Maximum gradient: 250 ‰
- Time of journey: 30 minutes
- Speed: 9 km/h (5.6 mph)
- Electricity supply: 3000 V, 50 Hz, three-phase

Trains consist of a four-wheeled electric locomotive that pushes two coaches up the mountain, and leads them down. Each coach is carried by a four-wheeled bogie at its upper end, and a single two-wheeled axle at its lower end. With six ten-seat compartments in each coach, each train carries 120 passengers.

The line operates from mid-March until early-November, with trains every 35 minutes.

The line is one of four lines in the world still using three-phase electric power to the locomotive, with two phases from the overhead catenary and one from the track.

== Rolling Stock ==
The railway still uses the rolling stock that was constructed for the opening in 1924. The entire fleet, power cars and cars, was completely overhauled after the change of concessionaire in 1996 by specialized companies, some of whom had access to the original drawings. Each train comprises a locomotive and two passenger carriages; the locomotive is always at the lower end of the train. The locomotive pushes the carriages uphill and brakes them downhill, two people are necessary for operating the train because the leading carriage has a brake cabin occupied by one member of staff.

=== Locomotives ===
The locomotives were built by SLM Winterthur and were based on the two axle three-phase AC locomotive designed in 1895 by Brown Boveri in Switzerland, and used on a number of rack & pinion railways. They are supplied with current via two double bow collectors and have two non-driving axles. The two 160 hp three-phase asynchronous motors, rotating at 750 rpm, drive two central toothed wheels via a pair of double reduction gears. The rack system is used for both driving and braking. The locomotives are equipped with two hand brakes, capable of stopping the train: they act on each toothed wheel via grooved drums located on either side. An automatic engine brake is triggered when the speed exceeds 9 km/h, it stops the train in a few meters. The locomotives push two carriages up the hill, and are not mechanically coupled to the carriages.

=== Carriages ===
The carriages were built by the Soulé company in Bagnères-de-Bigorre (now CAF); the carriage body consists of varnished wood (chestnut paneling from the Ardèche), and the roof of fir trees from the Pyrenees. The vehicle underframe is mounted on a bogie at the upper end of the vehicle, and on a single axle at the lower end, to improve their ability to go round the curves on the route. The cars each have one braked axle, capable of stopping the train in an emergency. A car is made up of six compartments each with ten seats, sixty in total. There are a total of 12 carriages, run in pairs.

Some of the rolling stock comes from the Luchon-Superbagnères rack railway (closed in 1966), being transferred in 1972-3. The two railway lines used the same original rolling stock.
