= Larrun =

Mountain in Navarre / France border

- La Rhune
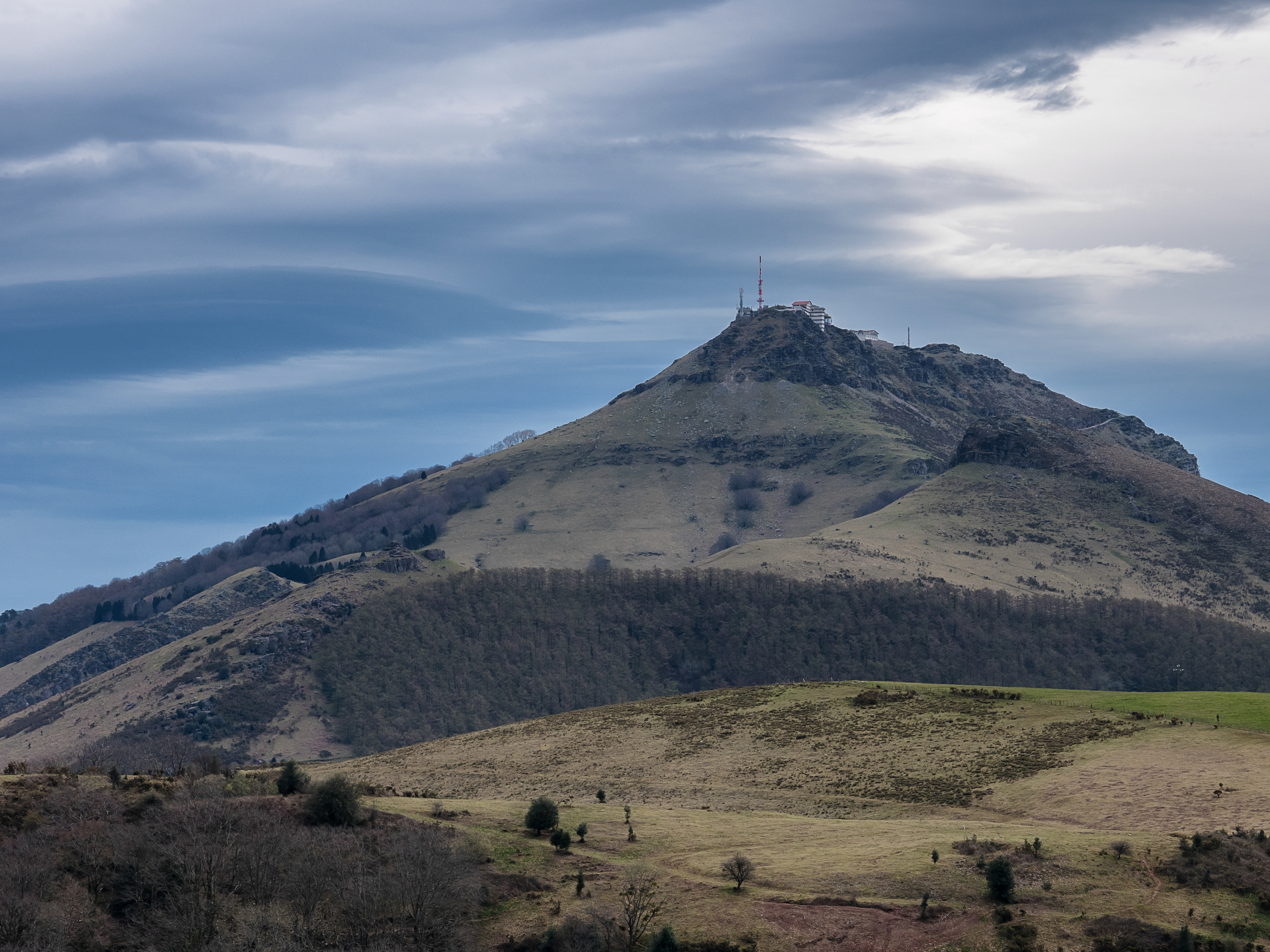

Highest point
- Elevation: 905 m (2,969 ft)
- Prominence: 670 m (2,200 ft)
- Coordinates: 43°18′33″N 1°38′08″W

Geography
- Location within Pyrenees
- Location: Pyrénées-Atlantiques, France; Navarre, Spain
- Parent range: Pyrenees

Larrun (Basque: Larhun, Larrun; French: La Rhune [la ʁyn]; Spanish: Larrún [laˈrun]; - 'good pasture', possibly a folk etymology, in French until the 20th century: Larhune) is a mountain (905 m) at the western end of the Pyrenees. It is located on the border of France and Spain, where the traditional Basque provinces of Labourd and Navarra meet. Its prominence is 670 m.

== History ==
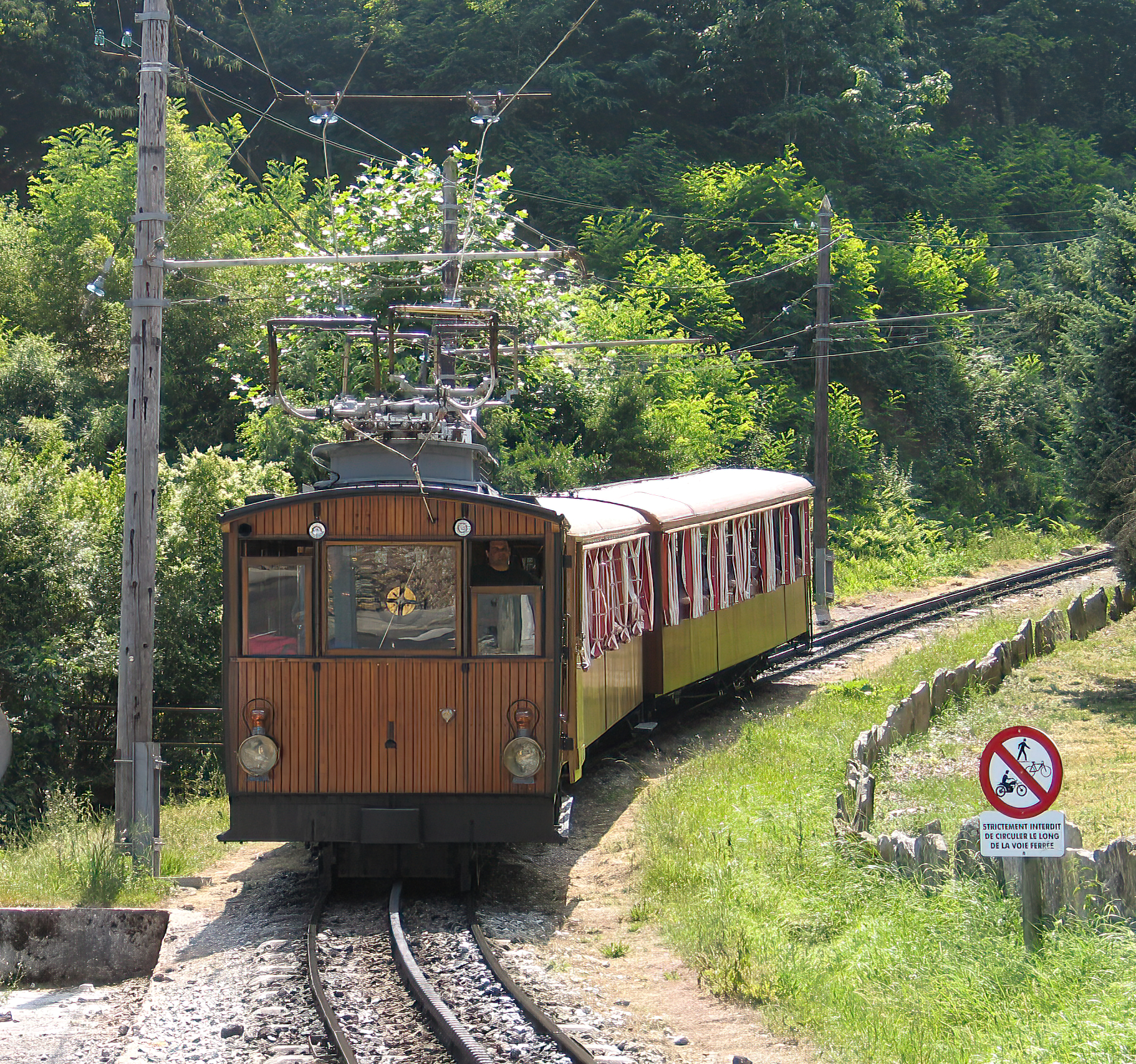
Le petit train de la Rhune

Larrun holds an iconic place in Basque culture. It is covered in dolmens, stone circles and other neolithic monuments and was held to be a sacred place in Basque mythology. It was said to be the home of Lehensugea, the first serpent. Later, and perhaps as a consequence of the ancient sacred sites, the summit had a reputation as an akelarre or ritual meeting place for witches. Up until the 18th century, local villages paid for a monk to live as a hermit at the top of the mountain to keep witches away and ensure good winds.

The mountain was used by French troops as a defensive position towards the end of the Peninsular War, but Wellington's forces drove those of Marshal Soult off the mountain during the Battle of Nivelle on November 10, 1813, this action leaving France open for Wellington's successful march north to Paris. The ruins of military fortifications built from this era are still there today.

Larrun and the local area were notable smuggling routes used for centuries, including for refugees during the Spanish Civil War and World War II. Smuggling was of such importance that a local tale tells that the mountain was covered by gold until evil men came to take it away. They burned the trees on the mountain to reach the gold, but the metal melted and flowed away.

The mountain started to become a popular destination for tourists following Eugenie de Montijo's holidays in Biarritz since 1864, and her outings to its summit.

== Today ==
Larrun is now a popular site for walks and hikes and is the first peak encountered on the coast-to-coast Haute Randonnée Pyrénéenne (HRP) walking route. A rack railway, the Petit train de la Rhune, takes visitors to the top of the mountain from the French side. Cows, a few pottok ponies and manech sheep wander the slopes.

Many inns and restaurants bear its name and its distinctive shape adorn many souvenirs and logos.
