= Fortifications of Larrun =

Military works situated at Larrun

- Larrun
- Larrun viewed from a Spanish outpost on the Mandalé

Site information
- Type: Redoubt
- Owner: Communal property, except for Mouiz, Chapelle de la Madeleine, Santa-Barbara, Bortuste and Louis XIV d'Urrugne (private property).
- Controlled by: France
- Condition: 13 MH-registered redoubts.

Location
- Coordinates: 43°18′33″N 1°38′08″W

Site history
- Built: From the last quarter of the 18th century to the first quarter of the 19th century. The Louis XIV redoubt at Sare is of protohistoric origin.
- Materials: Rock
- Battles/wars: French Revolutionary Wars (1763-1795) - Peninsular War (1813)

The fortifications of Larrun from the late modern period are a series of military works situated on the mountain of Larrun, immediately to the west of the border between Spain and France. Some of the structures were erected during the 1793-1794 campaign and repurposed to impede the advance of the Anglo-Hispano-Portuguese coalition troops, which the future Duke of Wellington led. More than twenty redoubts are distributed across the territories of Ascain, Sare, and Urrugne, with partial coverage also extending to those of Saint-Pée-sur-Nivelle and Biriatou.

The battles of the late 18th century were primarily concentrated in the commune of Urrugne. The revolutionary forces were deployed in the Louis XIV, Bertuste, Bayonet, and Emigrés redoubts, situated along the border and overlooking the Bidassoa River as well as the route from Vera de Bidassoa. This configuration proved effective in containing the advance of the Spanish attackers. Théophile de La Tour d'Auvergne, renowned as the "first grenadier of the Republic," distinguished himself notably during these confrontations.

The circumstances at the outset of the nineteenth century were markedly distinct. Wellington advanced as a conqueror and successfully breached the Sare lock, subsequently attacking the slopes of Larrun before heading toward Bayonne. The French army, under the command of Marshal Soult, demonstrated valor in their defense of the Zuhalmendi, Grenada, and Madeleine Chapel redoubts. The inadequacy of the defensive position, ill-suited to counterattacks, and the inexperience of the defenders at the Ermitebaïta and Mendibidea redoubts permitted the Anglo-Hispano-Portuguese coalition troops to breach the defensive line and ultimately force the French forces to retreat towards Saint-Pée-sur-Nivelle.

The redoubts, situated on elevated terrain, were constructed by two principal architectural designs, tailored to the local topography. Examples of star-shaped redoubts include the Santa Barbara, the so-called "BF 29" (Border Marker 29), and the Bayonet redoubts. Others adopt a fairly regular quadrilateral configuration, exemplified by the Madeleine Chapel redoubt, or a pentagonal shape, as observed in the Emigrés and Olhain Chapel redoubts. A third category encompasses less common shapes, such as the ovoid Louis XIV redoubt in Sare, which is presumed to be a reuse of a protohistoric structure. Thirteen of these fortifications have been designated as historical monuments.

== General overview of the setup ==
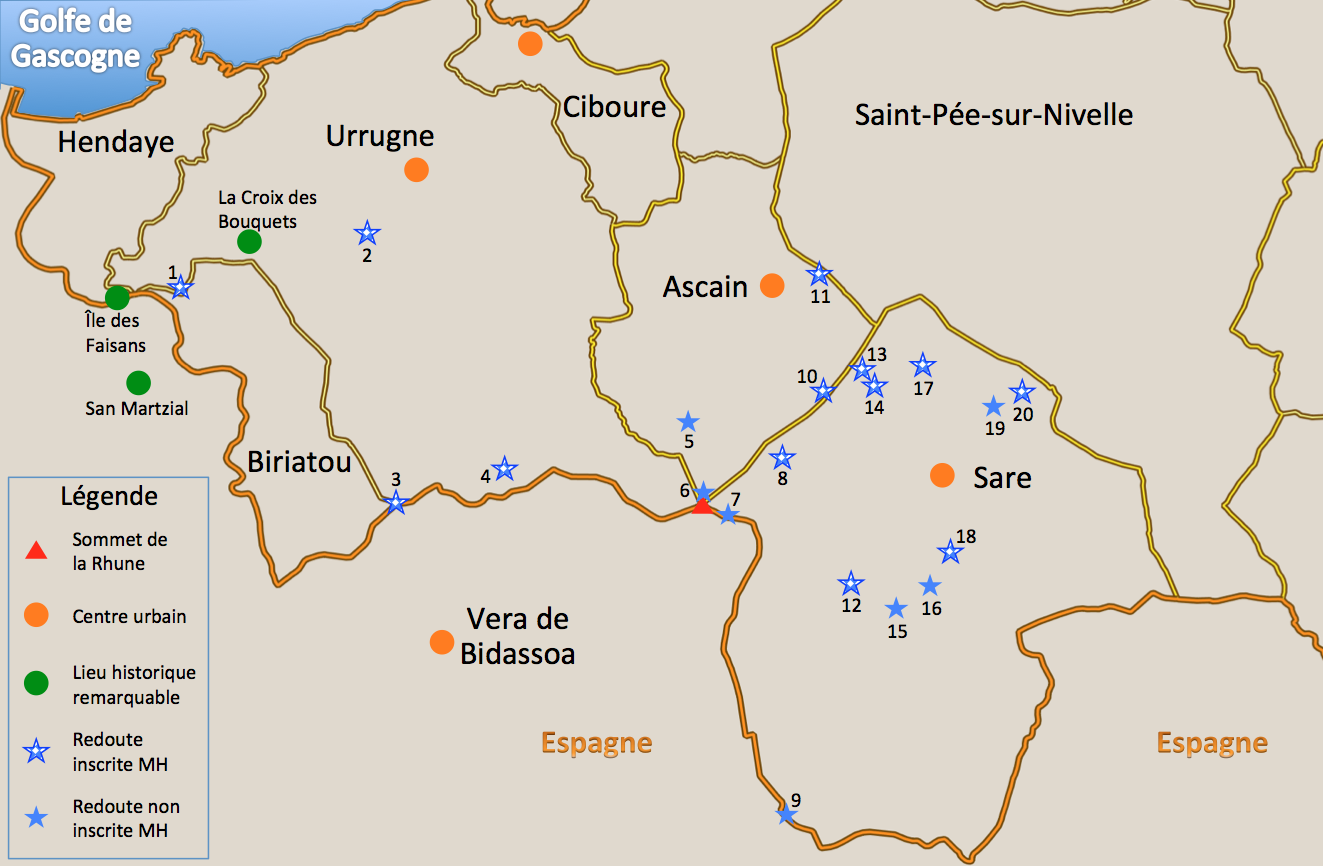
The Larrun defense system (a reference in bold type indicates an MH listing by the French Ministry of Culture).: 1. Louis XIV Redoubt. / 12. Olhain chapel redoubt.; 2. Bortuste Redoubt. / 13. Mendibidea Redoubt.; 3. Bayonnette Redoubt. / 14. Ermebaita Redoubt.; 4. Emigrés Redoubt. / 15. Monhoa Redoubt.; 5. Ihicelhaya fortress. / 16. Grenada Redoubt.; 6. Hermitage Redoubt. / 17. Zuhalmendi Redoubt.; 7. BF 29 Redoubt. / 18. Santa-Barbara Redoubt.; 8. Mouiz camp. / 19. Louis XIV Redoubt.; 9. Idoyko Biskarra Redoubt. / 20. Madeleine chapel Redoubt.; 10. Esnaur Redoubt.; 11. Bizkarzoun Redoubt.

Larrun represents the final summit of the Pyrenees mountain range before the Atlantic Ocean. The mountain reaches an elevation of 905 meters, with its summit and slopes divided between four communes: Vera de Bidassoa in Spain and Ascain, Sare, and Urrugne in France. It overlooks a series of hills that extend across the four localities. The elevations of Biscarzun (185 m) and Esnaur (272 m) are situated within the municipality of Ascain. Similarly, the elevations of Saint-Ignace (273 m), Suhamendy (301 m), Ibantelly (698 m), and Santa- The peak of Mount Barbara (140 m) is located in the commune of Sare, while Mount Faague (552 m) is situated in the same region. The peak of Mount San Benito (462 m) is located in the commune of Vera de Bidassoa. Finally, Mount Mendalé (573 m) is located in the commune of Urrugne. (Note: Lalanne 1991, p. 362)

The fortifications of Larrun are composed of star-shaped redoubts, also known as "bastioned," polygonal, or ovoid, situated on elevated ridges or knolls. Their construction may have been somewhat rudimentary, with some protected by simple ditches or backed by existing ruins, such as the Larrun Hermitage redoubt in Sare. Some, like the Louis XIV redoubt in Sare, have protohistoric origins.

These are modest, isolated fortifications designed to provide refuge for infantrymen, who would otherwise be compelled to form squares in open terrain. The generally uncovered nature of the trenches increased the mobility of the infantry, allowing them to move while remaining partially sheltered. However, these works offered minimal capacity for counterattacks, given the limited number of soldiers they could accommodate and the difficulty of exiting the trenches. It was only through external intervention that an assailed redoubt could be relieved. Some redoubts were equipped with artillery pieces, which, due to the steep slopes of Larrun, were often exposed to enemy fire. This configuration was particularly evident when the Allies captured the Hermitage redoubt at the summit of Larrun, resulting in the fortified Alchangue ridge becoming subject to their artillery fire. (Note: Lalanne 1991, p. 380)

== History ==
=== The battles of 1793-1794 ===
The execution of Louis XVI on January 21, 1793, served to exacerbate the underlying tensions between France and Spain. Consequently, on March 7 of the same year, the National Convention of France declared war on Charles IV, King of Spain. (Note: Antz 1993, p. 331) In the Basque Country, the battles—which had initially commenced in the Val d'Aran in Catalonia (Note: Lalanne 1989, p. 139)—focused on the valleys of the Bidassoa and Nivelle rivers. In 1793, the Committee of Public Safety constructed a redoubt at the summit of Larrun on the site of a previously destroyed hermitage. (Note: Lalanne 1989, p. 140)

The opposing forces included 8,000 French soldiers, positioned by General Servan—who served as War Minister until his resignation on October 3, 1792—in the communes of Sare, Hendaye, and Urrugne. (Note: Urrugne initially served as the base of operations for the 20th Infantry Regiment and two battalions of Basque chasseurs. These units will form the 40th half-brigade, which will be deployed on the ridges.) They were opposed by 2,200 Spaniards under the command of General Ventura Caro, who had been reinforced by the army of émigrés led by the Marquis of Saint-Simon.

The French forces were deployed in a manner that allowed them to exert control over three primary sectors. The route from Vera de Bidassoa to Ciboure, traversing the Col d’Insola and following the existing route through the Olhette district (Urrugne), was safeguarded by the Belchenea camp and a network of redoubts situated at the region’s summits. Notable among these were the Choucoutoun redoubt at an elevation of 94 meters, the Gendarmes redoubt, the Voltigeurs redoubt at an elevation of 81 meters, the Joliment redoubt, the Emigrés redoubt, and the Mendalé redoubt at an elevation of 573 meters. Furthermore, fortifications were constructed to safeguard the Bidassoa crossing between Biriatou and Béhobie. The French forces were distributed along the flanks of Croix des Bouquets, Xoldokogaña, Mont du Calvaire, Rocher des Perdrix, and Lumaberde. Finally, the Bidassoa estuary required the establishment or reinforcement of the Sans-Culottes, Ihartzecoborda, and Etsail redoubts from Croix des Bouquets, as well as the digging of trenches to protect the village of Hendaye from the Socorri hill.

A significant portion of the combat occurred within Urrugne's territory, which served as a base of operations for a contingent of French forces, including Théophile de La Tour d’Auvergne and generals Servan, Muller, Laroche-Dubouscat, and d’Elbhecq, at the Château d'Urtubie. In contrast, revolutionary troops were situated in Béhobie, Biriatou, or the fortified positions along the ridges.

The initial engagement was precipitated by a Spanish incursion on April 23, 1793, while the French military forces were still undergoing reorganization. (Note: Lalanne 1989, p. 141) The decree formally establishing the Army of the Western Pyrenees was promulgated on May 1. The Spanish offensive focused on Fort Hendaye and the Louis XIV redoubt in Urrugne, which came under artillery bombardment. The French volunteers were compelled to withdraw to Croix des Bouquets.

On May 1, Spanish troops captured the redoubt at the summit of Larrun and established a settlement there. On May 2, another Spanish attack on Hendaye was repelled beyond the Bidassoa by French troops, with La Tour d'Auvergne distinguishing himself by his courageous conduct. On May 26, 1794, French troops under the command of La Tour d’Auvergne once again attempted to seize the Larrun redoubt. Despite encountering fierce resistance on the heights of Santa-Barbara (also known as Sainte-Barbe), a hill located in the commune of Sare, they were ultimately forced to withdraw. (Note: Antz 1993, p. 332)

On July 13, another Spanish offensive was repelled, resulting in the enemy troops occupying Biriatou and positions along the Bidassoa. In response, the French headquarters withdrew to a position north of the Nivelle River, where they reinforced their troops with recruits who had undergone training at a camp in Bidart until early 1794. On February 5, 1794, hostilities resumed when a column of 13,000 Spanish infantrymen and 700 cavalrymen entered France via the road from Vera de Bidassoa. The Mont du Calvaire and Mendalé positions were subsequently occupied by the attacking forces, who were subsequently repelled by the French. The latter subsequently recaptured the positions, which were then renamed the "Bayonet Redoubt" due to the intense bayonet fighting that occurred there.

=== The Battles of October and November 1813 ===
Following the defeat at Vitoria on June 21, 1813—which resulted in the withdrawal of the French troops escorting Joseph Bonaparte—and the subsequent defeats at Sorauren on July 25 and San Marcial on August 31, Arthur Wellesley's troops found themselves positioned on the banks of the Bidassoa. In a letter to William Carr Beresford dated October 2, 1813, the Duke of Wellington articulated his intentions. "[...] the heights of the Bidassoa afford such an extensive view that it would be prudent to secure them with minimal delay." Marshal Soult, in command of the French forces, had partially fortified the heights and approaches to the Bidassoa but appeared more preoccupied with the fate of Pamplona, which had been under siege by General Enrique José O'Donnell's Spanish troops since June 26. (Note: Brialmont 1857, p. 159)

French generals engaged in the Battles of October and November 1813 (Selection).

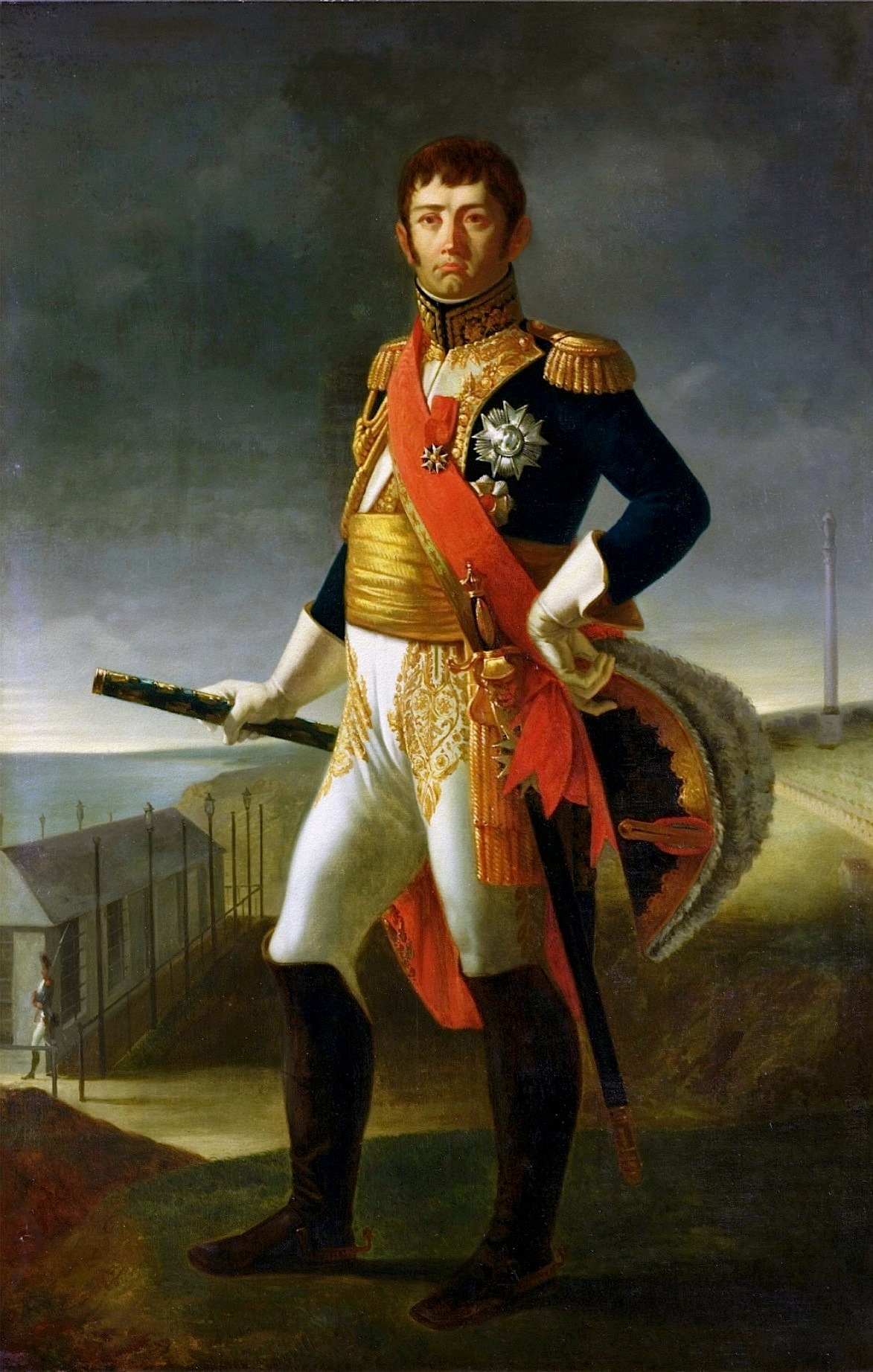
Marshal Soult.

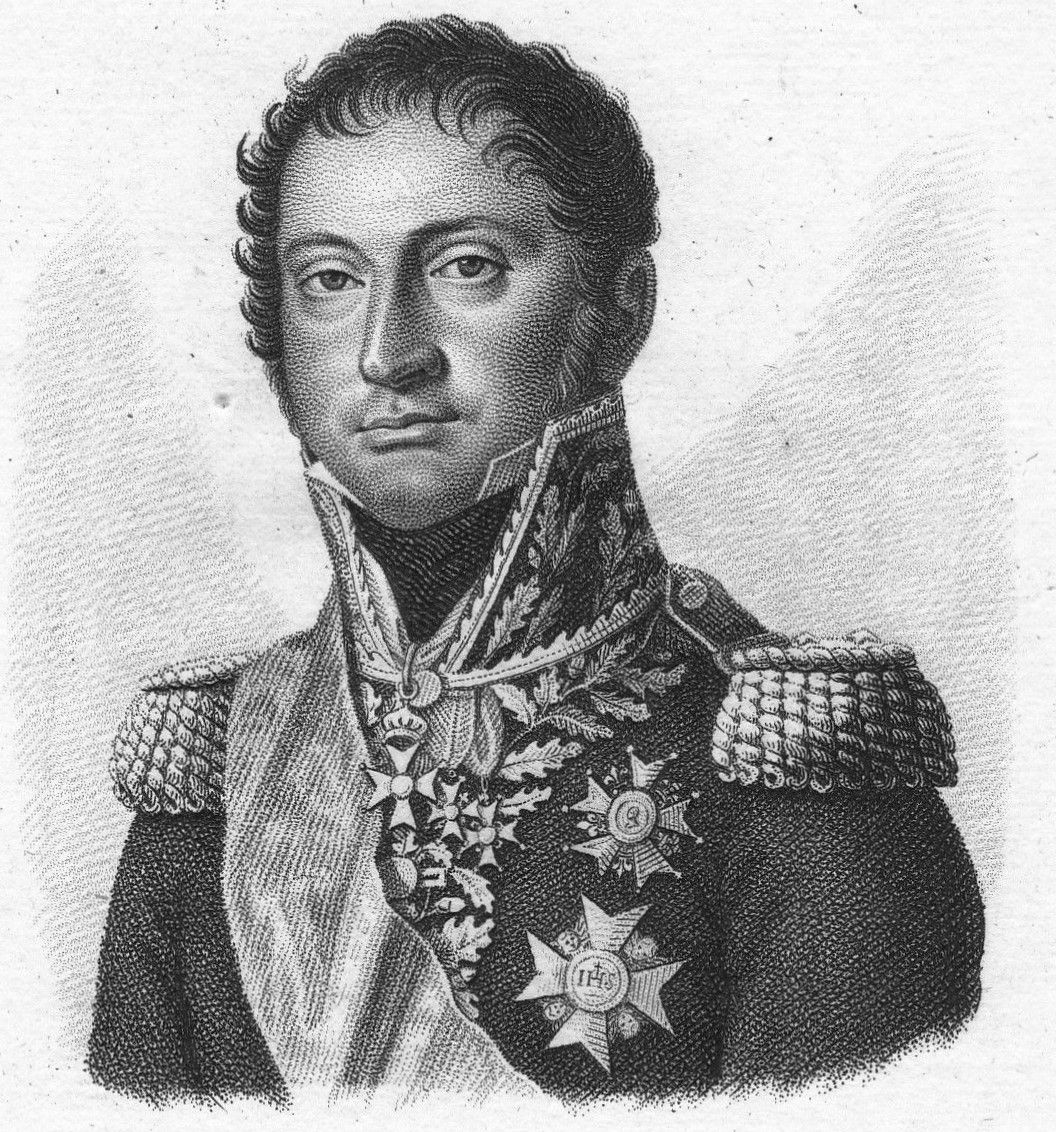
Honoré Charles Reille.

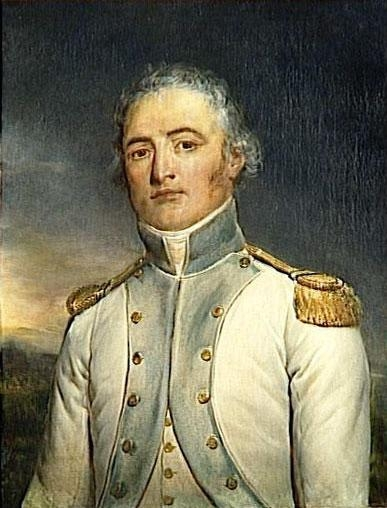
Bertrand Clauzel.

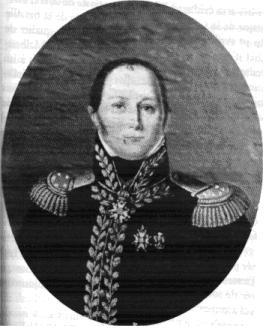
Eloi Charlemagne Taupin.

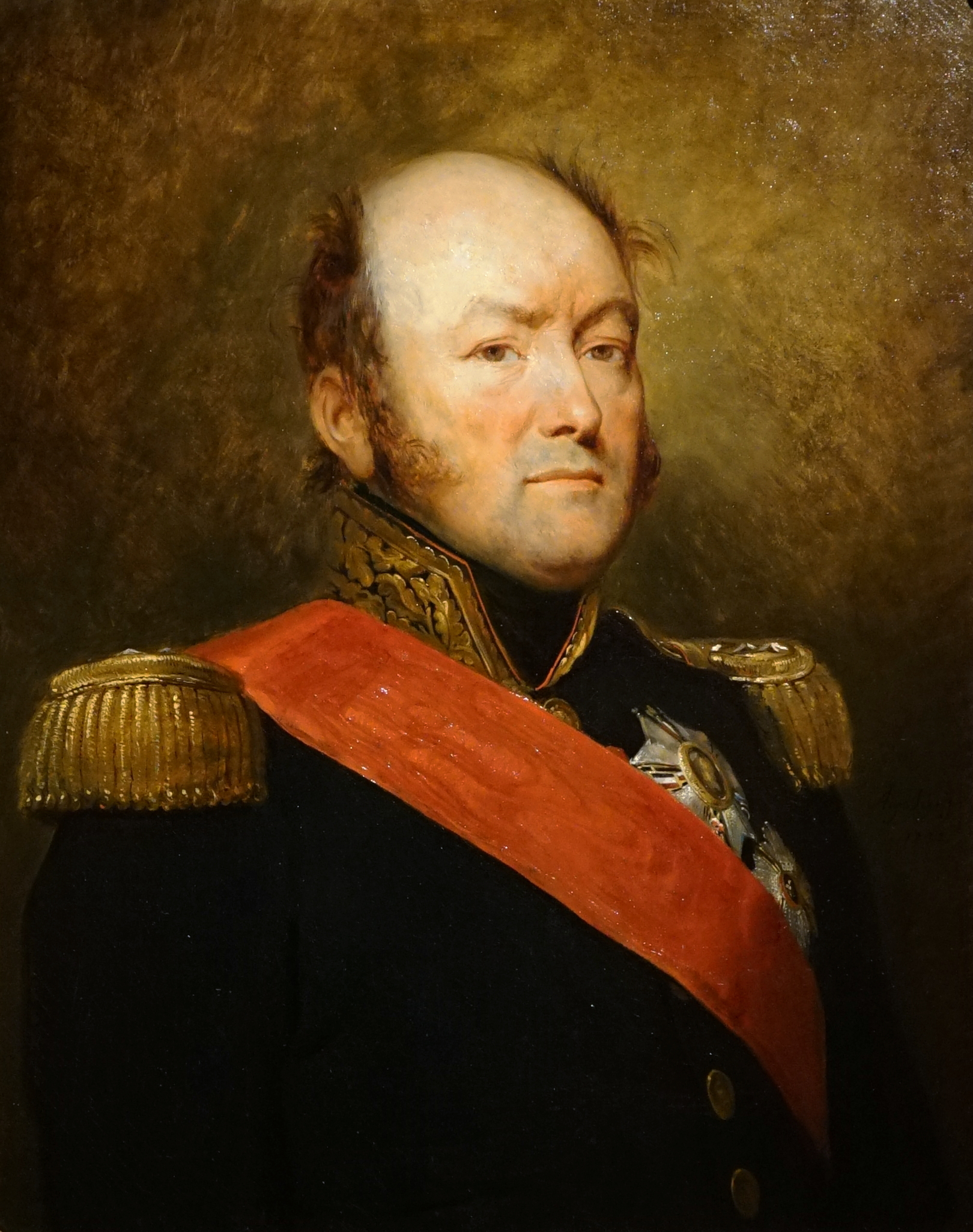
Jean-Baptiste Drouet d'Erlon.

The two armies were positioned in such a way that they were facing each other. On the French side, Marshal Soult (also known as the "Duke of Dalmatia") divided his forces into three groups. (Note: The majority of the French forces are infantry, with a total of 60,000 men. In addition to the defensive lines, General Foy's division and the cavalry provide further reinforcement, with a combined total of 29,000 soldiers. (Note: Brialmont 1857, p. 179)) To the west, Reille's two divisions, commanded by Boyer and Maucune, were responsible for covering the right flank between Urrugne and Ciboure. The center was held by Clauzel's three divisions, led by Taupin, Maransin, and Conroux, (Note: The Taupin division is currently positioned within the Souhamendi Redoubt and the adjacent Mendibidea and Ermitebaita strong points. The Maransin division is responsible for defending the Mendiondo pass, situated between the Louis XIV Redoubt of Sare and the aforementioned Souhamendi. The Conroux division is currently holding the position between the Nivelle d'Amotz and the Louis XIV Redoubt of Sare. (Note: Gaudeul 1985, p. 215)) which were responsible for guarding the heights of Larrun, Sare, and Ascain. These divisions were supported by elements of Darricau's division in the Ascain-Serres sector. To the east, between Amotz and Mondarrain, were the divisions of Erlon and Abbé. (Note: Lalanne 1991, p. 363) Marshal Soult resided in Saint-Jean-de-Luz.

The Anglo-Hispano-Portuguese coalition, under the command of Wellesley, advanced along a common front line, with George Ramsay's British and O'Donnell's Spanish divisions situated to the east, between Zugarramurdi and Echalar, while Alten maintained control of the Lizuniaga pass, advancing from Vera de Bidassoa. The western flank, facing Reille's divisions, was occupied by Longa and Freyre's troops. (Note: The coalition comprises 90,000 men, nearly 75,000 of whom are of Anglo-Portuguese origin. They are supported by 95 cannons.)

On October 7, an assault force of 15,000 allied troops crossed the Bidassoa. The so-called "Cross of the Bouquets" combat occurred in Urrugne. The French were taken unawares, as the preceding night's inclement weather had obfuscated the assailants' preparations. They crossed the Bidassoa at three distinct fords upstream of Fontarabie, (Note: "The crossing of the Bidassoa took place at low tide, near Andaye. Neither the army nor the inhabitants would have ever guessed that the enemy could penetrate so easily from this direction, and although it was a surprise and our arms' honor suffered no stain, the damage was nonetheless irreparabl [...]" (Note: Brialmont 1857, p. 161)) whereas Soult anticipated that the primary assault would occur in the Ainhoa region, situated to the east of Sare. (Note: Lalanne 1989, p. 143) Reille's forces, which had taken up position in the Louis XIV redoubt in Urrugne by 7:30 that morning, were overwhelmed by Graham's column. (Note: General Reille "lost 8 cannons and 400 men. The Allies lost 600.") Neither Reille nor Clauzel was able to engage their reserves in time, as Montfort and Boyer's brigades were at Calvaire Mountain and Poiriers Pass in Biriatou, and Gauthier's brigade was at Bordegain. (Note: Lalanne 1989, p. 144) (Note: Marshal Soult's report to General Clarke, then Minister of War, specifies: "…General Maucune's division was in line from the left of Biriatou to Hendaye. The 9th division, under General Boyer's orders, was in reserve at the camp, left of Urrugne, to support it. For several days, I had directly warned the generals that the enemy was planning to attack us and had prescribed the necessary dispositions. During the night of the 5th to the 6th and that of the 6th to the 7th, movements of vehicles were heard towards Irun; the enemy began crossing the Bidassoa between six and seven o'clock; it was broad daylight, and there was time to see him form his masses. The 7th division was too weak to resist him; the 9th should have joined it much earlier, but it arrived at the base of the Croix-des-Bouquets only when the enemy was already in control. However, it engaged and facilitated the retrograde movement of the 7th division. The troops stood firm and withdrew behind Urrugne, to lean on the fortified camp of Bordagain.")

On October 7, 1813, at 4 a.m., an additional 20,000 men initiated an assault on the fortifications of Larrun. The fighting concluded at nightfall, with the French forces still maintaining control of Larrun at the cost of 1,000 casualties on each side. Wellington then opted to circumvent the French defensive positions at Olhain and proceeded to capture the Santa Barbara (or Sainte-Barbe) redoubt. On October 8, the French troops evacuated the Larrun hermitage (Ermitebaita) and commenced a strategic withdrawal to the Alchangue ridge. The battles of October 7 and 8 concluded with 1,400 French casualties and 1,600 Allied casualties. (Note: Lalanne 1991, p. 364)

On the night of October 12-13, the French troops under the command of Conroux recaptured the Santa Barbara redoubt, maintaining control of the position despite a Spanish assault that resulted in the loss of 500 men for the opposing forces. By the conclusion of the battles that transpired between October 7 and 13, the Allied forces had established a foothold along the border ridge, encompassing the Olhain Chapel redoubt, the summit of Larrun, and the entirety of the ridge overlooking the Bidassoa. This included the Urrugne redoubts of the Emigrés, Bayonnette, and Louis XIV. (Note: Gaudeul 1984, p. 251) The front stabilized, and a tacit peace emerged, leading the French and British to avoid engaging in combat in certain areas on the southern slope of Petite Larrun. (Note: According to Harry Smith "such arrangements were frequent... This shows that enemies belonging to civilized armies can behave as gentlemen. Such courtesy did not exist between the English and the Spanish.")

Allied generals engaged in the Battles of October and November 1813 (Selection).

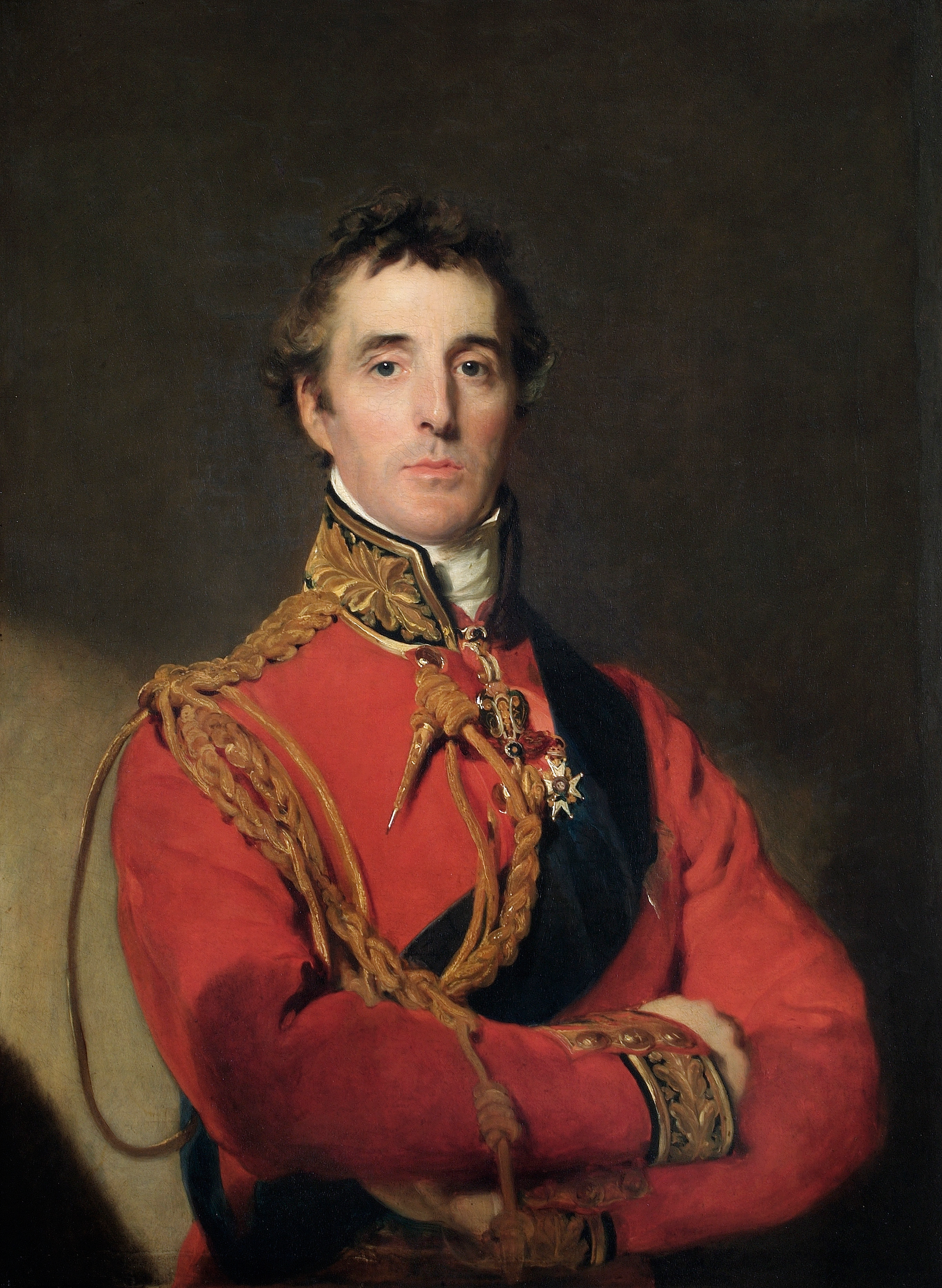
The Duke of Wellington.

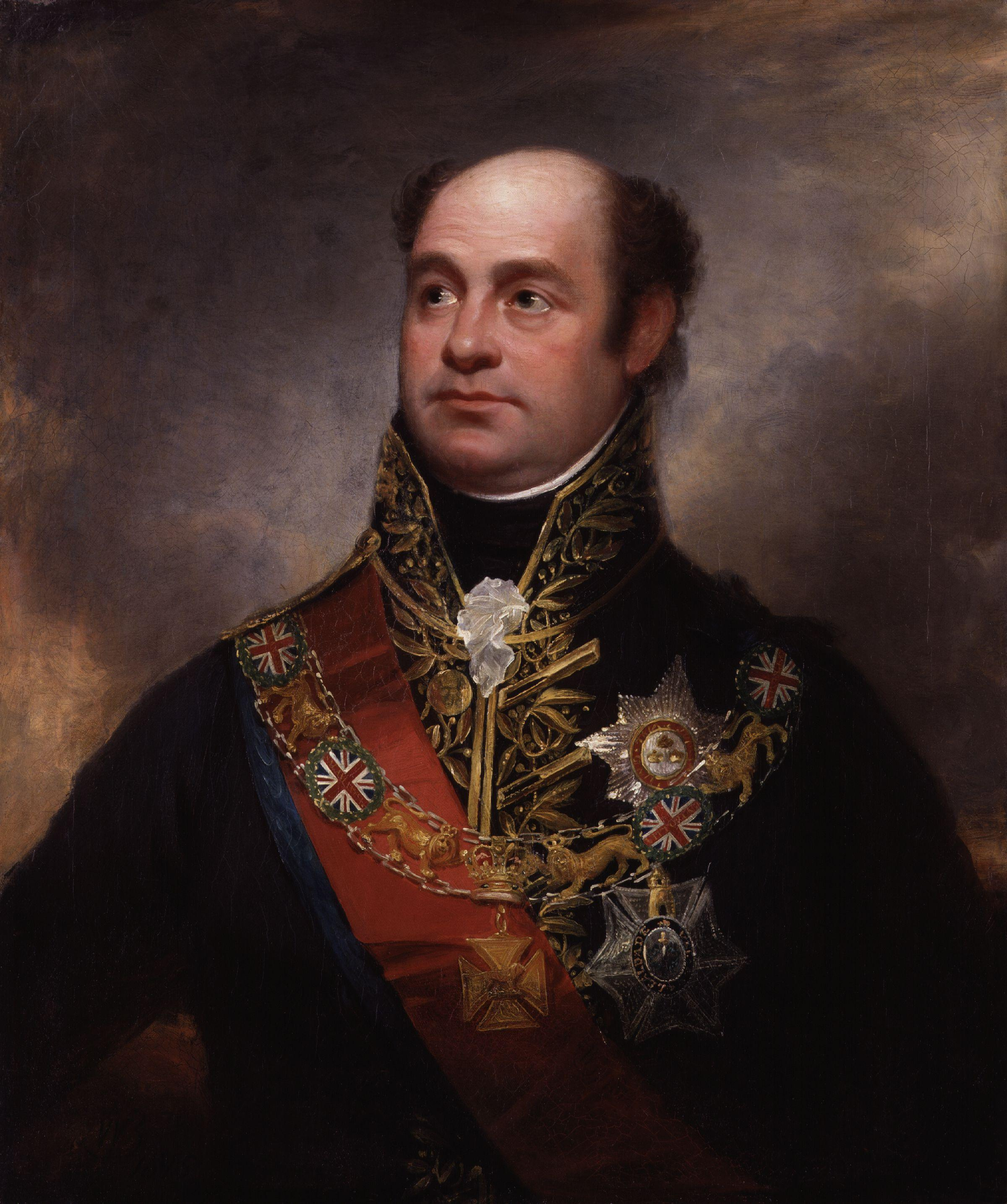
William Carr Beresford.

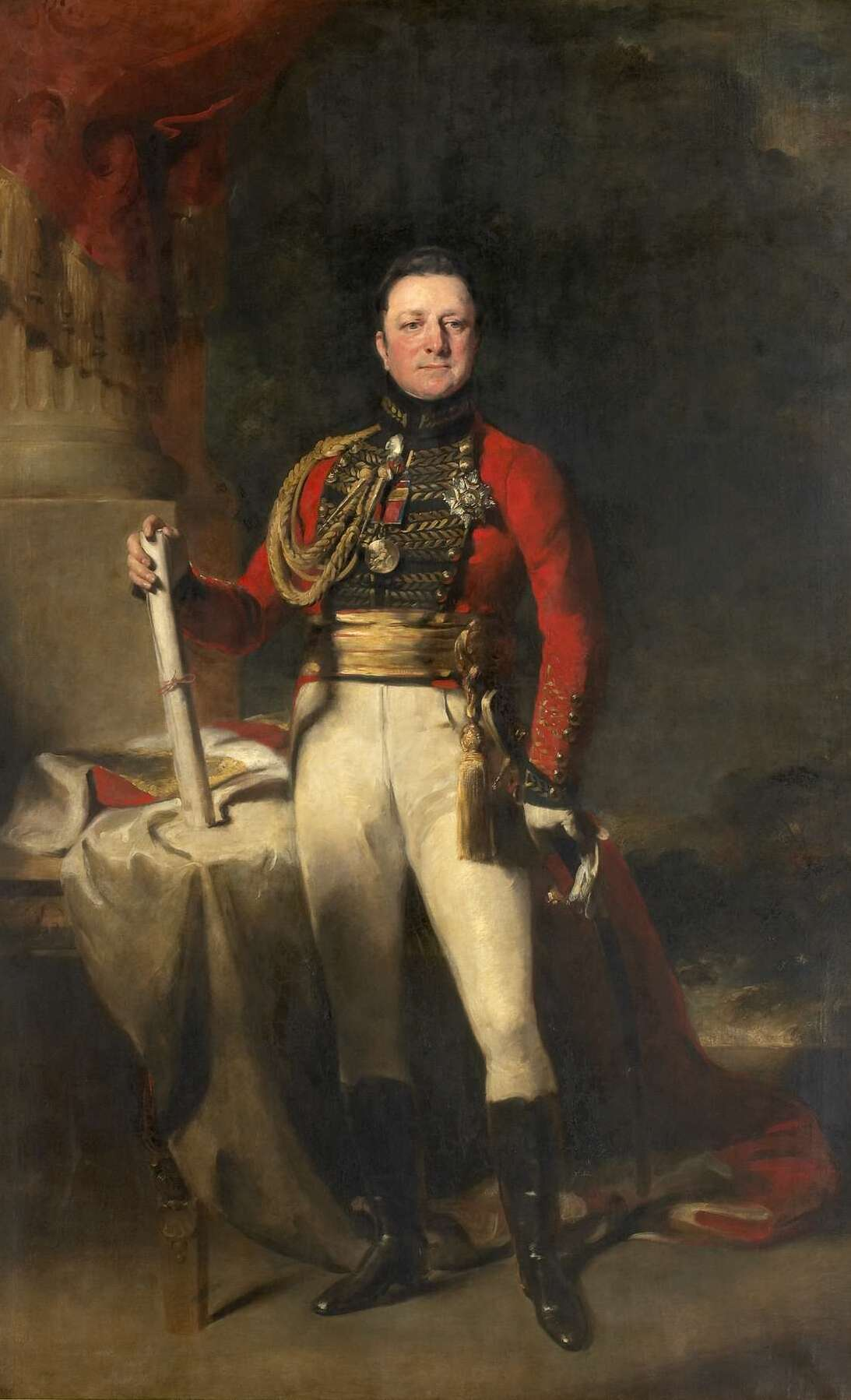
George Ramsay.

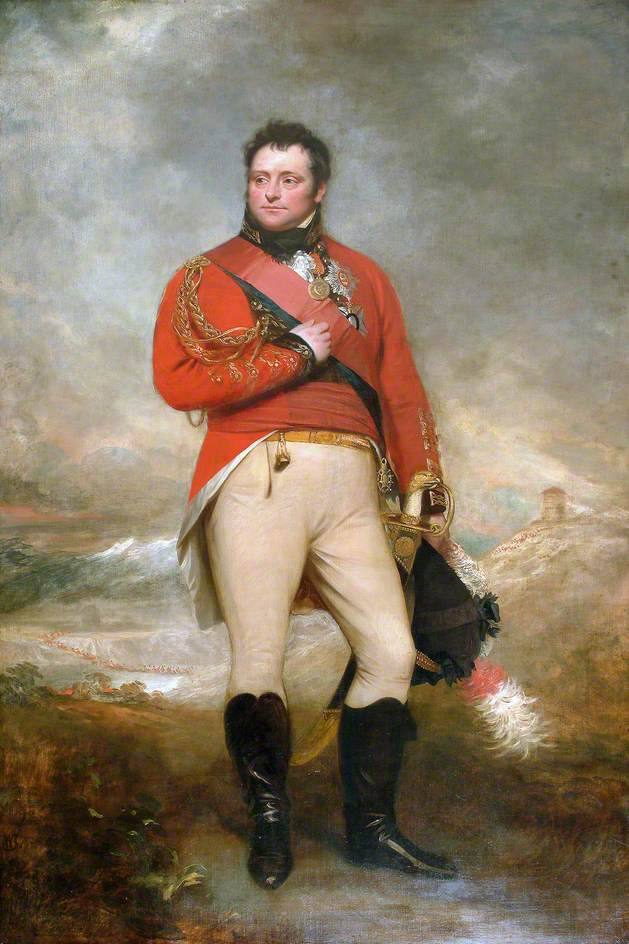
Rowland Hill.

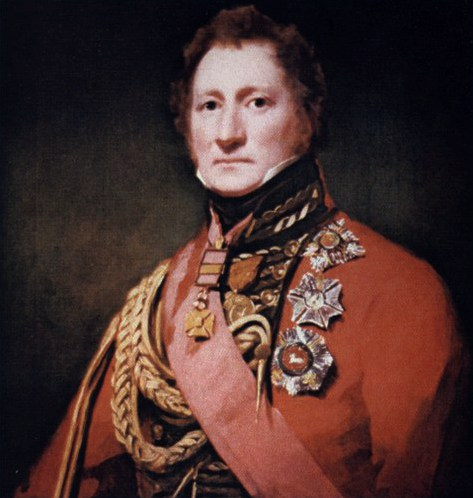
Charles Colville.

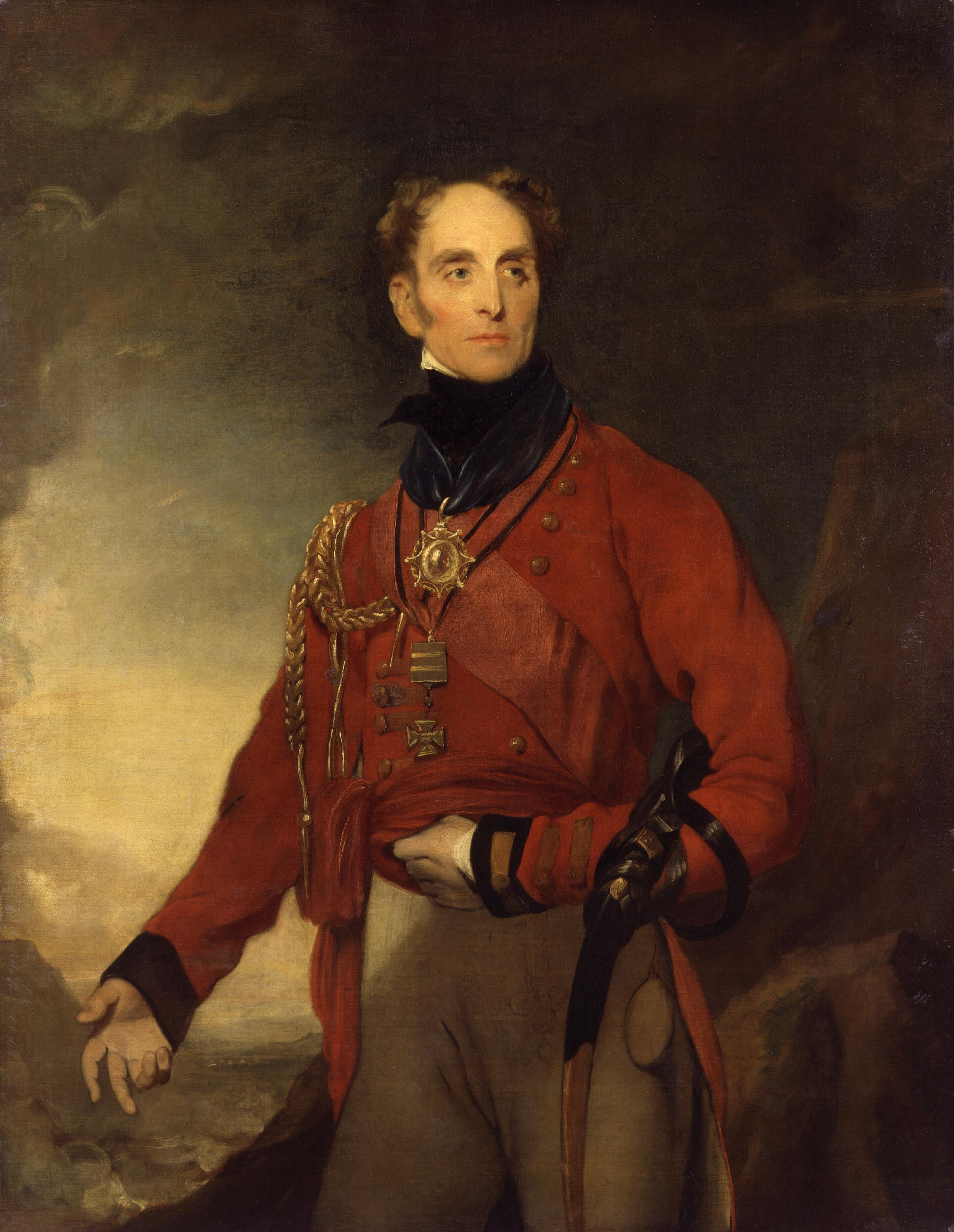
Galbraith Lowry Cole.

Wellington was informed on October 20 that the defense forces in Pamplona were unable to maintain their position for more than a week. This information was obtained from an intercepted letter from the governor of Pamplona. The city subsequently surrendered on October 31, allowing the Allied forces to concentrate their troops on the French border. (Note: Brialmont 1857, p. 178) In light of the French reversals in Germany—the Battle of Leipzig concluded on October 19 with the withdrawal of Napoleonic forces—the Allied commander opted to concede to the mounting pressures from the allied sovereigns and launch an invasion of France from the south. (Note: In July 1813, Wellington declined the proposal to transport his troops by sea to the Netherlands, where they would have constituted the right wing of a vast military force to invade France.) (Note: Brialmont 1857, p. 172)

On November 10, Wellington initiated a significant military operation, deploying 40,000 troops against the fortifications of Larrun and into the Nivelle Valley. (Note: Lalanne 1991, p. 365) (Note: The attack, which was initially scheduled for November 8, was postponed to the 10th due to the adverse effects of heavy precipitation on the road conditions.) The French center, under the command of Clauzel, was subjected to an assault in the Sare sector by eight divisions. Wellington's strategy entailed capturing the village, which represented a significant vulnerability in the defense line and subsequently advancing towards Saint-Pée-sur-Nivelle and Amotz. His objective was to maneuver on Bayonne, thereby dividing the French army and compelling it to engage on multiple fronts. (Note: "…The position of Sarre (sic) left an interval of more than half a league between the height of the Rhune and the Amotz bridge on the Nivelle, presenting the enemy with an easy outlet to penetrate France and turn the Pyrenean line; only one redoubt, called Sainte-Barbe, defended this passage." (Note: Brialmont 1857, p. 180)) At dawn, the Allied forces, under the command of General Colville, successfully captured the Santa-Barbara and Grenada redoubts and initiated an offensive against the Alchangue positions. The positions held by Clauzel and Erlon were breached by 40,000 men under the command of Hill and Beresford. (Note: Clauzel is obliged to confront 24,000 troops under the command of Rowland Hill, while Erlon is confronted with 16,000 men under the command of Beresford.) Meanwhile, Reille's right flank was subjected to assaults from Hope, who commanded 19,000 men and 54 cannons. Hope was also supported by the Royal Navy. (Note: The objective of General Le Cor's division is to target the Grenada and Louis XIV Redoubts. In contrast, the objective of Cole and Girón is to capture Mendiondokoborda and the Suhalmendi Redoubt. Meanwhile, Alten and Longa are tasked with capturing the Little Rhune, the ridge, and the Altxanga plateau, as well as the Saint-Ignace pass. Finally, Freire is responsible for securing Accent and Colville of the Amotz bridge.) The Mouiz camp was evacuated by the French forces before 8 a.m., with the troops subsequently retreating to Sare. By 11 a.m., the Louis XIV and Saint-Ignace redoubts had also been captured. (Note: Lalanne 1991, p. 366)

The Allied divisions under the command of Generals Le Cor, Cole, Alten, Longa, and Freyre were able to gain the upper hand over the French defenders. They were able to infiltrate through "all-natural corridors," pursuing the retreating French in disorder towards Saint-Pée-sur-Nivelle, then Bidart and Arrauntz (Ustaritz district). (Note: Gaudeul 1985, p. 216)

British troops entered Saint-Pée-sur-Nivelle at approximately 2 p.m., while Longa's division proceeded to occupy Ascain, which was subsequently pillaged overnight. (Note: In accordance with Wellington's orders, the officers of this division, including Longa, were apprehended and subsequently tried. Thereafter, the division was promptly dispatched back to Spain.) By the end of November 10, the French army remained deployed to the east, supported by the Nive and Larressore under the command of Drouet d'Erlon. Its center was situated near Bayonne on the Saint-Pée road, while to the west, it occupied the Nivelle Valley from Saint-Jean-de-Luz to Serres under the command of Reille. (Note: Gaudeul 1985, p. 223) The Allied troops maintained control of Urrugne, Sare, Ascain, Saint-Pée-sur-Nivelle, Souraïde, and Espelette. French losses totaled 4,265 people, (Note: General Conroux succumbed to his wounds on November 11th, following injuries sustained during the conflict. (Note: Brialmont 1857, p. 181)) including 1,400 prisoners, along with 51 cannons and the stores of Espelette and Saint-Jean-de-Luz. The Allies sustained 2,694 casualties.

From the top of Rhune, observe the long line of summits crowned by redoubts; see on their slopes the short and modest linéaments of trenches, too spaced to support each other; place our unfortunate divisions in their positions; follow the march of the enemy columns winding from height to valley up to the slopes of the Atome barrier, ascending, preceded by a swarm of skirmishers that blinds the defense and overwhelms the redoubts, and you will recognize that no human genius could have saved us from disaster. (Note: Lorblanchès 2013, p. 64: Charles Clerc, quoted by Jean-Claude Lorblanchès)

— Charles Clerc, cited by Jean-Claude Lorblanchès, Campagne de l'armée impériale du Pays basque à Toulouse (1813-1814), 2013, p. 65.

== The redoubts of Ascain ==
Ascain Redoubts, MH listed.

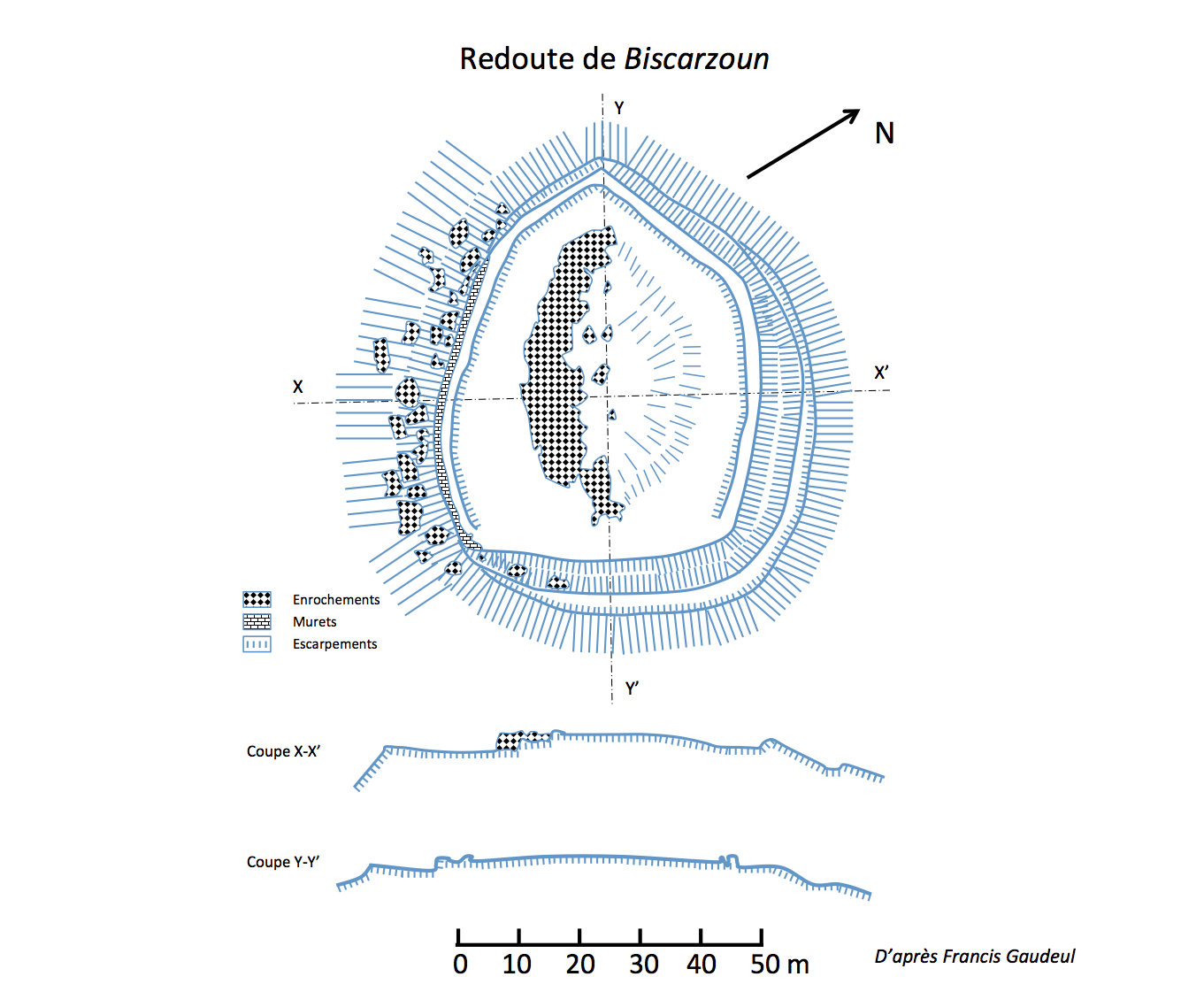
The Biscarzoun Redoubt.

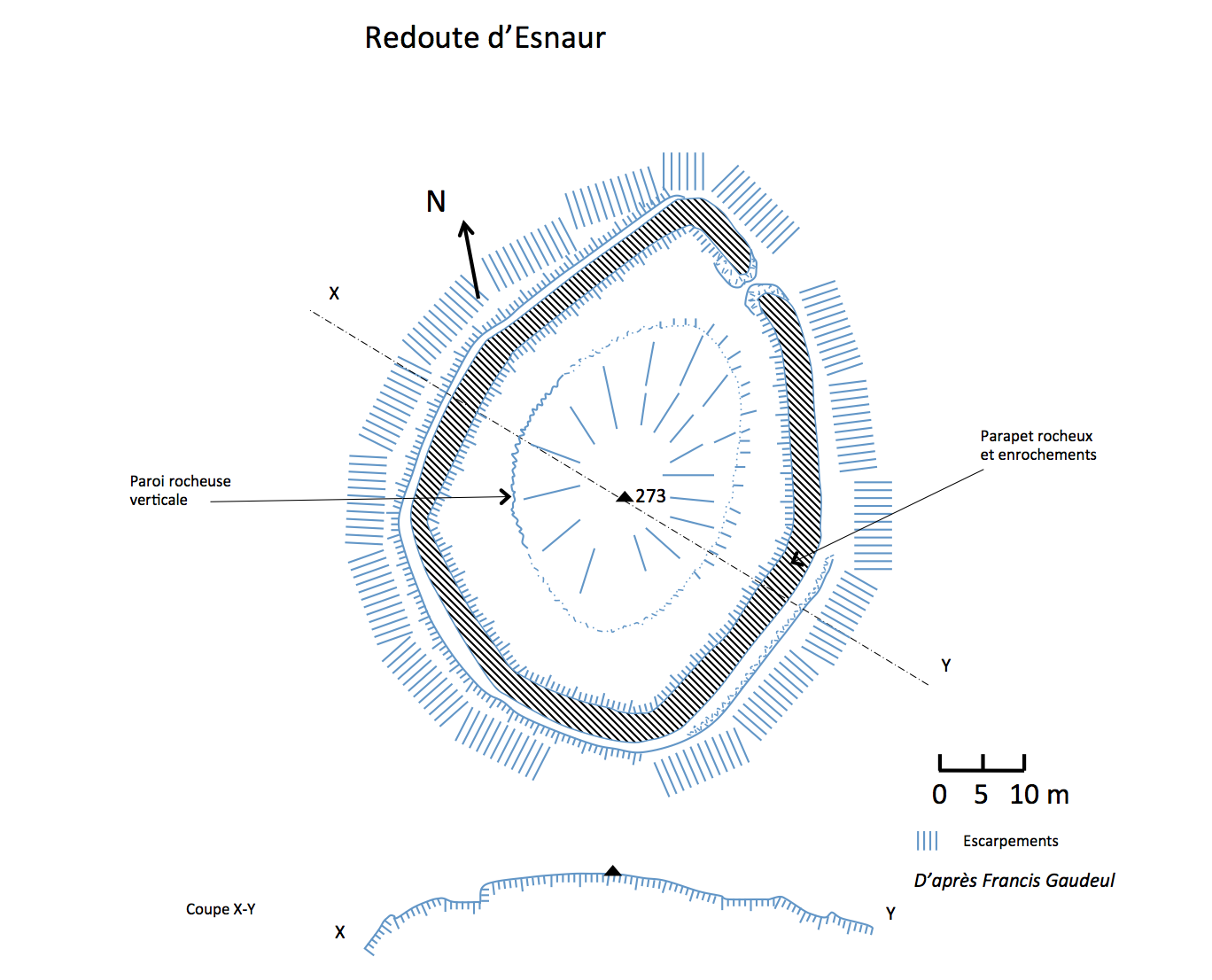
The Esnaur Redoubt.

The redoubts of Biskarzoun and Esnaur are situated on two mounds overlooking Ascain, affording observation of potential attackers' approach from all directions. (Note: Gaudeul 1985, p. 219) Although isolated from the remainder of the position and still incomplete at dawn on November 10, 1813, the redoubts were sufficiently substantial to withstand a direct attack due to their location. (Note: Gaudeul 1985, p. 220) Initially, both works appeared to have been held by units from Taupin's division, particularly the 47th line.

The Biskarzoun Redoubt, also known as Biscarzoun or Biskarzun, is situated at an elevation of 185 meters and provides a strategic overlook of the village of Ascain. The structure takes the form of an irregular heptagon, with a pile of rocks situated at its center. The structure's perimeter measures approximately 100 meters, with an area of approximately 650 square meters. To the southeast of the position, a semicircular trench was dug into a terrain ledge approximately 75 meters from the redoubt. This trench allowed defenders to cover the blind spot that hindered artillery from the main fortification. Similarly, it appears that the Biskarzoun redoubt was captured without a fight, presumably at the direction of Taupin, as no evidence of a struggle was discovered. (Note: Lalanne 1991, p. 368) It also encompasses the commune of Saint-Pée-sur-Nivelle and has been designated a historic monument since 1992.

The Esnaur Redoubt is situated at an altitude of 273 meters and serves as a dominant defensive position along the route leading to the Saint-Ignace pass. The structure replicates the Biskarzoun Redoubt in a larger format, forming an irregular seven-sided polygon with an area of 2,200 m^{2} and a perimeter of 150 meters. A crown of 6 to 9 meters surrounds it, at times excavated into the rock through techniques analogous to those employed in certain protohistoric "terraced" enclosures. An oval platform marks its center. This fortification has been designated a historic monument since 1992.

The natural fortress of Ihicelhaya serves to protect Ascain from incursions from the south, situated at an elevation of 419 meters. Battles are known to have taken place there, as evidenced by the presence of a dry stone wall, although the precise dates remain uncertain, with some sources indicating 1793-1794 and others 1813. Galleries have been excavated into the rock, forming a structure measuring approximately fifty meters in length and twenty meters in width. (Note: Lalanne 1991, p. 371) The redoubt of the hermitage is situated at the summit of the Larrun. It is a dry stone construction erected on the foundations of the former chapel. It housed an allied battery of cannons, enabling them to reach the fortified crest of Alchangue.

Several fortifications were obliterated in the 20th century, subsumed beneath the processes of urbanization and development. Notable among these are the redoubts of Chanoneta, Uramendi, and Beheré. (Note: Lalanne 1991, p. 369) The Teilleria, or Tuileries, redoubt was situated in the Serres area, between Saint-Jean-de-Luz and Ascain. The fortification served as the Serres camp, where reserve troops were stationed. It was also destroyed by 20th-century developments and formed a pentagon perched at an altitude of 57 meters, 500 meters from the chapel in the hamlet of Serres. It controlled the Nivelle, Ascain, and the road to Saint-Jean-de-Luz.

== The redoubts of Sare ==
Fortifications of the Mouiz entrenched camp.

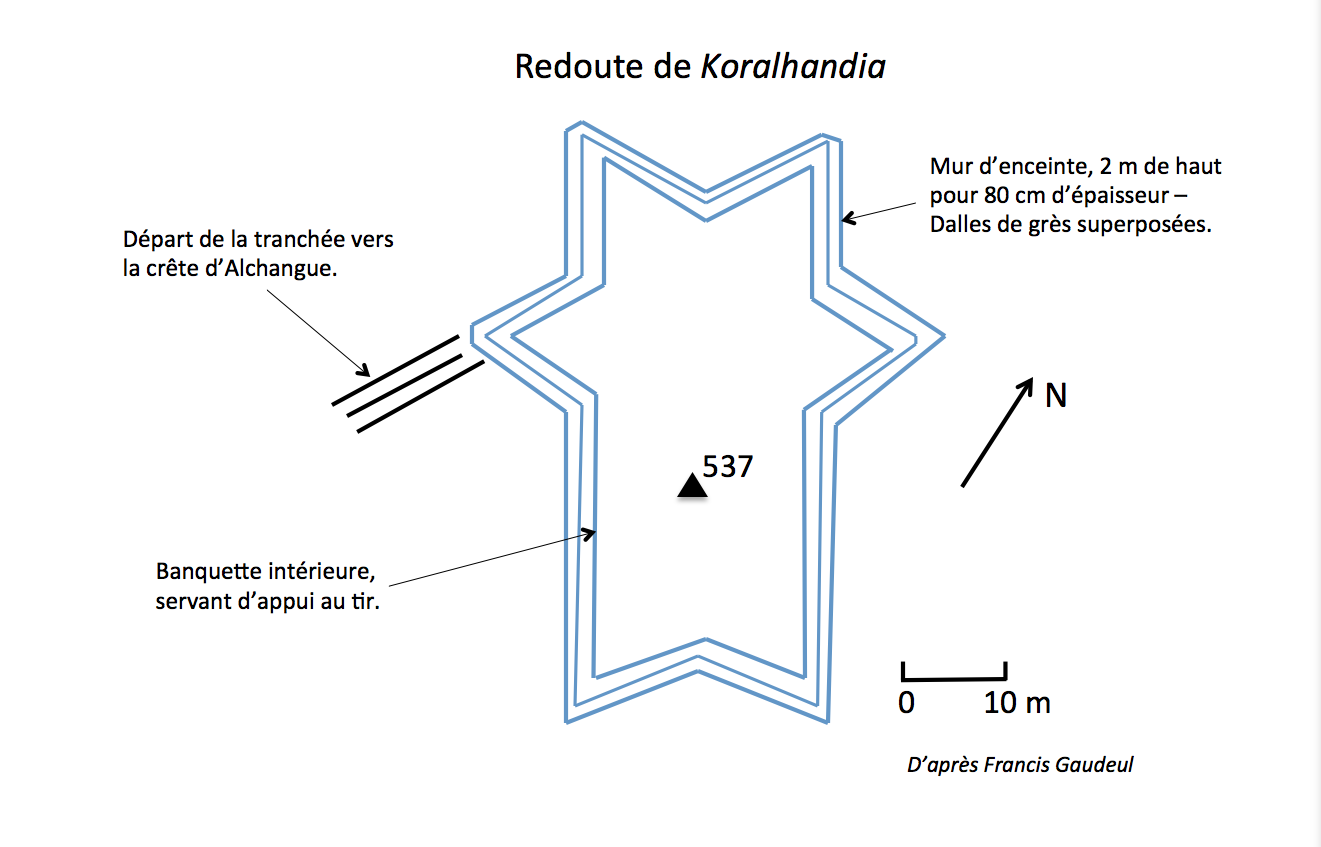
The star-shaped redoubt at Koralhandia.

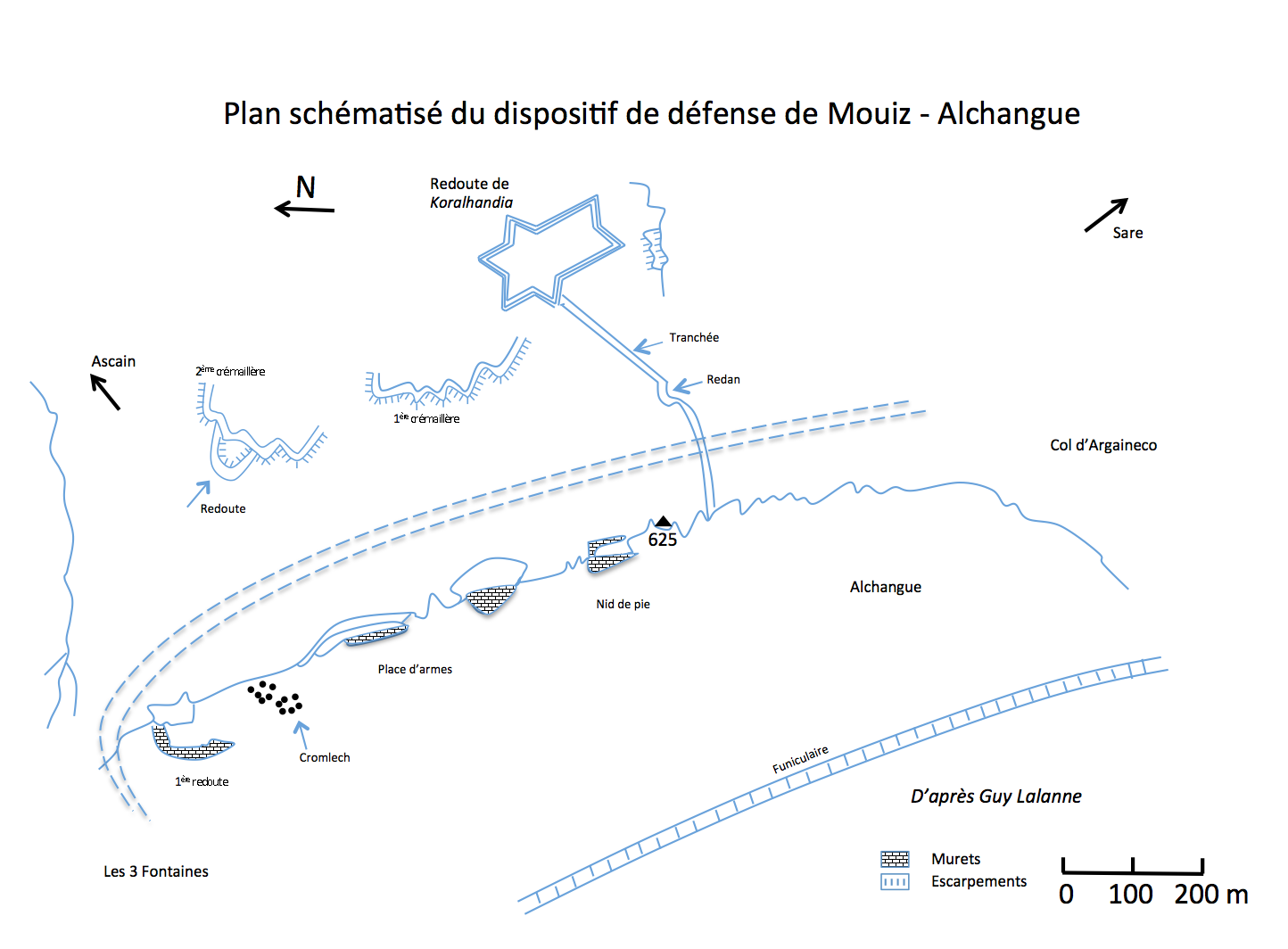
Schematic plan of the Mouiz - Alchangue defense system.

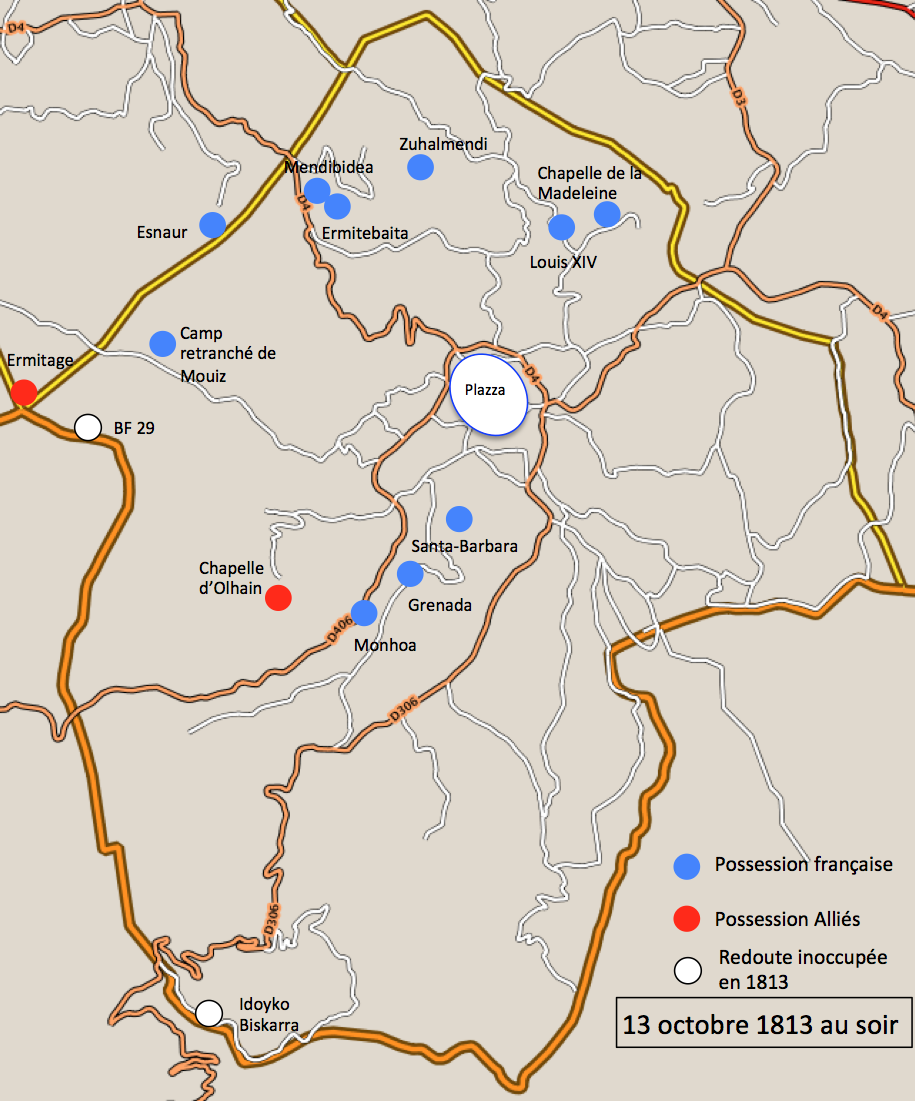
The respective positions of the French and Allies around the Saratar lock on the evening of October 13, 1813, prior to Wellington's decisive offensive on November 10.

The Mouiz camp, also known as Koralhandia, meaning "grand enclosure," was constructed in 1813 and represents the most significant component of the defensive system. The fort is situated on the northern slopes of the Larrun massif, at the location designated as Aira-herri, at an elevation of 537 meters. It is located approximately 800 meters northeast of the Trois-Fontaines railway station on the Larrun railway and 1,400 meters southwest of the Saint-Ignace pass. The strategic position was selected to safeguard the access to the Saint-Ignace pass and the village of Sare from an adversary approaching from the west or southwest. Although the redoubt is situated within the boundaries of Sare, the western extremity of the Alchangue ridge, colloquially designated Petite Larrun by military authorities, is depicted on the Ascain cadastre.

The redoubt, constructed using superimposed sandstone slabs without the addition of cement, exhibits a six-pointed star shape, rendering it particularly suited for short-range flanking fire. The structure covers an area of 1,040 square meters and is enclosed by a wall that does not contain loopholes. This wall rises to a height of two meters with a thickness of 80 centimeters. A trench measuring approximately 400 meters in length and constructed in a zigzag configuration connects the redoubt to Alchango-Harriak, (Note: In the field of military architecture, a redan is defined as a recessed section of a fortification wall, forming a salient angle and providing a defensive position for the protection of a passageway.) a fortified ridge situated 500 meters to the southwest. This ridge extends from the Argaïneko pass to the Trois Fontaines pass and reaches an elevation of 625 meters. (Note: Lalanne 1991, p. 373) Four infantry posts have been established along the ridge. The fortification is equipped with six artillery pieces.

[…] everywhere, the rocks are connected by stone walls, and the crevices are used to house squads and sections. Exposed to the cold and storms of the late season, violent at such heights, these unfortunate men had to cover themselves. Hence, a luxury of works, moreover easy to erect, as the rock was on-site and crumbled into thin slabs […] (Note: Antz 1993, p. 331: Charles Clerc, quoted by Jacques Antz)

— Charles Clerc, cited by Jacques Antz, Sare, 1993, p. 331.

The work, with a perimeter of 1,460 meters, including 1,040 meters of dry stone walls, has been included on the Ministry of Culture's list of protected cultural heritage sites since November 4, 1986.

On November 10, 1813, Kempf's brigades of the 43rd Allied Regiment and Colborne's of the 17th Portuguese Regiment initiated an assault on the Mouiz camp from the ridge, while another Portuguese battalion advanced directly on the fortification. The French defenders engaged in a desperate battle, utilizing their remaining ammunition and strength, and resorting to the use of stones and rocks during the Allies' final assault. (Note: Lalanne 1991, p. 378)

The northern redoubts of Sare listed as Historical Monuments

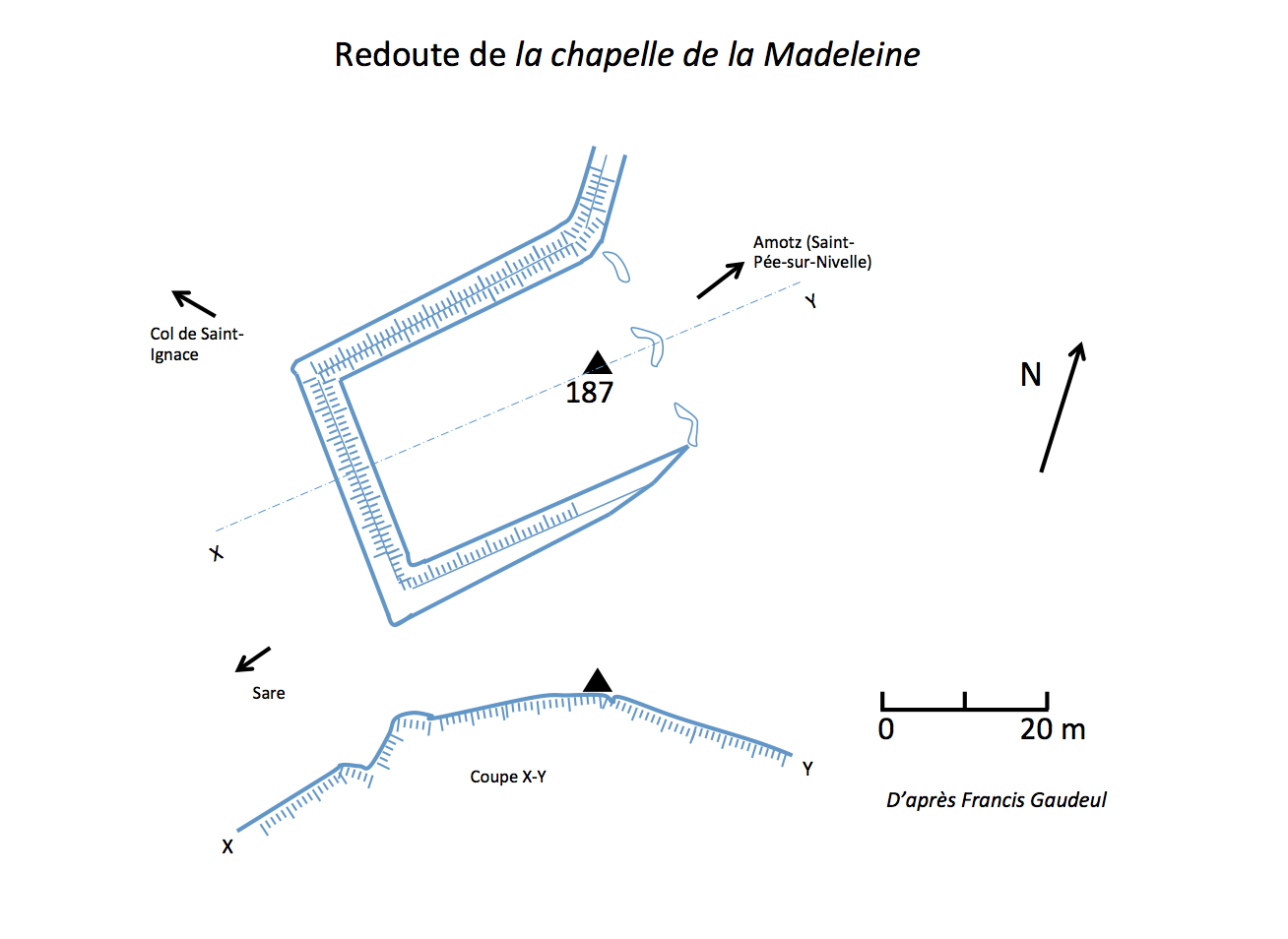
The Madeleine chapel redoubt.

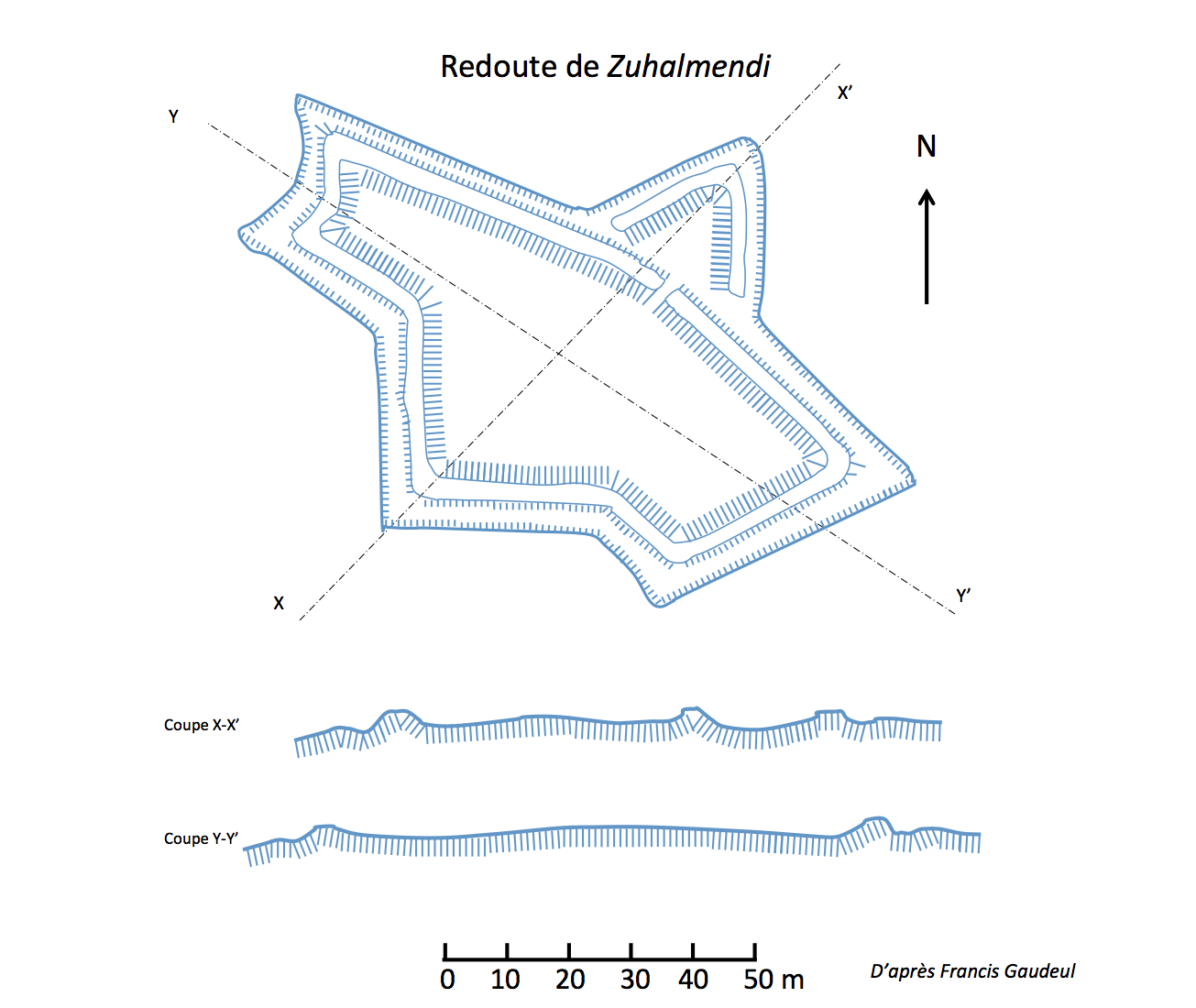
Zuhalmendi Redoubt.

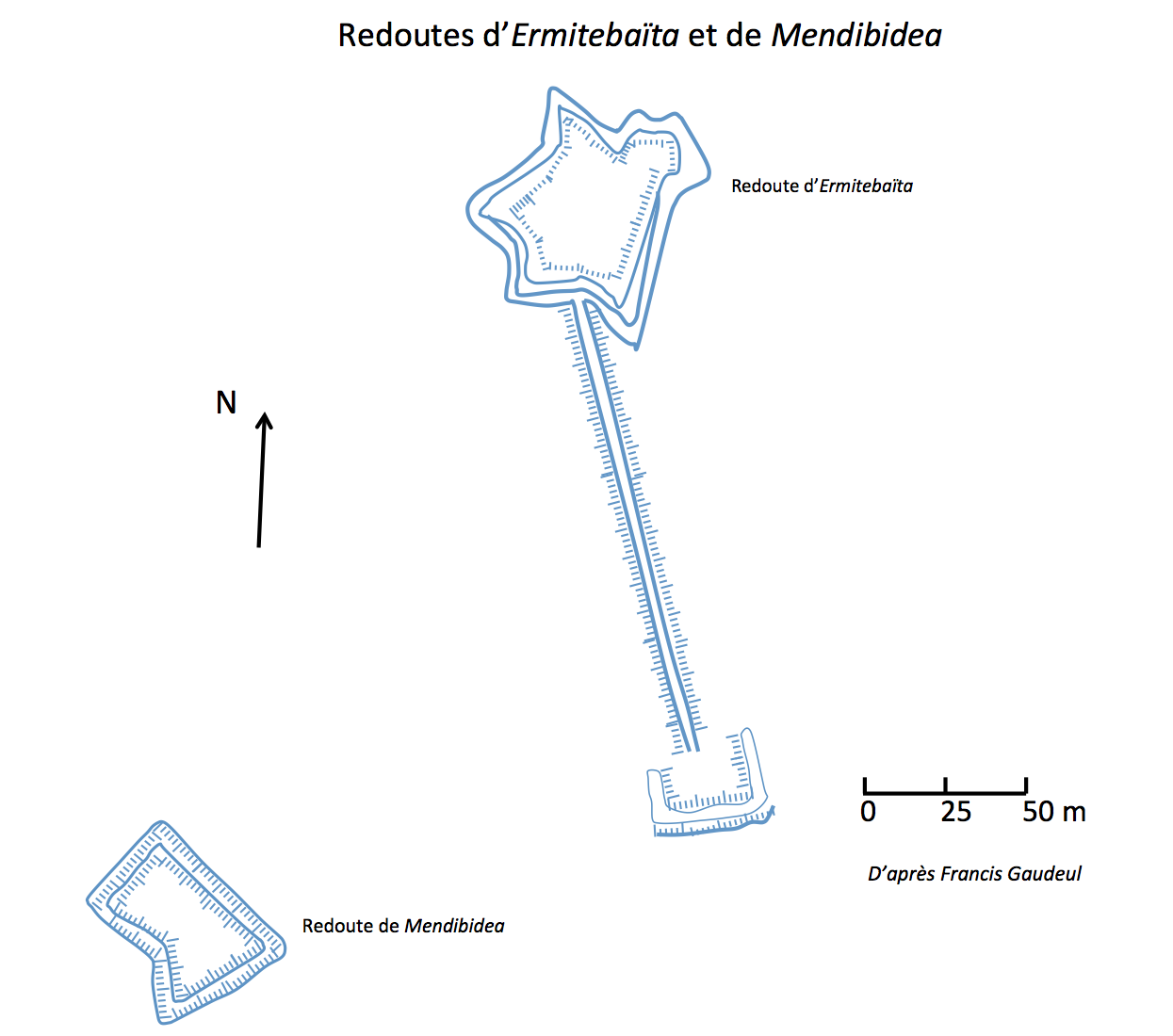
Ermitebaita and Mendibidea Redoubts

The Chapel of La Madeleine is a fortified structure situated to the northeast of Sare, in the vicinity of the Amotz district of Saint-Pée-sur-Nivelle. The structure reaches an elevation of 187 meters and is constructed in a quadrilateral formation, with three sides protected by a deep ditch. The side facing Amotz is defended by several smaller defensive structures. The Uhaldekoborda trench extends for nearly 500 meters in an eastward direction, reaching a length of 250 meters. It is protected by a 60-meter-high parapet. (Note: Antz 2006, p. 216)

On November 10, 1813, the front formed by the redoubt of the Chapel of La Madeleine and that of Louis XIV was overrun following two unsuccessful assaults by two Anglo-Portuguese divisions. This redoubt has been listed since 1993.

The Zuhalmeni Redoubt, also known as Zuhalmeni or Souhameni, and the Signal Redoubt, is situated to the northwest of the town, close to the Mendionde pass, at an elevation of 301 meters. The star-shaped work has dimensions of 115 by 85 meters, with a perimeter of 310 meters. It is protected by a deep ditch that renders it impassable to attackers. (Note: Antz 2006, p. 214) The work, defended by 350 seasoned soldiers of the 88th Line Regiment, endured five successive assaults before surrendering. This surrender was obtained by the English colonel, who came to negotiate with the regiment's commander, convincing him of the futility of resistance in the face of the Allies' advance. In the course of the battle, two hundred English soldiers were killed for the loss of a single French defender.

[…] The French left this redoubt with dignity and paraded before the English troops who honored them […] (Note: Antz 1993, p. 346)

— Jacques Antz, Sare, 1993, p. 346.

The entire site has been listed since 1992.

The two fortifications of Ermitebaïta and Mendibidea, which are mutually supportive, comprise a system that affords extensive views of the positions of attackers emerging from the ravine extending from the Saint-Ignace pass to the Mendiondo pass. Additionally, the system is designed to safeguard the access to the ridge safeguarded by the Zuhalmendi redoubt. The Ermitebaïta redoubt has a commanding view of the Saint-Ignace pass. It is situated at an altitude of 268 meters, two kilometers northeast of the summit of the Larrun (Note: Antz 2006, p. 210) and 750 meters southwest of the Zuhalmendi redoubt. The fortification is star-shaped, with a perimeter of 185 meters, situated within a quadrilateral measuring 90 meters by 75 meters. It is surrounded by a parapet and a four-meter-wide ditch. A trench connects it to a "U"-shaped outpost defending the pass. In 1813, the young recruits stationed there abandoned the fort without a fight after the evacuation of the Louis XIV redoubt. It has been listed as a historic monument since 1992.

The Mendibidea redoubt, situated 250 meters from Ermitebaïta, encompasses the western aspect of the Saint-Ignace pass. The structure's perimeter measures 152 meters. Similarly, the Mendibidea redoubt was vacated by the 70th Line Battalion, comprising inexperienced recruits, following the evacuation of the Louis XIV redoubt due to the advance of the Spanish divisions of Longa and Freyre. Despite General Taupin's endeavors, the battalion could not be reassembled. (Note: Lalanne 1991, p. 372) The structure, which has retained a high degree of integrity, has been designated a historic monument since 1992, along with that of Ermitebaïta.

The southern redoubts of Sare listed as Historical Monuments

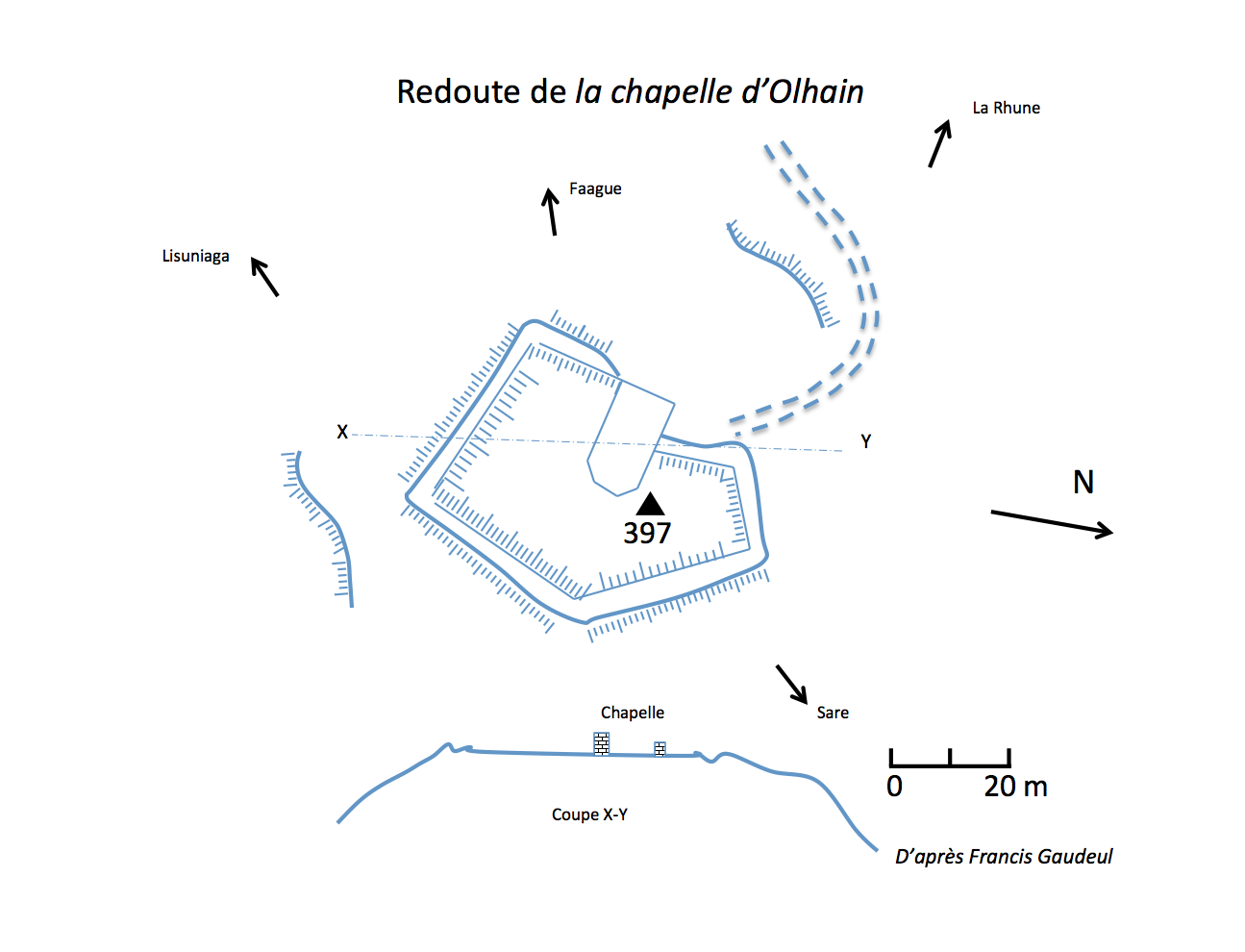
Olhain chapel redoubt.

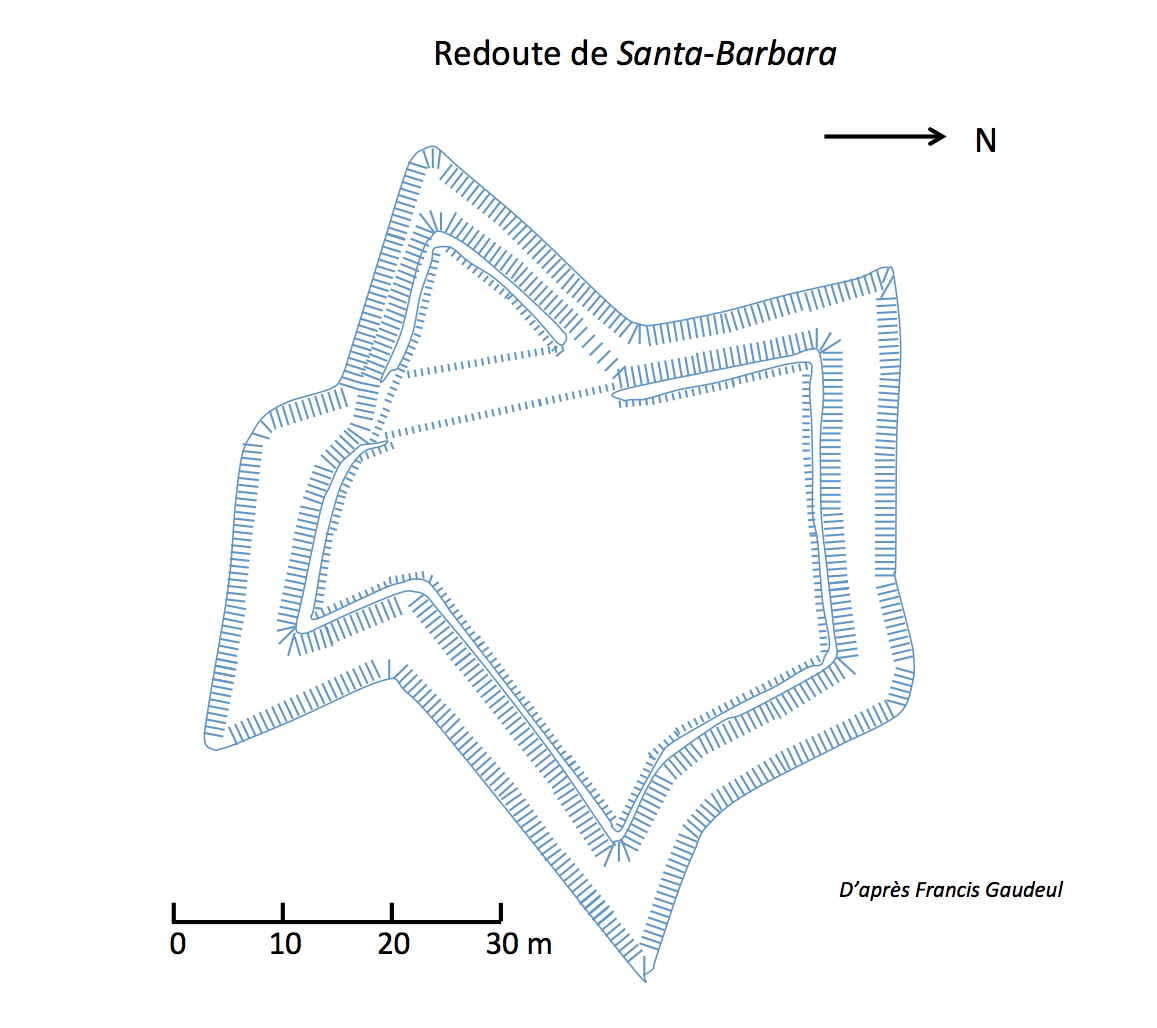
Santa-Barbara Redoubt.

The chapel of Olhain is situated at an elevation of 397 meters on a hilltop overlooking the road from Sare to Vera de Bidassoa. The redoubt is an irregular pentagon, with the two largest sides measuring 25 meters. One side, oriented towards the Larrun, encompasses the chapel and is supported by two opposing lateral walls. (Note: Lalanne 1991, p. 379) During the battles of October 7 and 8, 1813, Wellington seized the redoubt before launching an offensive on the hermitage. The structure has been listed since 1992.

The Santa-Barbara Redoubt is situated at an altitude of 137 meters in the Lehenbiscay district. It is located on the hill of Santa Barbara, on the edge of the plateau overlooking the Lizuniaga stream, 1,500 meters south of the church of Sare. (Note: Gaudeul 1984, p. 249) The structure has a star shape and is protected by a ditch ranging in width from 4.60 to 6.50 meters, which is doubled inside by a 180-meter-long parapet. (Note: Lalanne 1991, p. 376) It is inscribed within an 80-meter-square quadrilateral and appears to be part of a larger defensive ensemble, of which it constitutes the main part. The structure has been listed since 1993.

During the Western Pyrenees campaign (1793-1795), the position was defended by Théophile de la Tour d'Auvergne, who was known as "First Grenadier of the Republic." The redoubt was destroyed in 1795 but subsequently rebuilt in 1813. (Note: Antz 2006, p. 206) During the battles that took place between October 7 and 13 of that year, (Note: "…on October 8, it was abandoned by its defenders the day after Wellington's offensive and occupied by the Spaniards. The French retook it at dawn the next day after a counterattack but lost it again at 10 o'clock. On October 12, Clausel's troops (3 battalions of General Conroux's division) attacked it at night on Soult's order, who wanted to retake this position because of its dominant situation relative to the village of Sare. This operation was successful and caused significant losses to the surprised enemy, who left several hundred prisoners in our hands. The next morning at dawn, the Hispano-English troops (5 Spanish battalions and an English brigade) attacked in turn: they were repulsed. Santa Barbara remained in French hands, and Wellington did not insist.") the redoubt changed hands several times. Wellington's troops ultimately secured it on November 10, at the cost of 500 combat-ready men, in comparison to 200 imperial soldiers.

Other redoubts in Sare (Selection)

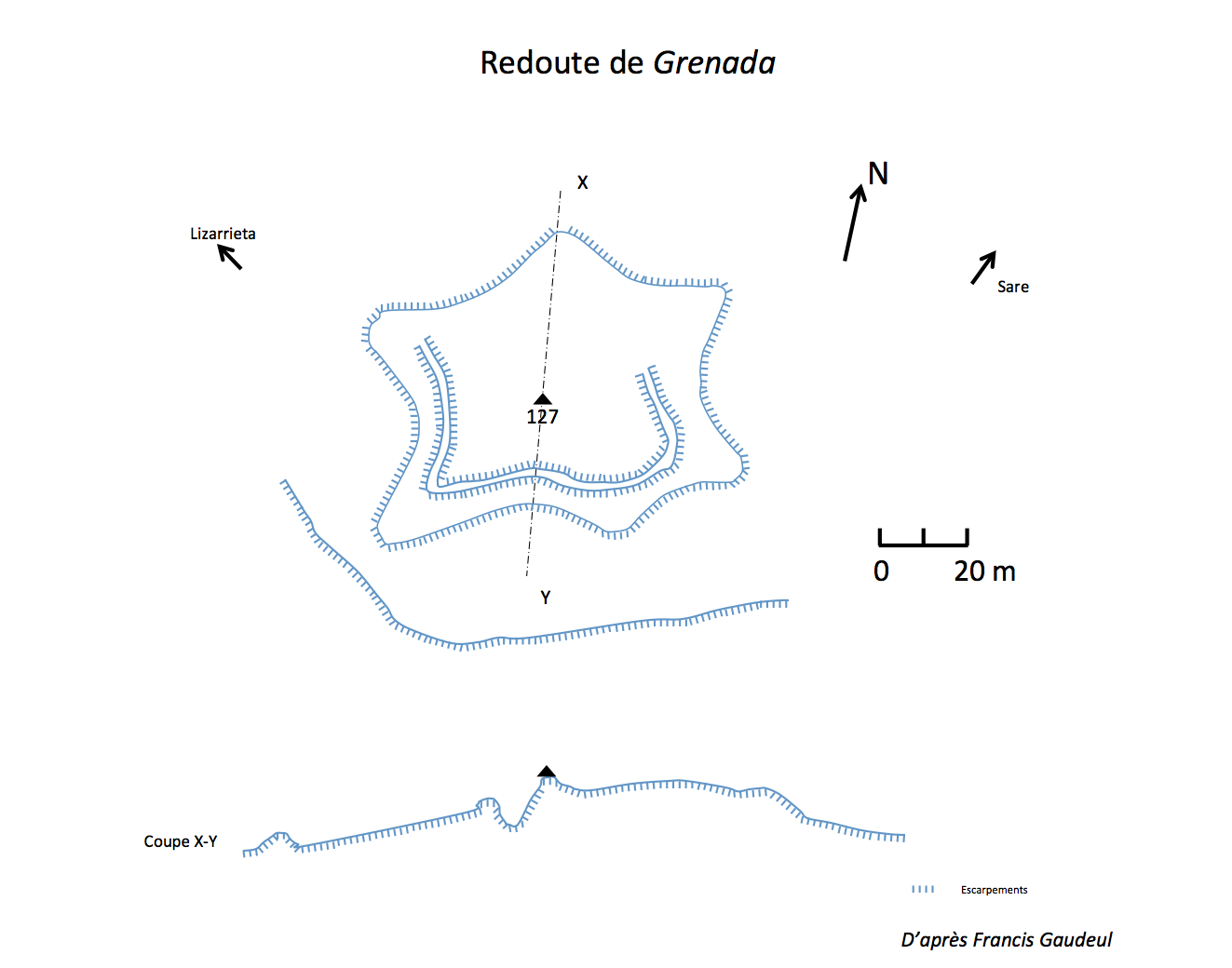
Grenada or Chelkor Redoubt.

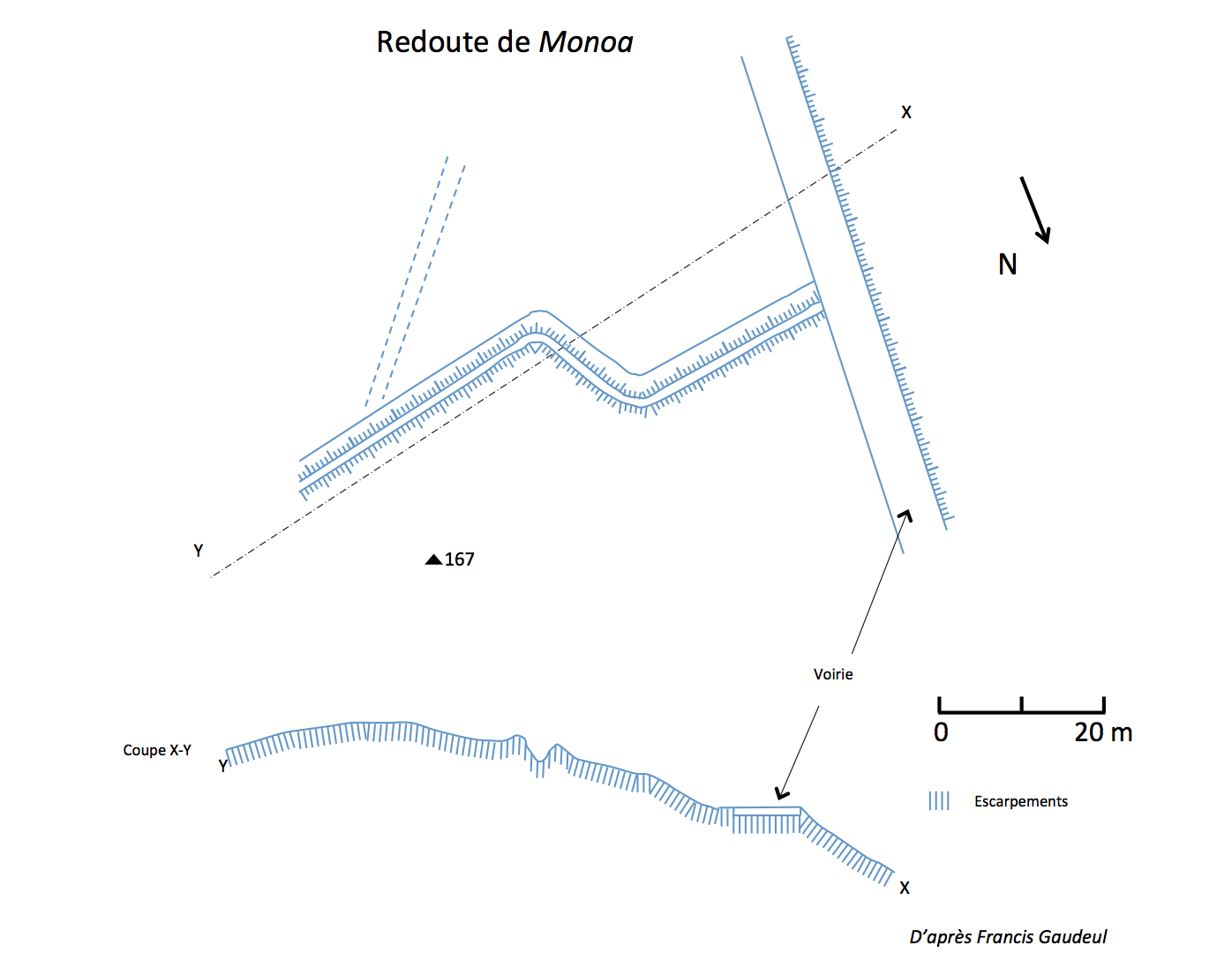
Monoa Redoubt.

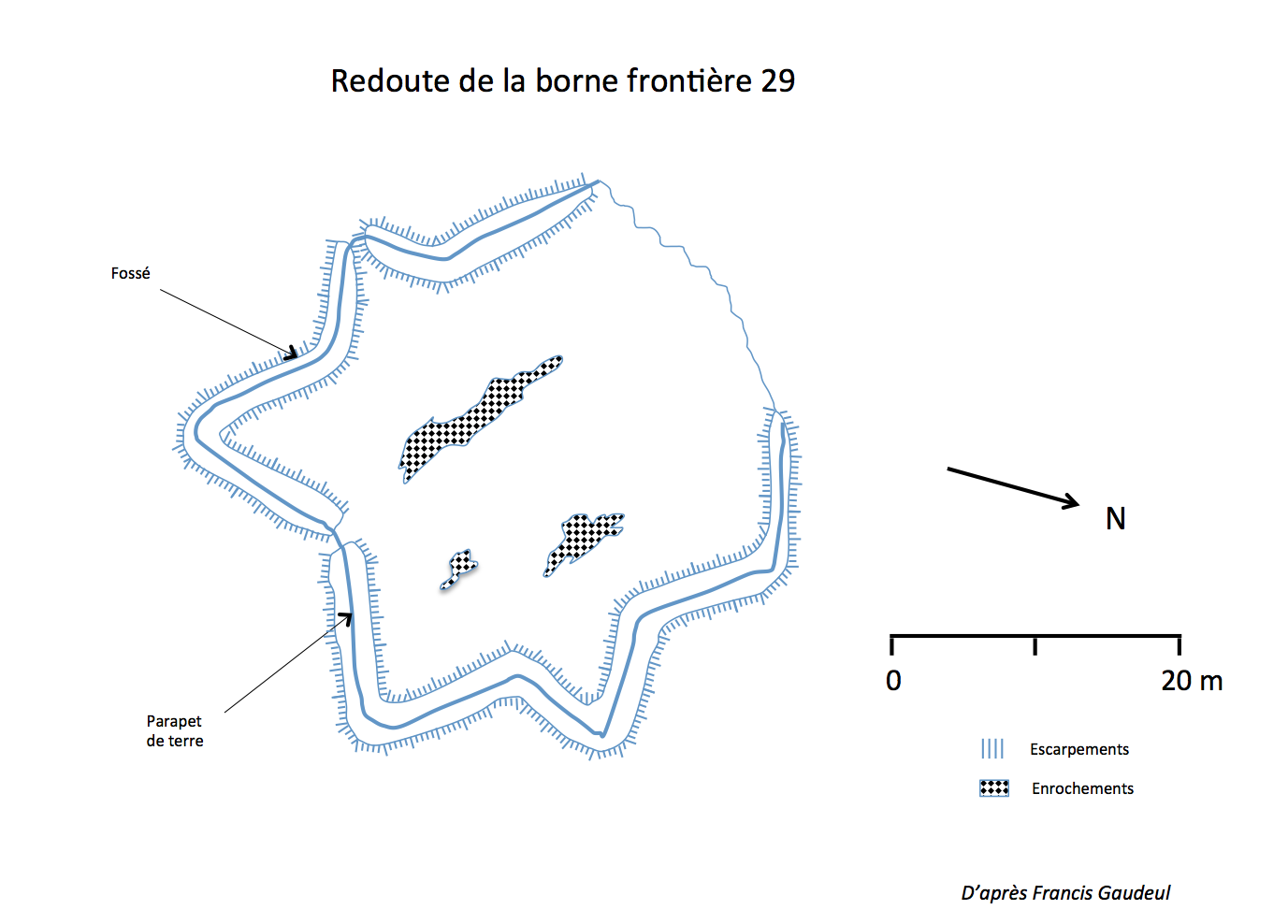
Frontier marker redoubt 29.

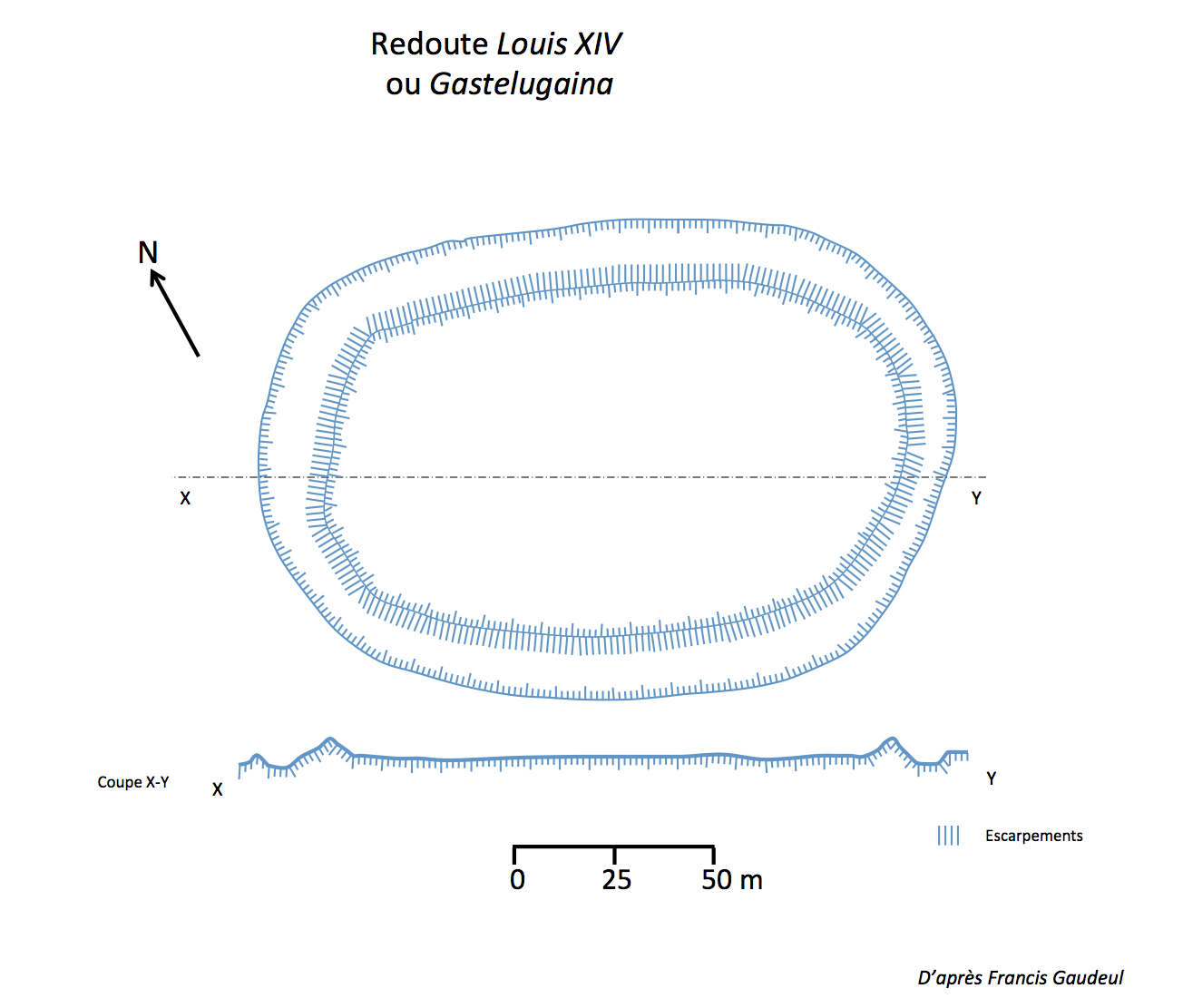
Louis XIV Redoubt.

The Grenada Redoubt, also known as Chelkor, is situated on the territory of Sare. It is positioned at an elevation of 127 meters and overlooks the road leading to the Lizarrieta pass from the summit of a hill. The structure is a six-pointed star-shaped work with a perimeter of 80 meters, surrounded by a ditch measuring between 1.5 and 2 meters in width. The inner parapet of the star is doubled on its southern part by a 50-centimeter ditch. (Note: Lalanne 1991, p. 377) During the 1813 battles, the redoubt offered significant resistance to Allied troops; however, it ultimately succumbed to the combined assault of a British horse battery and a Portuguese infantry brigade. (Note: Antz 2006, p. 208)

The Monhoa Redoubt, also known as Monhoa or Monhohandi, is situated in Sare and serves as an outpost for the Santa-Barbara and Grenada redoubts on the route connecting the Lizarrieta pass to the Lizuniaga pass. It is located at an altitude of 167 meters and only a Z-shaped ditch remains, with the absence of remains on either side suggesting that it was only a half-redoubt.

Similarly, the redoubt of boundary marker 29, also designated as Bechini, is situated on a plateau at an elevation of 600 meters, at the base of the Larrun summit. The structure forms a star shape, protected by a ditch measuring 50 centimeters in depth and an earth parapet. It is situated adjacent to a dry stone barn to the southwest. Historical research has demonstrated that it was the site of considerable combat during the wars of 1793–1794. (Note: Antz 1993, p. 343)

The Louis XIV Redoubt, also known as Mendiondo or Gastelugaina, has been lost to history since 1977, except for a fragment of rampart into which the current water tower is embedded. According to General Francis Gaudeul, it is a protohistoric enclosure that was adapted for the needs of the 19th-century wars. It was also used during the 1793-1794 battles against Spanish troops.

[…] The enclosure known as the Louis XIV redoubt belonged to the type with earth parapets; its plan was in the form of an ellipse, with maximum dimensions of about 165 meters for the major axis and 110 meters for the minor axis. Its protection was ensured by a ditch and a parapet […] (Note: Antz 1993, p. 338: Francis Gaudeul, quoted by Jacques Antz)

— Francis Gaudeul, cited by Jacques Antz, Sare, 1993, p. 338.

The elliptical shape is a relatively uncommon feature among modern-era fortifications, which may be attributed to the protohistoric origins of the structure in question.

On November 10, 1813, the troops under the command of General Maransin, protected by the forces of Barbot to the east and those of General Rouget to the west successfully repelled two assaults. With the withdrawal of Conroux's division to the left, the redoubt was captured by the Allied forces, resulting in the loss of three officers and 179 soldiers for the French. General Maransin, who had been temporarily taken captive by the attackers, managed to escape and subsequently resumed command of his division.

The Idoyko Biskarra Redoubt is situated at the border between Spain and France, in proximity to boundary marker 43. It is positioned at the summit of a hill, at an altitude of 502 meters, 300 meters from the Lizarrieta pass. The structure is ovoid and oriented towards French territory, and historical evidence suggests that it was utilized during the 1793-1794 battles. (Note: Antz 1993, p. 349)

== The redoubts of Urrugne ==
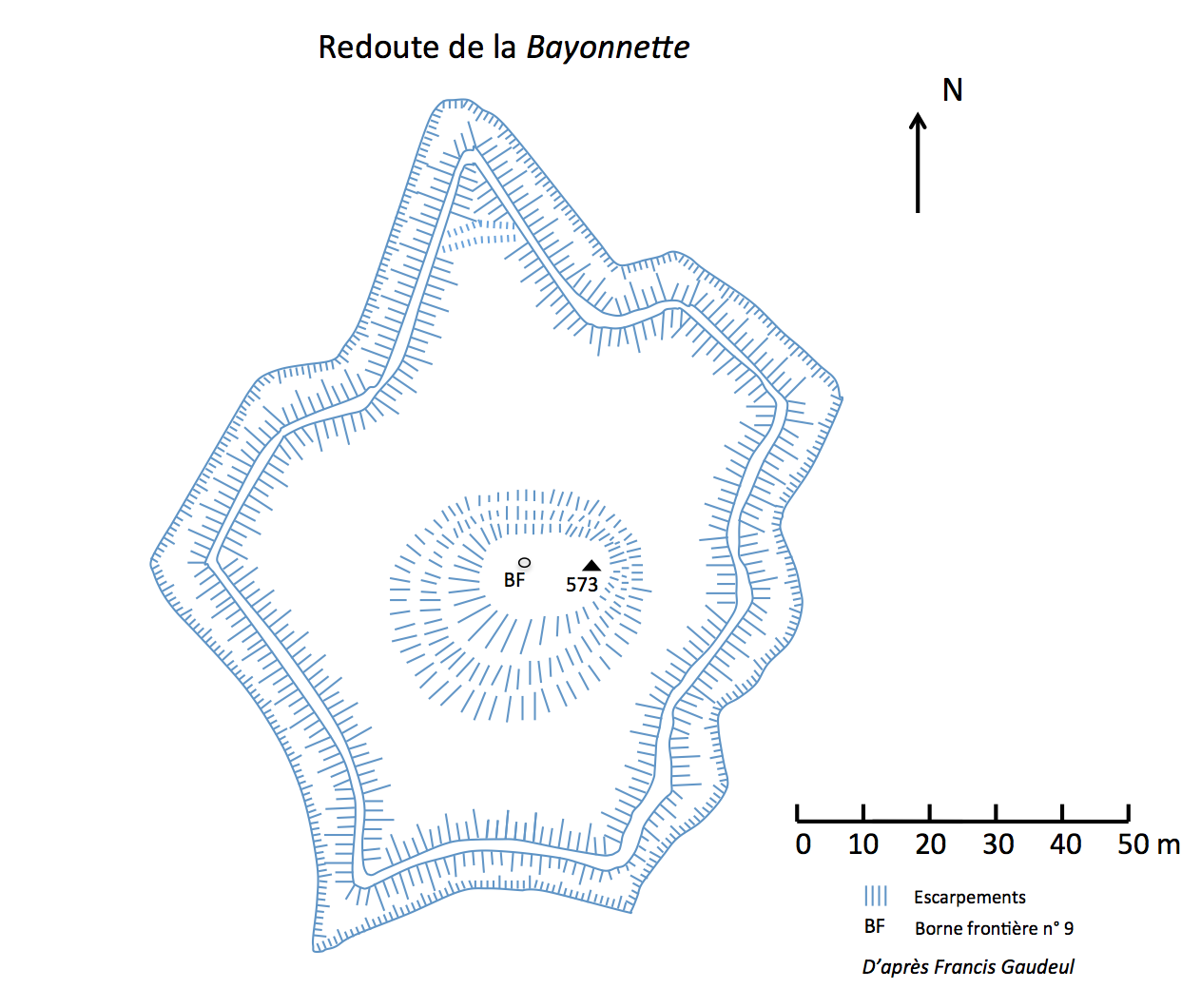
The Bayonnette Redoubt.

The Bayonnette Redoubt is located at an altitude of 560 meters at the summit of Mendalé. (Note: Lalanne 1989, p. 146) It has a view of the village of Vera de Bidassoa.

[…] it develops around the 573 mark and the border marker 9. Its plan, with a very irregular polygonal shape, closely follows the terrain's relief to provide defenders with the best possibilities for shooting and flanking [...] (Note: Lalanne 1989, p. 148: Francis Gaudeul, quoted by Guy Lalanne)

— Francis Gaudeul, Urrugne, 1989, p. 148.

The parapet surrounding the structure measures 350 meters in length. Before its arrival, a ditch 7 meters in width and 1.5 to 2 meters in depth awaits. The structure has a maximum length of 127 meters from north to south and 107 meters from south-southwest to north-northeast. The mound rising at its center is of a truncated cone shape, measuring 3 to 5 meters in height, with a base circumference of nearly 110 meters and a diameter of 20 meters at the top. (Note: Gaudeul 1984, p. 244)

The site saw action during the conflicts of 1793-1794 and 1813. It acquired its designation as the "Bayonnette Redoubt" as a result of the French bayonet charge against the Spaniards, which commenced on July 24, 1794, (Note: Lalanne 1989, p. 148) intending to reclaim the position that had been lost on May 2, 1793.

It was restored in September 1813 and defended by the 9th Light Battalion, from Taupin's division, part of Clausel's army corps. It was attacked by the Allies on October 7. (Note: Gaudeul 1984, p. 246) On October 8, 1813, the battalion of the 88th Infantry Regiment, under the command of Battalion Chief Gillet, resisted the English assaults for a long time before being massacred. General Van der Maësen, who died while trying to clear the bridge at Vera de Bidassoa, was temporarily buried there before being subsequently interred at the Ascain cemetery.

The Redoubt and the Bortuste Redoubt have been designated as historic monuments since 1992.

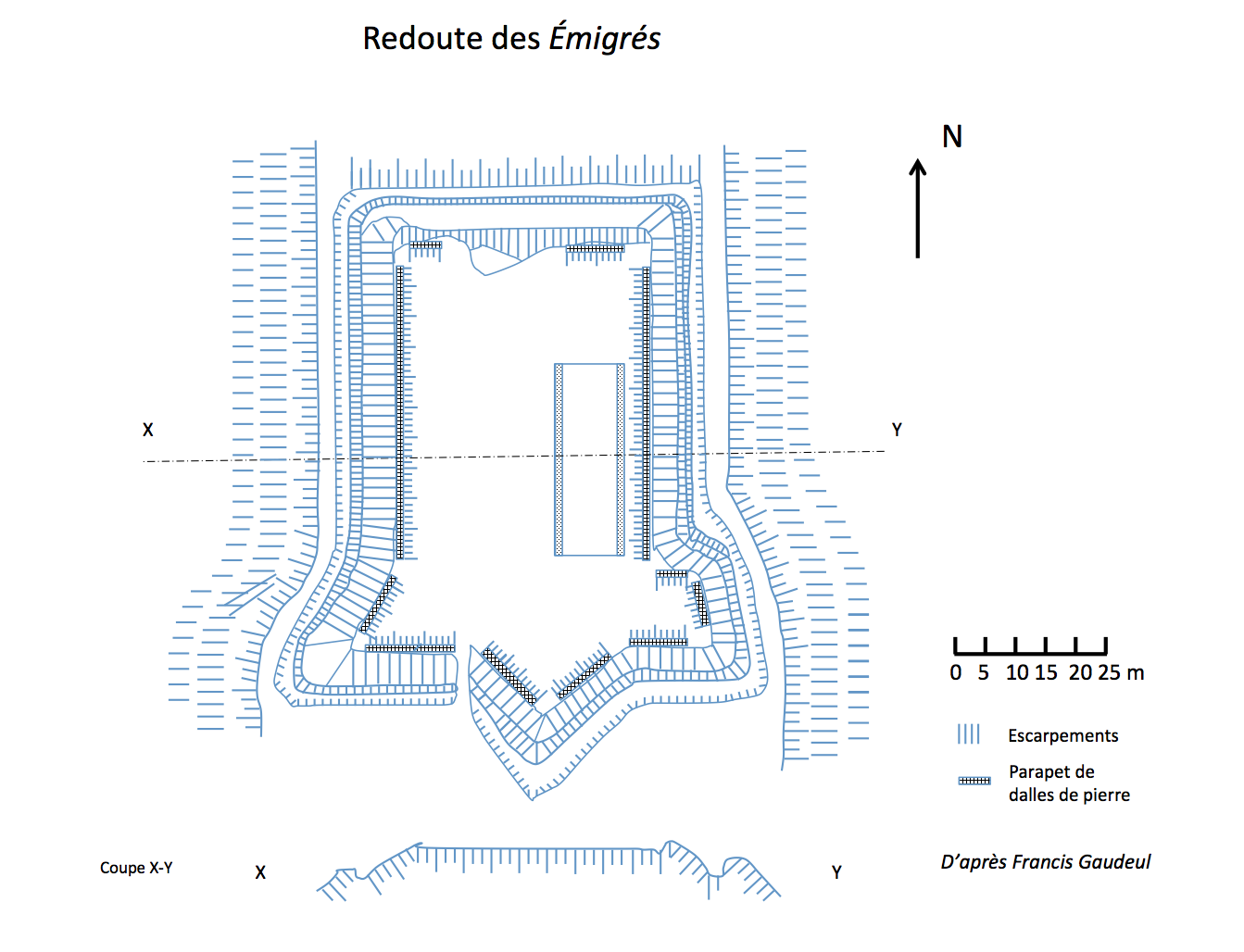
Émigrés Redoubt.

The Emigrés Redoubt is situated at an elevation of 394 meters, overlooking the Ibardin pass. It is positioned on a ridge that runs parallel to the CD 404 road, which connects the pass to the former Herboure customs.

[…] it is a very fine, well-preserved work, distinguished […] by the simplicity and regularity of its plan. This includes a rectangular platform measuring 54 x 43 meters to the north; to the south, three bastions ensure the flanking of the south facade of the structure and its east and west faces.

— Guy Lalanne, Urrugne, 1989, p. 148.

The structure, which appears to have been named in error due to the emigrants' camp erected on the other side of the border, (Note: Lalanne 1989, p. 150) has been listed since 1992. It is noteworthy that the entrance is located to the south, where the parapet covered with stone slabs creates a chicane to repel attackers to the east. The redoubt occupies a quadrilateral of 58 by 70 meters.

The battles of 1793 left little documentation. The redoubt appears to have been captured by the Spaniards on May 2, 1793, and subsequently recaptured by the French in July 1794. In October 1813, given the low density of the French defensive system, the redoubt seems to have been taken by attackers emerging from the wooded ravines surrounding it.

Officers involved in the conquest and defense of the Louis XIV redoubt (Selection)

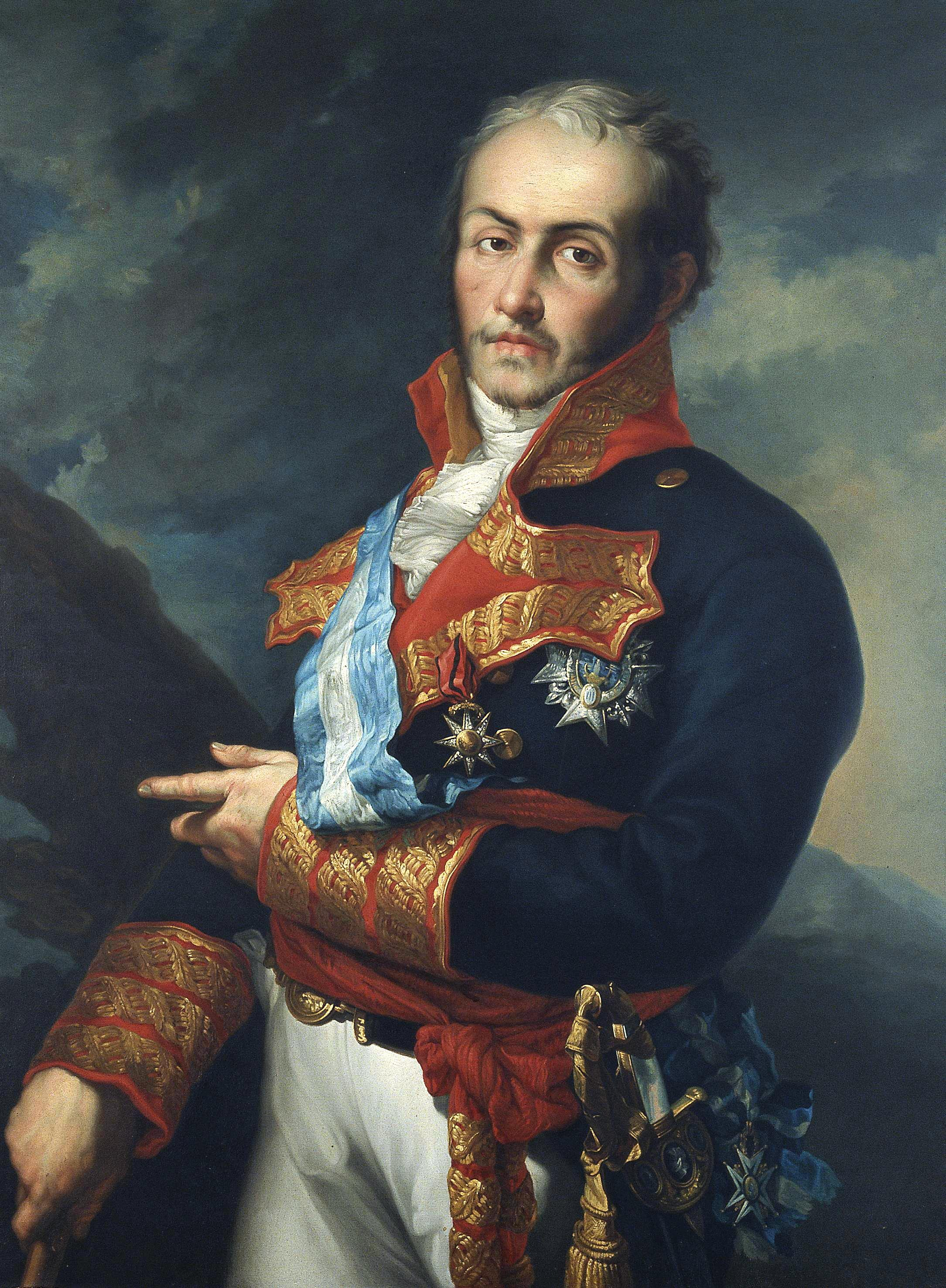
Spanish general Caro.

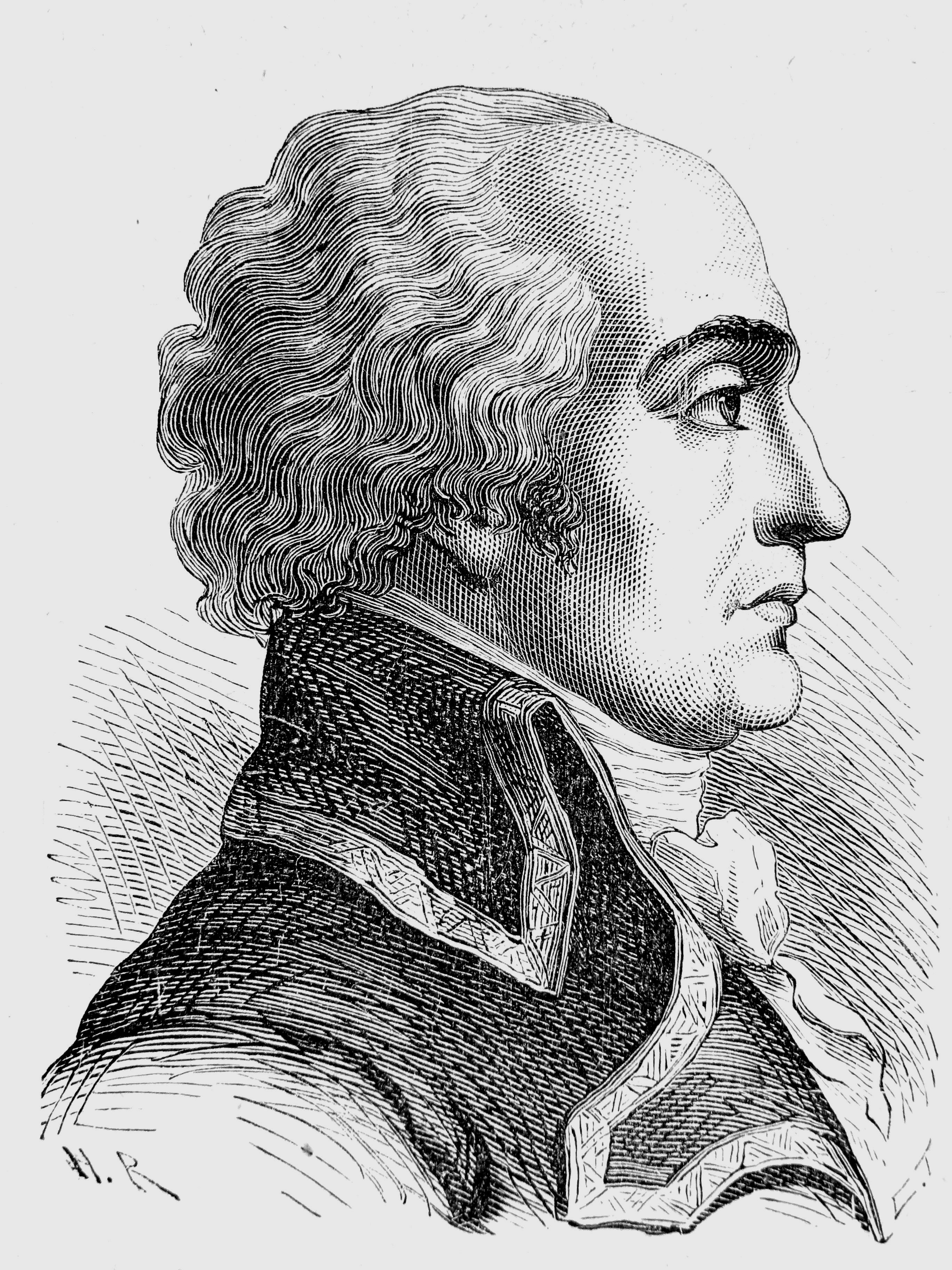
French general Joseph Servan.

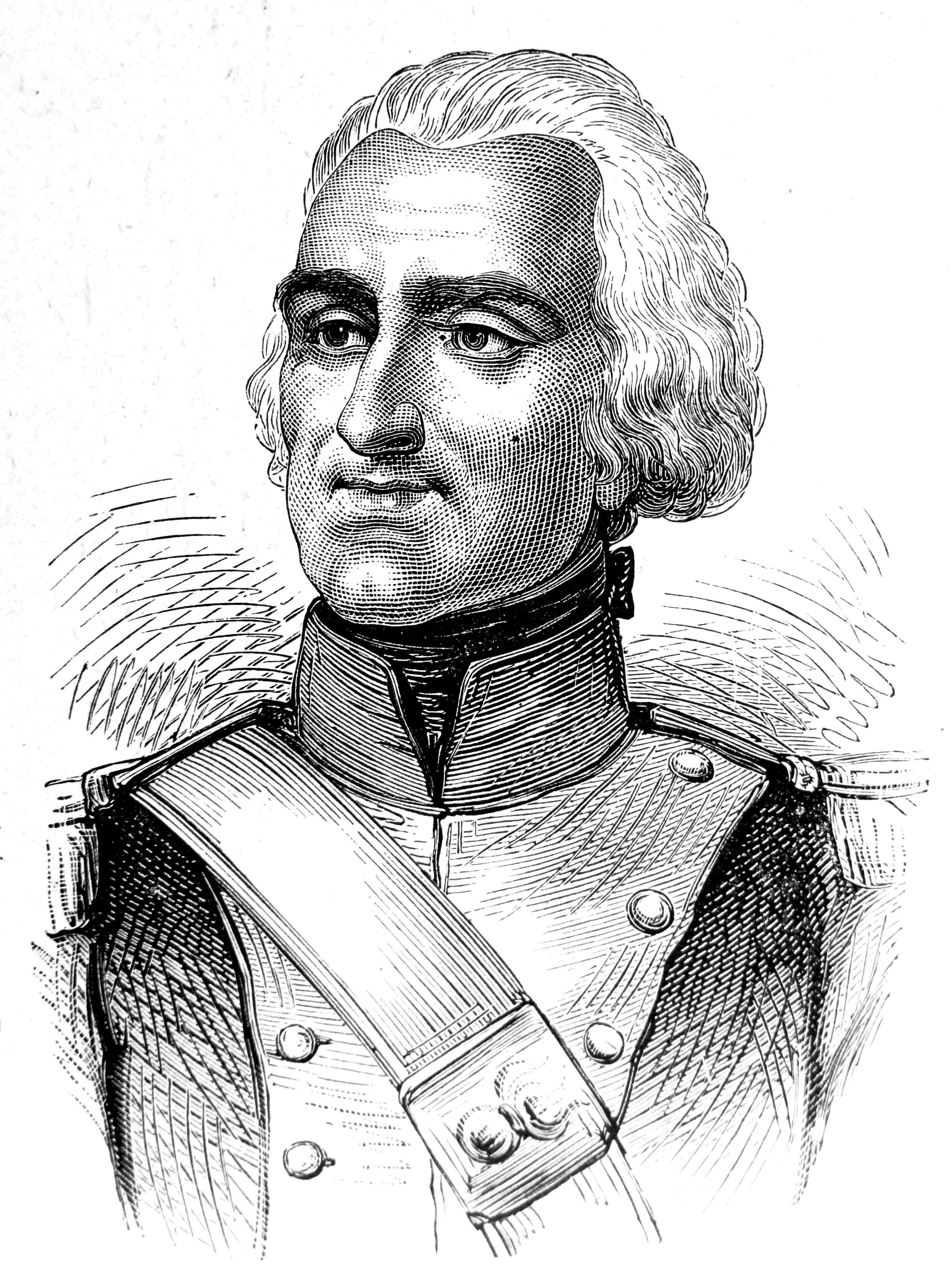
La Tour d'Auvergne, first brigadier of France.

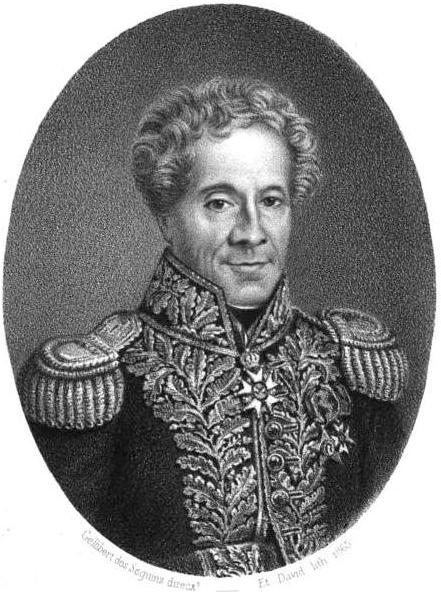
French general Pinoteau

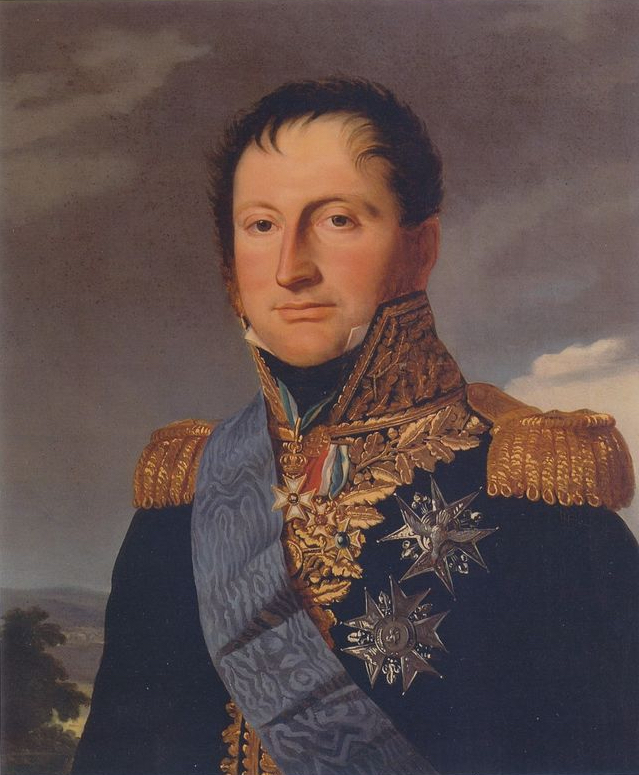
French general Honoré Charles Reille.

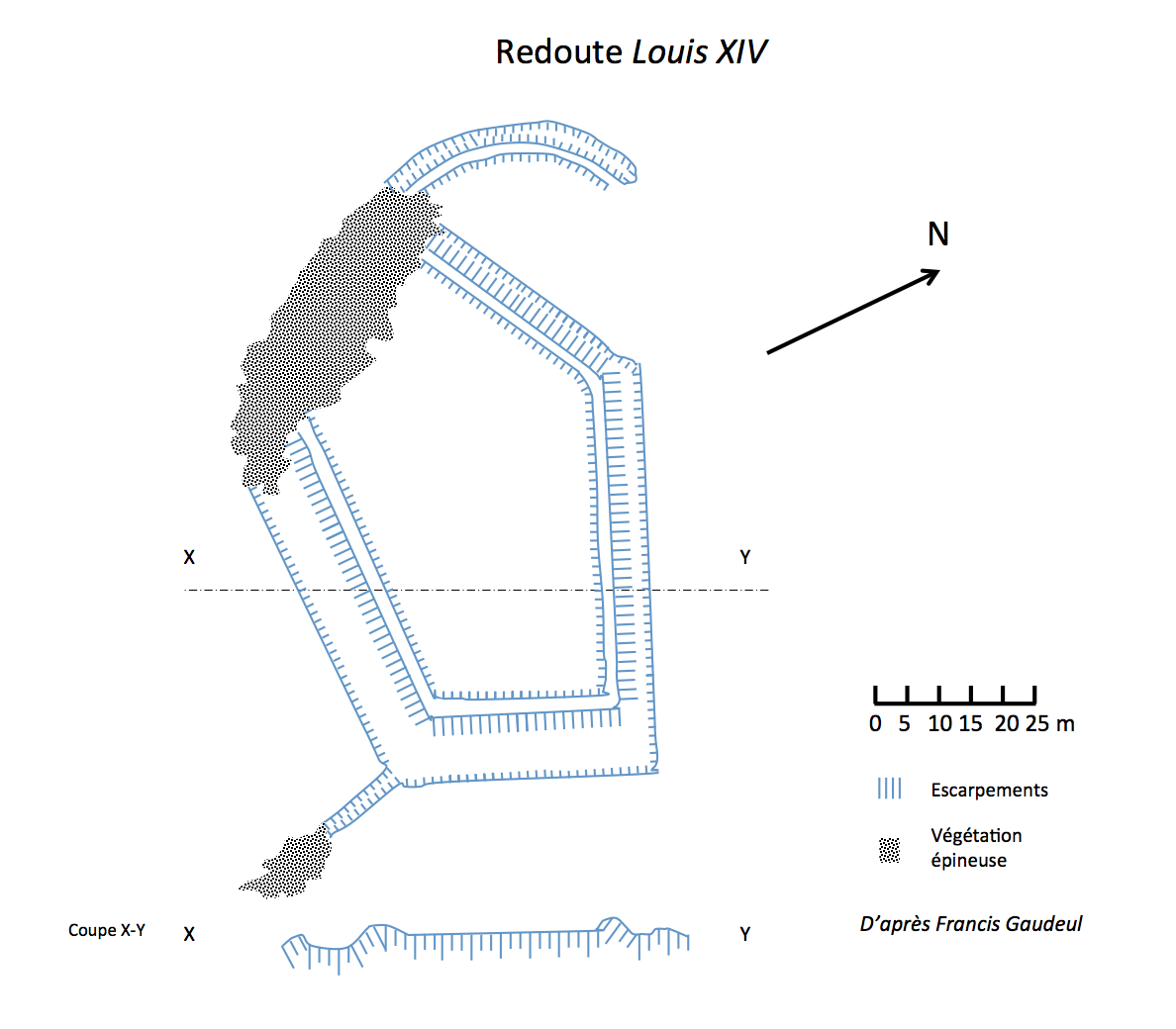
Louis XIV Redoubt.

The Louis XIV Redoubt is a distinct structure from that of Sare, which has already been described. It extends over the communes of Urrugne and Biriatou at the 124th meridian. The structure overlooks the Bidassoa and allows a view of Pheasant Island, situated 1 km to the west. (Note: Lalanne 1989, p. 145) It was named the Louis XIV Redoubt in memory of the conference held on this island in 1659. (Note: Gaudeul 1984, p. 242) It has been listed as a historic monument since 1997.

[…] the redoubt has the shape of an irregular pentagon, its southwest side, which overlooks the quarry and the Bidassoa, is buried in a thick mass of thorny vegetation; the other four sides are well preserved and visible. The central part of the structure is dominated by a continuous parapet preceded by a ditch whose width varies from 5 to 7 meters; the parapet rises 1.50 to 1.60 meters above the ditch's bottom. The length of the scarp is between 3.50 and 5 meters. The perimeter, measured at the top of the parapet, is close to 1.80 meters. The maximum dimensions are 60 meters from south to north and 90 meters from west to east. Facing the Bidassoa, the rampart was extended northward by a 40-meter-long crescent of earth. The eastern part of the structure is covered, facing east and north, by a low-relief L-shaped rampart probably unfinished, 75 meters long.

— Francis Gaudeul, quoted by Guy Lalanne, Urrugne, 1989, p. 146.

On April 23, 1793, the Redoubt, which was defended by French troops, was attacked and subsequently captured by General Caro's troops. On June 26, the troops of General Servan, led by La Tour d’Auvergne, recaptured the redoubt. Further battles took place on July 23 of the same year, during which the Spaniards seized the redoubt, which they were forced to relinquish on January 14, 1794. Despite renewed assaults by General Caro on February 5, the French maintained control of the structure.

In the context of the 1813 battles, to launch an attack on 31 August towards San Marcial, Marshal Soult established his command post in this same redoubt in advance of the aforementioned attack. On October 7, while the fortification was under the protection of the 15th Line Regiment of the Pinoteau brigade, which was under the command of General Reille, the redoubt was subjected to a sudden and intense assault by the troops of Wellington. The French forces were compelled to relinquish their position to the Allied troops and retreat to the Croix des Bouquets.

Prior to 1950, IGN maps reference numerous redoubts in Urrugne that have since been dismantled, including the former Voltigeurs Redoubt, the Choucoutoun Redoubt, and the Legarcia Redoubt. These fortifications have been subsumed by the urban expansion that has encroached upon the Larrun ridges within the town's boundaries.

== See also ==
- Battle of the Bidassoa
- Battle of the Nive
- Battle of Nivelle
- Campaign in north-east France (1814)
- France–Spain border
- Peninsular War
- French Revolutionary Wars

== Bibliography ==
- Antz, Jacques (2006). Autrefois Sare (in French). Biarritz: Atlantica. ISBN 2-84394-909-2. Archived from the original on March 3, 2016.
- Antz, Jacques (1993). Sare. Karrikez herriak (in French). Vol. 1. Saint-Jean-de-Luz: Ekaina. ISBN 2-9507270-1-8.
- Brialmont, Henri Alexis (1857). Histoire du duc de Wellington (in French). Vol. 2. Paris/Brussels: Charles Tanera / E. Guyot et Stapleaux fils. Archived from the original on June 15, 2023.
  - The author was a Belgian engineer officer specializing in fort construction, and founder of the Journal de l'armée belge (1850).
- Gaudeul, Francis (1980). Bulletin de la SSLA (in French). Bayonne: Société des sciences, lettres et arts de Bayonne.
- Gaudeul, Francis (1984). Bulletin de la SSLA (in French). Bayonne: Société des sciences, lettres et arts de Bayonne.
- Gaudeul, Francis (1985). Bulletin de la SSLA (in French). Bayonne: Société des sciences, lettres et arts de Bayonne.
- Lalanne, Guy (1991). "Ascain". Guéthary. Karrikez Herriak (in French). Saint-Jean-de-Luz: Ekaida. pp. 361–382.
  - The description of the battles referenced by Guy Lalanne is based on the nineteenth-century works of Commandant Clerc 1894 and P.J. Pellot.
- Lalanne, Guy (1989). Urrugne. Karrikez Herriak (in French). Bidart: Ekaida. pp. 139–150.
- Lorblanchès, Jean-Claude (2013). Campagne de l'armée impériale du Pays basque à Toulouse (1813-1814) (in French). Paris: L'Harmattan. ISBN 978-2-343-00112-8. Archived from the original on July 7, 2023.
- Clerc, Charles (1894). Campagne du maréchal Soult dans les Pyrénées-Occidentales en 1813-1814 (in French). Paris: L. Baudouin.
